= Pikku Huopalahti =

Coordinates: 60°11′N 024°54′E

Pikku Huopalahti Lillhoplax
- Helsinki Subdivision
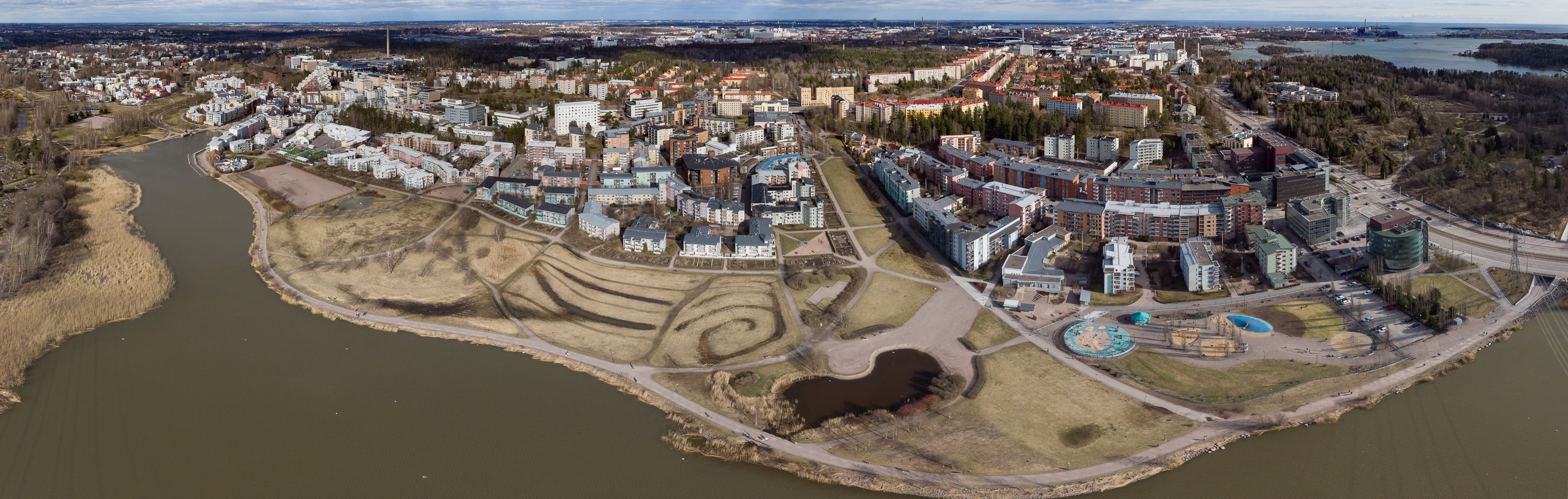

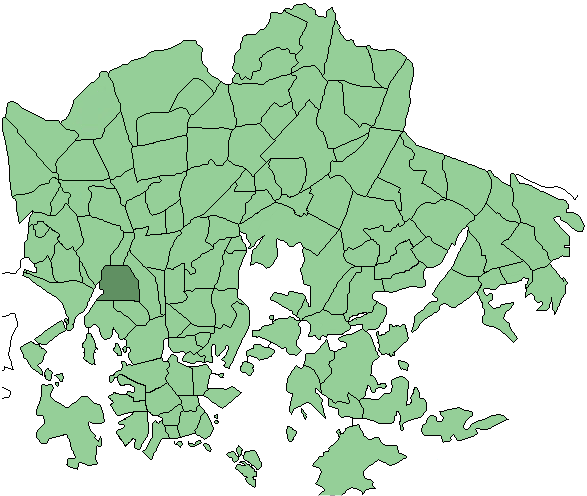
- Position of Pikku Huopalahti within Helsinki
- Country: Finland
- Region: Uusimaa
- Sub-region: Greater Helsinki
- Municipality: Helsinki
- District: Western
- Area: 2.12 km^{2} (0.82 sq mi)
- Population: 9,000
  - Density: 3,090/km^{2} (8,000/sq mi)
- Postal codes: 00300, 00270
- Subdivision number: 1505,1602,2916
- Neighbouring subdivisions: Pasila, Munkkiniemi, Ruskeasuo, Meilahti, Munkkivuori, Etelä-Haaga, Niemenmäki,

Pikku Huopalahti (Swedish: Lillhoplax) is a neighbourhood in the West of Helsinki between the Ruskeasuo neighbourhood and Mannerheimintie (one of the main streets in Helsinki) in the east, the Meilahti neighborhood in the South, the Niemenmäki neighborhood and Huopalahdentie street in the West and the Vihdintie street and Etelä-Haaga neighborhood in the North.

The neighborhood name means in Finnish 'Tiny Felt Bay' (after the original name in Swedish, Lillhoplax, was phonetically but inaccurately translated into Huopalahti in Finnish), with a bay of the same name forming most of the neighborhood edge on its West side, surrounded by a large park. This bay extends out to the Gulf of Finland. Most of the housing in Pikku Huopalahti is residential apartment building, primarily built in the 1990s. Pikku Huopalahti is home to around 10.000 people.

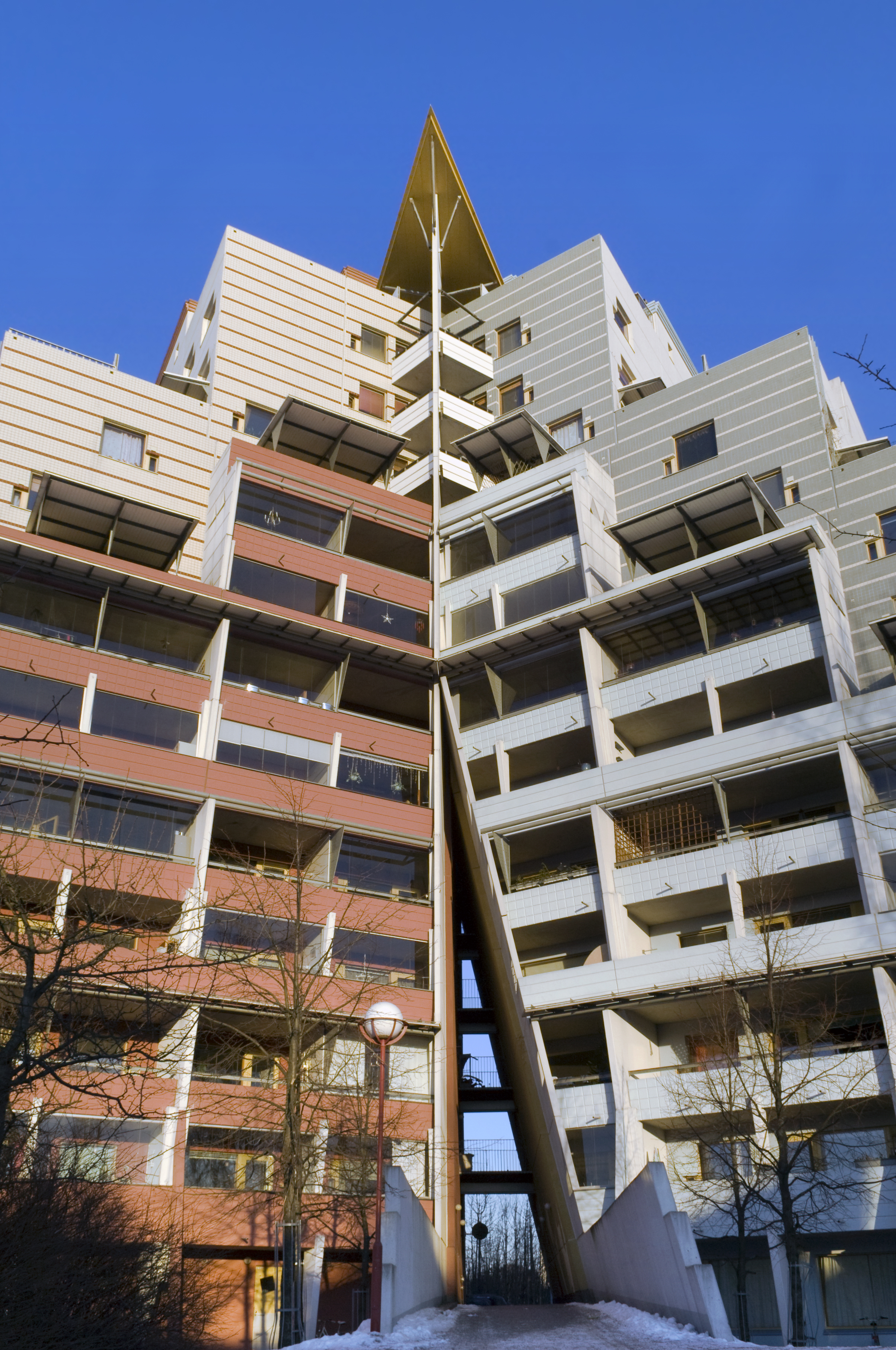
The terrace house is a landmark of the region and a good example of the architecture of Pikku Huopalahti

As a neighborhood of Helsinki, Pikku Huopalahti finds itself as a Sui generis. Helsinki's subdivision system uniquely divides Pikku Huopalahti as belonging to 3 separate city districts. The southern part belongs to the Meilahti district and is numbered 1505. The eastern part belongs to the Ruskeasuo district and is numbered 1602 and the rest of Pikku Huopalahti belongs to the Haaga district and is numbered 2916.

The headquarters of McDonald's Finland is located in Pikku Huopalahti on Paciuksenkatu, in a large cylindrical building designed by Heikkinen-Komonen architects.

The final stop on Helsinki's 10 tram is also located in Pikku Huopalahti. The 4 tram travels on Paciuksenkatu to the south of Pikku Huopalahti on its way to Munkkiniemi but never actually enters the neighborhood.

The University of Helsinki had its Department of Dentistry, Institute for Oral Health, Department of Public Health and Department of Forensic Medicine campus in the North East corner of Pikku Huopalahti. After the university decided to relocate its facilities, the existing buildings were torn down in 2023. The City of Helsinki has prepared an area plan draft to redevelop the area.

The neighborhood is also known as having a 'Legoland' effect because the buildings, mostly constructed in the past 20 years, all prominently display basic geometric patterns such as circles, squares, and triangles on the residential housing. Also, the use of light pastel colors, mostly white, light blue, and turquoise, make Pikku Huopalahti a very distinct neighborhood compared to the other neighborhoods to the north and west that have more traditional housing stock from the 1940s and 1950s. The architecture and urban layout is said to reflect criticisms of modernism present in the "Oulu school" of architecture often associated with Reima and Raili Pietilä.

City districts partly forming and/or surrounding Pikku-Huopalahti are Meilahti, Munkkiniemi, Munkkivuori, Niemenmäki, Etelä-Haaga and Ruskeasuo.

== Gallery ==
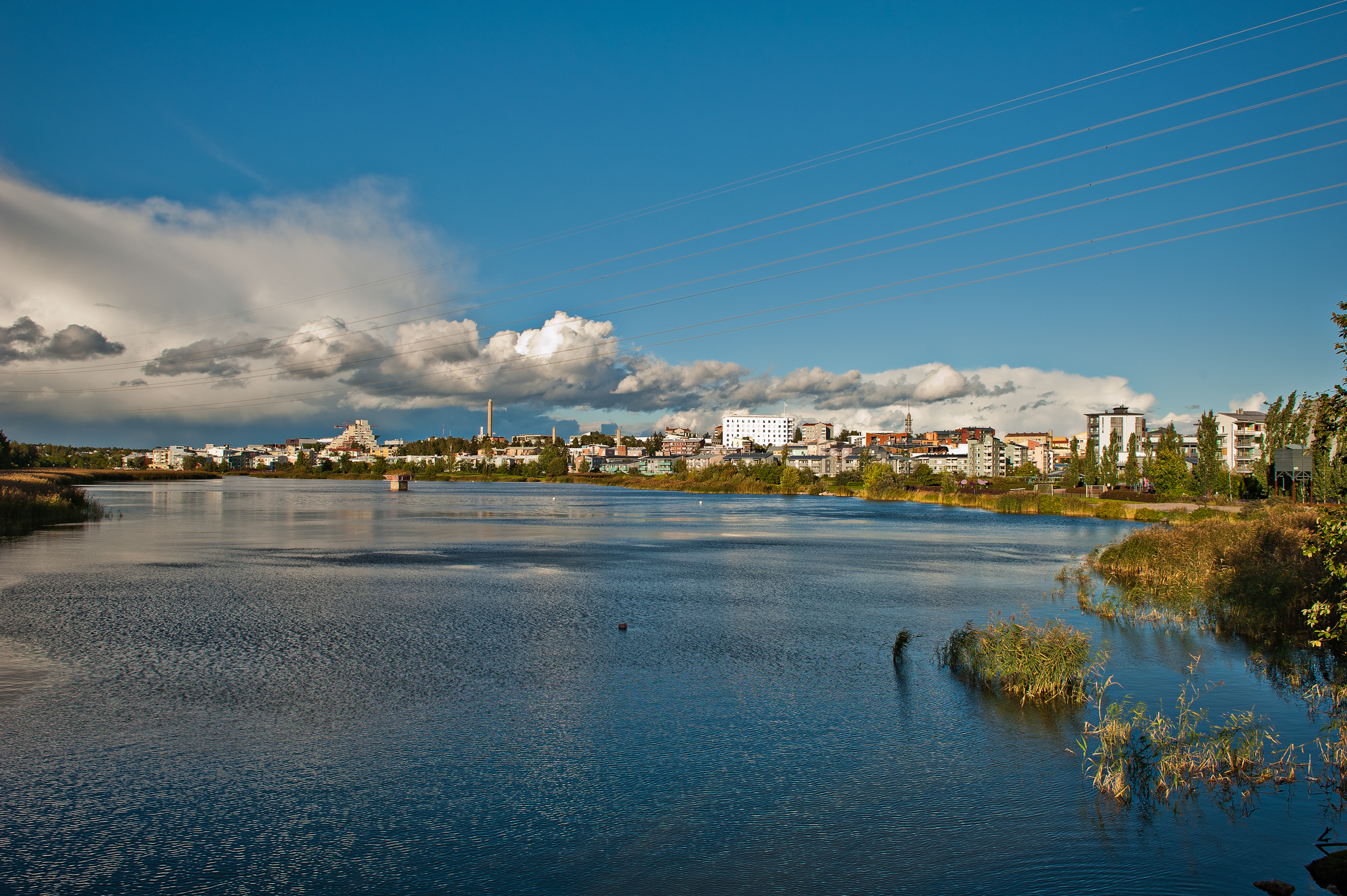
Pikku Huopalahti neighbourhood, view from Paciuksenkadun silta (bridge on Paciuksenkatu).

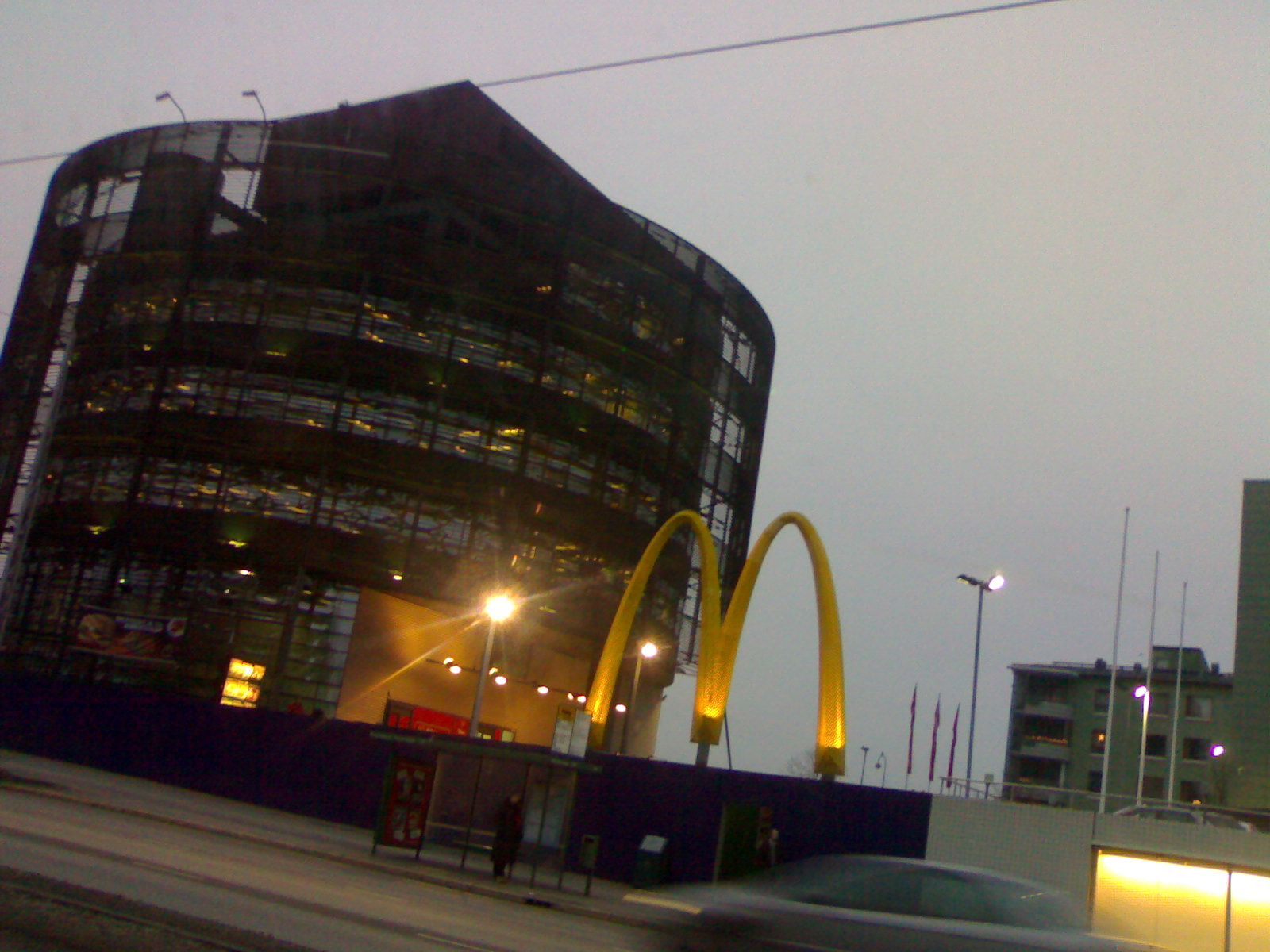

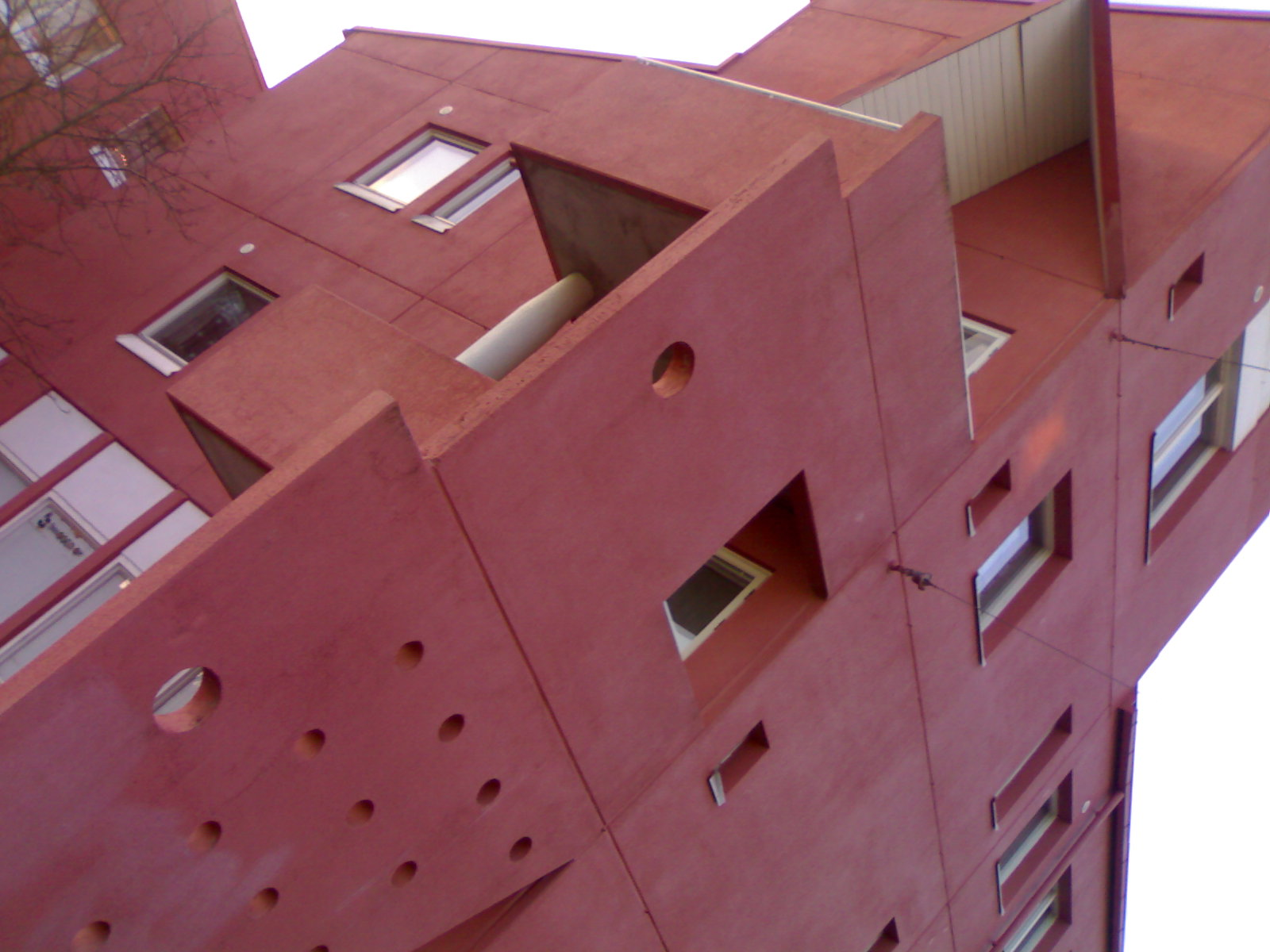

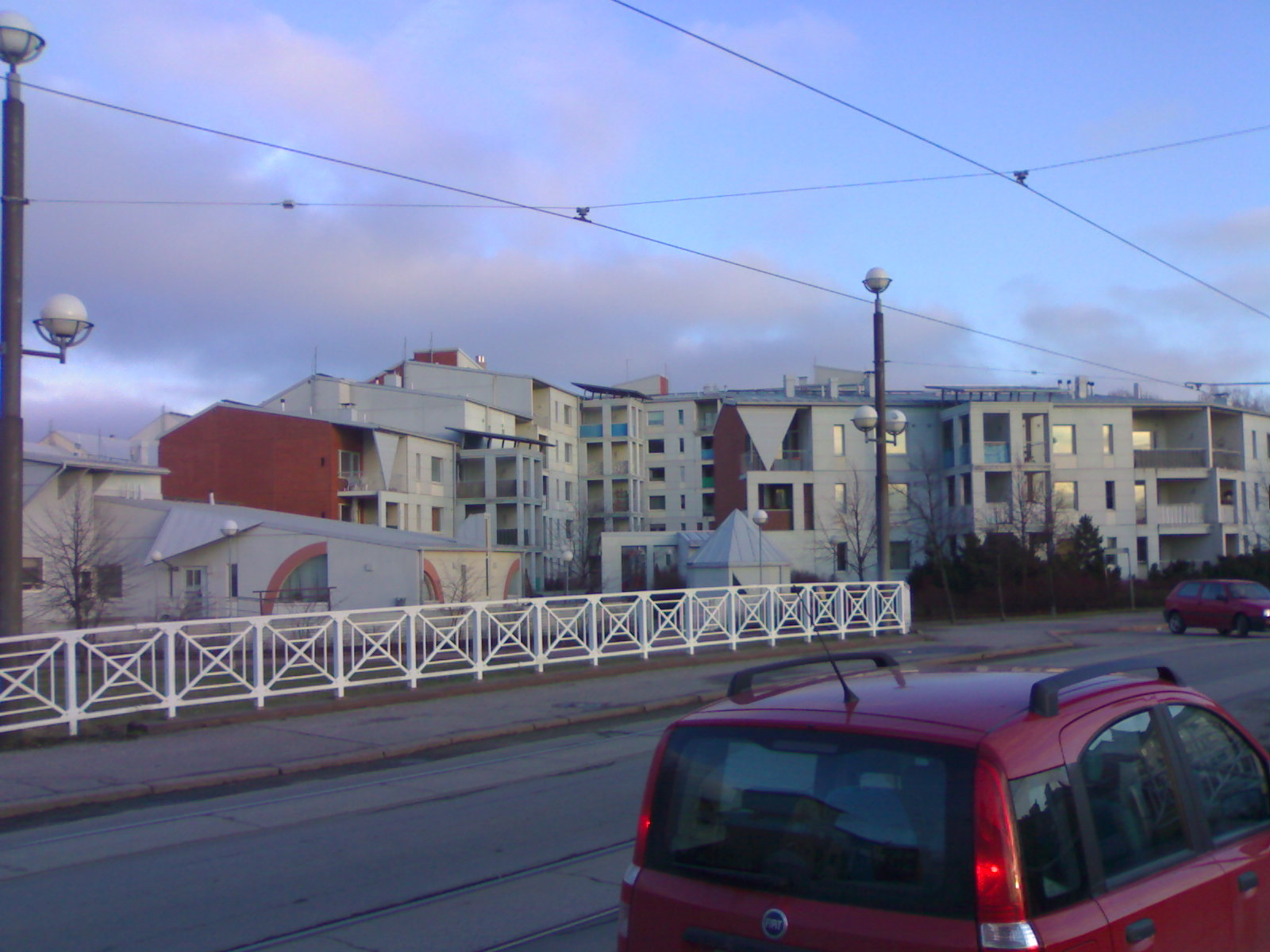

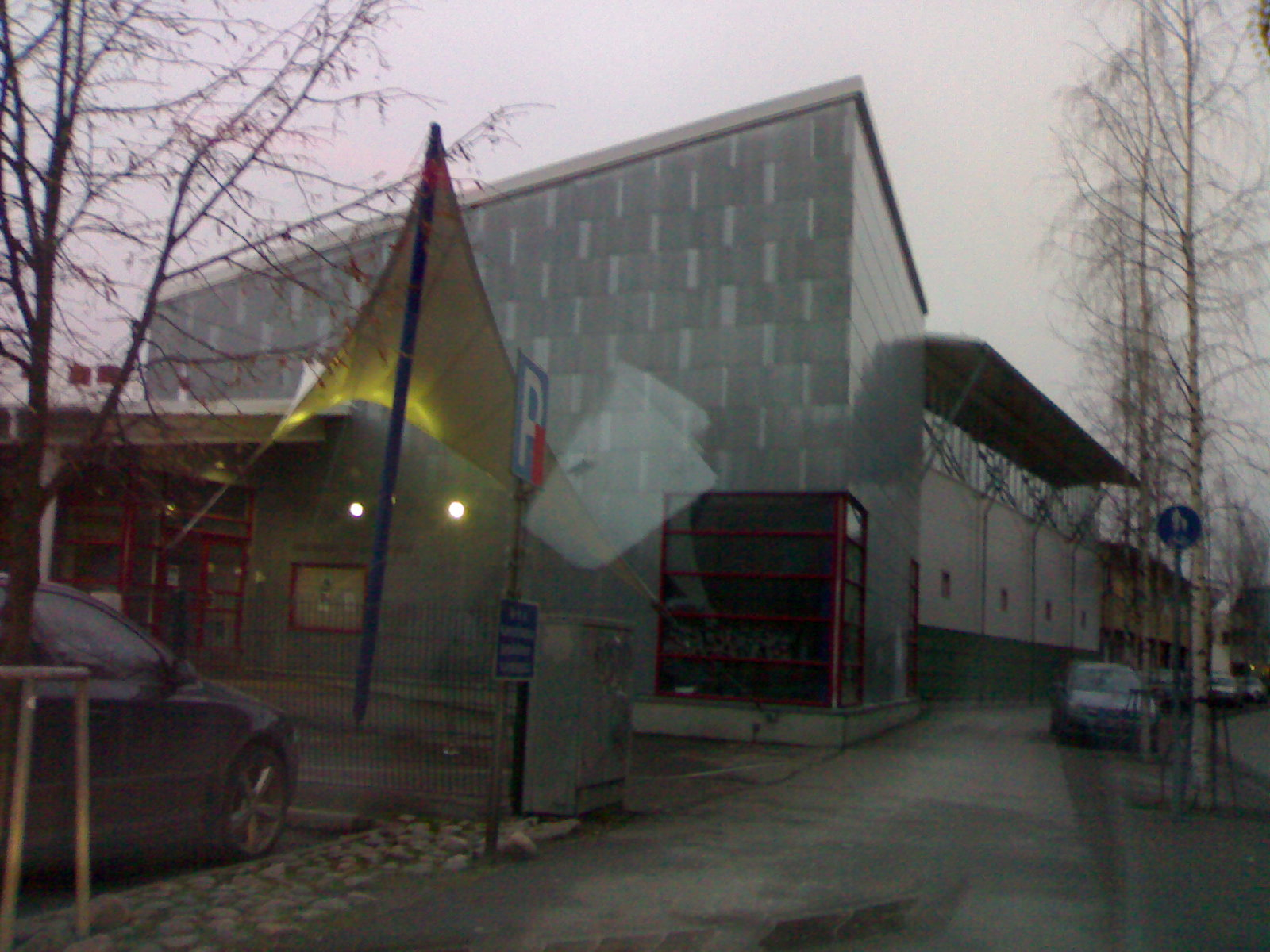

== See also ==
- Pikku Huopalahti dumping ground
