= Vanha Munkkiniemi =

Vanha Munkkiniemi Gamla Munksnäs
- Helsinki Subdivision
- Position of Vanha Munkkiniemi within Helsinki
- Coordinates: 60.194537°N 24.880063°E
- Country: Finland
- Region: Uusimaa
- Sub-region: Greater Helsinki
- Municipality: Helsinki
- District: Western
- Subdivision regions: is a quarter of the Munkkiniemi neighbourhood
- Area: 1.83 km^{2} (0.71 sq mi)
- Population: 8,322
  - Density: 4,550/km^{2} (11,800/sq mi)
- Postal codes: 00330
- Subdivision number: 301
- Neighbouring subdivisions: Kuusisaari; Meilahti; Pikku Huopalahti; Niemenmäki; Munkkivuori; Talinranta; Tali; Espoo

Vanha Munkkiniemi (Finnish), Gamla Munksnäs (Swedish), both of them meaning ′Old Munkkiniemi′, is a neighborhood that contains the original part of Munkkiniemi district in Helsinki, Finland.
