= Talinranta =

Talinranta Talistranden
- Helsinki Subdivision
- Position of Talinranta within Helsinki
- Coordinates: 60.207572°N 24.856139°E
- Country: Finland
- Region: Uusimaa
- Sub-region: Greater Helsinki
- Municipality: Helsinki
- District: Western
- Subdivision regions: is a quarter of the Munkkiniemi neighbourhood
- Area: 0.40 km^{2} (0.15 sq mi)
- Population: 1,226
  - Density: 3,065/km^{2} (7,940/sq mi)
- Postal codes: 00350
- Subdivision number: 306
- Neighbouring subdivisions: Tali; Munkkivuori; Vanha Munkkiniemi; Espoo

Talinranta (Swedish: Talistranden) is a neighbourhood in Munkkiniemi district of Helsinki, Finland. It is located west from Munkkivuori and south from Tali. In south, Finnish national road 1 separates Talinranta from Vanha Munkkiniemi.

As of 2005 Talinranta has 1,226 inhabitants living in an area of 0.40 km^{2}
