= Niemenmäki =

Coordinates: 60°12′15.15″N 24°53′4.61″E

Niemenmäki Näshöjden
- Helsinki Subdivision
- Position of Niemenmäki within Helsinki
- Country: Finland
- Region: Uusimaa
- Sub-region: Greater Helsinki
- Municipality: Helsinki
- District: Western
- Subdivision regions: is a quarter of the Munkkiniemi neighbourhood
- Area: 018 km^{2} (6.9 sq mi)
- Population (January 1, 2005): 1 254
  - Density: 6/km^{2} (16/sq mi)
- Postal codes: 00350
- Subdivision number: 305
- Neighbouring subdivisions: Vanha Munkkiniemi; Munkkivuori; Etelä-Haaga; Pikku Huopalahti

Niemenmäki (Swedish: Näshöjden) is a quarter of the Munkkiniemi neighbourhood in Helsinki. Niemenmäki was constructed in the early 1960s. The nearby Shopping center provides everyday services to Niemenmäki inhabitants. Huopalahdentie road separates Niemenmäki from Munkkivuori in the West and Lapinmäentie road from Haaga in the North. Allotment gardens separate Niemenmäki both from Pikku Huopalahti in the East and from Vanha Munkkiniemi in the South.

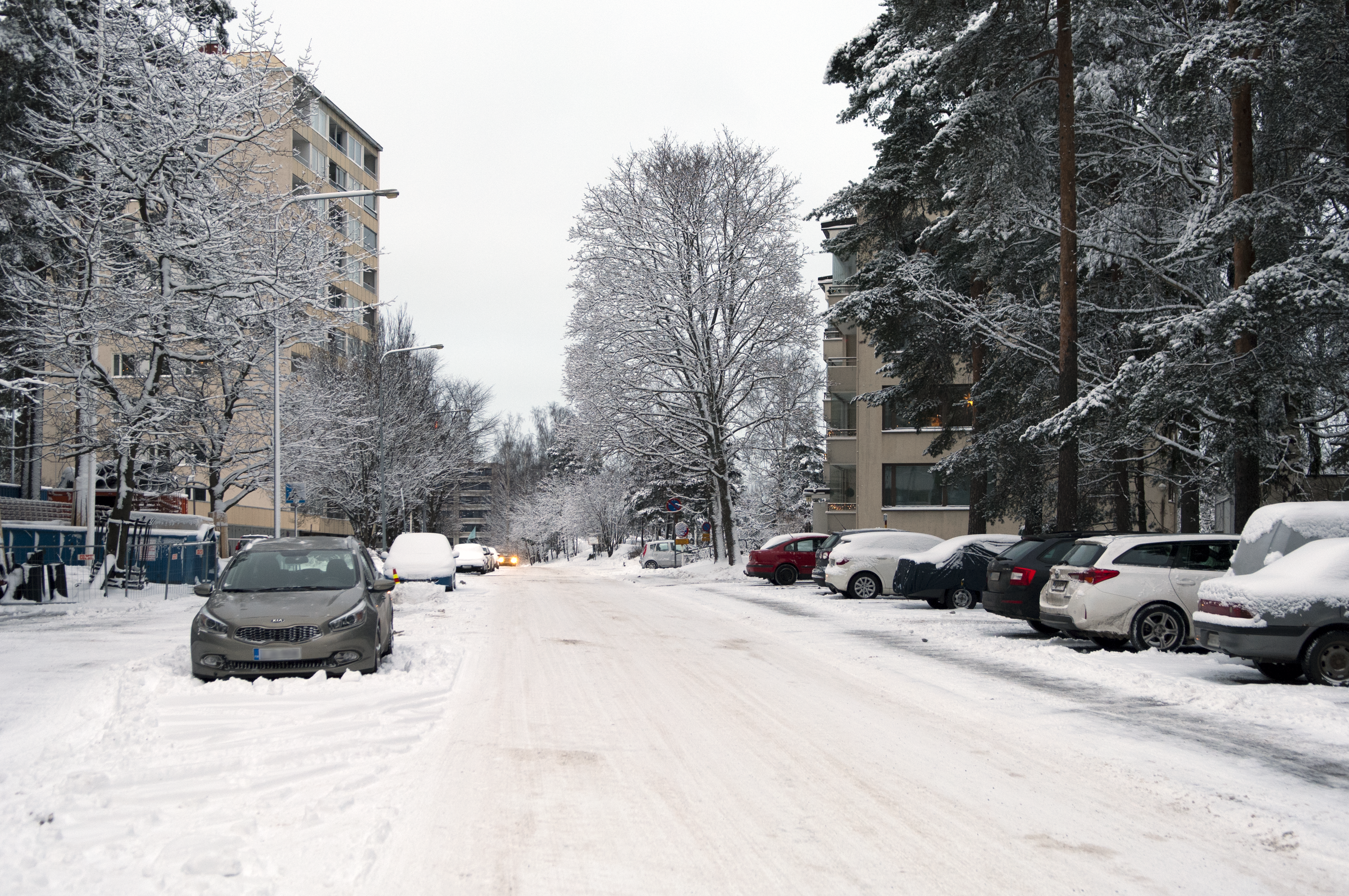
Apartment buildings in Niemenmäki

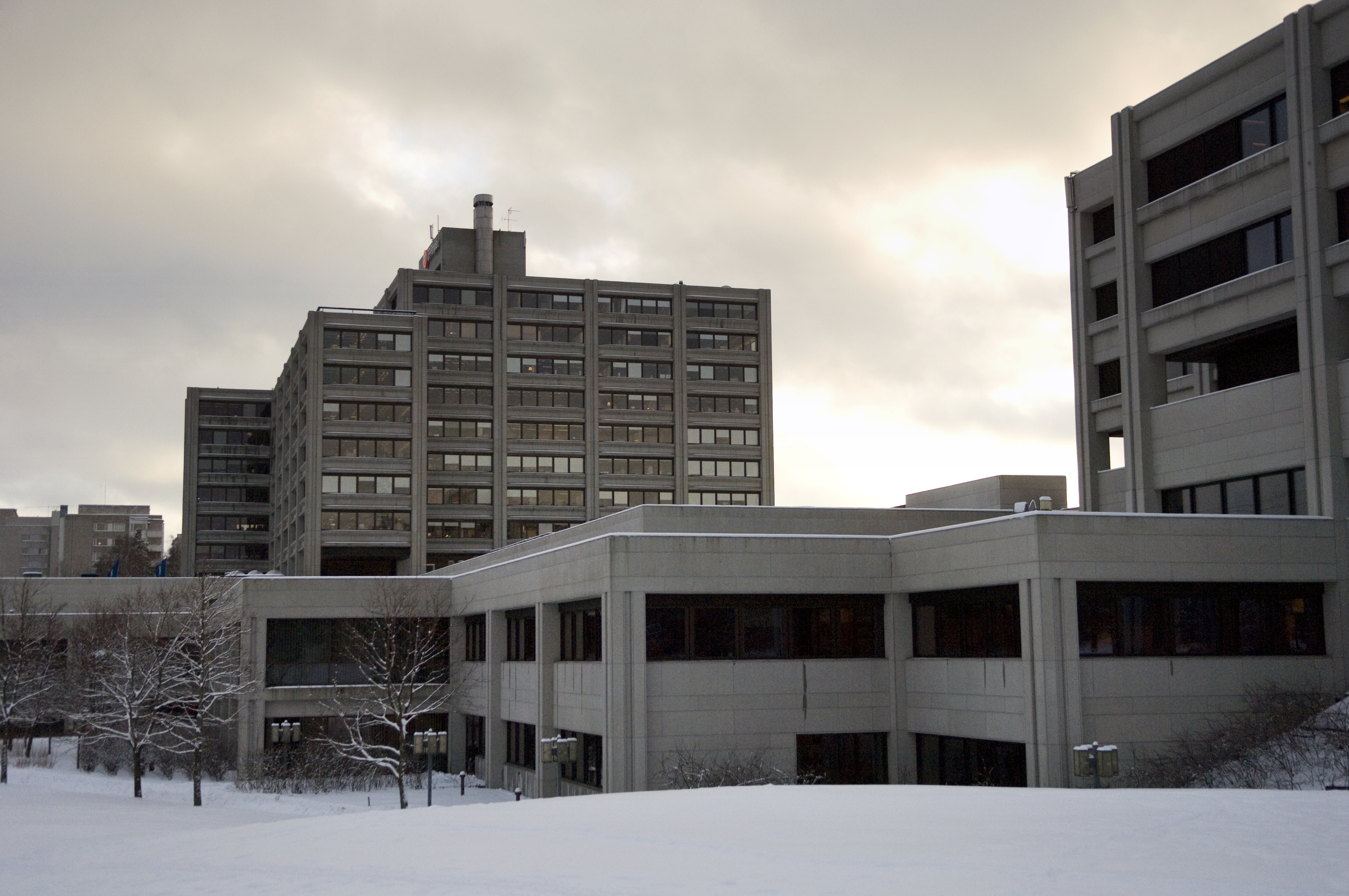
The headquarters of OP-Pohjola Group are in Niemenmäki
