= Kuusisaari =

Kuusisaari Granö
- Helsinki Subdivision
- Position of Kuusisaari within Helsinki
- Coordinates: 60°11′10″N 24°51′50″E
- Country: Finland
- Region: Uusimaa
- Sub-region: Greater Helsinki
- Municipality: Helsinki
- District: Western
- Subdivision regions: is a quarter of the Munkkiniemi neighbourhood
- Area: 0.40 km^{2} (0.15 sq mi)
- Population: 455
  - Density: 1,140/km^{2} (3,000/sq mi)
- Postal codes: 00340
- Subdivision number: 302
- Neighbouring subdivisions: Lehtisaari, Vanha Munkkiniemi, Meilahti, Espoo

Kuusisaari (Finnish), Granö (Swedish) is an island and a neighborhood of Helsinki, Finland. It has the highest average income of all the Helsinki metropolitan area. Many foreign embassies are located in Kuusisaari.
