= Munkkiniemi Pension =

Building in Munkkiniemi, Helsinki

Munkkiniemi pension
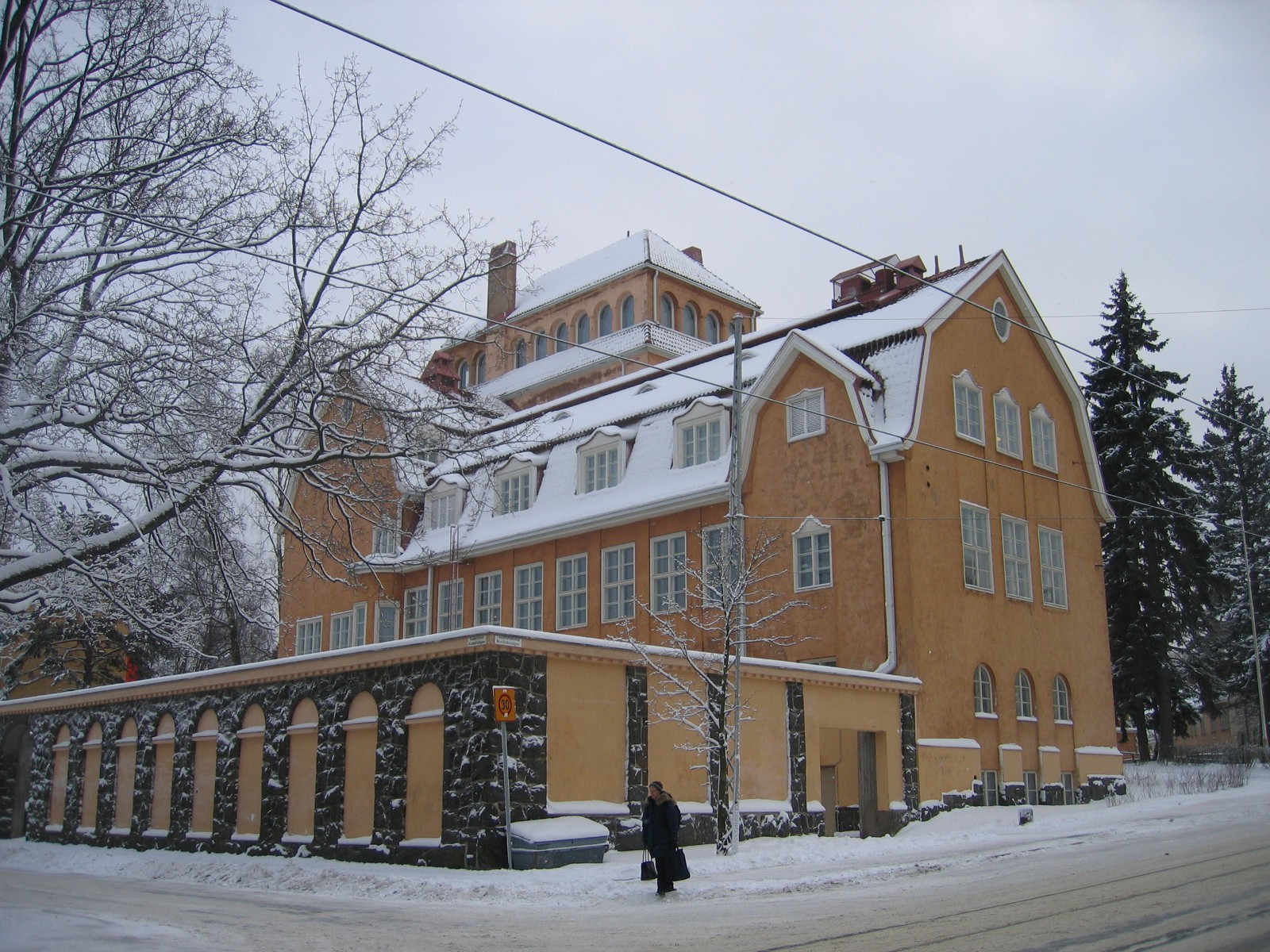
- Munkkiniemi pension in Munkkiniemi, Helsinki
- Interactive map of the Munkkiniemi pension area

General information
- Location: Hollantilaisentie 11, Munkkiniemi, Helsinki
- Coordinates: 60°11′44″N 24°52′26″E
- Current tenants: AALTO Ympäristökehitys Oy
- Completed: 1918
- Owner: State of Finland

Design and construction
- Architect: Eliel Saarinen

The Munkkiniemi Pension or the Munkkiniemi Boarding House (most recently the Munkkiniemi House of Education) is a building in Munkkiniemi, Helsinki, designed by Eliel Saarinen, which was completed in 1918 and located at Hollantilaisentie 11. Saarinen designed the building as well as its interiors. Along with the terraced houses on the other side of the street, the building represents the only concrete commission that resulted from Saarinen's Munkkiniemi-Haaga Plan of 1915.

The building functioned as a boarding house only until 1923. In the following year, the National Defence University began its operation in the building, where it remained until 1940, when it was transferred to Santahamina. The building was then occupied by the headquarters of the Finnish Air Force until 1973. After that, the building was renovated, and in 1976 it was transferred to the State Education Centre. In 2002, the centre was incorporated and came to be known as HAUS Finnish Institute of Public Management Ltd. The main tenant was from 2004 the National Board of Customs, which initiated its educational functions there, later known as the Customs School. After the Customs School had moved to Pasila, HAUS moved to city center in January 2018 leaving the building mainly empty.

The Helsinki City Government has passed a zoning plan in May 2019, according to which the building will be turned into apartments, with a total of 45 of them. The premises of the training center's restaurant will remain there. The outward appearance and the interiors of the building will change to some extent. The tower salon will be turned into an apartment, and some balconies will be built. The building is a protected one.

== Sources ==
- Pensionaatista Munkkinimen koulutustaloksi ['From a pension into the Munkkiniemi House of Education']. Helsinki: The Finnish National Board of Customs. 2009.
