= Getaway in Stockholm =

Swedish film series

- Original work: Getaway in Stockholm
- Owner: Getaway in Stockholm Production

Films and television
- Film(s): Getaway in Stockholm 2 (2001) Getaway in Stockholm 3 (2002) Getaway in Stockholm 4 (2003) Getaway in Stockholm 5 (2004) Getaway in Stockholm 6 (2005) Getaway in Stockholm 7 (2006) Getaway in Stockholm 8 (2007) Getaway in Stockholm 9 (2008) Getaway in Stockholm 10 (2009)

Getaway in Stockholm 6

Getaway in Stockholm is a Swedish film series about illegal street racing filmed using mainly car mounted cameras along with some cameramen alongside the route. The videos are all shot in the streets of Stockholm, Sweden and have developed a worldwide underground cult reputation in the street racing scene.

== Background ==
One film is released every year. The actual run takes place during early morning hours in late autumn when there's the least amount of traffic. Under Swedish law, people can only be convicted of traffic violations if they are caught committing them or if they admit to them. Therefore, the identities of the director, cameraman, drivers and the car owners are carefully withheld, though Mr X is likely Jocke "Qvarnis" Qvarnström. So far, ten volumes of the series have been released:

- Getaway in Stockholm:1: Porsche 911 carrera 1978
- Getaway in Stockholm 2: Toyota Supra (A80) and Ford Escort RS Cosworth
- Getaway in Stockholm 3: Honda NSX
- Getaway in Stockholm 4: Honda NSX and Chevrolet Corvette (C5)
- Getaway in Stockholm 5: Mazda RX-7 (FD3S)
- Getaway in Stockholm 6: Dodge Viper GTS and Porsche 911 GT3 (996)
- Getaway in Stockholm 7: BMW M3 CSL (E46) and BMW M5 (E39)
- Getaway in Stockholm 8: Audi RS6 (C5) and Honda CBR1000RR motorcycle
- Getaway in Stockholm 9: Porsche 911 GT3 (996) vs Porsche 911 GT3 RS (996)
- Getaway in Stockholm 10: Porsche 911 GT3 (996) and Lamborghini Gallardo

The series was the main reason Stockholm was included in the video game Project Gotham Racing 2 and is mainly influenced by the legendary short film C'était un rendez-vous.

== Public response ==
The movie series gained negative public attention in Finland in the aftermath of a traffic accident that took place on 13 August 2002. A local importer of the Getaway in Stockholm movies killed a nine-year-old girl by running over her with his car in Munkkivuori, Helsinki. The driver of the tuned Audi S3 (8L) car was reportedly speeding.

== See also ==
- C'était un rendez-vous
