= Etelä-Haaga =

Coordinates: 60°13′N 24°53′E

Etelä-Haaga Södra Haga
- Helsinki Subdivision
- Position of Etelä-Haaga within Helsinki
- Country: Finland
- Region: Uusimaa
- Sub-region: Greater Helsinki
- Municipality: Helsinki
- District: Western
- Area: 2.30 km^{2} (0.89 sq mi)
- Population: 12,000
  - Density: 5,200/km^{2} (13,000/sq mi)
- Postal codes: 00320
- Subdivision number: 291
- Neighbouring subdivisions: Pohjois-Haaga, Kivihaka, Ruskeasuo, Niemenmäki, Munkkivuori, Pitäjänmäen teollisuusalue, Lassila

Etelä-Haaga (Finnish), Södra Haga (Swedish) is a neighborhood of Helsinki, Finland.
