= Munkkivuori =

Munkkivuori Munkshöjden
- Helsinki Subdivision
- Position of Munkkivuori within Helsinki
- Country: Finland
- Region: Uusimaa
- Sub-region: Greater Helsinki
- Municipality: Helsinki
- District: Western
- Subdivision regions: is a quarter of the Munkkiniemi neighbourhood
- Area: 114 km^{2} (44 sq mi)
- Population: 4,890 (31 December 2,025)
  - Density: 4,289/km^{2} (11,110/sq mi)
- Postal codes: 00350
- Subdivision number: 304
- Neighbouring subdivisions: Vanha Munkkiniemi; Talinranta; Tali; Pitäjänmäen teollisuusalue Etelä-Haaga; Niemenmäki

Munkkivuori (Swedish: Munkshöjden, literally 'Monk Mountain') is a quarter of the Munkkiniemi neighbourhood in Helsinki. The buildings and the plan of site are typical of the late 1950s. Most of the residential buildings in Munkkivuori are within a loop formed by Ulvilantie ring road. The automotive traffic to the residential buildings is routed along Ulvilantie whereas Raumantie no through road terminating in the center of the Ulvilantie loop provides access to public services and limits the through-traffic in residential areas. A designed network of crushed stone walkways provides easy accessibility around Munkkivuori for cyclists, pedestrians and other non-automotive traffic.

Munkkivuoren ostoskeskus (Munkkivuori shopping centre), the first shopping centre in Finland, was built in 1959. The small shopping center, known as "Ostari" amongst the locals, is the focal point of Munkkivuori and is the home to some 40 companies. Many everyday services are available at the viable shopping center. These services include two grocery stores, a cafeteria, a nearby church, a couple of barber shops and fast food restaurants, a pharmacy, a privately owned health center, ATM, a bookstore and an Alko liquor store. There are three educational institutions in Munkkivuori; the Franco-Finnish school, the Munkkivuoren Ala-Aste comprehensive school and a pre-school with a kindergarten. A youth center is located in the same building with the pre-school. Helsinki City Transport buses number 20, 30, 33, 34, 35, 52, 57 and 500 provide public traffic connections to Munkkivuori.

The Industrial zone of Pitäjänmäki limits Munkkivuori geographically in the North whereas the national road number 1 to Turku separates Munkkivuori from Vanha Munkkiniemi in the South. In the East, Huopalahdentie road draws a border between the neighbouring quarters of Niemenmäki and Etelä-Haaga. A footpath from Munkkiniemen puisto park to the mansion of Tali, excluding the mansion itself, lines the border of Munkkivuori in the West.

Tali outdoor walking area with its sports facilities such as tennis, squash, soccer and bowling centers forms roughly half of Munkkivuori. All of the sports centers have indoors facilities providing all-year access to these sports. Additionally, outdoor soccer, tennis and rugby fields exist for summertime use. The soccer fields occupy a large area of Munkkivuori and are among the biggest in Helsinki. Both sand and grass soccer fields are available. Apart from the sports facility buildings there are no buildings in the outdoor area. The Tali 18-hole golf course is partially in Munkkivuori although the majority of the golf course resides in Tali quarter. The Tali allotment gardens, the main horse racing track of Finland, Vermo, and a couple of disc golf courses are in the vicinity of Munkkivuori.

== History ==
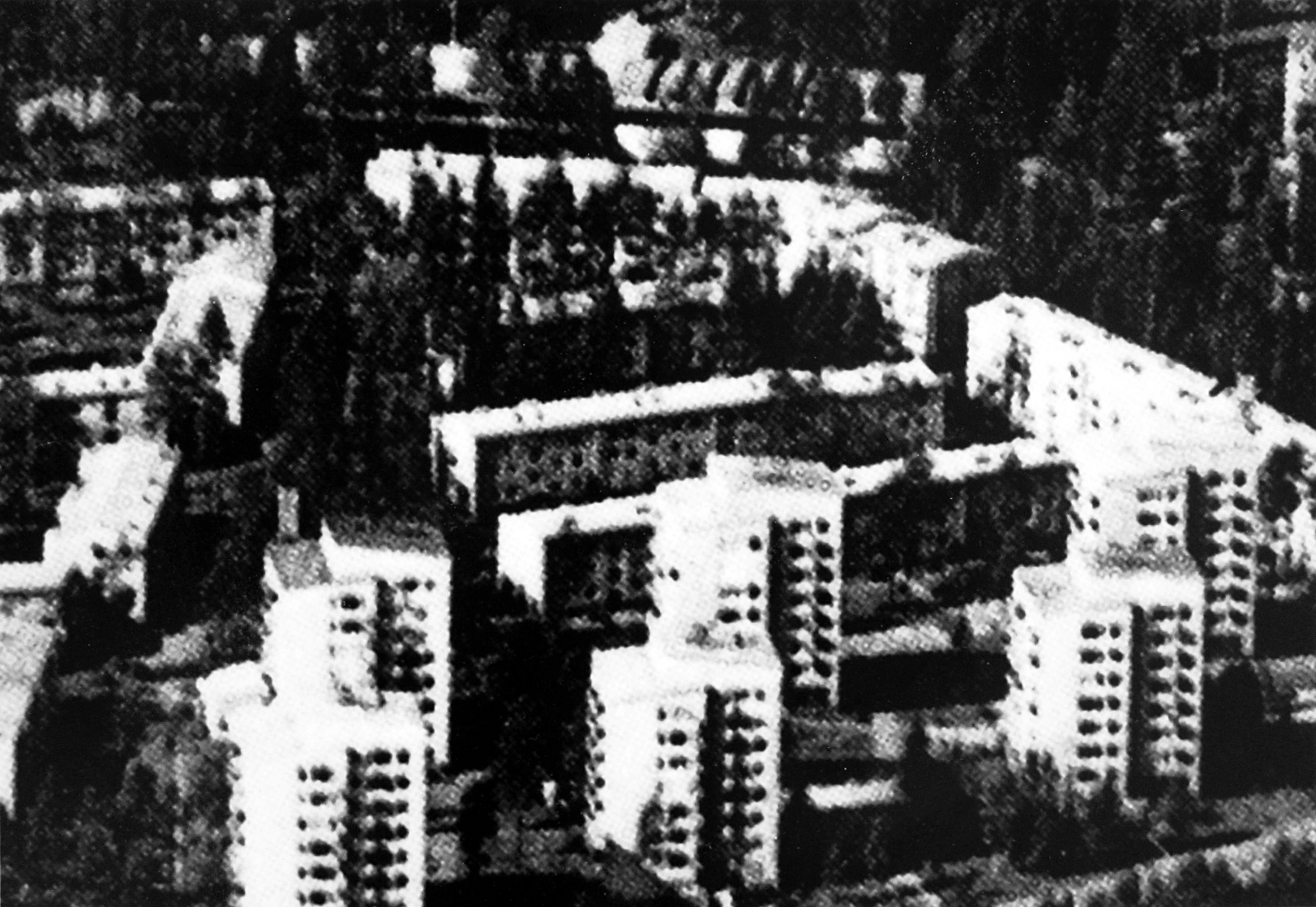
War veterans built Ulvilantie 29

Munkkivuori population by age cohort

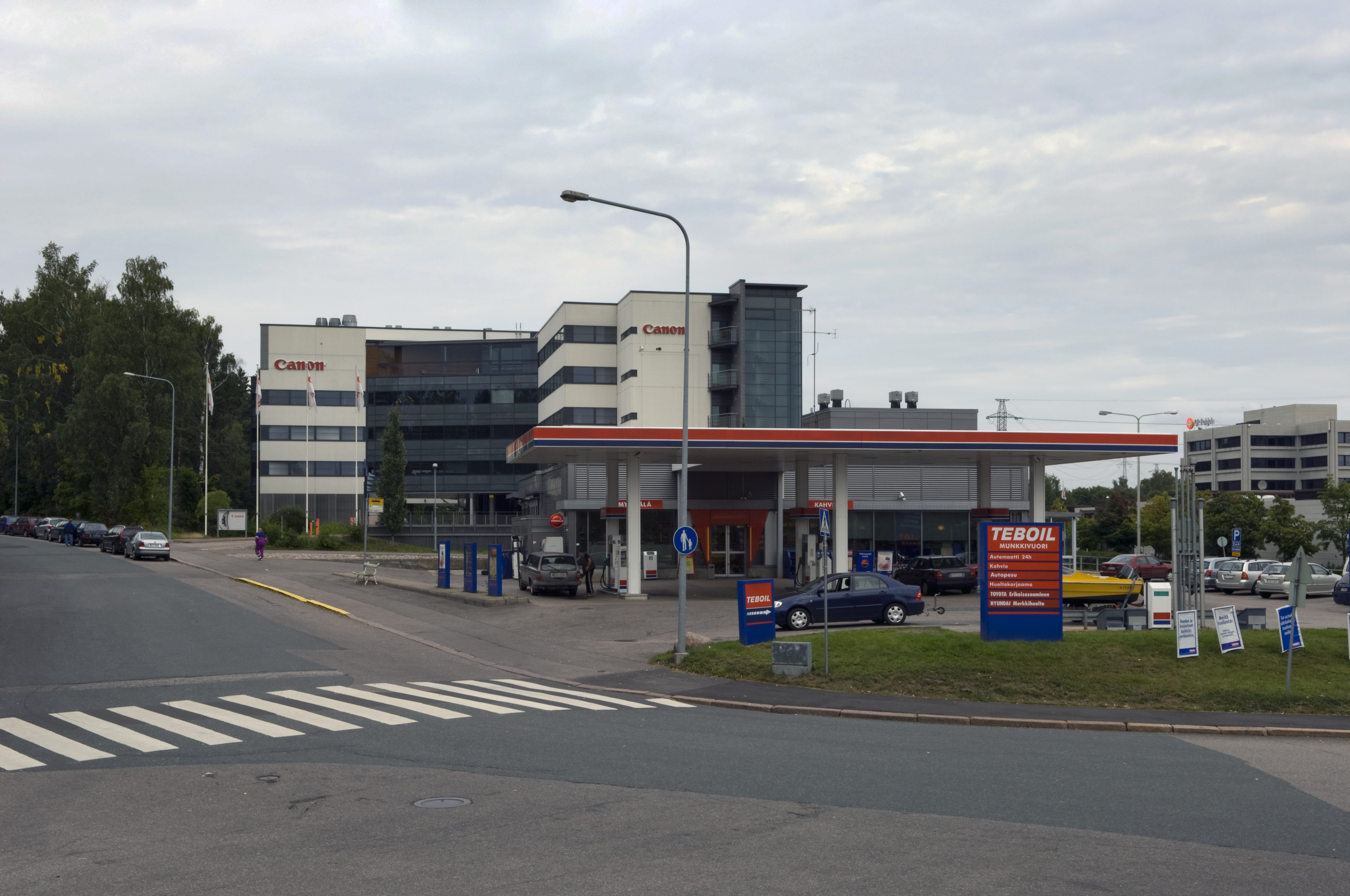
Teboil petrol station and Canon regional headquarters

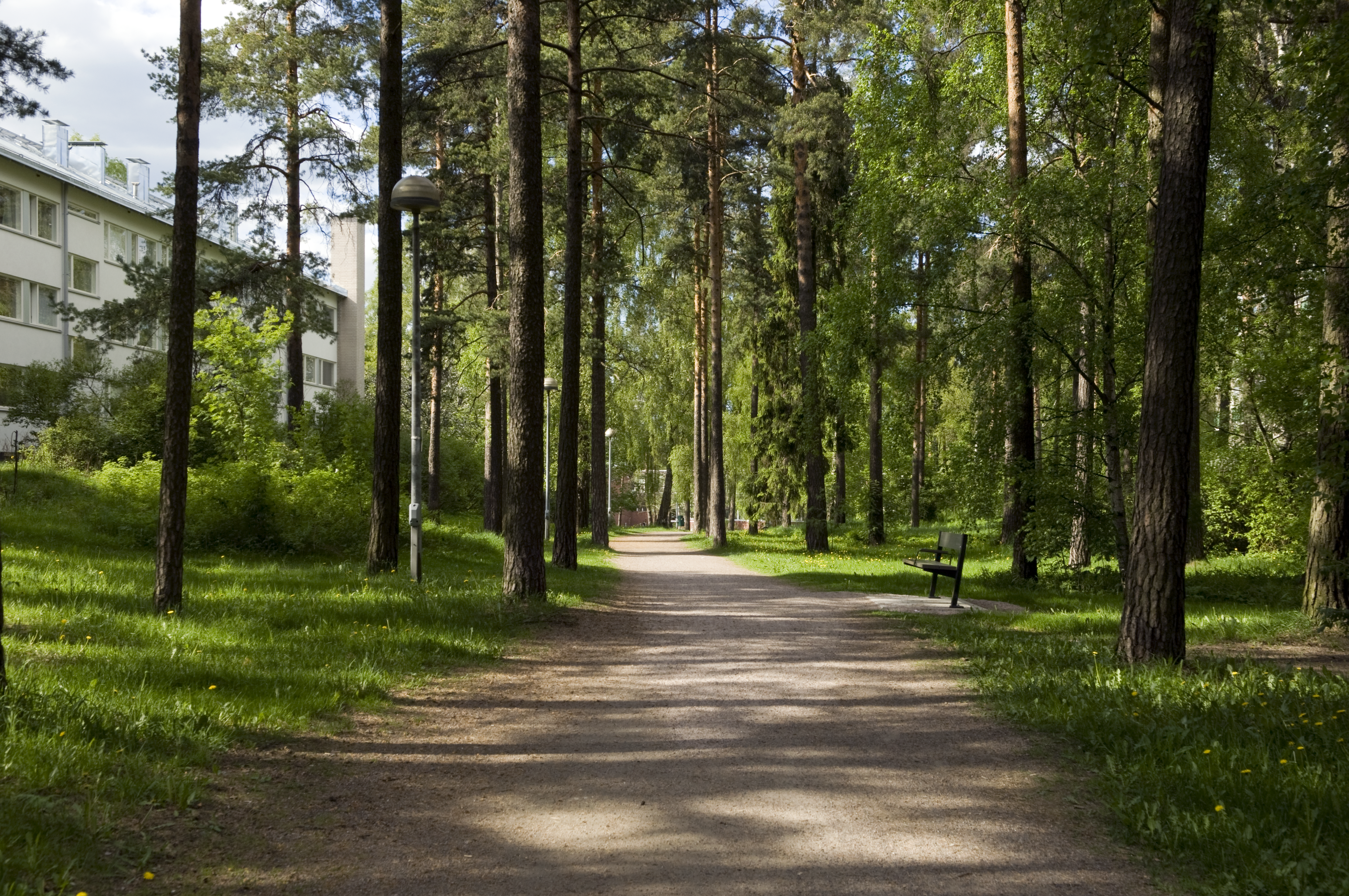
Typical footpath under verdant green trees in Munkkivuori

Finland was suffering from a severe housing shortage in the postwar era. As a measure to solve the housing shortage various professional bodies and civic groups founded housing cooperatives to build new houses. Munkkivuori had housing cooperatives for war veterans, nurses, teachers, foresters and civil servants among others which launched the construction of Munkkivuori residential area in the late 1950s. Architect Olavi Terho was given the responsibility for the land-use planning of the area, then known as Pohjois-Munkkiniemi (North Munkkiniemi). The name Munkkivuori was adopted when the plan of the site was confirmed. The elevated bedrock of the area was the basis for the name that is adapted from Munkkiniemi of which Munkkivuori (vuori is Finnish for 'mountain') is part of. The etymology of the name is analyzed in more detail in Munkkiniemi article.

Munkkivuori was built according to the "forest town" philosophy, first popularized in Finland with the Tapiola garden city, and where the buildings are scattered sparsely on the site, leaving a lot of space and forest among the houses. Other neighbourhoods built according to the same philosophy include Herttoniemi and Maunula in Helsinki and Iso-Heikkilä in Turku. The homogeneous communities that built the housing have since dwindled away but many long-term residents still live in Munkkivuori. It is not uncommon for the offspring of the first generation Munkkivuorineans to return to live in Munkkivuori after living elsewhere in between.

Very limited complementary construction has taken place in Munkkivuori since the neighbourhood was completed in the early 1960s and thus the area is still very spacious. The only complementary residential building along the Ulvilantie ring road is the apartment building Munkkivuoren Mäntyrinne, with 25 apartments, completed in August 2013.

Another building erected in Munkkivuori in the 2000s is the office building at Ulvilantie 24, and currently housing the Canon Finland headquarters. The building was built in 2003 and it is located next to the Teboil petrol station building. The petrol station itself was completed in 1961 for Oy Trustivapaa bensiini.

=== Shopping centre ===
Shopping center companies in its opening year

- Helsingin Osakepankki (HOP)
- Helsingin Osuuskauppa
- Helsingin Talouskauppa Oy
- K-valintamyymälä — Täydellinen elintarvikeliike
- Kansallis-Osake-Pankki (KOP)
- Oy Karl Fazerin Konditoria Ab
- Kelloseppä Tauno Virtanen
- Kemikaaliliike Irmeli Sahras
- Kemikaaliliike Isa Virkkunen
- Oy Lindström Ab
- Munkkiniemen Kirjakauppa Oy
- Munkkivuoren Apteekki
- Osakeyhtiö Neovius
- Osuusliike Elanto
- Oy Pohjoismaiden Yhdyspankki (PYP)
- Pohjolan Pesula Oy
- Rautatiekirjakauppa Oy
- Sanoma Oy
- Suomen Turistiauto Oy
- Torkkelin Säästöpankki

— Munkkivuoren Sanomat 4/59.

The Munkkivuori shopping centre was designed by architects Olavi Terho, Nils Sandell and Antti Pernaja. The shopping center was the first of its kind in Finland, and introduced a new way of shopping, in which families would concentrate their shopping in one place. The developer for the project was Otto Wuorio Oy. The CEO of Otto Wuorio, Lauri Reunala, travelled to the United States to learn about shopping centres. At first, there were conflicting naming proposals for the shopping centre. The initial name suggested was Munkkivaaran ostoskeskus and this name was even adopted by the local pharmacy for a while. Professor Kustaa Vilkuna, a linguist, suggested a common name Puhos for all shopping communities. In practice, the current name Munkkivuoren ostoskeskus became established, simply after the name of the quarter.

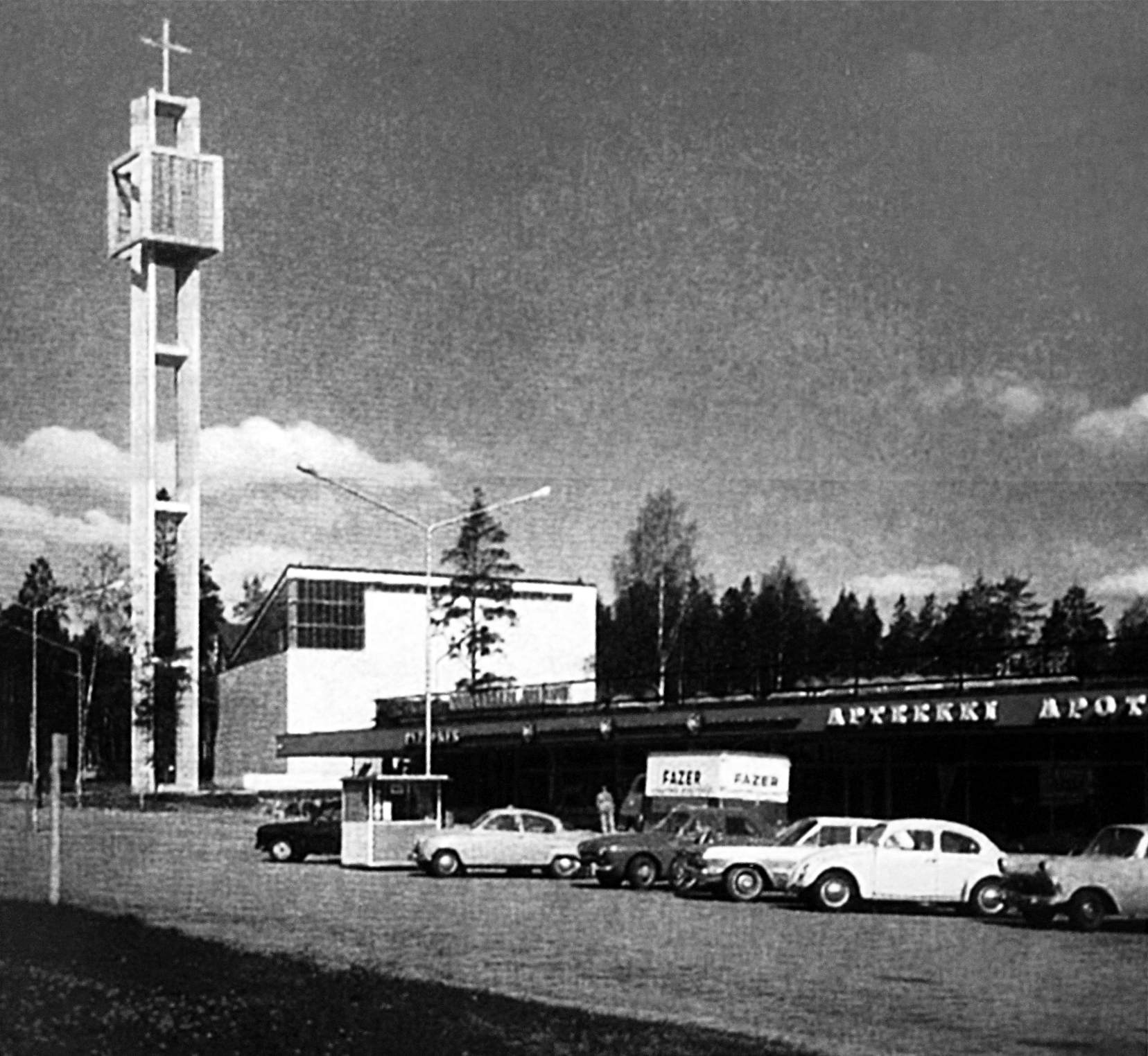
Munkkivuori shopping centre, church and bell tower in the early 1960s

A real estate company named Munkkivuoren Ostoskeskus Oy was established on 30 January 1959 for managing the shopping centre properties. The shopping centre opened on 3 December 1959, with attractions such as Fazer cafeteria, Varuboden, HOK bar, Clou make-up store, and various banks such as HOP, SYP, Torkkeli and KOP-bus. PIVO traded daily consumer goods and introduced their own-produced convenience food. In the 1960s, the shopping centre was marketed with good traffic connections and parking space, and was first expanded and modernized in 1964. Planning work for building a metropolitan railway system in Helsinki was intense at that time, and a first draft was issued in March 1963; in accordance with this draft, the expansion of the shopping centre included the construction of the first metro station of Finland.

The plan to build a metro to Munkkivuori and a metro depot to Tali, however, was rejected after lengthy discussions as too extensive. Helsinki metro construction works finally commenced in 1971 but by that time the whole metro line running northbound from city center was abandoned and an eastbound line was to be built. Thus, ironically enough, the first metro station of Finland never saw a metro. The 1964 modernization of the shopping center, including Munkkivuori metro station construction works, was already completed when the northbound metro plans were scrapped. As of today the station has been converted into a small business plaza where a handful of stand-alone stores operate. A short leg of the metro tunnel also remains under the shopping center as reminiscence.

The next modernization and renovation of the shopping center took place in 1994. An underground parking hall and an extension wing for S-Market supermarket were built. The shopping center courtyard was bulldozed to give room for the parking hall. The bulldozing ended the era of a pyramid shaped hamburger kiosk that was located in the middle of the courtyard. Also the easternmost building of the shopping center, where an R-kioski convenience store and a shoemaker traded, was demolished. The National Board of Antiquities analysed all shopping centers in Finland in year 2002. The board found the shopping center of Munkkivuori to be in the top of the first class in functionality as well as in cultural value. Especially, the so-called pavilions were classified as cultural heritage and protected in the plan of site.

=== Church and parish ===
Regional parish work commenced already during the construction phase of Munkkivuori suburb. The first parish premises were at a basement floor of housing cooperative Porintie 3. Regular divine services were carried out under the permission of the diocese. At first, Munkkivuori as well as the neighboring quarters of Pitäjänmäki and Munkkiniemi were part of the parish of Huopalahti. The parish of Huopalahti was divided and the independent parish of Munkkiniemi, of which Munkkivuori was part of, was born in 1961. Two years later the church of Munkkivuori was completed in the next block west to the shopping center. The church was designed by Olavi Kantele and inaugurated by Bishop Martti Simojoki on 22 December 1963. The bell tower with its three bells has been a prominent landmark in Munkkivuori ever since. Åke Hellman designed the mosaic altarpiece named Fiat Voluntas Tua (Let Thy Will Be Done) in 1965. The 30-stop pipe organ manufactured by Kangasalan Urkutehtas was acquired in the same year.

As a natural continuum of the church, the parish of Munkkivuori became independent from the parish of Munkkiniemi in 1967. Mr. Eero Saarinen established the first post of the vicar of Munkkivuori. When he retired in 1991, Mrs. Silja Forsberg was elected as his successor. Year 1997 saw a substantial renovation of the church hall and the parish house right next to the main church building. In 2008 the parish of Munkkivuori had nearly 5 000 members which made the percentage of parishioners one of the highest in Helsinki. Munkkivuori parish was annexed back to the neighbouring parish of Munkkiniemi 1 January 2011 making the total of number of Munkkiniemi parishioners 11 300. The quarters of Niemenmäki and Talinranta were part of the parish of Munkkivuori and thus also became annexed. The last person to hold the post of the vicar of Munkkivuori was Mr. Raimo Majlander who was elected in 2002 when Mrs. Forsberg retired.

== Huopalahdentie accident ==
The Court of Appeal did not change the sentence of the Huopalahdentie road killer

"The Court of Appeal did not change the sentence of the man who ran over a girl by a car on Huopalahdentie road. The Helsinki Court of Appeal did not alter the 18 months prison sentence without chance of parole adjudged by the district court more than a year ago. The fatal accident took place on Huopalahdentie on August 2002, when a man in his thirties disregarded the instructions of a red traffic light. The girl run over on a pedestrian crossing was killed. The parents of the girl demanded to raise the sentence to two years. The man who drove the car demanded to commute the verdict issued by the district court. The man denied explicitly running a red light but the Court of Appeal stated that it was substantiated that the lights had been red at least five seconds at the moment the man crossed the pedestrian crossing. There was a 50 km/h speed limit at the site of the incident. The man agreed in the Court of Appeal that the speed of the vehicle he was driving was so high that he would not have been able to stop the car before the junction."

— Helsingin Sanomat, 21 May 2004. Translated from Finnish.

On a clear summer day on 13 August 2002, a nine-year-old girl crossing Huopalahdentie road in a pedestrian crossing was run over by a car and killed. The girl and her seven-year-old friend were reportedly on their way from a bookstore in the shopping center. They had been shopping for school equipment for the next day that was to be the first school day of the semester. A male driver of a black tuned Audi S3 Quattro car, a 32-year-old CEO, was driving in the left lane when he approached the intersection that the girls were crossing. A stationary car was waiting to turn right, towards the shopping center, on the right lane. This car blocked the Audi driver's view on the pedestrian crossing leaving the driver unaware of the little girl walking behind the stationary car. As a result of the impact the girl was thrown 20 metres (66 ft) to the middle of the intersection and died regardless of the first aid given by the ambulance personnel. The coordinates of the accident scene are 60°12′18.71″N 24°52′49.66″E.

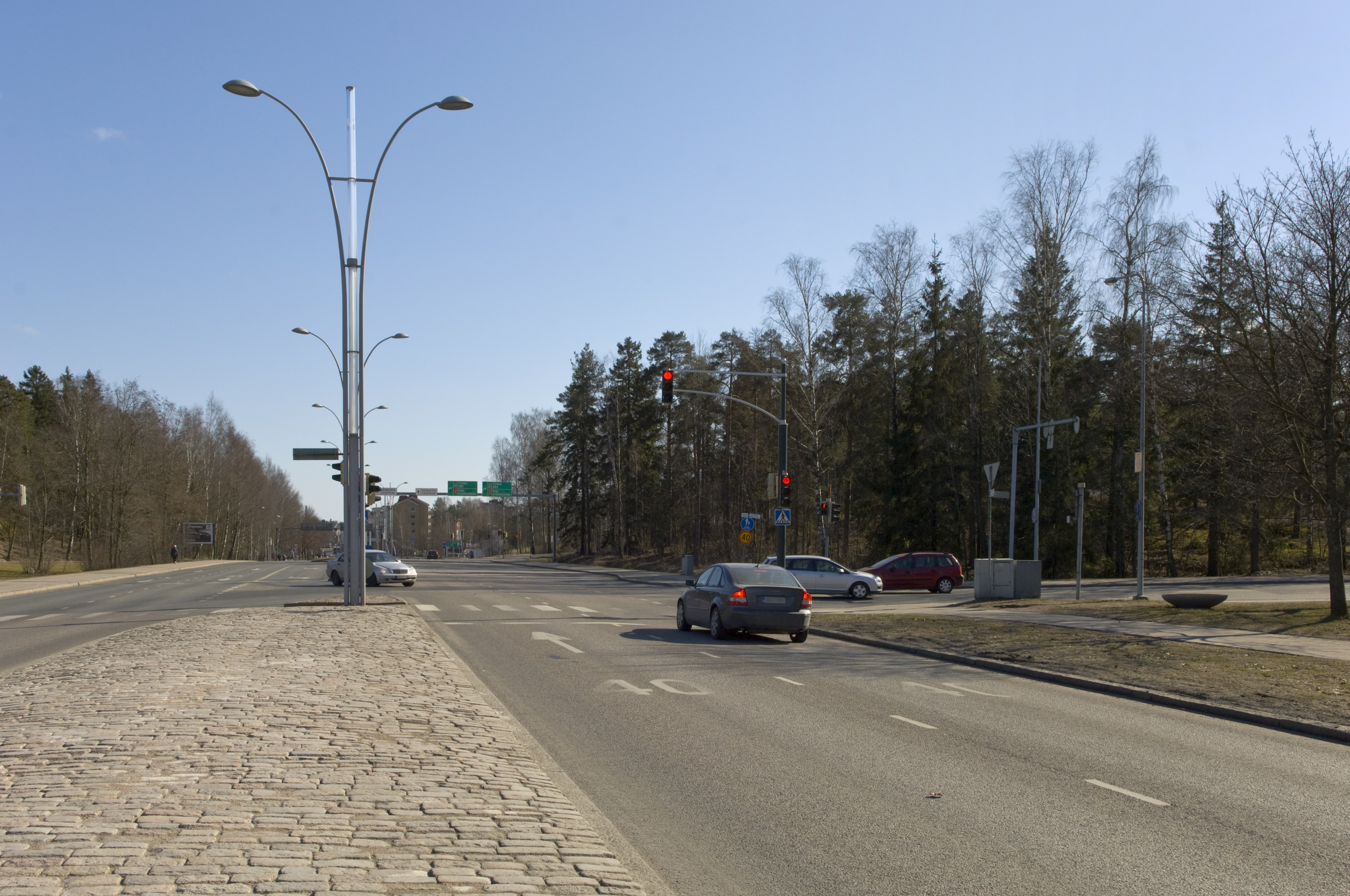
The accident site i.e. the intersection of Huopalahdentie (towards the camera) and Ulvilantie (on the right) in 2009. The girls were crossing the road from the right to the left. A stationary car, as in the photograph, was in the right lane. The cars in the photograph are not related to the accident.

The speed limit of Huopalahdentie road was reduced from 50 km/h (31 mph) to 40 km/h (25 mph) two days after the incident. An idea to build a pedestrian under passage to Huopalahdentie road had been around quite a while but abandoned due to expected high construction costs, 1,2M€. The unfortunate events of 2002 actuated the construction project. The project was boosted by the fact that a similar accident took place on Huopalahdentie road almost four years earlier. In this accident, an eight-year-old girl was lethally run over by a bus. The bus driver admitted right away that he had disrespected the red light.

The 2002 accident increased public awareness of irresponsible driving and gave birth to Internet and newspaper discussion on loosened traffic discipline in Finland. The residents of the neighbourhood organized a demonstration by Huopalahdentie road and set off a nationwide traffic campaign named "Pysähdy ajoissa - Stanna i tid" ("Stop in time"). The campaign was joined by Liikenneturva and Yleisradio and was awarded the best traffic safety act of the year. The pedestrian under passage from Niemenmäki to the shopping center was completed in 2008. It eliminates the need to cross over the heavily trafficked Huopalahdentie road and thus increases road safety of pedestrians.

Soon after the tragedy, newspapers published news about the company the driver was working for. It turned out that the company was the importer and a reseller of illegal street racing movies called Getaway in Stockholm and that one copy of the series was found from the glove compartment of the Audi involved in the accident. In a later interview the Audi driver claimed that the videocassettes were for retail and that he himself did not own the copy found from the glove compartment. He was found guilty of Negligent homicide and reckless driving. The Court of Appeal concluded that he had failed to stop for a red light but the court could not prove that the driver had been speeding. The driver himself, however, claimed that he had been running an amber light although according to the eyewitnesses he was running a red light and speeding. The driver was sentenced to jail for a year and a half, and his driver's license was revoked until the end of August 2004. As a first-timer, he had to serve only half of the sentence i.e. nine months.

== Future ==
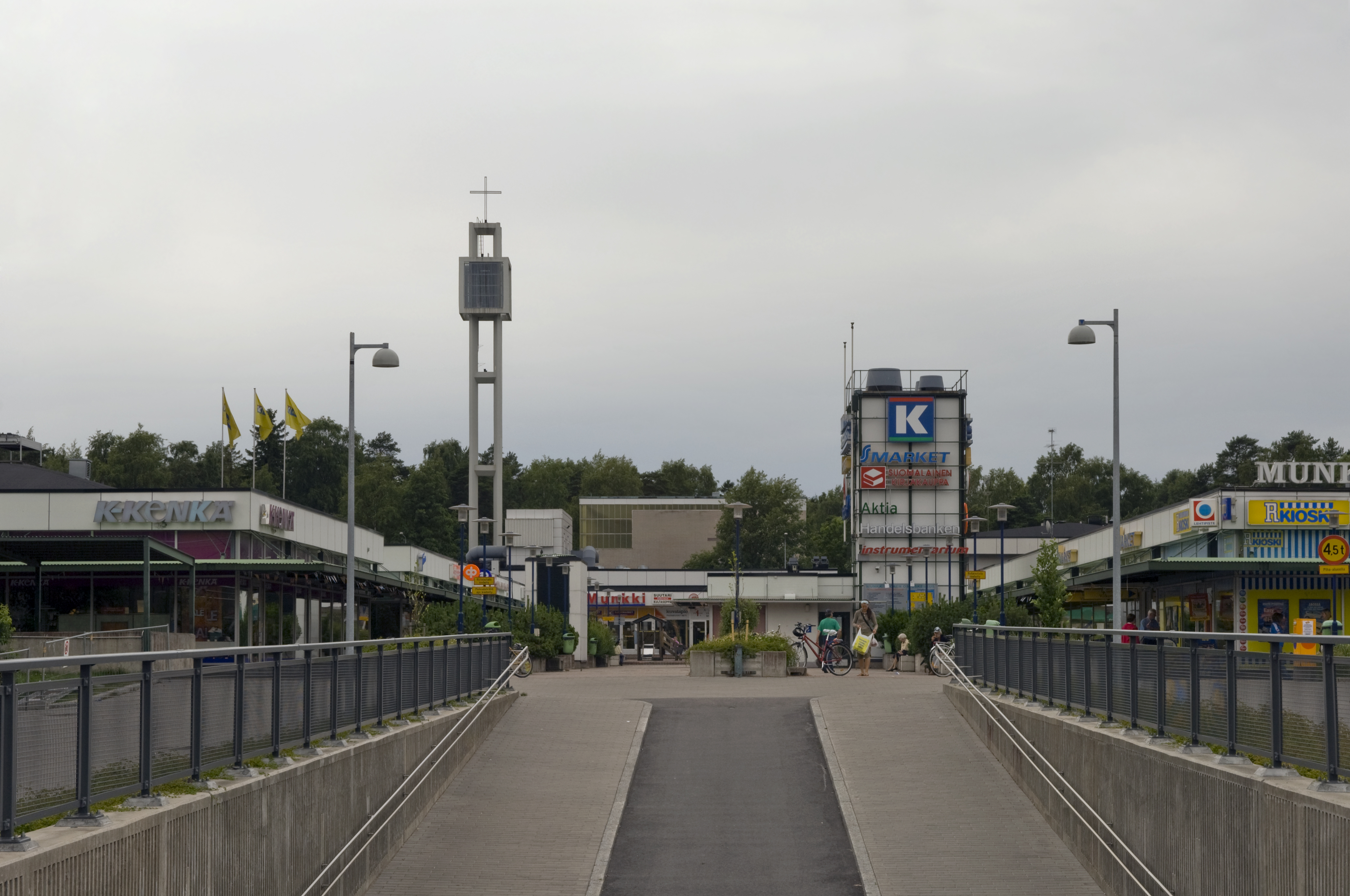
The extension of the north wing (on the right) of the shopping center has been under debate

A reticent period in the history of the shopping center followed the 1994 modernization. During 2001–2002, the board of Munkkivuoren Ostoskeskus Oy started to discuss how to cope with future challenges. Many of the ageing shopping centers around Finland had seen a downturn as they failed to develop a strategy to compete with modern shopping centers. In particular, the Sello shopping center that was to be built in Leppävaara, a short distance from Munkkivuori, was seen as a serious threat to Munkkivuori shopping center. The board concluded that it was essential to provide modern premises for two supermarkets that would then in turn attract other services. A larger business area would result in the growth of the customer base. New parking spaces would need to add to cope with this growth.

Helsinki City Planning Department ("Kaupunkisuunnitteluvirasto") funded an architectural research carried out by a consulting firm between August 8, 2006 and December 20, 2006. Munkkivuoren Ostoskeskus Oy and the representatives of the surrounding real estate companies participated in the study. The purpose of the study was to a find a mutual agreement between different visions on and interests in the enlargement.

The study concluded that the shopping center cannot be enlarged without extending the building site northwards and thus realigning Naantalintie. The shopping center site is bounded by Raumantie road in the South, by Huopalahdentie road in the East and by Naantalintie road in the North and the West. In February 2007, The Helsinki City Planning Department started another negotiations based on the findings of the previous study. The negotiations try to determine whether Naantalintie can be realigned or not. Since the shopping center is the first of its kind in Finland, it is considered to have architectural and historical value and is subject to architectural conservation. This fact combined with the limited size of the building site may render the enlargement plans impossible. Munkkivuoren Ostoskeskus Oy has not agreed on the terms of the architectural conservation. However, the officials promoting the architectural conservation have the last word.

=== Tram extension ===
The shopping center enlargement plans are supported by Helsinki City Planning Department's proposals to improve the reachability of Munkkivuori by public transportation. These proposals go by the name "Ratikka 2015" ("Tram 2015") study and include expanding the tram network to cover Munkkivuori. A new tram line number 5 from Kalasatama to Munkkivuori via Kruununhaka is brought up in the study. Alternatively the existing tram line number 4T could be rerouted to Munkkivuori. The tram would run on Huopalahdentie and Raumantie terminating near the Franco-Finnish school in both of these alternatives. Tram is the main means of public transport in Helsinki. Munkkivuori will become a more integral part of the city in contrast of being a suburb if the plan to extend the tram is to be carried out.

== Sources ==
- "Tilasto: Helsingin väestö iän mukaan" (in Finnish). Aluesarjat. 2016.
- Kumpulainen, Ritva (2009). "Oma Ostari 2009 - Munkkivuoren ostoskeskuksen 50-vuotisjuhlajulkaisu" (PDF) (in Finnish). Munkin yrittäjäyhdistys ry.
- "Munkkiniemen rakennusinventointi 2003-2005" (in Finnish). Helsingin kaupunginmuseo. 2005.
- "Ratikka 2015 – vaihtoehdot" (PDF) (in Finnish). City Planning Department. 2006-05-08. Archived from the original (PDF) on 2009-03-18.
- Räty, Lauri; Kangas, Lauri; Saivo-Kihlanki, Hellevi; Hillo, Kari (2009-11-06). "Helsinki tram system development study" (PDF) (in Finnish). Helsinki City Transport Planning Unit.
- "Tampereen keskustan ulkopuolisten 1960- ja 1970-luvun asuinalueiden inventointi ja arvottaminen" (PDF) (in Finnish). City of Tampere. 2010-04-07.
- "Munkkivuoren Ostoskeskus Oy" (in Finnish). National Board of Patents and Registration of Finland. 2011.
- "The churches of Helsinki" (in Finnish). The Parish Union of Helsinki. 2009. pp. Historia, Rakennus. Archived from the original on 2007-10-11.
- "The parish of Munkkiniemi" (in Finnish). The Parish Union of Helsinki. 2011. p. Taustoja, historiaa. Archived from the original on 2009-10-19.
- Kokko, Ulla-Marja (2002). "Liikennekuolemat synnyttivät kansanliikkeen" (in Finnish). Yleisradio Oy. Archived from the original on 2011-07-16.
- Ihamäki, Olli (2010-08-10). "Pysähdy ajoissa -kampanja syntyi äitien tahdosta" (in Finnish). Yleisradio Oy.
- Jansku (2008). "Huopalahdentien yliajo 13.8.2002" (in Finnish). murha.info. Archived from the original on 2011-12-28.
- Naskila, Antero (March 2006). "Huopalahdentien alikulun liikennesuunnitelma". Pyöräilyuutiset (in Finnish). Pyöräilykuntien Verkosto Ry. Archived from the original (PDF) on 2013-11-05.
- IKK (2003-04-25). "Pysähdy ajoissa -kampanja palkittiin" (in Finnish). Suomen Kansallisverkko Oy.
- "Pysähdy ajoissa -tarrakampanja alkaa Helsingissä" (in Finnish). Turun Sanomat. 2002-09-02.
- "Munkkivuoren toimistotalo" (in Finnish). Nordic Construction Company. 2009. Archived from the original on 2012-02-20.
- Karlsson, Linn (2007-08-03). "Snart står tunneln klar" (in Swedish). Hufvudstadsbladet.
- "Myydään - Uudistalo Munkkivuoreen" (in Finnish). Kiinteistötoimisto Ilkka Vuoksenturja Oy. 2011. Archived from the original on 2012-03-31.
