= Tali, Helsinki =

Coordinates: 60.213°N 24.856°E

Tali Tali
- Helsinki Subdivision
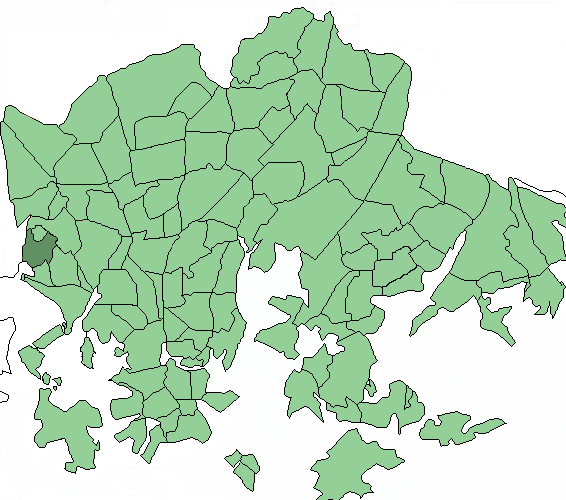
- Position of Tali within Helsinki
- Country: Finland
- Region: Uusimaa
- Sub-region: Greater Helsinki
- Municipality: Helsinki
- District: Western
- Area: 1.01 km^{2} (0.39 sq mi)
- Population: 1,078
  - Density: 1,064/km^{2} (2,760/sq mi)
- Postal codes: 00380 (?)
- Subdivision number: 462
- Neighbouring subdivisions: Pajamäki, Pitäjänmäen teollisuusalue, Munkkivuori, Talinranta, Vanha Munkkiniemi, Espoo

Tali (Swedish: Tali) is a neighbourhood located in Pitäjänmäki district of Western Helsinki, Finland.

As of 2008, Tali has 1,078 inhabitants living in an area of 1.01 km^{2}.

The race track hosted the steeplechase eventing equestrian competition for the 1952 Summer Olympics.
