= Murder of Susanne Lindholm =

Unsolved homicide in Finland

Susanne Lindholm
- Born: Susanne Helene Lindholm; 9 December 1950; Helsinki, Finland
- Died: 8 August 1976 (aged 25); Helsinki, Finland
- Cause of death: Strangulation
- Occupation: Clerk
- Known for: Victim of unsolved murder

The murder of Susanne Lindholm took place in the early morning hours of 8 August 1976, when Susanne Lindholm, a 25-year-old clerk at Helsinki Airport, was raped and strangled in the cellar of her apartment building at Sofianlehdonkatu 9 B, Käpylä, Helsinki, Finland. The crime received considerable publicity. Despite a large volume of clues and a few arrests by the police, the case remains unsolved. New investigations started in 2004 also led to an arrest, but there was insufficient evidence of the suspect's guilt.

Lindholm had spent the previous evening out with her sister and a male acquaintance – first in Haaga, then in a Helsinki nightclub – before ending up at Hotel Hesperia on Mannerheimintie. According to eyewitnesses, she was last seen outside the hotel at about 3:00 a.m., after which she walked to Helsinginkatu on foot. It is unknown whether Lindholm travelled to her apartment building, located about four kilometres from the hotel, on foot or by car. On 8 August, at 1:30 p.m., a tenant found her body in a cellar of the apartment building.

== Events ==
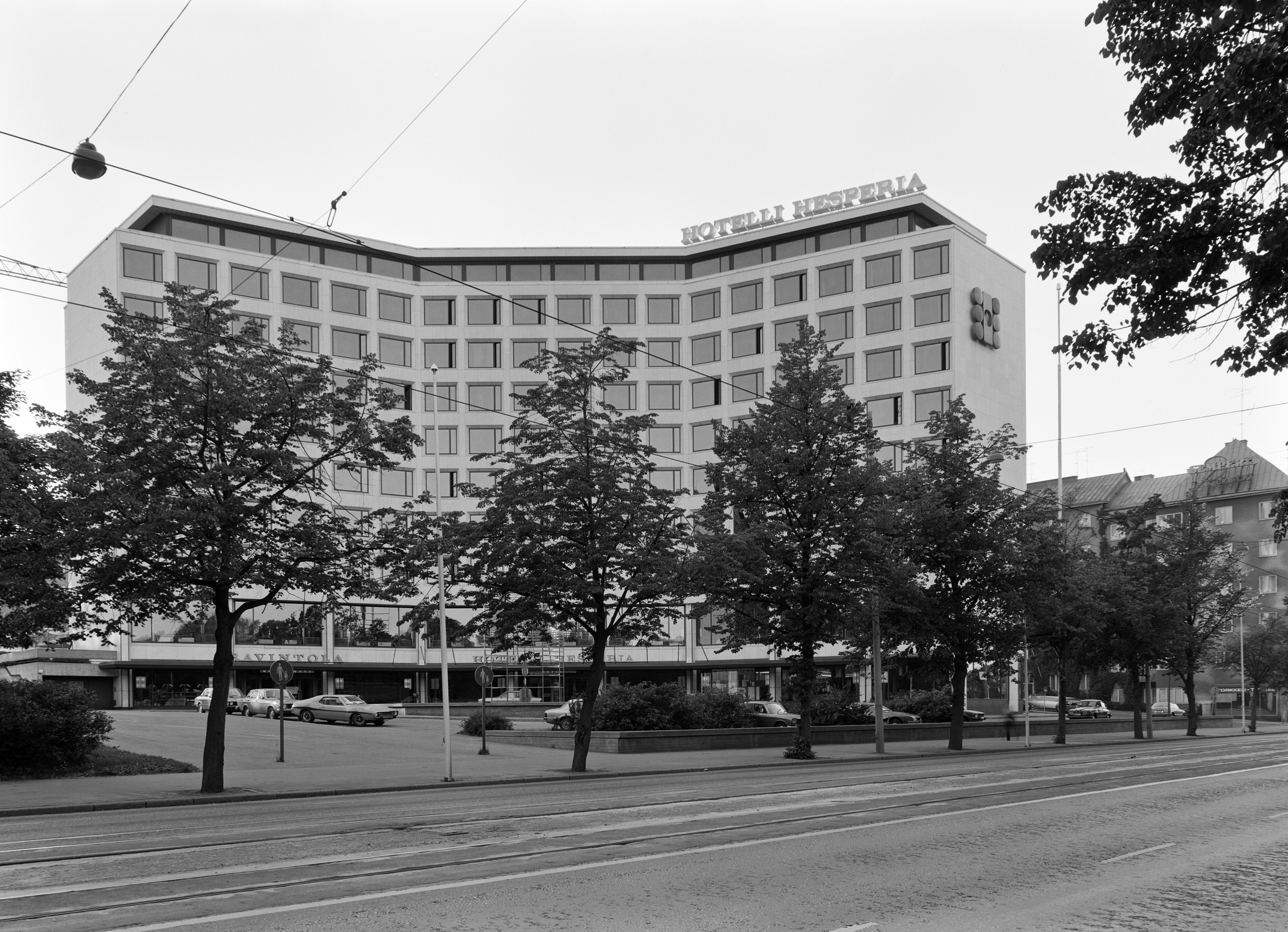
Hotel Hesperia (1978); currently owned by InterContinental Hotels Group

Susanne Helene Lindholm (born 9 December 1950) a baggage handler at Helsinki Airport, had lived with her parents and siblings in an apartment at Sofianlehdonkatu 9 B, Käpylä, Helsinki, since 1960. On the evening of 7 August 1976, Lindholm decided to spend the evening out. As none of her colleagues wanted to join her, Lindholm asked a male friend in Haaga to give her a ride to western Helsinki.

Lindholm started out her evening with her sister Camilla at a hotel in Haaga after 10:00 p.m. From there, the sisters went to the Helsinki Club, located on Mannerheimintie in the Helsinki city centre, where Susanne met a Norwegian man (b. 1947) who was on a business trip in Finland. Susanne and the man left the Helsinki Club and went to his room at Hotel Hesperia, while Camilla left them on their own at the Helsinki Railway Square at 1:20 a.m. and took the last bus back to Käpylä. At Hotel Hesperia, Susanne briefly shared whiskey with the Norwegian man before deciding to go home at 3:00 a.m. Although she refused to bring the man home with her, they exchanged phone numbers and arranged a date for the next day.

At around 3:10 a.m., Lindholm was observed by two male students standing outside Hotel Hesperia. According to police inquiries, she did not hitchhike and walked along Mannerheimintie to nearby Helsinginkatu. This would be the last time she was seen alive. The last direct bus line to Käpylä, four kilometres from the hotel, was around 1:20 a.m., but on other lines, she would've arrived approximately around 2:45 a.m. Lindholm had no money for a taxi, and no driver claimed to have picked her up.

At 4:00 a.m., a tenant at Sofianlehdonkatu 9 B was briefly awakened by the sound of a woman crying. Jouko Saarto, a tenant who lived under the Lindholm family's apartment, later reported that he heard footsteps from the stairwell, the sounds of a man and a woman, and the cellar door slamming at 2:10 a.m. The caretaker, who lived just above the front door and the basement, had heard nothing. The landlord, who lived above the basement, had been away since the night before. In 2021, Jari Koski, the head of the Helsinki homicide squad told the state broadcasting in a podcast that Lindholm had gone home by foot and that she met her killer on a sidewalk in front of the building where she lived. Lindholm had been seen arriving to her home building by foot before 4 a.m. and meeting a young man on the sidewalk whom she had started a conversation with.

== Discovery of the body ==
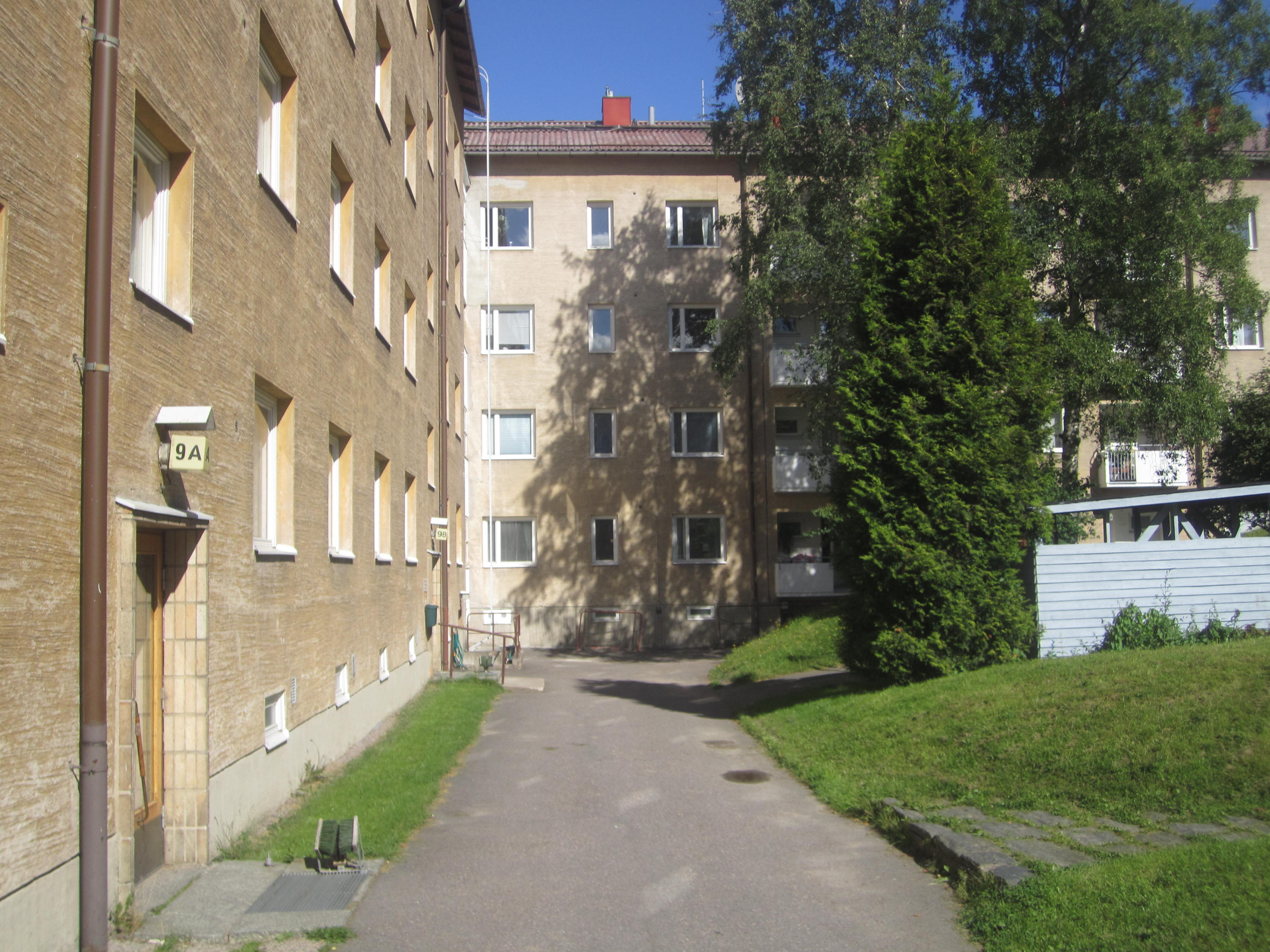
Sofianlehdonkatu 9's courtyard (2015); the cellar is located between stairwells A and B in the foreground.

The following afternoon, on 8 August 1976, Esko Savolainen, a newly arrived tenant at Sofianlehdonkatu 9 B, discovered Lindholm's bloody body while he was fetching a bicycle pump in the cellar. Her working day at Helsinki Airport had been scheduled to begin at about that time. Savolainen rushed to the caretaker, who called the police.

Lindholm had been raped and strangled with a Finnair shirt which was taken from her bag. Finnish police classified her murder as a sexually motivated attack, in which the victim had been treated in a cruel, inhumane way. She had fiercely fought back against her attacker but was ultimately overpowered. Reports differ as to the condition of Lindholm's clothes when her body was found: one account claims that her clothes were dishevelled, with a ski stick and a plastic child's shovel placed over the body, while Susanne's father, retired sports journalist Torsten Lindholm, said in a 1976 magazine interview that the body had been neatly covered in her work coat and a green Finnair jacket, which she kept on her shoulders.

== Investigation ==
The incident was immediately handed over to experts: for example, the Helsinki Criminal Police's car set off from the police exhibition for the 150th anniversary of their department. Lindholm's murder, and later a photo of her, were soon made public. Authorities wondered how and at what time the victim had entered the basement. In particular, the question of how Lindholm had been able to get home without money arose, as the walk home would've been too long. Another question was whether she had accepted a ride from her killer, or whether he barged in at the door. Detectives deduced that she had likely been killed within an hour of leaving the hotel. Based on research, the time of death was determined to have occurred between 3 and 4 in the morning. The police investigated every little possible clue, interviewing people whom Lindholm had met in the club and her neighbours. They also investigated the taxi drivers and other potential offenders, but, in the end, Lindholm's route and journey home remained unclear.

Initially, the investigating authorities were hopeful, as they were making steady progress. The suspect list was small, with two people being eliminated quickly because of their solid alibis during interrogations. The first suspect was a nervous taxi driver, picked up on Sofianlehdonkatu Street. The Norwegian who had kept Susanne company was also questioned, but he had a solid alibi and was quickly eliminated. The situation became increasingly difficult, as no solution could be found for months, and the number of suspects grew in the dozens, even hundreds.

The crime received considerable publicity, leading to numerous clues to the case. Hundreds of interviews were conducted on the subject. The police were particularly interested in men who were known to follow and abduct women, observing the premises of the Hesperia Hotel for such predators. Some men were detained for questioning, but all were released. At one point, a man with a scratched face was arrested. Since some skin was found under Lindholm's fingernails, it was assumed that she had scratched her killer's face before she died. With this announcement, the police were drowned in clues relating to centres treating scars in Helsinki, which were of no use. At some point, the investigators suspected a robbery, as two gold rings and a purse had been taken from the victim, but this theory was quickly abandoned. One year after the incident, the police continued to receive new tips every week.

The case remains unsolved. A new investigation was launched in 2004, but there was insufficient evidence for arrest. Ilta-Sanomat's Crime TV report in 2014 garnered new clues, but the two suspects' backgrounds were proven rock solid again. At the time of Lindholm's death in 1976, crime scene investigation was already advanced to such a degree, that police were in possession of material that could be analyzed with modern methods.

== Theories ==
Initially, due to a lack of a proper recording of her return home, police considered it likely that she had arrived home in a car. This theory was supported by the fact that Lindholm was portrayed as an exceptionally beautiful woman, who easily attracted attention. According to one man, Lindholm couldn't walk down the street without someone batting an eye to look at her. Her father said that Susanne often preferred walking on tramway tracks than walking on the sidewalk, precisely to avoid unwanted attention. She had been bullied as a child and was scared of strangers. Just a few months before her death, Susanne had told her sister Camilla that she would never enter a car driven by a stranger. Susanne used to also get annoyed easily and did not tolerate any kind of harassment.

The area around Sofianlehdonkatu 9 was a quiet, poorly lit area at the time of the event. There were also many small, but dense forests. According to Crime Commissioner Juha Rautaheimo, there are three possibilities of how Lindholm encountered her murderer: she had been followed and surprised at the entrance door; the killer was somebody who had given her a ride home, or they both met at the door. Rautaheimo questioned the scope of the official interrogations towards parties that turned up at her doorstep. He additionally believed that at the time of the killing, the perpetrator was relatively young and in good shape. Commissioner Martti Latikka also thought that the killer was less than middle-aged, and estimated that the killing wasn't pre-planned, but came as a means by which the rapist sought to overcome the situation. The judicial autopsy revealed that Lindholm had been violated in a particularly brutal manner, indicating that her killer might've been mentally disturbed. Väinö Rantio, Head of the Violence Bureau of the Helsinki Criminal Police, said that the perpetrator was an abnormal, sexually problematic and lonely person who avoids relationships. In spite of this, his age or occupation could not be determined.

Both police and Susanne's parents felt that the girl had been forced to enter the cellar, which was located behind three locked doors. However, going to the basement was unusual in the eyes of her parents, because Lindholm used to bring male guests into her room. In this case, the killer is believed to have been extraordinarily strong, as the 160 cm. tall Lindholm was said to have been a stubborn, athletic woman, despite her slim build. Instead, the caretaker theorized that the entry through the stairwell and the basement had been consensual, otherwise, there would've been a ruckus. In addition, her keys were found in her pockets. The cellar could be accessed only with a pair of said keys. The caretaker had checked the front doors at 9:30 p.m. the previous night and found them locked. No external doors could've been used at either day or night because there were doorbells. Commissioner Rautaheimo noted that it was very clear that Lindholm's keys had been used, as there were no signs of forced entry.

=== Serial killer theory ===
Lindholm's murder was long investigated as an isolated homicide, until similarities were noticed between her death and those of 41-year-old Seija Tuulikki Kekkonen in Kontula (6 December 1980) and 42-year-old Helka Onerva Ketola in East Pasila (30 January 1981). Like Lindholm, Kekkonen and Ketola had gone to the basement of the apartment building with the killer, where he would rape or attempt to rape the victim and subsequently kill them. In all three cases, the victim had encountered the perpetrator while returning from a nightclub to their home at night. According to Martti Latikka, who was the investigator-in-charge in 1995, the identity of a suspected serial killer was known to police, but there was insufficient evidence to arrest him. However, there are also divergent opinions as to whether all killings were committed by a single person. Opponents of the serial killer theory argue that there are too many differences in how each victim was killed. Both Lindholm and Ketola were strangled and raped. While details of Kekkonen's death weren't released to the public, it is said that she died in a similar way to Ketola.

In 1982, authorities investigated the sexually motivated crimes of a bus driver living in Espoo named Jalo Eetu Seppänen (b. 1944). On 6 July 1981, Seppänen raped and killed 18-year-old Helena Mäntylä in Haaga, five months after the killing of the last cellar victim. In this case too, the homicide was by strangulation, and as with the cellar murders, the perpetrator and the victim had encountered each other on their way home. In addition, identical items were taken from both Mäntylä and the cellar victims. Keeping "trophies" from victims is a typical trait of serial killers, who treat it as memorabilia. Seppänen stated that his actions were motivated by his desire to take revenge on women who had ditched him. His marriage had come to an end shortly before Susanne Lindholm's murder. Seppänen was long suspected of killing Lindholm, but was never convicted, and all three of the cellar murders remain unsolved.

The possibility of a serial killer was discussed as far back as 1979, when authorities tried to make connections between Lindholm's murder and that of 28-year-old Helena Korlin in 1979. Korlin, a travel agent who was described by the press as a girlfriend of Susanne, disappeared from Etu-Töölö, Helsinki in late March 1979. Her disappearance was the result of a homicide, committed by sex offender Carl-Erik Björkqvist (b. 1944), known as "Ceeli" and "Punavuoren Pukki". After having his advances for sex denied, Björkqvist strangled and thereafter dismembered Korlin. However, any suspicions about his involvement in Lindholm's death were eventually abandoned.

== See also ==
- List of unsolved murders (1900–1979)
