= Hakamäentie =

Road in Helsinki, Finland

Regional Road 100
- Yhdystie 100 (Finnish); Förbindelseväg 100 (Swedish)
- Hakamäentie; Skogsbackavägen
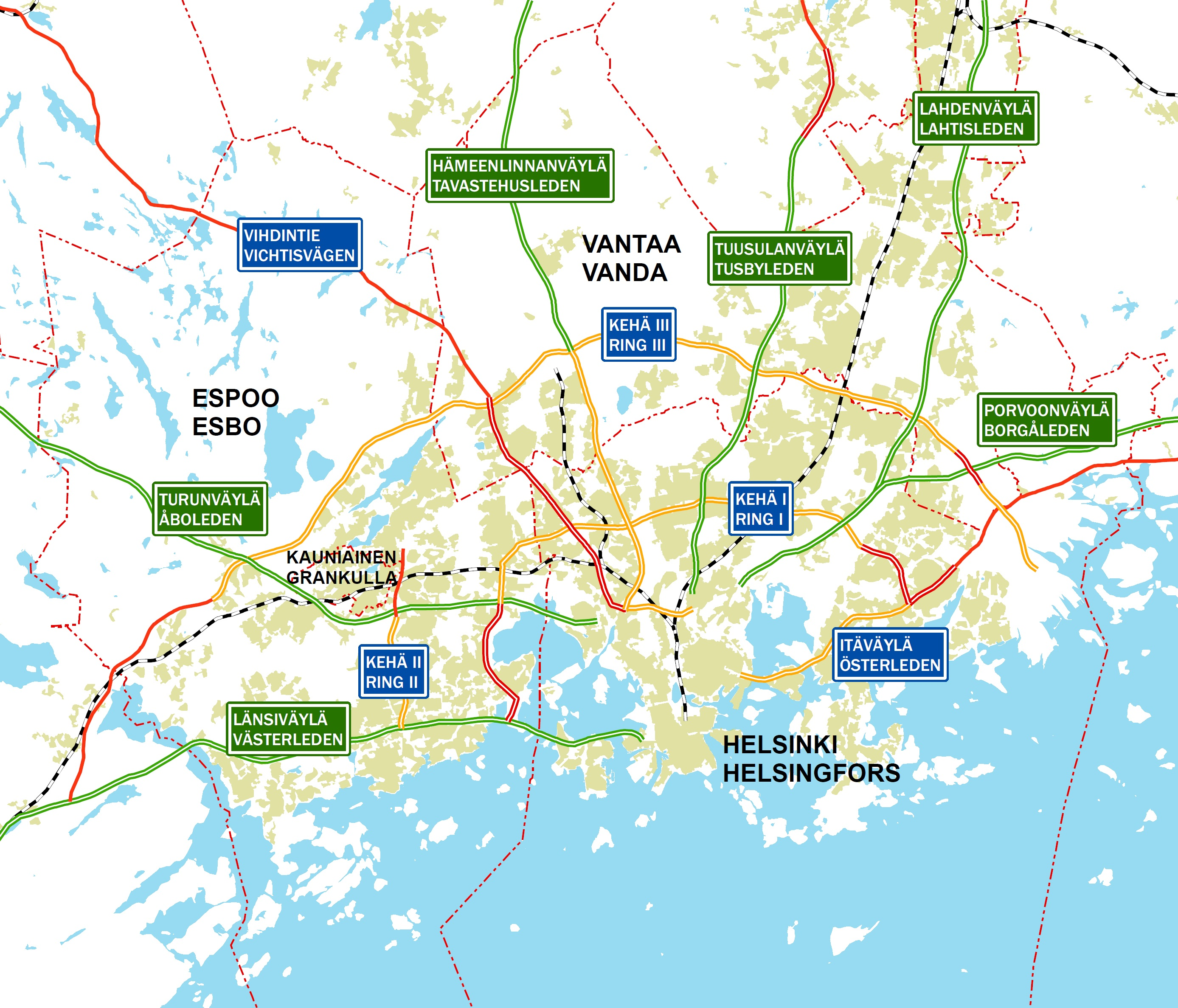

Route information
- Length: 2.6 km (1.6 mi)
- Existed: 1976–present

Major junctions
- From: Käpylä
- To: Ruskeasuo

Location
- Country: Finland

Highway system
- Highways in Finland

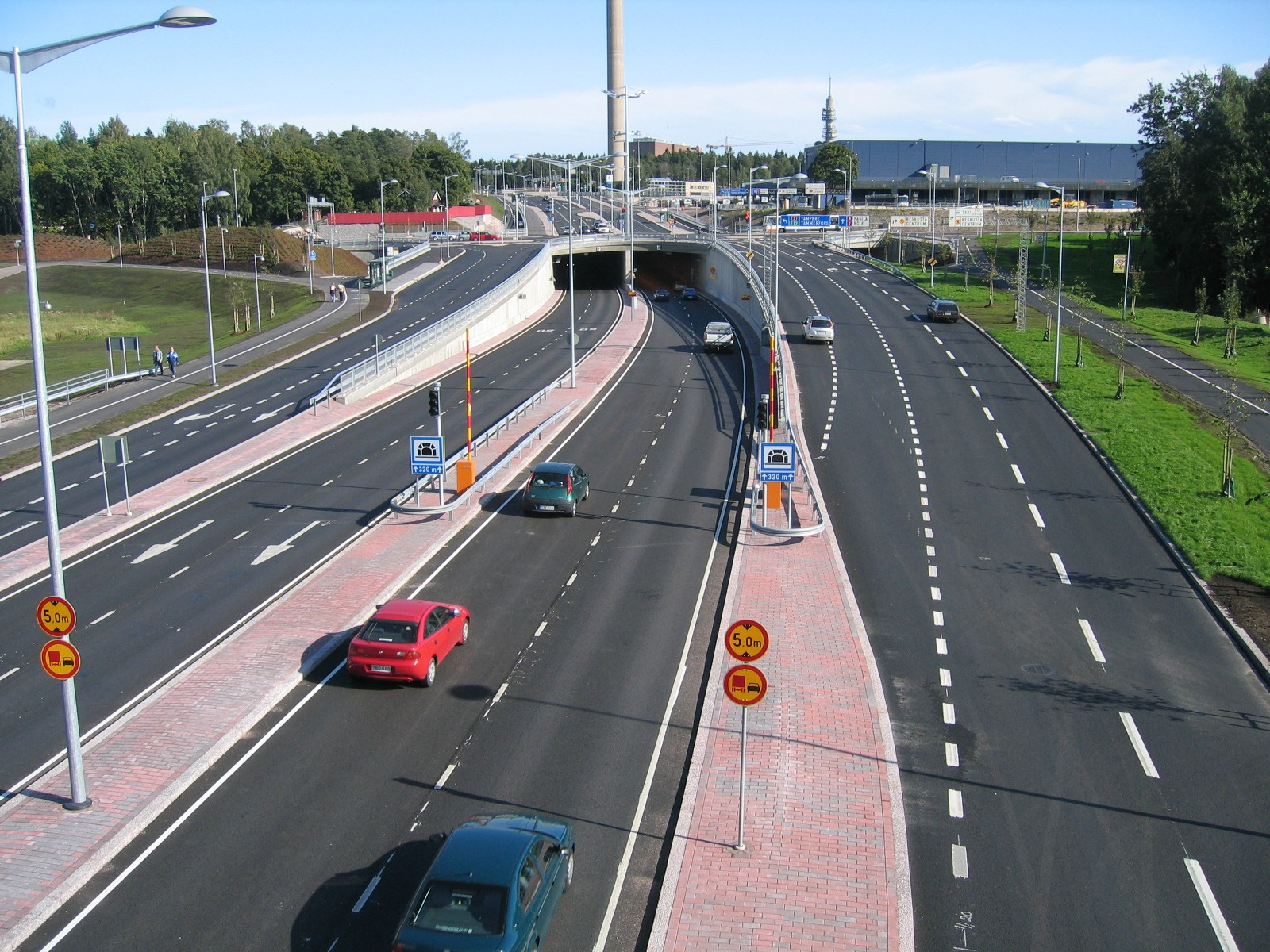
Hakamäentie starts with the Kivihaa tunnel.

Finnish regional road 100 (Finnish: Seututie 100, Swedish: Regionalväg 100), commonly known as Hakamäentie Swedish: Skogsbackavägen), is a regional road in Helsinki. It is an important cross-section between the northern districts of the Helsinki peninsula and part of the planned Pasilanväylä.

Hakamäentie leads from Käpylä north of east and west Pasila to Haaga. In the east, it is extended by the Koskelantie leading to Vanhakaupunki and Lahdenväylä. At the western end of Hakamäentie, there is a tunnel leading to Vihdintie and an interchange, to which the Mannerheimintie leading north from the center of Helsinki ends and from which also Hämeenlinnanväylä (national road 3) to the north and Vihdintie (regional road 120) to the west. There are a number of bridges along Hakamäentie that cross the main line, the beach line and the line that diverges from it, leading to the Ilmala service line yard. The road also crosses the valley in the Central Park and the outdoor roads run there. Hakamäentie passes Hartwall Arena and Ilmala railway station.

On weekdays, the average number of vehicles on the road in 2011 was 42,000 cars per day at Central Park. If road extensions costing around €500 million are carried out according to preliminary plans, almost 20,000 cars a day would be on the road in 2035.
