= Nordenskiöldinkatu =

Street in Helsinki, Finland

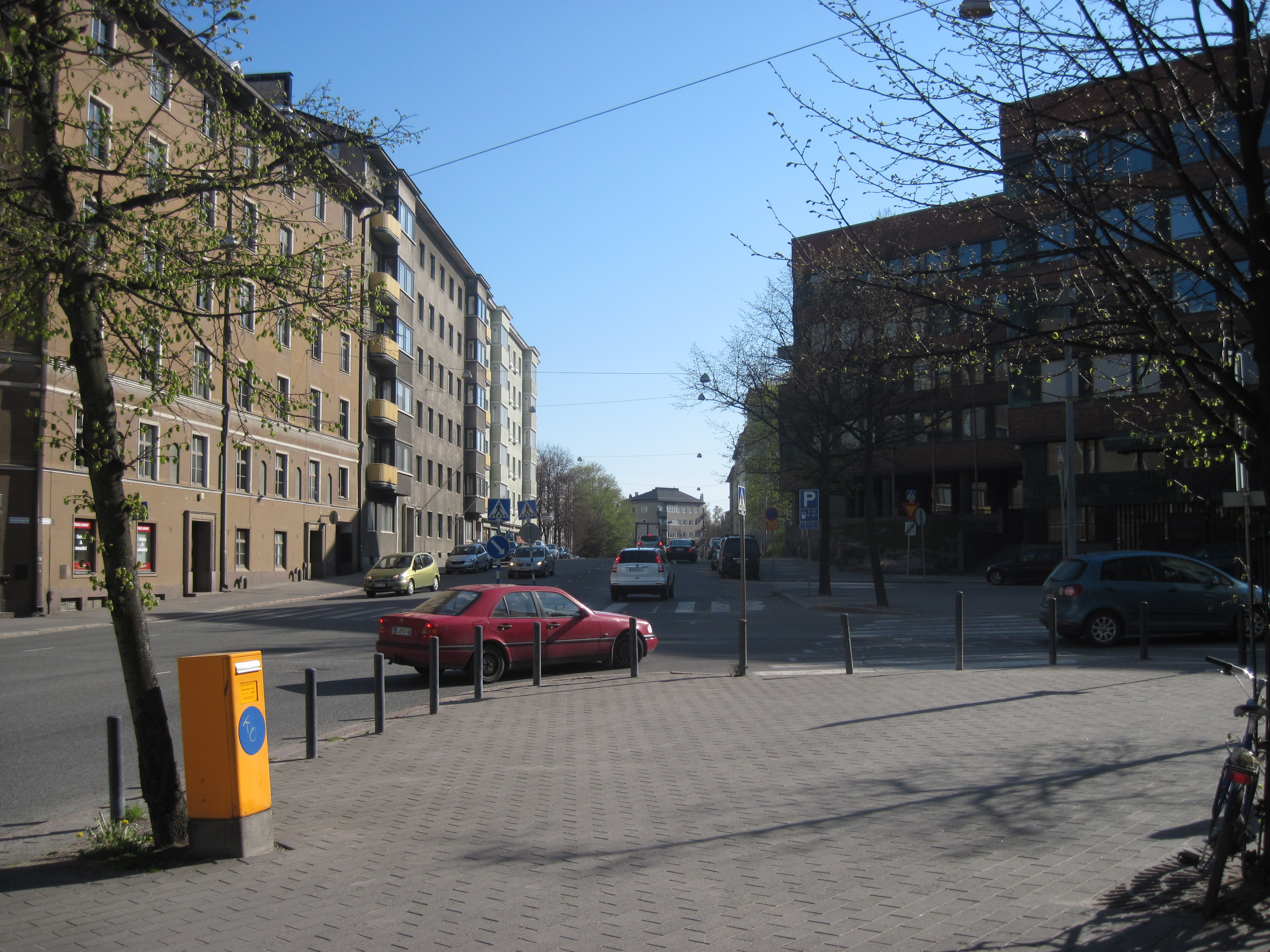
Nordenskiöldinkatu, looking west from Mannerheimintie. To the right is the KELA head office.

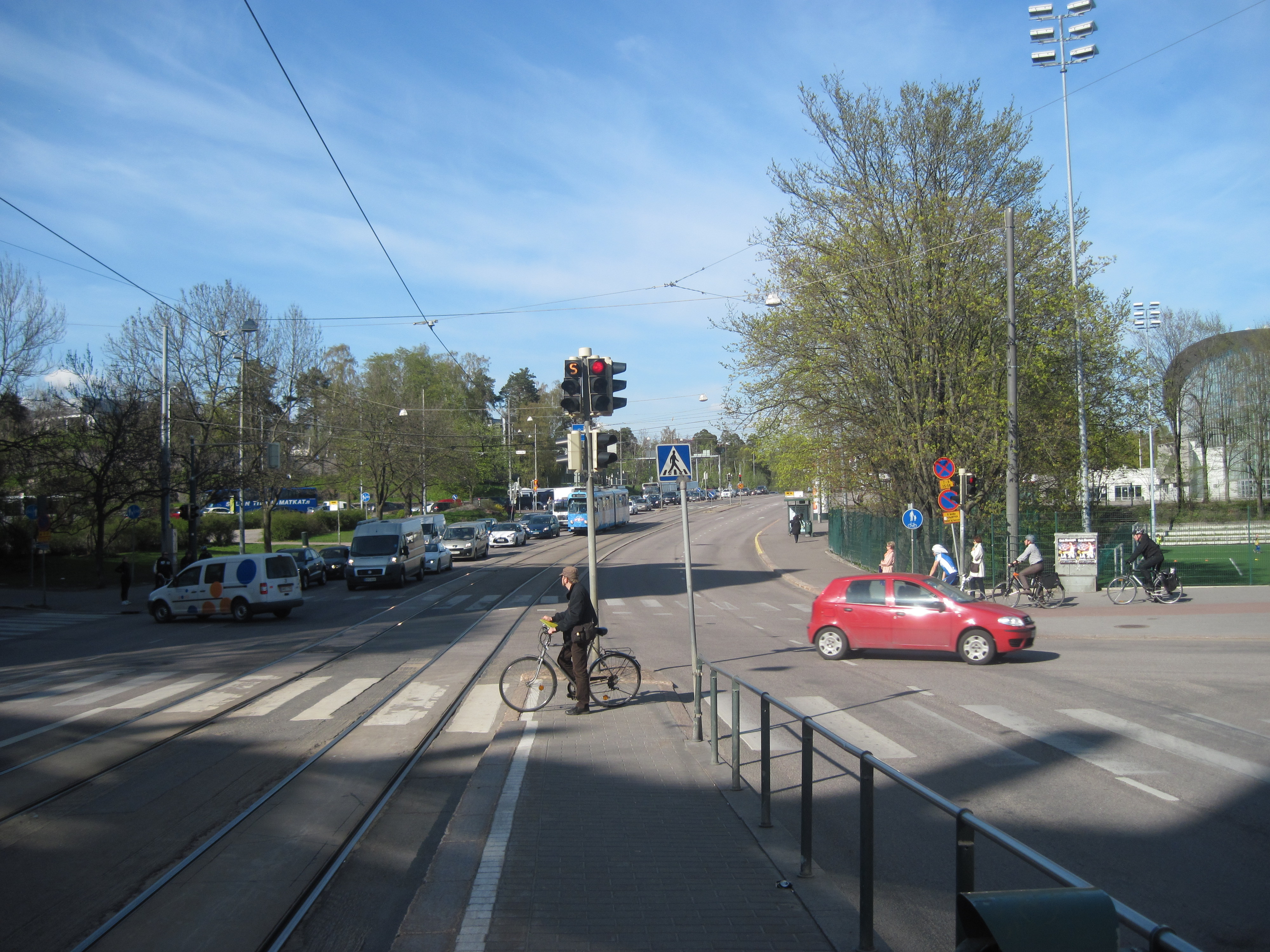
Nordenskiöldinkatu, looking east from Mannerheimintie. To the right is the Helsinki Ice Hall, to the left, behind the trees, is the Laakso Hospital.

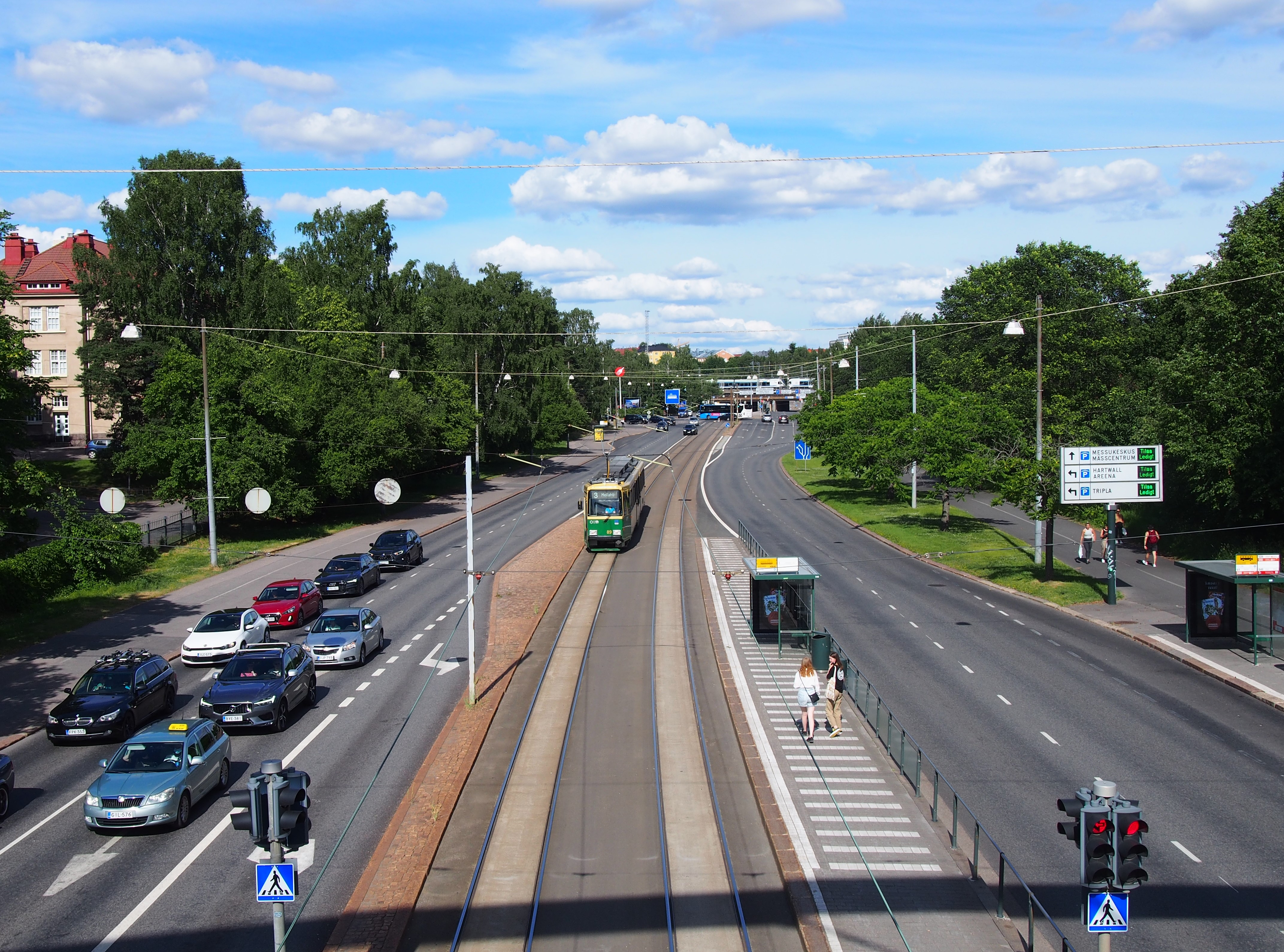
The eastern part of Nordenskiöldinkatu. To the left is the Aurora Hospital.

Nordenskiöldinkatu (Swedish: Nordenskiöldsgatan) is a frequently trafficked street in Helsinki, Finland, going from Taka-Töölö to Alppila and Pasila. It was named after the explorer Adolf Erik Nordenskiöld.

Nordenskiöldinkatu is a continuation of Mechelininkatu. Its western end is at the Nordenskiöld square in Taka-Töölö, where Mechelininkatu ends, and which is also connected to Topeliuksenkatu and Linnankoskenkatu. Its eastern end is at a railroad underpass, after which it changes its name to Savonkatu and continues towards Itä-Pasila. Nordenskiöldinkatu is the only street to run across Mannerheimintie keeping the same name on both sides.

Only the western part of Nordenskiöldinkatu has residential block houses, between the Nordenskiöld square and Urheilukatu. In this part are also located the Russian science and culture centre and the head office of KELA.

The eastern part of Nordenskiöldinkatu continues along the edge of the Eläintarha park. Along it are located the Helsinki Ice Hall and the Eläintarha Stadium. Along the street, at the edge of the part, is also a memorial for the victims of the Finnish Civil War. In this part of Nordenskiöldinkatu are located the Laakso Hospital and the Aurora Hospital, although the main building of the Aurora Hospital is at the other end of its lot, along Lääkärinkatu. Between the two hospitals is located the start of the Helsinki Central Park, which is only 200 metres wide at the Nordenskiöldinkatu end. At the park's southern end is a traffic park for children. Near the park the street is crossed by the Auroransilta bridge, which was opened to the public in November 2012.

East of Mannerheimintie, the Helsinki tram lines 2, 7A and 7B run along Nordenskiöldinkatu, and east of Reijolankatu also many bus lines going through Pasila. The western end of the street is located in Taka-Töölö. Its eastern part acts as a neighbourhood divisor, as Eläintarha is part of Taka-Töölö, but the Laakso Hospital lot and the southern part of the Central Park are part of Laakso, and the Aurora Hospital is in Länsi-Pasila.

Originally, from 1906, Nordenskiöldinkatu also included what is now Mechelininkatu, which was separated from it in 1917. The most eastern part of the street, east of Urheilukatu, has previously been unofficially referred to as Nordenskiöldin puistokatu.
