= Laakso Hospital =

Hospital in Helsinki, Finland

Coordinates: 60°11′30″N 24°55′04″E

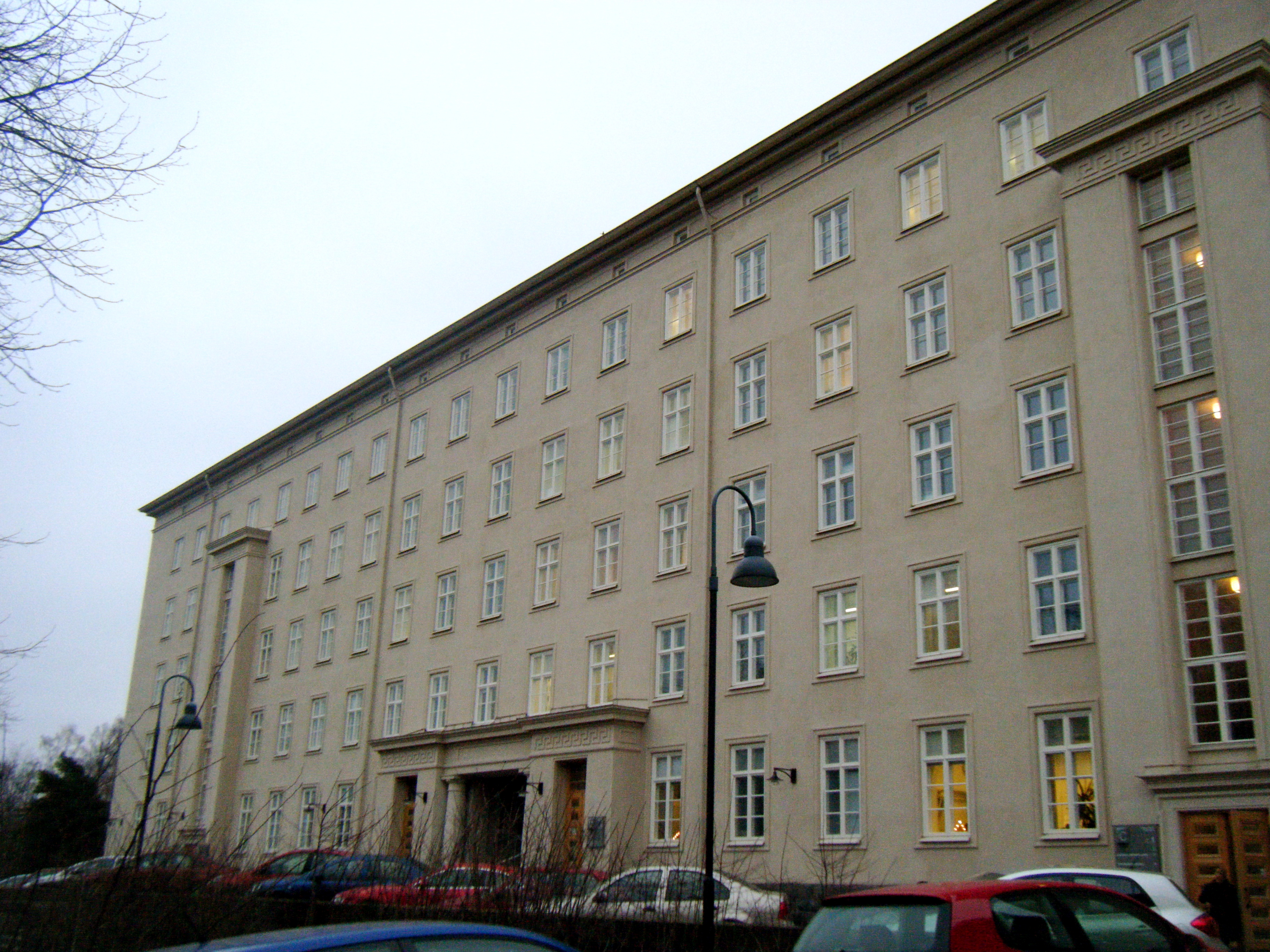
The administrative building of the Laakso Hospital.

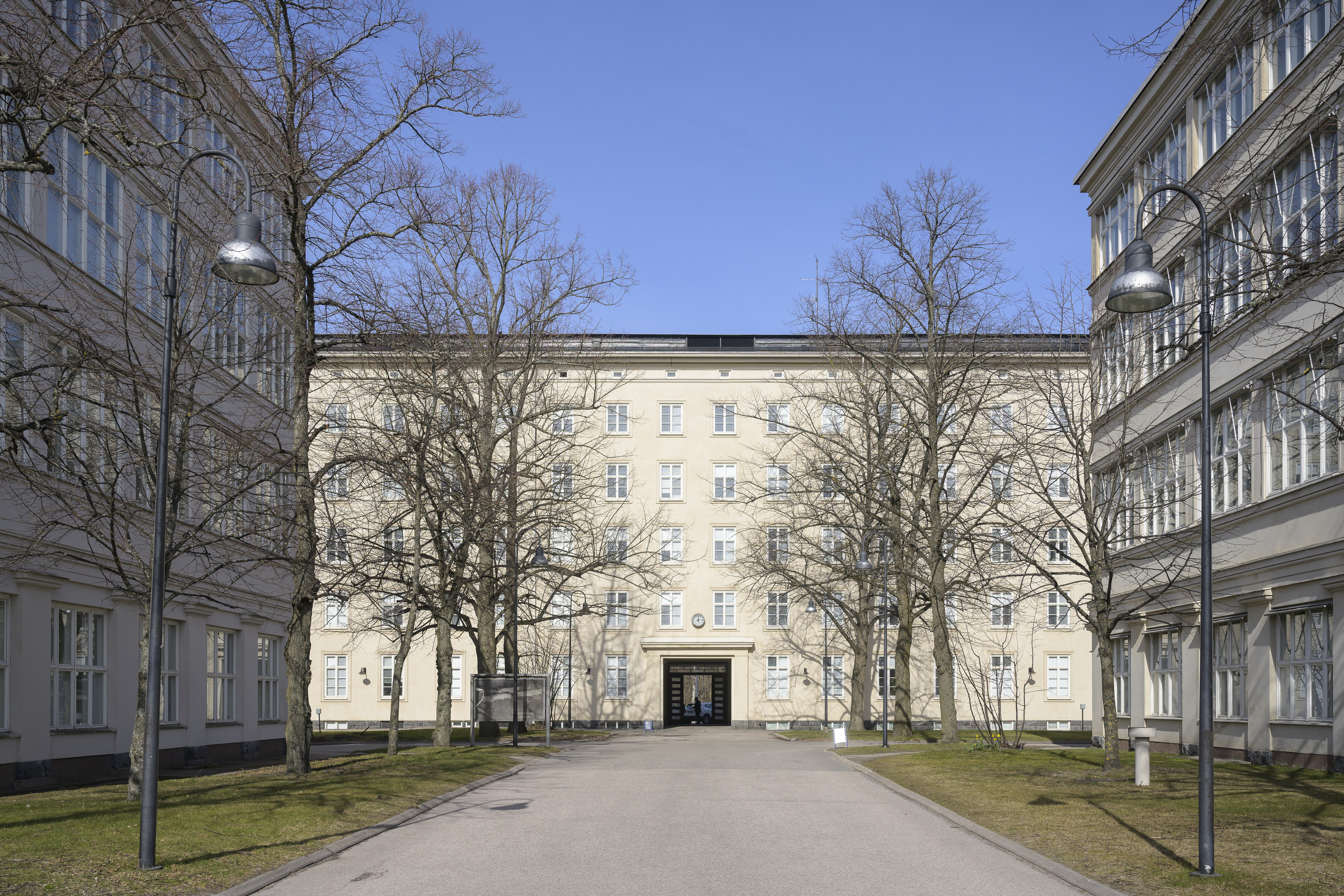
The Laakso Hospital.

The Laakso Hospital (Finnish: Laakson sairaala) is a healthcare station hospital located in Laakso, Helsinki, Finland. Its street address is Lääkärinkatu 3.

The Laakso Hospital has 13 departments for inpatients as well as a home hospital and outpatient clinics for internal organ diseases and neurology. The hospital also has an X-ray department belonging to the HUS hospital collective. Up until February 2022 the Laakso healthcare station was also located in the hospital area.

== History ==
=== Tuberculosis hospital from 1929 to 1959 ===
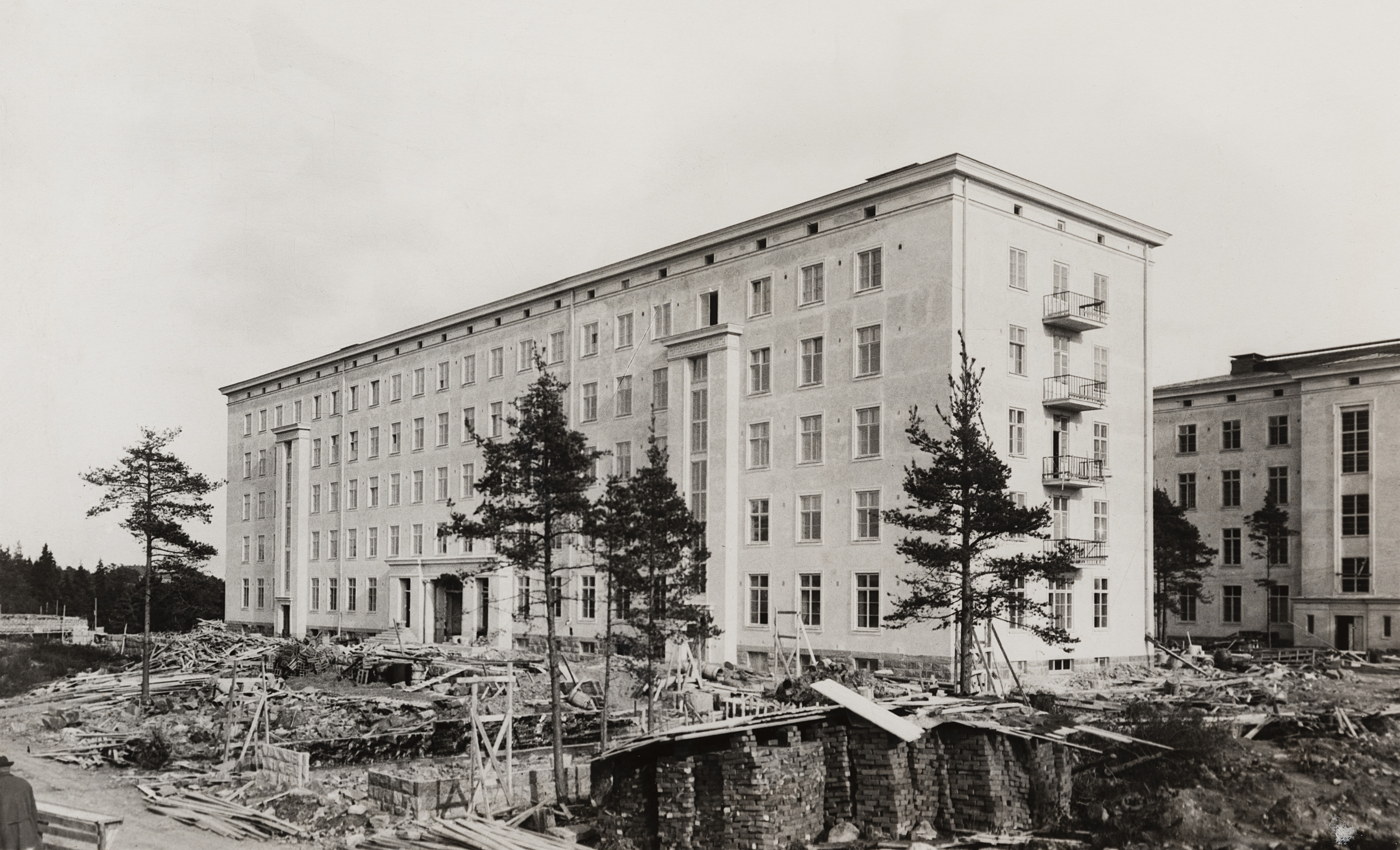
The Helsinki Tuberculosis Hospital, now known as the Laakso Hospital, nearing completion in 1929.

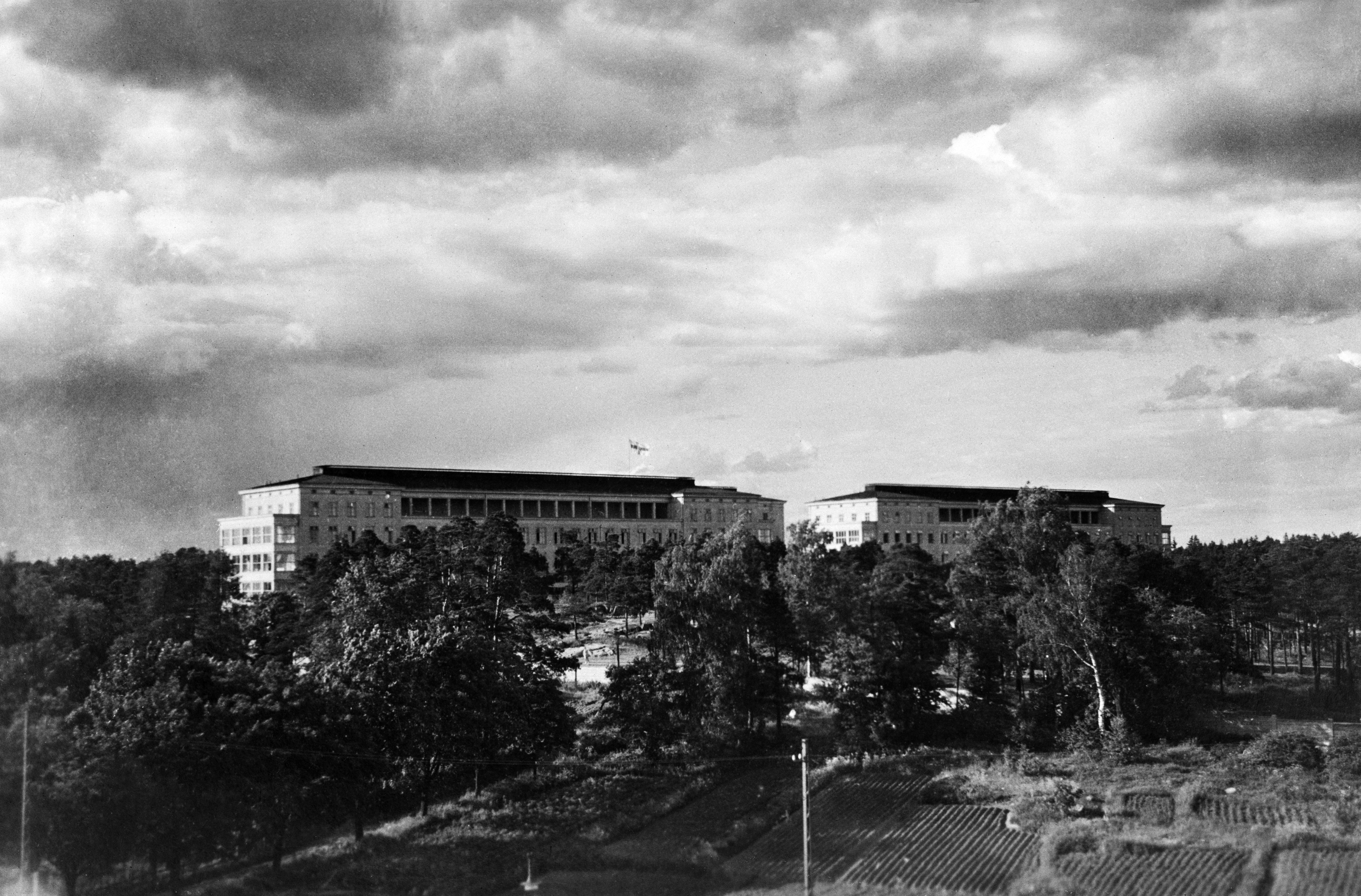
The Helsinki Tuberculosis Hospital, now known as the Laakso Hospital, in 1934. Terraces for outside air care, known as "halls", were located in both pavilions, the terraces on the upper floors were 55 metres long.

The Laakso Hospital was originally called the Tuberculosis Hospital and was built in 1924 to treat tuberculosis in the vicinity of the Infectious Diseases Hospital, now known as the Aurora Hospital. The hill covered in a pine forest was seen as ideal for recovery of patients with lung diseases. However, the area was located in the Central Park reserved by the city council, which could not be seen as being compacted any more. The issue was resolved when a 220-metre-wide passage was reserved between the Infectious Diseases Hospital and the Tuberculosis hospital, to allow for the Central Park to continue without being cut off. The architect Eino Forsman made a design for two hospital pavilions and for one administrative and residential building. The rock blasting work was started in 1925, and this year can be seen in the foundation of the buildings. The hospital was completed in 1929. The street leading to the hospital was named Lääkärinkatu ("Physician Street").

The hospital buildings have mostly remained in their original form despite repairs. The main building was taken into use in 1930 and the other buildings up to 1938. All of the 382 bed places and 38 places at the children's department were immediately filled up and at the start of the next year, there were already 100 new patients waiting for treatment. An important form of treatment was fresh outside air. Patients lay down at terraces or went for walks in the park. For the weakest patients there were heated halls to lie down in. The area was surrounded by a strong wall - also figuratively: tuberculosis was greatly feared and people avoided patients with tuberculosis. The Helsinki City nurse school was also located in the administrative building.

By an initiative from the Faculty of Medicine at the University of Helsinki, in 1930 the hospital started giving Candidates of Medicine tuition in treating tuberculosis. In 1945 three patient departments were transferred to the university for this purpose. As well as treatment for pneumothorax, surgical treatments were started in 1930 and antituberculosis medical treatment started after World War II. Because treatment generally lasted long, there was work therapy and hobbies available for the patients: handicrafts, book binding and carpenter and painting work and from 1946 also instruction in the Finnish, Swedish, English and Russian languages, accounting and typing.

During World War II, the Laakso Hospital also treated wounded soldiers and those with tuberculosis. During the bombing of Helsinki in World War II, the western pavilion was hit, breaking thousands of windows and leading to many departments being closed.

=== Laakso Hospital from 1959 ===
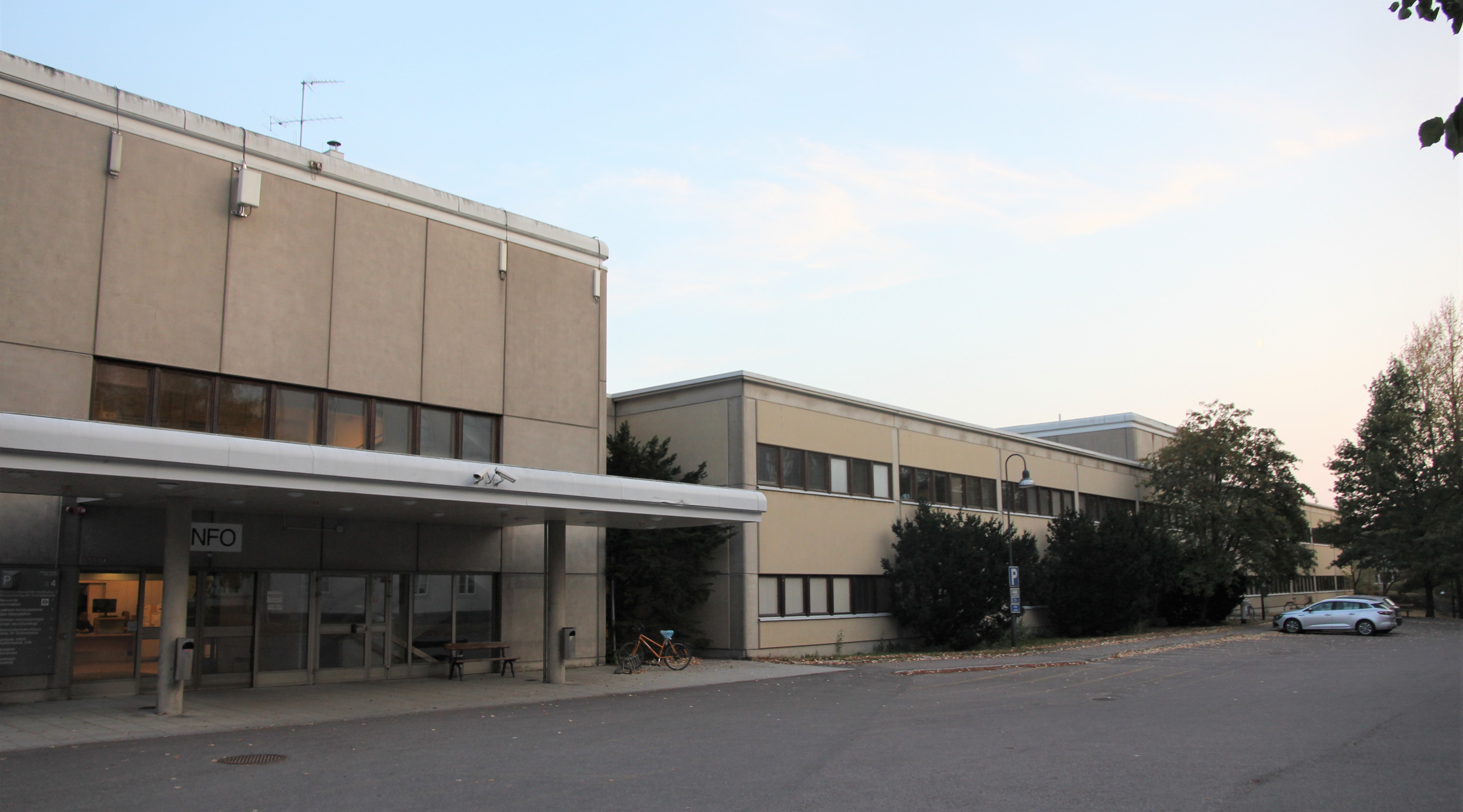
Building 4 at the Laakso Hospital. The P door can be seen at the front left. For example the Laakso healthcare station was located on the first floor of the background part of the building (R door).

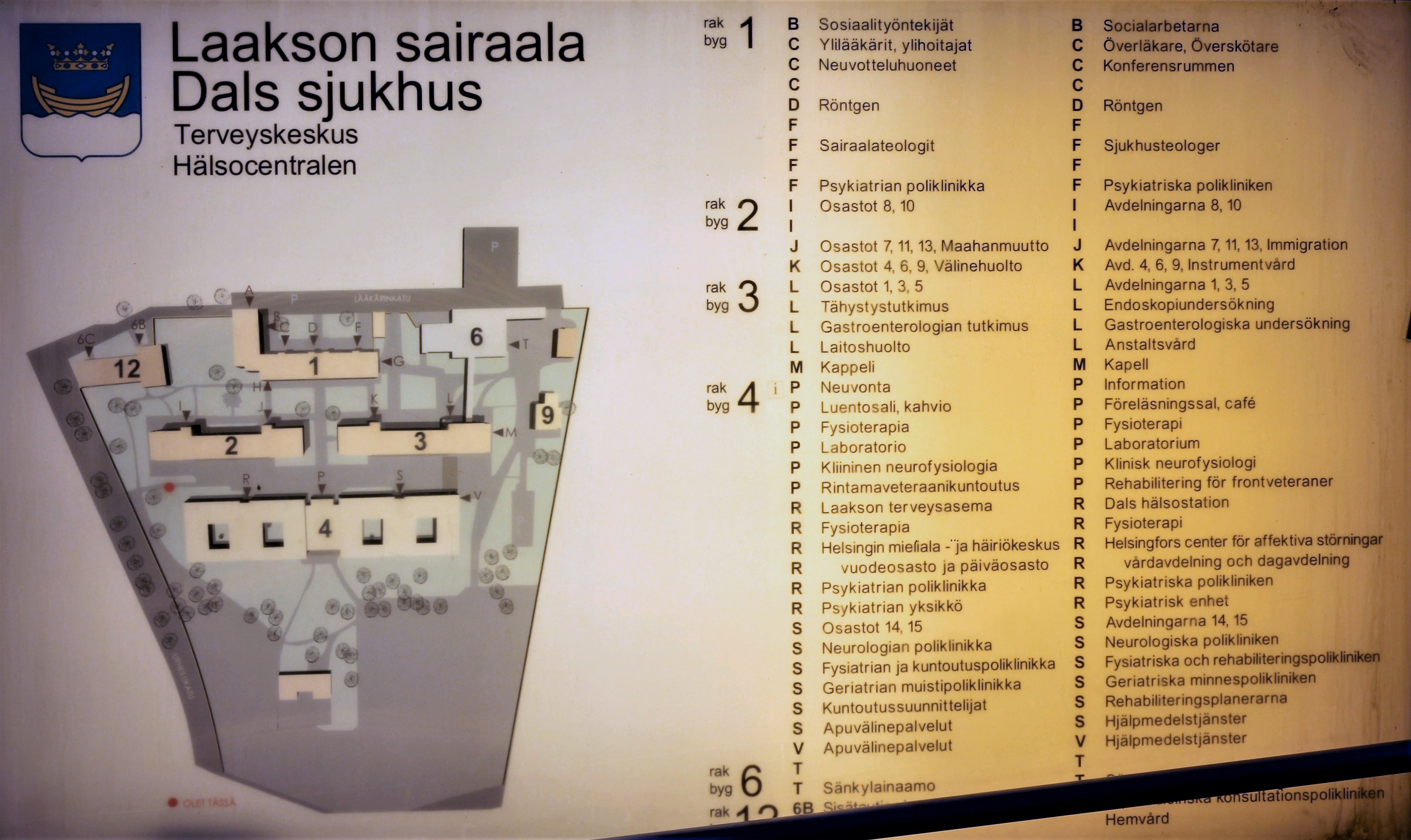
Guidance map of the Laakso Hospital area in 2018.

After tuberculosis diminished after World War II, the activity of the hospital changed with injections, mass inspections and medical treatments and in 1959 the hospital was renamed the Laakso Hospital. With the introduction of the folk health law in 1972, the hospital has served at the healthcare centre hospital of the western major district in Helsinki, also providing special healthcare for the inhabitants of the entire city. Currently the Laakso Hospital has departments for inpatients as well as a day home hospital and outpatient clinics for internal organ diseases and neurology. The hospital also has an X-ray department belonging to the HUS hospital collective and a HUS-LAB laboratory.

In the 1970s and 1980s additional buildings, apartments and a daycare centre were built in the area. The Laakso healthcare station was active in a building built at this time (building number 4) until 2022 when it was dismantled to make room for a new large-scale psychiatric hospital with 900 bed places.

=== Laakso Common Hospital from 2026- ===
The new Laakso Common Hospital for geriatrics and psychiatry will replace the somatic inpatient departments of the Laakso Hospital, part of the activity of the Suursuo Hospital and the psychiatric activity of the Aurora Hospital. As for HUS activity, the new common hospital will replace the Psychiatric Centre (previously known as the Hesperia Hospital) and the departments for children's psychiatric care. The first phase of the construction will be completed in 2026.

The service traffic for the new Laakso Common Hospital will be led from the street Nordenskiöldinkatu through a tunnel from the direction of the Aurora Hospital.
