= Erottaja =

Town square in Helsinki, Finland

Coordinates: 60°10′00″N 024°56′36″E

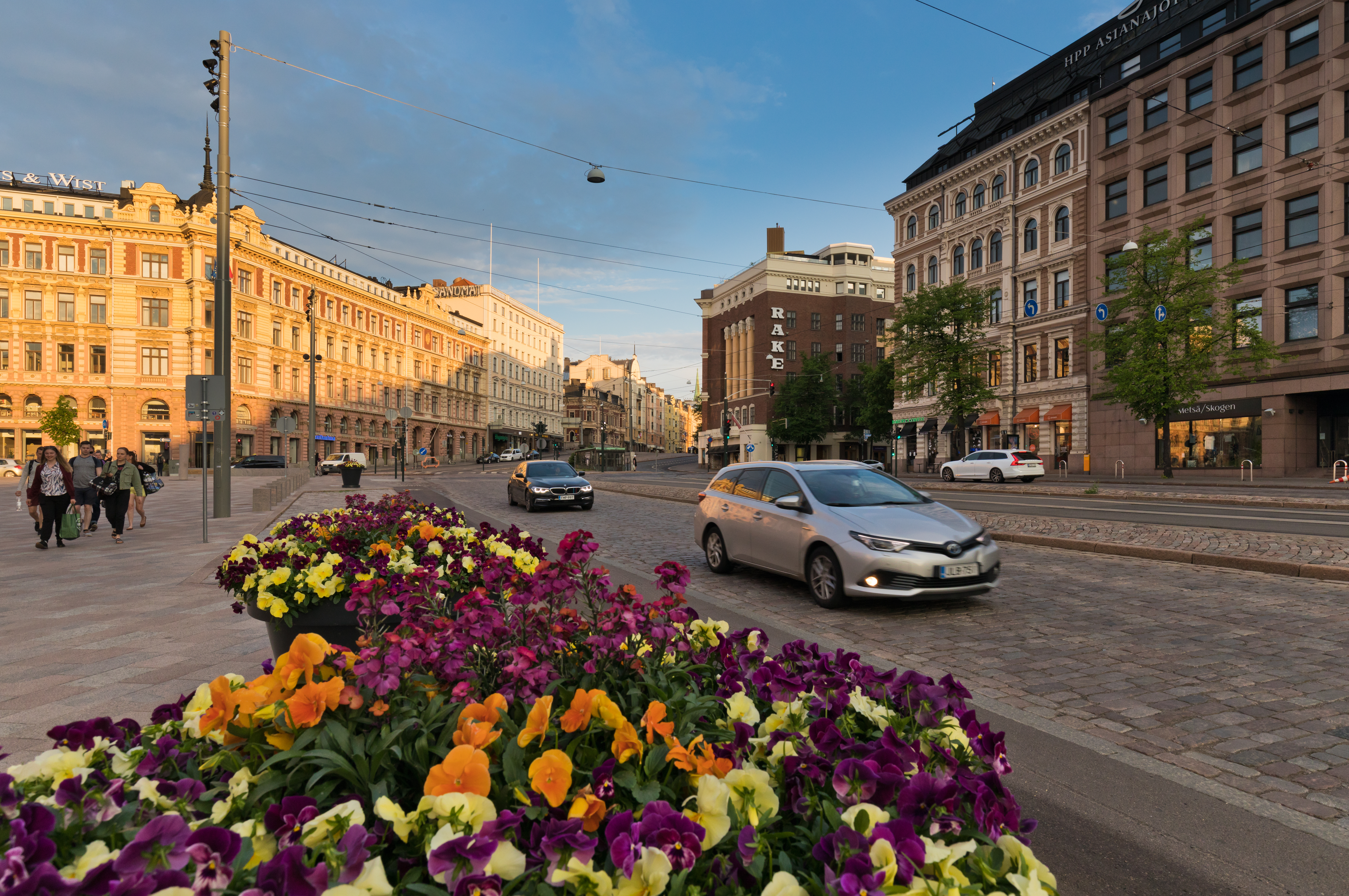
Erottaja square.

Erottaja (Finnish: [ˈerotːɑjɑ]; lit. 'the separator'), Swedish: Skillnaden; Swedish: [ˈʃil.naːden]; lit. 'the difference'), is a public square near the centre of Helsinki, Finland.

Erottaja square has been selected as the official geographic "zero point" of Helsinki. Distances to all other cities in Finland are measured starting from here. In practice, the square functions as the meeting point of central Helsinki's two famous streets, Esplanadi and Mannerheimintie. The square is the western endpoint of Esplanadi, with the eastern endpoint being at the market square. Mannerheimintie, the longest and most famous street in Helsinki, begins at Erottaja and continues northwest, past the districts of Töölö and Ruskeasuo, until finally merging with a highway leading outside the city. The starting points of both Finnish national roads, the Tampere Highway (E12) and the Lahti Highway (E75), are located approximately in Erottaja.

The name 'separator' originates from 19th century, when Erottaja separated actual city centre from Uusimaa (Swedish: Nyland) suburb.

There was also a minor bus station at Erottaja. Very few lines started or ended there, most of them started or ended at the Kamppi Center, at Elielinaukio or at Rautatientori. Helsinki route 20 (Erottaja - Lauttasaari) buses were a familiar sight for decades at Erottaja. Bus station as well as a well-known 'nakkikioski' (a kiosk selling sausages and other fast food) disappeared when the square was renovated in late 2010's.

The Swedish Theatre (Swedish: Svenska teatern, Finnish: Ruotsalainen teatteri) is located at Erottaja, at the western edge of the Esplanadi park. A sculpture named Usko toivo rakkaus (Swedish: Tro hopp kärlek), meaning "Faith hope love", by Eva Lange, was erected in front of it in September 2019.

Erottaja is also famous for being the most expensive lot in the original Finnish edition of Monopoly, even more expensive than Mannerheimintie (the second most expensive lot). This has earned the square fame even outside Helsinki.
