= Helsinginkatu =

Street in Helsinki, Finland

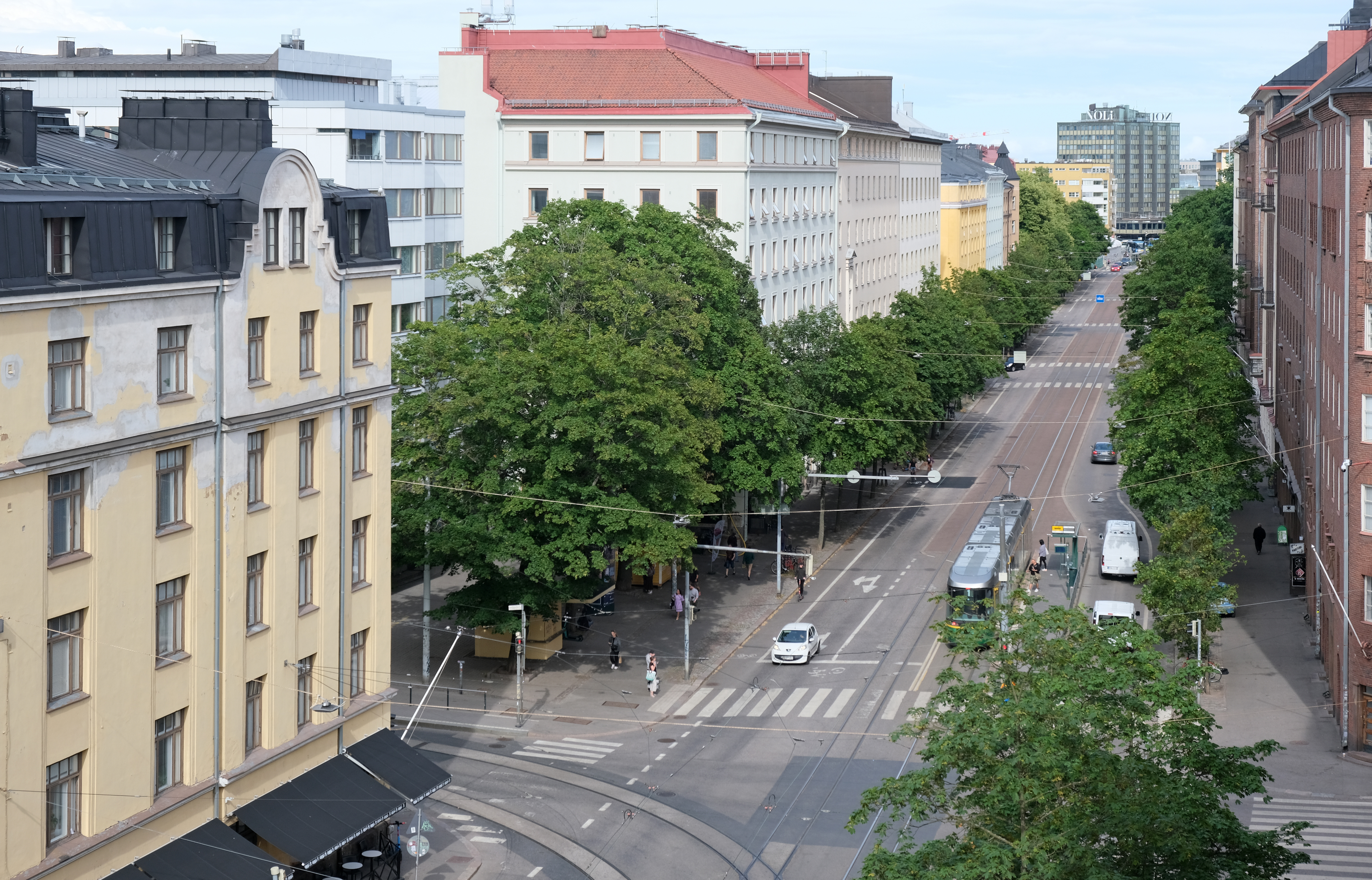
Helsinginkatu in summer 2022: it is an avenue from Sörnäinen curve to Kaarlenkatu intersection.

Helsinginkatu (Swedish: Helsingegatan, literally meaning "Helsinki street"; also called "Hesari" in Helsinki slang, which is also used as a nickname for Helsingin Sanomat) is a two-kilometre-long east-west-running street in Helsinki, Finland. The street runs from Hämeentie to Mannerheimintie. The street separates the districts of Kallio and Alppiharju, and the part west to the railway underpass belongs to Taka-Töölö. The eastern part of the street is a 30-metre-wide avenue, with buildings on both sides.

== History ==
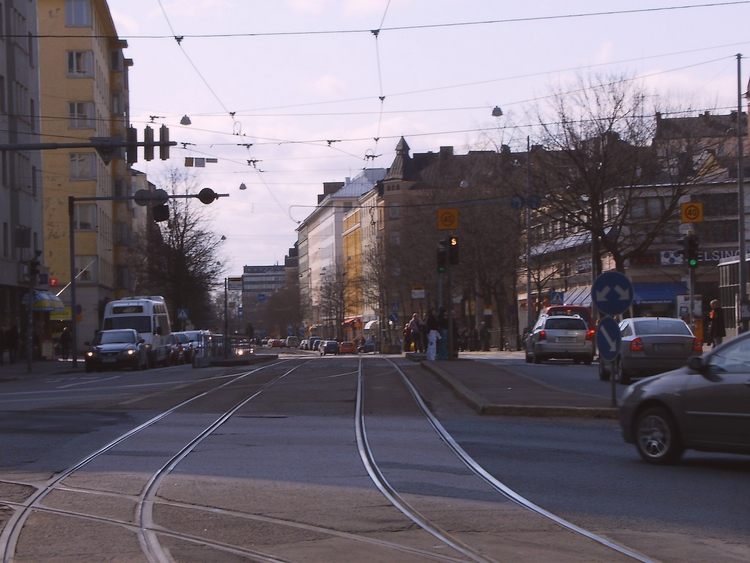
Helsinginkatu viewed to the west from the Sörnäinen curve in April 2008.

There had been plans for an avenue on the site of the current Helsinginkatu street since 1887. At the time there was a moist ditch at the site of the street, which was used as a farming ground. In 1902 a zoning plan was made, according to which Helsinginkatu was constructed. The lots along the street were measured for large rental houses, the most part of the lots on the boulevard part were sold in the 1920s and built at a fast pace. The Danish bare-surfaced red brick architecture served as a model. Rental apartments were small and business premises with display windows were built on the ground floor. It took until the 1970s for trees to be planted. The apartment blocks on Helsinginkatu have been largely renovated in the 2000s.

Until 1969 Helsinginkatu only stretched with its current name from Hämeentie to the railway underpass. Its current ending part was part of Eläintarhantie, which ran from the northwestern corner of the Hakaniemi market square to Mannerheimintie and went over the railway on a bridge for about half a kilometre south from the Helsinginkatu underpass. Between the northeastern shore of Töölönlahti and the railway Eläintarhantie made a 90-degree turn so that its ending part was a direct continuation of Helsinginkatu. When additional tracks were built for the railway, the Eläintarhantie bridge over the railway was dismantled, and the name was left only for the part of the street east of the railway in Kallio. The central part of Eläintarhantie from the dismantled bridge to the end of Helsinginkatu was renamed Linnunlauluntie after the Linnunlaulu villas around it, and the rest of the street was renamed Helsinginkatu after the original street.

== Profile ==
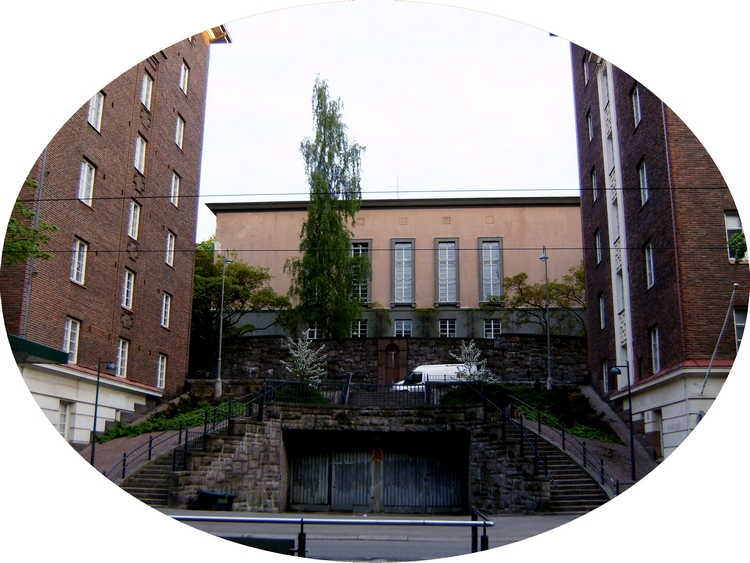
The Aadolfinrinne stairs from Helsinginkatu to Torkkelinmäki. In the background is the former university building Franzénia.

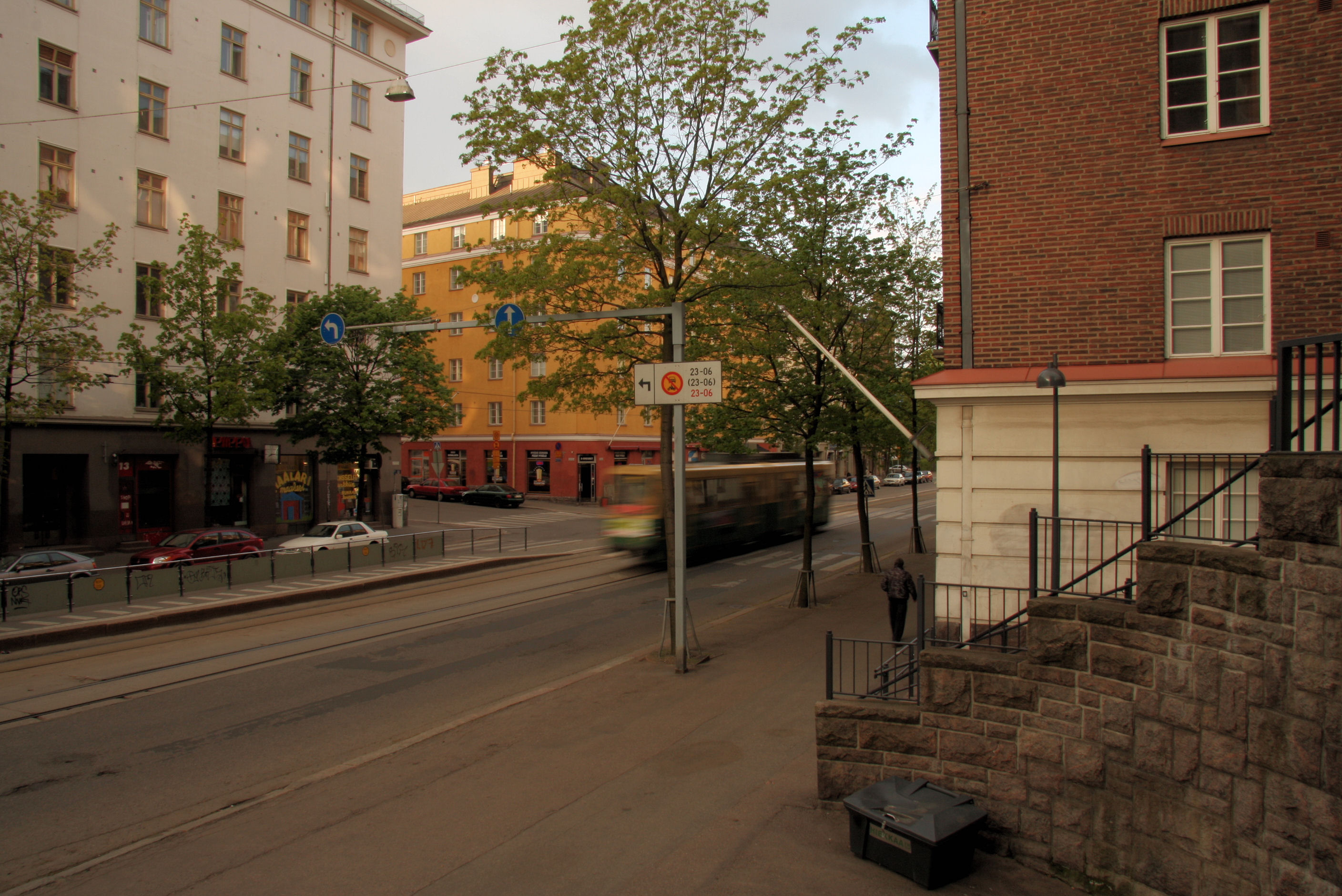
A tram passes the intersection of Helsinginkatu and Kustaankatu.

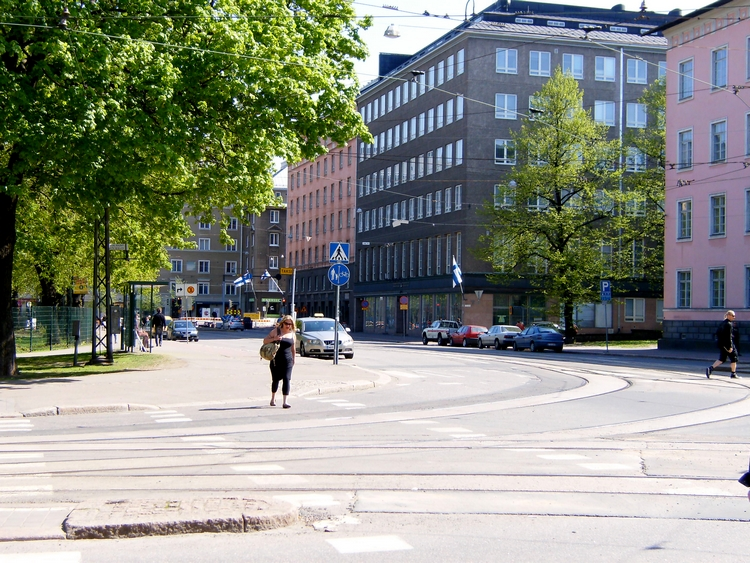
A view to the east from the intersection with Läntinen Brahenkatu in May 2008.

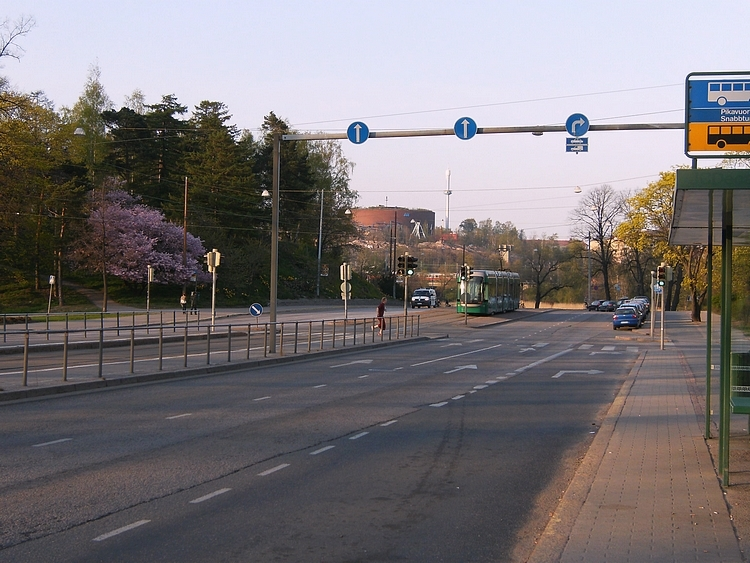
A view of Helsinginkatu to the east from the Finnish National Opera on a spring evening.

=== Avenue from Sörnäinen curve to Kaarlenkatu intersection ===
Going by the house numbering, Helsinginkatu begins at Hämeentie from the Sörnäinen curve, near the Sörnäinen metro station, and continues west-southwest to Mannerheimintie. Odd house numbers are on the northern edge of Helsinginkatu. The eastern half-kilometre-long part of the street is a long avenue or boulevard. At the start of the street is the triangular north-facing Vaasanpuistikko square, colloquially named "Piritori" ("Amphetamine Square"). Slightly west of Vaasanpuistikko to the south of the street is the semicircular Harjutori square. To the west of the square, also to the south of the street, is the Aadolfinrinne square with its two curved stairways, which lead up to Aadolfinkatu onto the Torkkelinmäki neighbourhood in front of the former main building of the University of Tampere (formerly located in Helsinki), Franzénia, which currently hosts a kindergarten. The intersection between Fleminginkatu and Helsinginkatu has traffic lights, and its northwestern edge opens into a small concrete-paved square. The Helsinki tram line 9 runs on the part between Fleminginkatu and Kaarlenkatu. The avenue part ends at the intersection with Kaarlenkatu. There is a small asphalt-paved square at the intersection, with many pubs around it, the most famous of which being restaurant Roskapankki.

=== Between Kaarlenkatu and Sturenkatu ===
There is active tram traffic on the short part between Kaarlenkatu and Läntinen Brahenkatu, because it is trafficked by the lines 1, 3 and 8. Here on the northern edge of the street is the Brahenkenttä sports field. The four-storey pink building of the Helsinki workers' institute is located next to the sports field. Between the Brahenkatu T intersection and the Kirstinkatu intersection is the Helsinki Sports House, to the west of which there are no buildings on the northern edge of Helsinginkatu. Immediately to the west of the Kirstinkatu intersection on both sides of Helsinginkatu are the Josafat cliffs and the Tauno Palo park opposite each other. To the west of them the Wallininkatu bridge leads over Helsinginkatu. The street Kolmas linja leads to the southeast from the same intersection. Car traffic coming from Sturenkatu can only continue west along Helsinginkatu. The tram lines 1 and 8 travel normally on Helsinginkatu between Sörnäinen and Mannerheimintie.

=== Between the Sturenkatu and the Mannerheimintie intersections ===
To the west of the Sturenkatu intersection, south of Helsinginkatu is located the Helsinki Deaconess Institute building complex. To the north of the street are cliffs belonging to Alppipuisto, on top of which is the Linnanmäki amusement park. The street widens to 3+2 lanes, with tram tracks on their own elevated lane between the car traffic lanes. Helsinginkatu goes underneath the railway track to the west of the Deaconess Institute and continues along the northern and northwestern shore of Töölönlahti. The Eläintarha park, whose Helsinki Winter Garden is visible to Helsinginkatu, is located to the north of the street. To the west of Töölönlahti the street curves and ends on Mannerheimintie. To the south of the street are located the restaurant Töölönranta and the Helsinki Opera House, opposite which is a square stretching to the Helsinki Olympic Stadium. Between the square and Mannerheimintie is the Töölö Sports Hall. Helsinginkatu ends at Mannerheimintie, with the physical street continuing to the west as Runeberginkatu.

There are traffic lights on Helsinginkatu at the following intersections: Hämeentie, Fleminginkatu, Kaarlenkatu, Sturenkatu, Vauhtitie, Mäntymäentie, Oopperankuja and Mannerheimintie. Additionally there is one set of pedestrian traffic lights at the Sörnäinen metro station.

== Light traffic ==
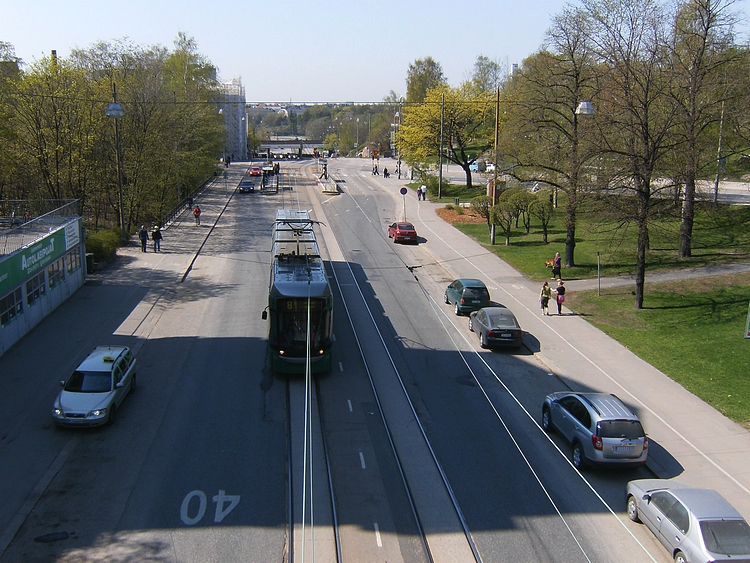
A view of Helsinginkatu from the Wallininkatu bridge. Sturenkatu in the background on the right.

There are asphalt-paved sidewalks on the boulevard part of Helsinginkatu. To the west from the intersection between Helsinginkatu and Kaarlenkatu the outer lane of the sidewalk on both sides has been separated as a bicycle lane, which is paved up to the Kirstinkatu intersection with red asphalt. The pedestrian lane is separated from the bicycle lane with stones or with a white line. Near the railway bridge there is a light traffic bridge over Helsinginkatu from the city centre to Pasila, which is connected to the Helsinginkatu sidewalks with two ramps and two stairways. To the west of the railway bridge the northern sidewalk of Helsinginkatu separates into its own light traffic lane, which reconnects to the street to the west of the Winter Garden. The southern sidewalk of Helsinginkatu connects to the avenue going around Töölönlahti immediately to the west of the railway track. At Töölönlahti, the bicycle lane is paved with red asphalt. At Mäntymäki, the Töölönlahti light traffic lane and the southern sidewalk of Helsinginkatu intersect each other.

== Buildings from east to west ==
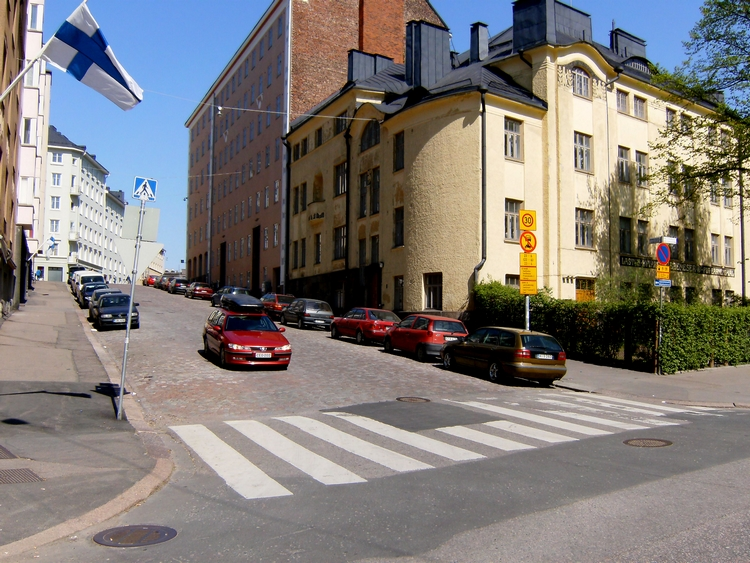
A view to Harjukatu. On the right is the protected Ebeneser foundation building.

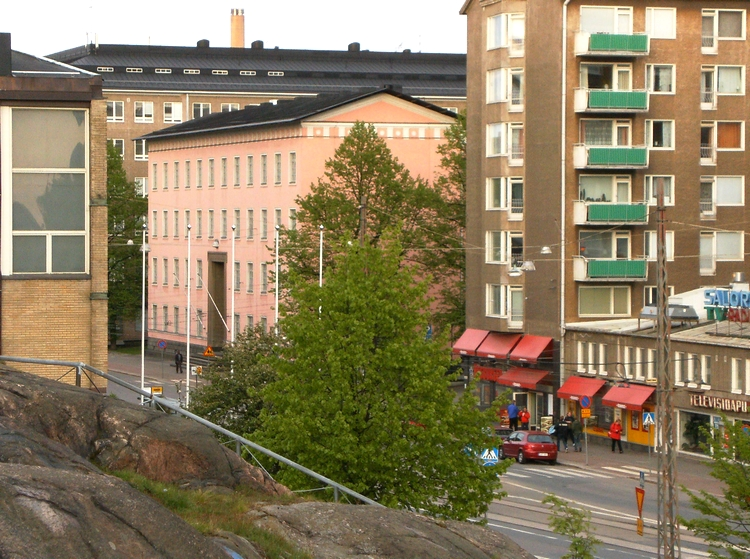
The pink house of the Helsinki workers' institute on a spring evening. On the left is a corner of the Helsinki Sports House.

- Ebeneser foundation building, built in 1908, protected, Helsinginkatu 3-5.
- Main building of the Helsinki workers' institute and central school, neo-classical building, architects Gunnar Taucher and Väinö Määttä, built in 1927, Helsinginkatu 26.
- Helsinki Sports House, built in 1961, Helsinginkatu 26, the yellow brick house also houses the Ryhmäteatteri theatre.
- Buildings of the Helsinki Deaconess Institute, yellow building on Helsinginkatu built in 1912, Helsinginkatu 50 (Kolmas linja 40, Alppikatu 2)
- Restaurant Töölönranta, architects Eero Hyvämäki, Jukka Karhunen and Risto Parkkinen, pavilion-style building, built in 1996, Helsinginkatu 56.
- Finnish National Opera and Ballet, architects Eero Hyvämäki, Jukka Karhunen and Risto Parkkinen, built from 1986 to 1993 in place of the Töölö sugar factory, Helsinginkatu 58.

== Sources ==
- Työväenperinne.fi
- Lib.hel.fi
- Ebeneser.fi
- Urheiluhallit.fi
- Hel2.fi
- WCM_GLOBAL_CONTEXT=/fi/Helsingin+kaupungin+liikennelaitos/ Hel.fi/HKL
