= Sörnäinen curve =

Area of Helsinki, Finland

Coordinates: 60°11.26′N 24°57.71′E

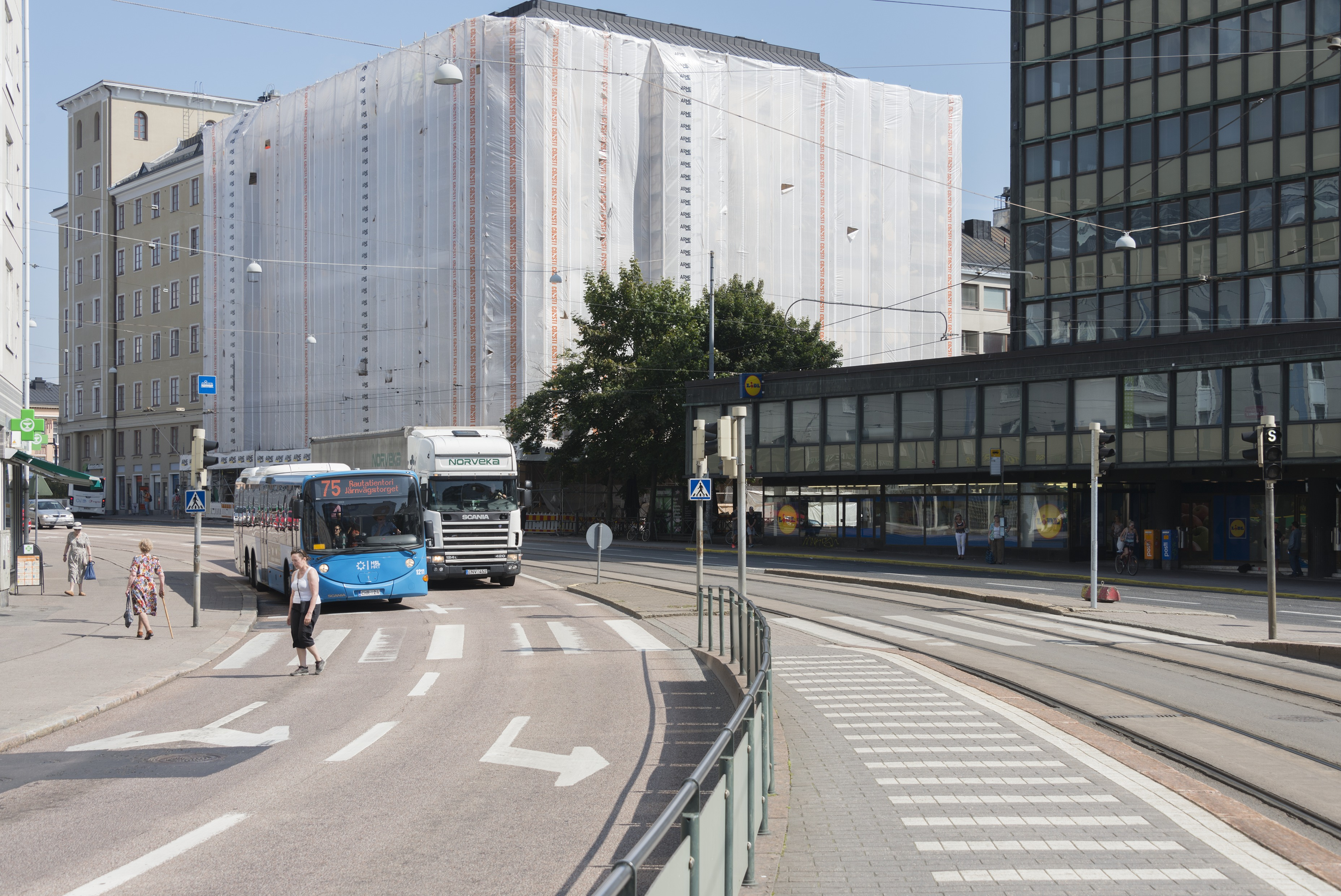
The Sörnäinen curve, viewed north along Hämeentie.

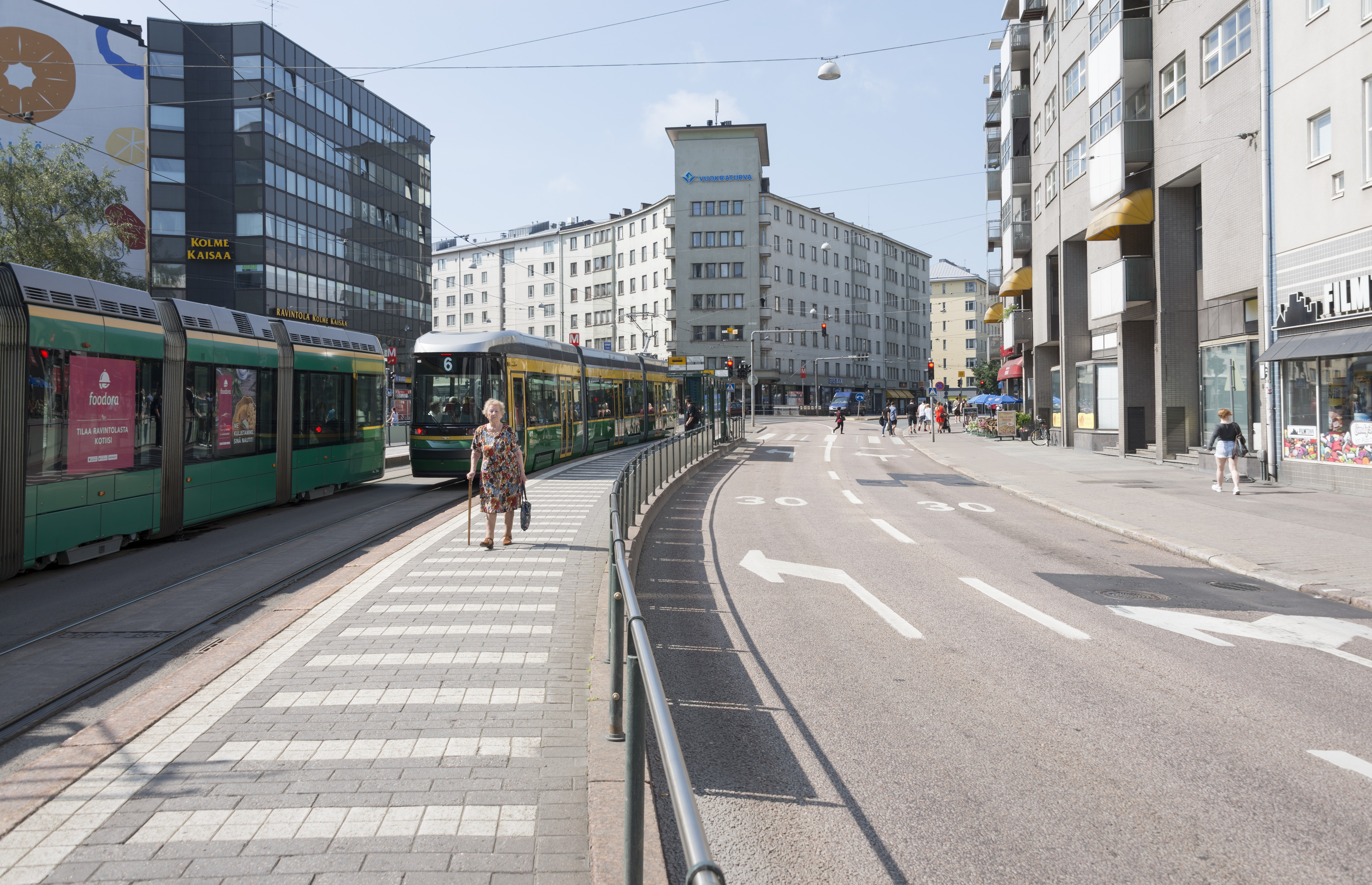
The Sörnäinen curve, viewed south. Sörnäinen is to the left, Kallio and Harju straight ahead.

The Sörnäinen curve (Finnish: Sörnäisten kurvi, Swedish: Sörnäskurvan), also known as Sörkän kurvi or just Kurvi, is an area in the eastern part of the Helsinki city proper in Finland, at the intersection point of the neighbourhoods of Sörnäinen, Kallio and Alppiharju. The area is located around the point where the street Hämeentie curves to the right going north and the street Helsinginkatu branches off it to the west. The curve area covers the whole area on the intersection of Helsinginkatu and Hämeentie. The curve serves as a hub for many public transport connections, including the Sörnäinen metro station. One of the former landmarks of the curve was the building of the insurance company Kansa and the light tower located on top of it.

After the war, Finnish magazines perpetuated the traditionally bad reputation of the area around the curve, Vaasankatu and Linjat. At the time, the restless reputation of the curve mostly resulted from the thousands of children and youth of the residential area taking control of the streets unaware of their own "dangerousness". The homeless shelters and dormitories in the area also contributed to the restlessness. Apu magazine published provocative reports of the Sörkka underworld in the 1950s, but this fell out of use in the 1960s, and only the moonshine smugglers on Vaasankatu attracted media attention. "The restless Helsinki" began to concentrate more around the Helsinki central railway station. The Vaasanpuistikko square near the curve has had a restless reputation up to the 2010s. It has been called Piritori ("Amphetamine Square") in colloquial speech.

Slightly to the south, around the Itäinen Viertotie street (now known as Hämeentie), a group of working-class quarters called Suruttomien villat ("The villas of the carefree"), which were mostly dismantled in the early 1930s. On the second day of the Winter War, five explosion bombs hit the Vaasanpuistikko square, causing great fragment and window damage to the nearby houses.

In 1937, a large building called Perämiehen talo after the restaurant located in it was built on the corner of Hämeentie and Helsinginkatu. Elanto bought the house in the 1950s, sold off the apartments as shares and renamed the house as Hämeentähti. Later the house was called the Kurvi house.

== Sources ==
- Nenonen, Kaija—Toppari, Kirsi: Herrasväen ja työläisten kaupunki. Helsingin vanhoja kortteleita 2, p. 258 and 270-273. Helsingin Sanomat, 1983. ISBN 951-9135-03-0.
