= Tilkka =

Former military hospital in Helsinki, Finland

Coordinates: 60°11′59″N 024°53′55″E

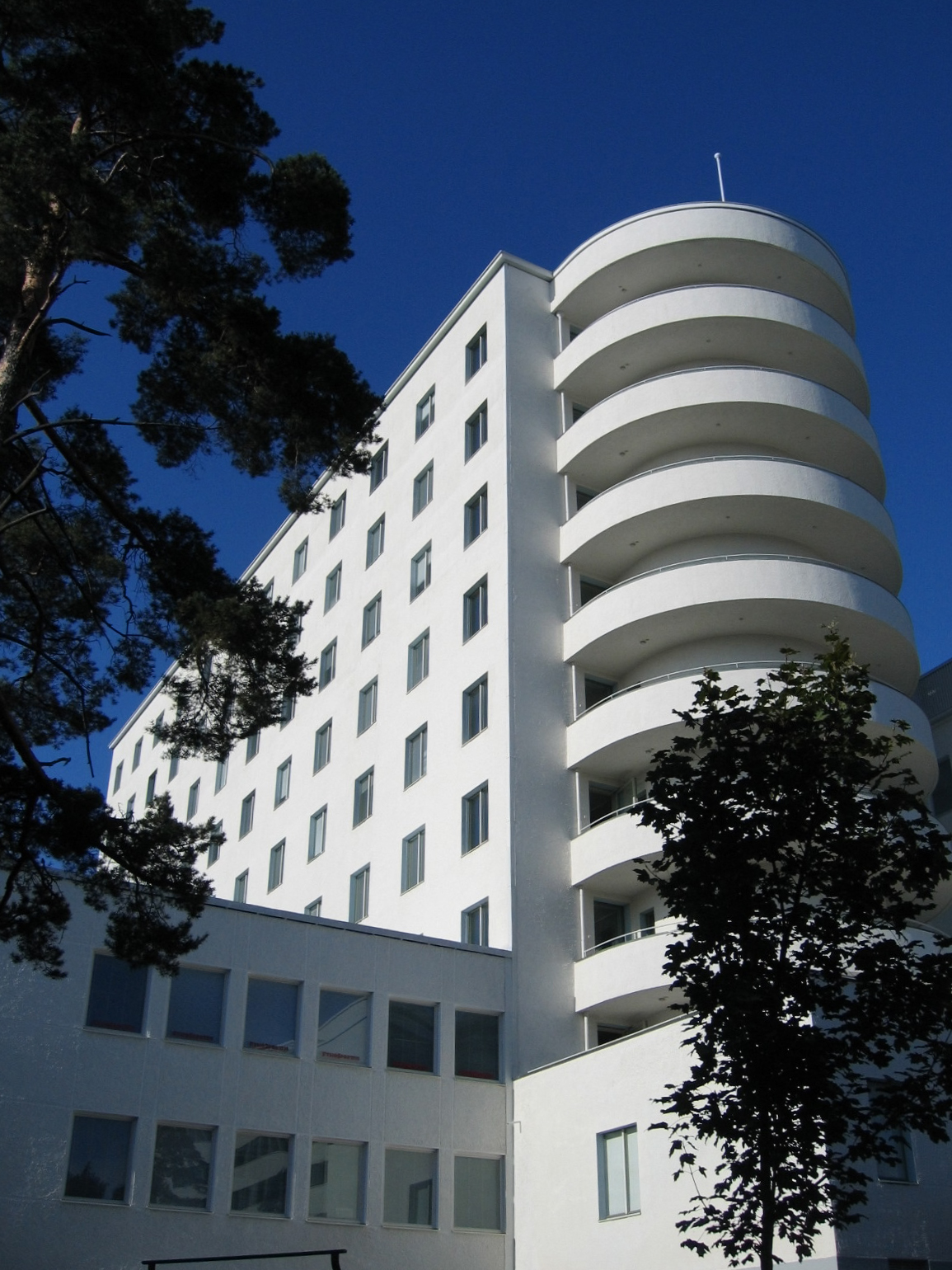
Tilkka in September 2009. The semi-circular balconies are the building's hallmark.

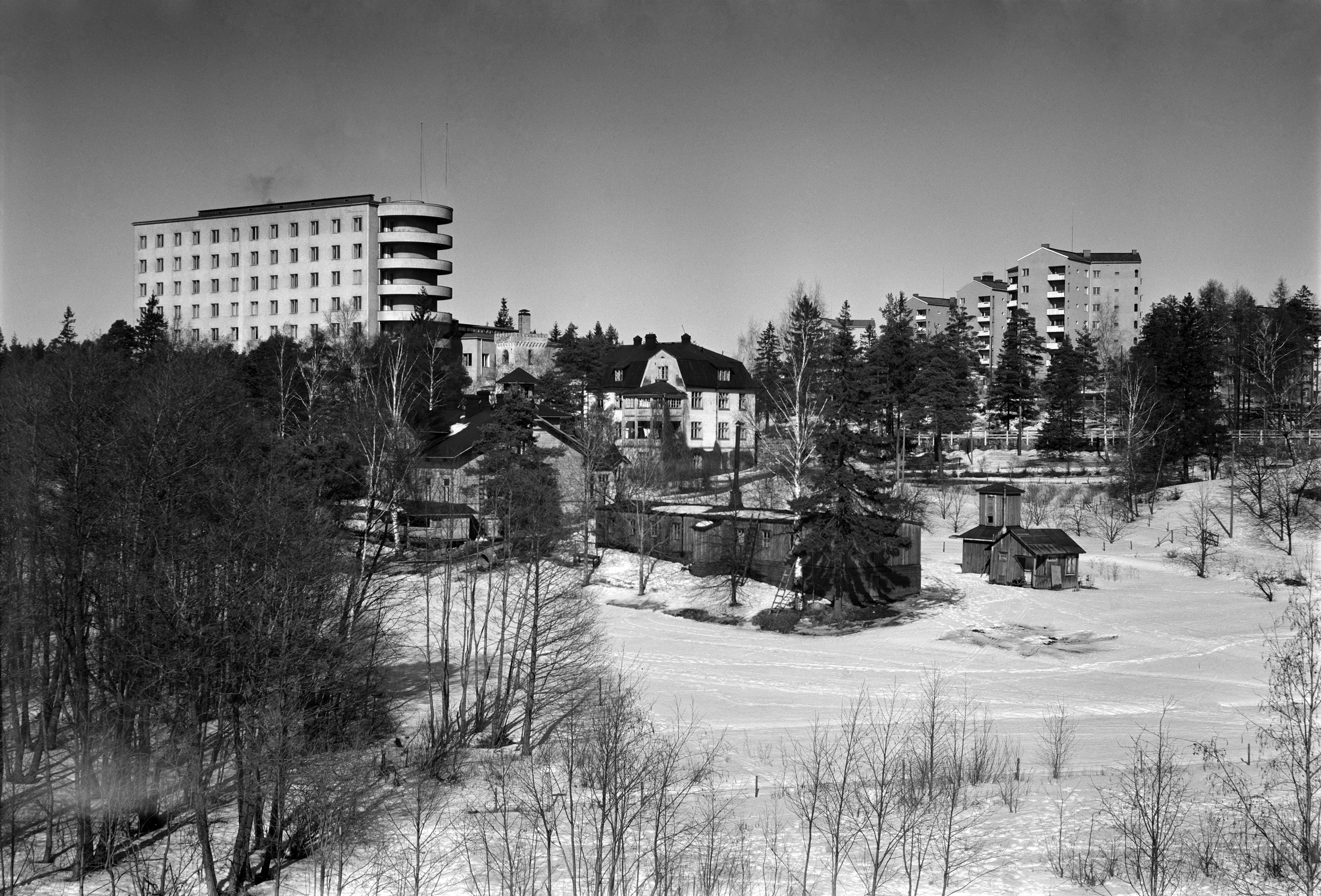
Tilkka in 1957

Tilkka Hospital (Finnish: Tilkan sairaala, Swedish: Tilkka sjukhus; often referred to simply as Tilkka) is a former military hospital in Helsinki, Finland. It is located at Mannerheimintie 164 in the Pikku Huopalahti district.

== Military hospital (1936–2005) ==
Tilkka military hospital was founded in 1918 and moved to Pikku Huopalahti in 1936 when the new nine-storey Functionalist building designed by architect Olavi Sortta was completed. The design drew inspiration from Alvar Aalto's Paimio Sanatorium as well as the architecture of Erich Mendelsohn.

The building's distinctive mark are the semi-circular balconies, facing south around the main stairway. Patient rooms were concentrated on the top seven floors, providing patients with light, ventilation and a scenic view. Service rooms were located across the central corridor.

Tilkka was expanded in the 1960s with a five-storey enlargement, an office wing and another low wing that housed for instance a military pharmacy. The expansion was also designed by Sortta and the enlargement followed the space division of the original 1930s building.

== After military use (2005–) ==
The military hospital operated until 2005 when the Finnish Defence Forces vacated the building following an organizational transformation that outsourced the military's special health care.

The State of Finland sold the building to pension insurance company Etera for 8.8 million euros in October 2006 after which it was renovated into an elderly nursing home. The nursing home is operated by nursing service provider Esperi Care and houses 150 residents.

== Heritage status ==
The National Board of Antiquities has listed Tilkka as a nationally significant built cultural heritage site.

Docomomo has selected the building as a significant example of modern architecture in Finland.

The building is protected by a 2002 zoning ordinance and cannot be torn down or altered in a way that damages its cultural historical value.
