= Laakso =

Neighbourhood of Helsinki, Finland

Coordinates: 60°11′30″N 24°55′00″E

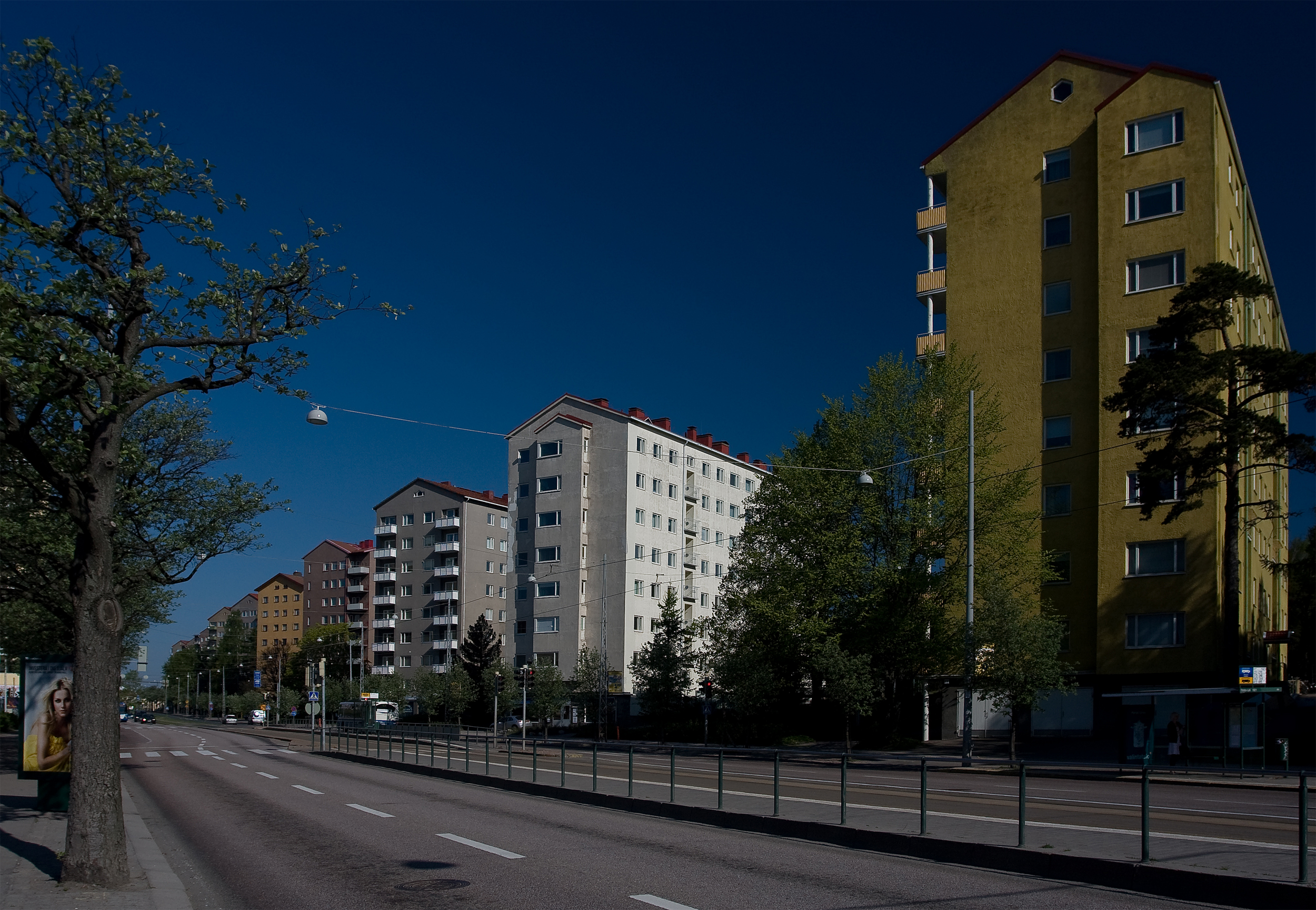
Olympic village buildings by Mannerheimintie.

Laakso (Swedish: Dal) is a neighbourhood in Helsinki, Finland. Its borders are defined by the streets of Mannerheimintie and Nordenskiöldinkatu and the Helsinki Central Park. The neighbourhood is bordered by Töölö in the south, Meilahti in the southwest, Ruskeasuo in the north and Länsi-Pasila in the east.

The neighbourhood has an area of 0.74 km^{2}, a population of 1781 and 1583 jobs (December 31, 2003). Laakso is neighbourhood #18 in the official neighbourhood numbering of Helsinki, and belongs to the district of Reijola.

The population in Laakso is mainly concentrated in multiple-floor apartment buildings on Mannerheimintie. The neighbourhood also includes a hospital, a riding field, a traffic playground, and a large part of the southern Central Park.

For the 1952 Summer Olympics, the neighborhood hosted the Eventing equestrian riding competitions.
