= Vaasanpuistikko =

Square in Helsinki, Finland

Coordinates: 60°11′16″N 24°57′38″E

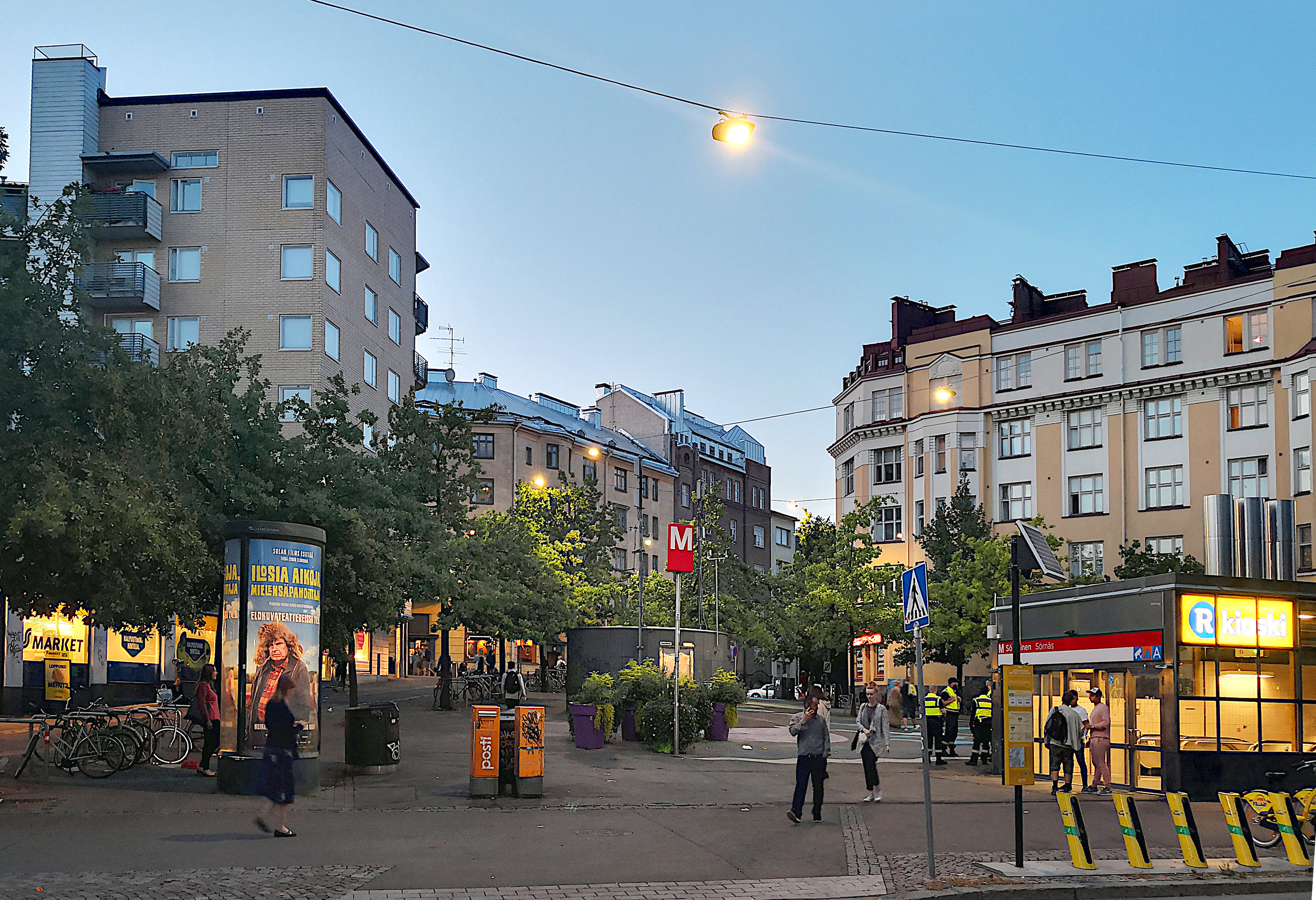
Vaasanpuistikko in 2018. Entrance to the Sörnäinen metro station on the right.

Vaasanpuistikko (Swedish: Vasaskvären, unofficial name Vaasanaukio), meaning "Vaasa park", is an area in Helsinki, Finland, surrounded by the streets of Helsinginkatu, Vaasanpolku and Pengerpolku around the western entrance to the Sörnäinen metro station, near the so-called Sörnäinen curve. Even though Vaasanpuistikko is located in the neighbourhood of Alppiharju, it is commonly thought of as a part of Kallio. Vaasanpuistikko is connected with Vaasankatu.

Around Vaasanpuistikko are located the Sörnäinen metro station, a pawn shop of Helsingin Pantti, a self-defense school, a gym, a driving school and an S-market shop. There are numerous bars, pizzerias and other restaurants located nearby.

Helsinki city council member Kimmo Helistö made a proposal in 2007 to rename the square as "Arto Mellerin aukio" after the poet Arto Melleri, but the proposal was not supported.

Vaasanpuistikko is sometimes humorously referred to with the nicknames "Piritori" ("Amphetamine square") and "Ikuisen vapun aukio" ("Square of the eternal Walpurgis Night").

A renovation of the area that cost 1.2 million euros was completed in 2024.
