= Eläintarha =

Park in Helsinki, Finland

Coordinates: 60°11′25″N 24°55′47″E

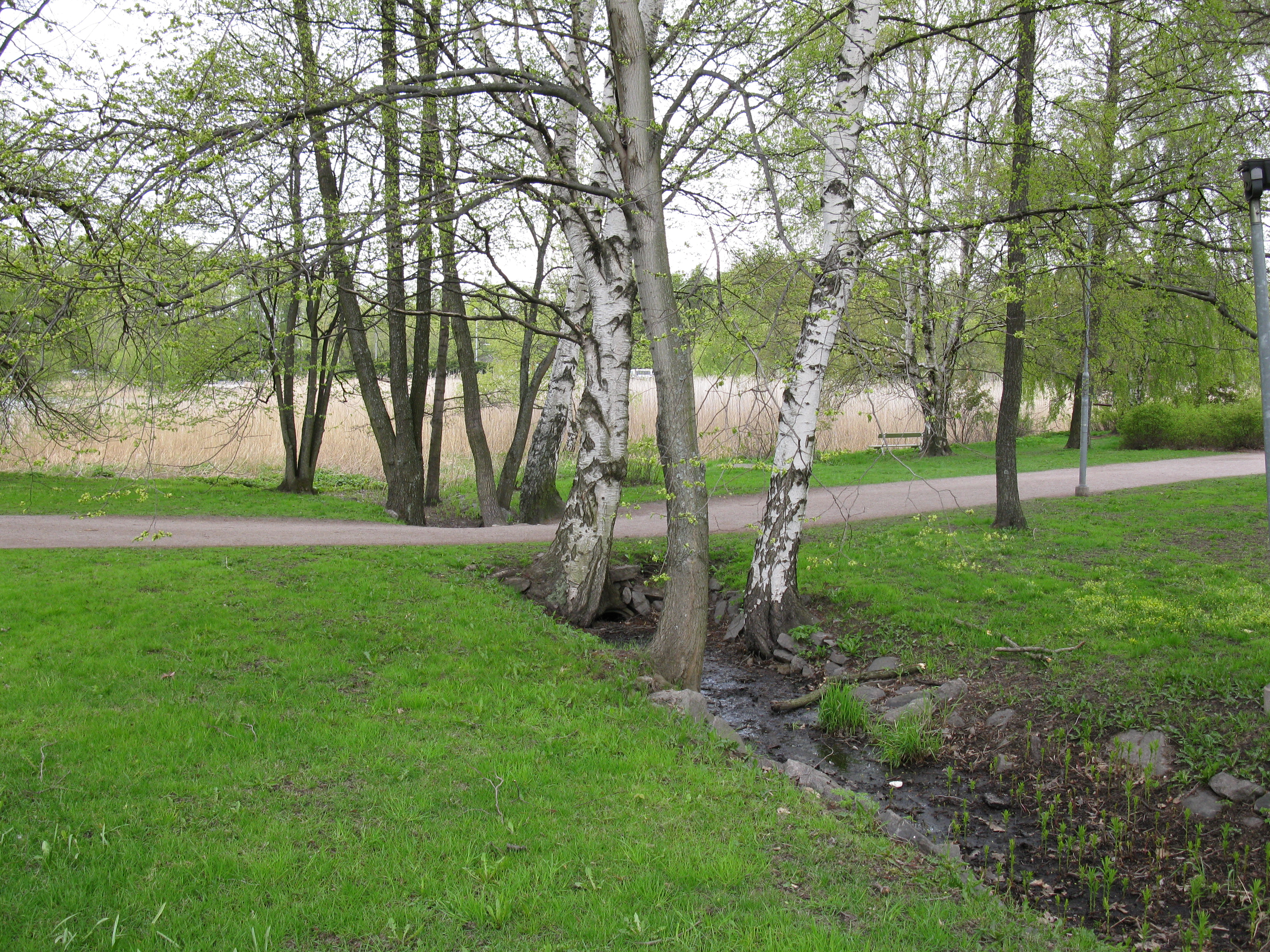

Eläintarha (Swedish: Djurgården) is a large park in central Helsinki, Finland.

The park serves as a divisor between the districts of Töölö to the west, and Hakaniemi and Kallio to the east. The southern half of the park includes two bays of the Baltic Sea: Töölönlahti to the west, and Eläintarhanlahti to the east. The railroad tracks running northwards from the Helsinki Central railway station run between these bays, effectively splitting the Eläintarha park in half.

At the north-western end of the park, near the district of Laakso, is the Eläintarha Stadium, or "Eltsu" in slang. From 1932 to 1963, the Eläintarha arena hosted annual motorbike and racing car races, known as Eläintarhanajot or "Eltsunajot", but these were later cancelled as too dangerous.

Contrary to the name, which literally translates to "animal garden", there has never been a zoo in Eläintarha. There are two theories for the misleading name. The more popular one is that Henrik Borgström, whose company rented the park area from the City of Helsinki in the middle of the 19th century, had announced plans to build a zoo there, and by the 1880s, the name Eläintarha had been established in advance, anticipating the zoo, which never materialised. The city of Helsinki took back the park from Borgström in 1877. Another theory is that the name is simply a translation from the Djurgården park in Stockholm, Sweden.

The real Helsinki zoo is located on the island of Korkeasaari.

The landscape of Töölönlahti in Eläintarha is portrayed in the famous painting The Wounded Angel by Finnish symbolist painter Hugo Simberg.

== Sources ==
- Yle question of the week: What is the history of Eläintarha's name?
- The Eläintarha park area at niksula.cs.hut.fi
- Leppänen, Marko: Maalaukseen astuminen - Haavoittunut enkeli Eläintarhassa Esoteerinen maantiede ja periferiaterapia. 16.4.2010. (Finnish)
