= Mannerheimintie =

Street in Helsinki, Finland

Coordinates: 60°10′08″N 024°56′24″E

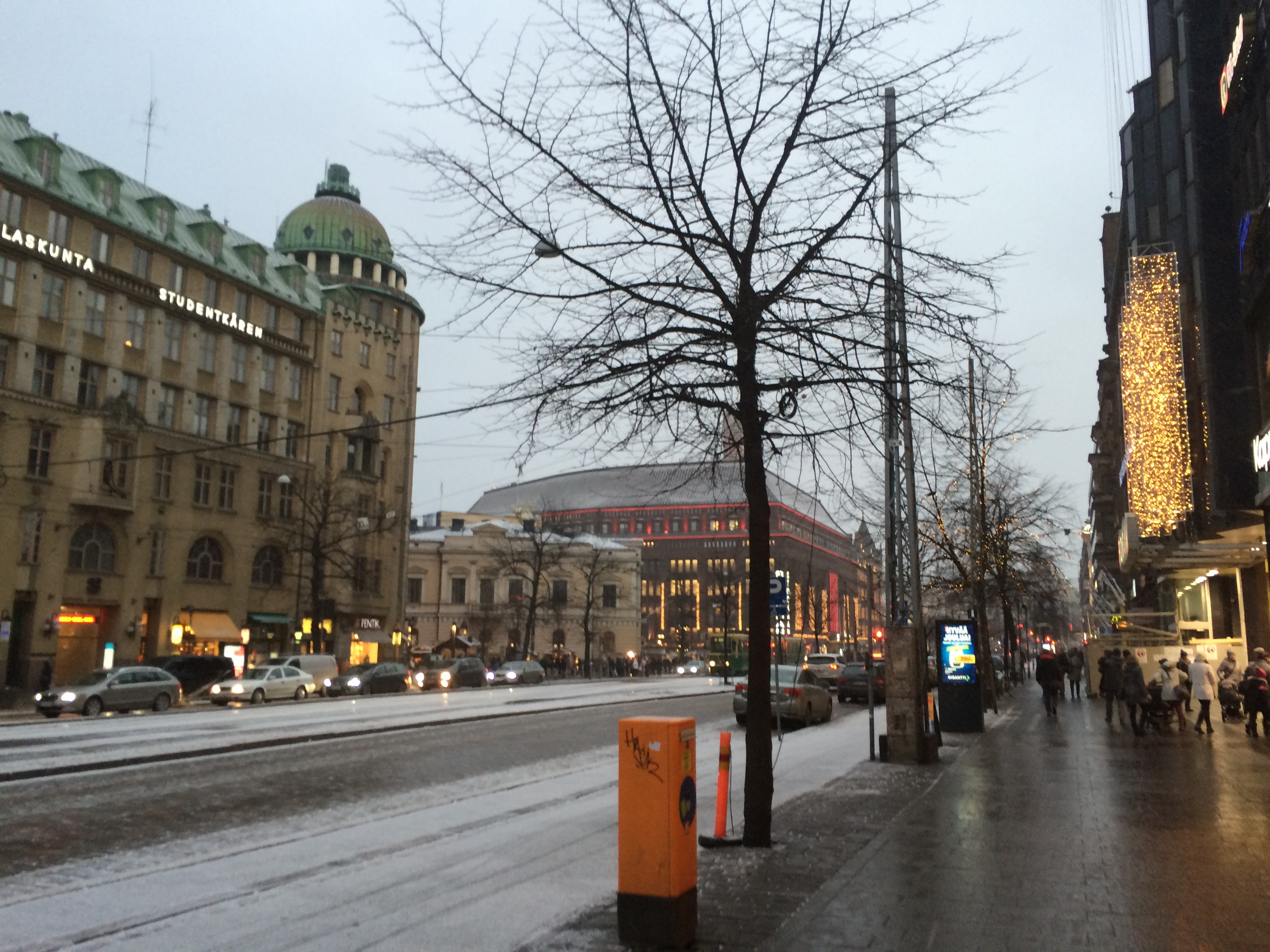
Mannerheimintie in the city centre

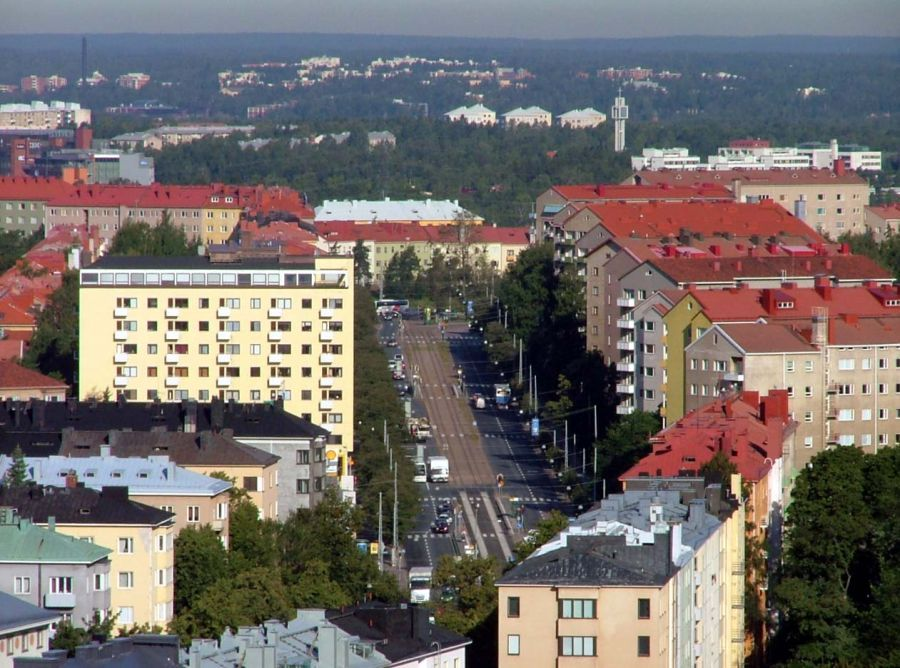
Mannerheimintie and apartment buildings of Meilahti (left) and Laakso (right), some 3–4 km (1.9–2.5 mi) north from Erottaja

Mannerheimintie (Swedish: Mannerheimvägen) (previously known as Henrikinkatu, Läntinen ja Itäinen Henrikinkatu, Läntinen ja Itäinen Heikinkatu, Turuntie, Läntinen viertotie, Heikinkatu), colloquially known as Mansku, named after the Finnish military leader and statesman Carl Gustaf Emil Mannerheim, is the main street and avenue of Helsinki, Finland. It also forms part of the European route E12 and a continuation of the Finnish national road 3.

The street was originally named Heikinkatu (Swedish: Henriksgatan), after Robert Henrik Rehbinder on the first part up to the current Kiasma Art museum and Turuntie after that, but was renamed after the Winter War. The change of name was also a reference to Mannerheim's victory parade along the road during the Finnish Civil War (1918), after German forces, allied with Mannerheim's Finnish forces, had retaken the city.

The street is 5.5 kilometres long and begins at Erottaja in the city centre, near the Swedish Theatre and continues in a northernly direction past the Stockmann department store. It then continues as a main thoroughfare past the districts of Kamppi, Töölö, Meilahti, Laakso and Ruskeasuo, until it finally merges into the busy Tampere Highway (E12), which leads outside the city towards Hämeenlinna and Tampere. (Geographically, the highway only ends in central Tampere, as a small street called Kalevan Puistotie.)

== History ==
What is now known as Mannerheimintie started as a country road in the 17th century, forming the westernmost of the two main routes leading to the city of Helsinki. The street led northwest from the city, through the districts of Haaga and Pitäjänmäki towards Espoo, where it joined the long King's Road between the cities of Turku and Vyborg. On maps the street was named either Landsvägen till Åbo ("country road to Turku") or Landsvägen till Esbo ("country road to Espoo"). Later, the name Turuntie entered common use. The easternmost road was the street Hämeentie leading northeast towards the district of Vanhakaupunki.

When Johan Albrecht Ehrenström made a new zoning plan for Helsinki which had been made into Finland's new capital in 1812, the city spread out over Turuntie to the areas of Kamppi and Punavuori. The start of Turuntie from Erottaja to the Turku barracks (to the site of the present-day Lasipalatsi) was made into a city street and was named Henrikinkatu (Swedish: Henriksgatan) after the minister-secretary of state Robert Henrik Rehbinder. In the 1830s Henrikinkatu was made into a wide two-part boulevard. The parts were named Itäinen Henrikinkatu and Läntinen Henrikinkatu (Swedish: Östra Henriksgatan and Västra Henriksgatan), and an esplanade with three rows of linden trees called Henrikin esplanadi, later known as Heikinpuisto (Swedish: Henriksesplanaden) was built between them. In 1928 the streets were renamed Itäinen Heikinkatu and Läntinen Heikinkatu in Finnish and the park was also renamed as Heikinpuisto (Henriksallén).

Slightly to the north of the Turku barracks Henrikin esplanadi changed into Turuntie which, true to its name, was the start of a country road leading to Turku. In the 1850s the start of Turuntie from the Turku barracks to the Töölö border crossing, as well the start of Hämeentie from the Pitkäsilta bridge to the present-day St. Paul's Church was paved with gravel and changed to significantly wider chaussees. At the same point Turuntie was renamed as Västra Chaussén or Läntinen Viertotie in Finnish, similarly Hämeentie became Östra Chaussén or Itäinen Viertotie in Finnish. In 1928 the names Turuntie and Hämeentie were returned into use.

Between World War I and World War II Henrikin esplanadi started becoming a blockade for the increasing car traffic. In 1935 the city decided to cut down the century-old lindens on the esplanade and connect the two Heikinkatu streets with each other. The trams, which previously had travelled among other traffic, now got their own lane in the middle of the new wide street in the place of the old linden-lined park. To replace the lost lindens, the city planted new rows of trees around the new lane. A long time later the tram lane in the middle of the street was also lined with trees. In 1942 Heikinkatu and the part of Turuntie in the city centre were connected and the new street was named Mannerheimintie in honour of the 75th birthday of Marshal of Finland Carl Gustaf Emil Mannerheim.

The first traffic lights in Helsinki were not built on Mannerheimintie but instead on Aleksanterinkatu in 1951, but Mannerheimintie did get the city's first public traffic controlled traffic lights (in TIlkanmäki in 1958) because of crossing tram traffic and the first bicycle traffic lights (in Tilkanmäki in 1981 with a special permit).

== Buildings ==
Many famous buildings are located on, or near, Mannerheimintie. These include the House of Parliament, the central offices of the Finnish Posti Group, the Finlandia Hall, the National Museum, the Helsinki Opera House, Hotel Marski, and Tilkka.

There are many landmark sculptures by Mannerheimintie. These include the Three Smiths Statue and the Statue of Mannerheim near Kiasma.

There are only two streets running across Mannerheimintie: Nordenskiöldinkatu overground, and Tilkanvierto below it as an underpass. There are many other streets connecting with Mannerheimintie, but all of them either end at Mannerheimintie or continue across it under a different name.

== See also ==
- Hakamäentie
- Tampere Highway
- Vihdintie
- Paasikiven–Kekkosentie
