= Ruskeasuo =

Neighbourhood of Helsinki, Finland

Coordinates: 60°12′N 24°54′E

Ruskeasuo on Helsinki map

Ruskeasuo (Brunakärr in Swedish, verbatim "Brown swamp") is a neighbourhood of Helsinki (Helsingfors in Swedish), about 3 kilometres north of the city center.

With a population of 2670 (year 2005), Ruskeasuo is a rather quiet residential area. Buildings by Mannerheimintie are typically 6-8 floors high from 1950s. Between Mannerheimintie and Central Park, low-rise buildings are dominant.

The equestrian dressage and eventing competitions for the 1952 Summer Olympics took place at their sports hall.
