= Central Park (Helsinki) =

Park in Helsinki, Finland

Coordinates: 60°13′23″N 024°55′09″E

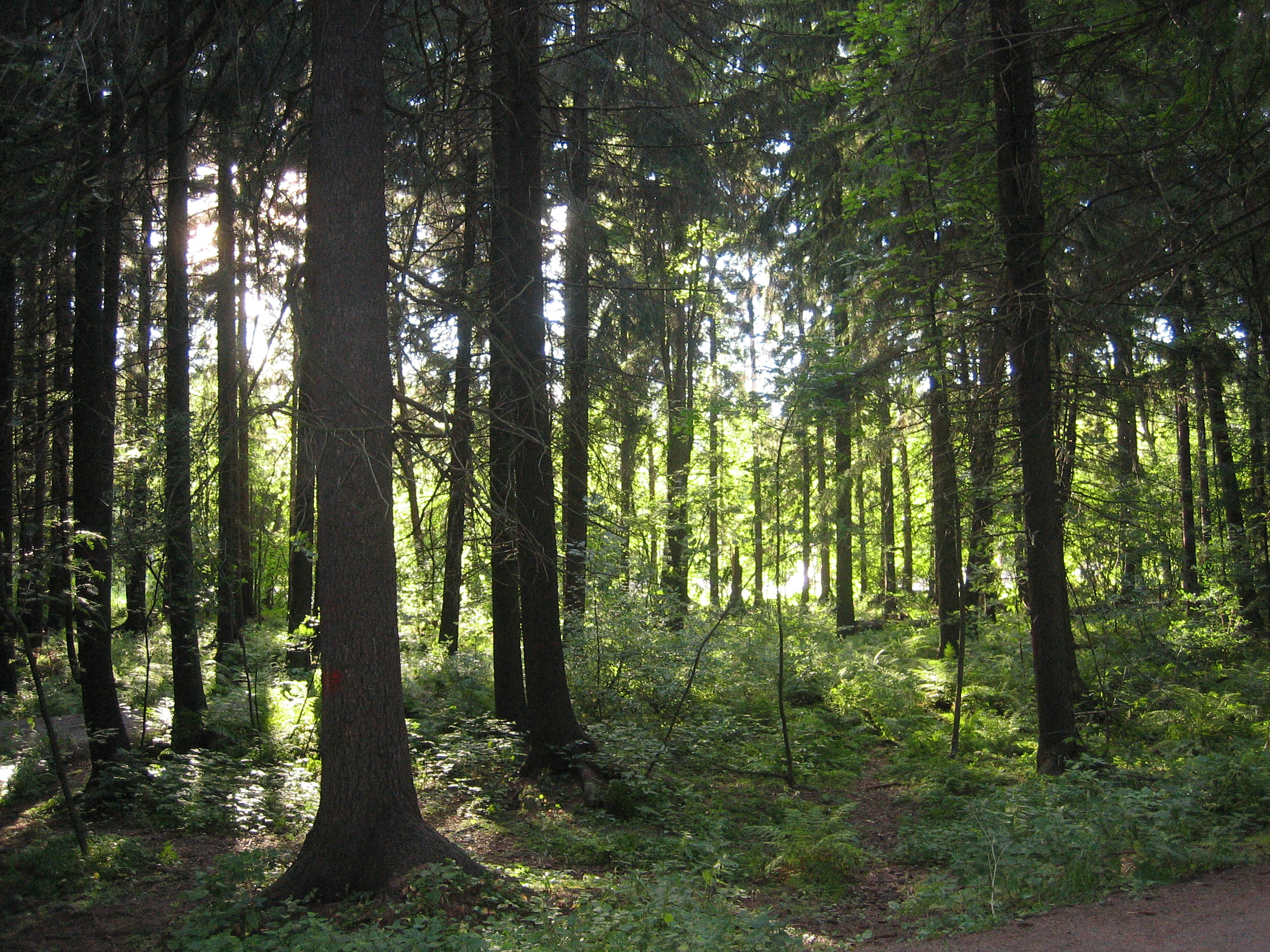
Summer in Keskuspuisto.

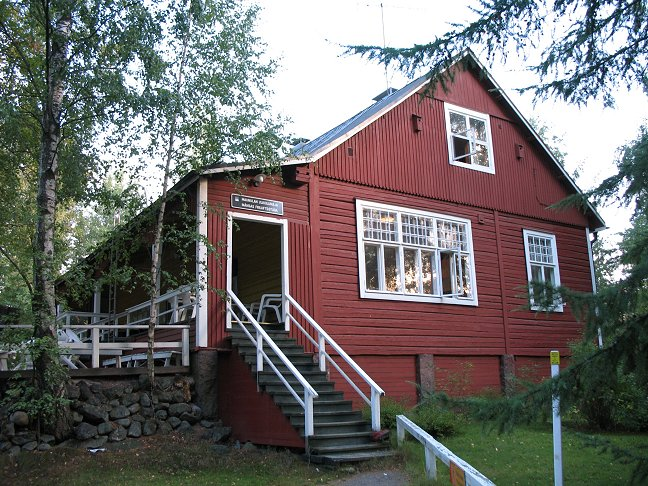
Maunulan maja, in the middle part of the park, has a café and a sauna.

Central Park (Finnish: Helsingin keskuspuisto, Swedish: Helsingfors centralpark) is a park in Helsinki, Finland. It has an area of 10 square kilometres (4 sq mi). The park stretches 10 kilometres (6 mi) from Töölönlahti Bay in the south to the border of Helsinki and Vantaa in the north.

The park is not a gardened one but instead consists mostly of lightly managed woodland crisscrossed by gravel paths.

The Paloheinä forest, a northern extension of the park, is Helsinki's main center for outdoor activities.

== History ==
Architect Bertel Jung first proposed the idea of a central park in Helsinki in 1911. However, the initial proposal only covered what is now the southernmost part of the park, along with areas that are currently not part of Central Park, such as those in Kaisaniemi.

A master plan for Central Park was ratified in 1978. A general plan for Helsinki, from 2002, kept it in force.
