= Subdivisions of Helsinki =

The city of Helsinki, the capital of Finland, can be divided into various sorts of subdivisions. Helsinki is divided into three major areas: Helsinki Downtown (Finnish: Helsingin kantakaupunki, Swedish: Helsingfors innerstad), North Helsinki (Finnish: Pohjois-Helsinki, Swedish: Norra Helsingfors) and East Helsinki (Finnish: Itä-Helsinki, Swedish: Östra Helsingfors). The subdivisions include boroughs, districts, major districts and postal code areas. The plethora of different official ways to divide the city is a source of some confusion to the inhabitants, as different kinds of subdivisions often share similar or identical names.

== Boroughs ==
Helsinki consists of 60 boroughs (Finnish kaupunginosa; Swedish stadsdel).

Helsinki consists of 60 boroughs (kaupunginosa in Finnish; stadsdel in Swedish). The division into boroughs is the official division created by the city council and used for city planning and other similar purposes. Most of the boroughs have existed since the 19th century as numbered parts of the city, and official names were assigned to them in 1959. Five boroughs (numbers 55 – 59) were annexed on 1 January 2009.

Today, each borough is identified by both a two-digit number between 01 and 59 and an official name in both Finnish and Swedish (in some cases they may be identical). In addition, there is an unnumbered borough called Aluemeri that consists essentially only of outer coastal water that does not reach to the coast. Boroughs are further divided into quarters (osa-alue) and sectors (pienalue), numbered with three and four digits respectively. Sectors divide further into individual blocks and properties.

=== List of Helsinki boroughs ===
This is listed by Finnish names first and the Swedish names in brackets. This is due to the bilinguality of Finland and Helsinki.

- 01 Kruununhaka (Kronohagen)
- 02 Kluuvi (Gloet)
- 03 Kaartinkaupunki (Gardestaden)
- 04 Kamppi (Kampen)
- 05 Punavuori (Rödbergen)
- 06 Eira
- 07 Ullanlinna (Ulrikasborg)
- 08 Katajanokka (Skatudden)
- 09 Kaivopuisto (Brunnsparken)
- 10 Sörnäinen (Sörnäs)
  - 102 Kalasatama (Fiskehamnen)
- 11 Kallio (Berghäll)
  - 111 Siltasaari (Broholmen)
  - 112 Linjat (Linjerna)
  - 113 Torkkelinmäki (Torkelsbacken)
- 12 Alppiharju (Åshöjden)
  - 121 Harju (Ås)
  - 122 Alppila (Alphyddan)
- 13 Etu-Töölö (Främre Tölö)
- 14 Taka-Töölö (Bortre Tölö)
- 15 Meilahti (Mejlans)
- 16 Ruskeasuo (Brunakärr)
  - 161 Pikku Huopalahti (Lillhoplax)^{1}
- 17 Pasila (Böle)
  - 171 Länsi-Pasila (Västra Böle)
  - 172 Pohjois-Pasila (Norra Böle)
  - 173 Itä-Pasila (Östra Böle)
  - 174 Keski-Pasila (Mellersta Böle)
- 18 Laakso (Dal)
- 19 Mustikkamaa-Korkeasaari (Blåbärslandet-Högholmen)
- 20 Länsisatama (Västra hamnen)
  - 201 Ruoholahti (Gräsviken)
  - 202 Lapinlahti (Lappviken)
  - 203 Jätkäsaari (Busholmen)
  - 204 Hernesaari (Ärtholmen)
- 21 Hermanni (Hermanstaden)
- 22 Vallila (Vallgård)
- 23 Toukola (Majstad)
  - 231 Toukola (Majstad)
  - 232 Arabianranta (Arabiastranden)
- 24 Kumpula (Gumtäkt)
- 25 Käpylä (Kottby)
- 26 Koskela (Forsby)
- 27 Vanhakaupunki (Gammelstaden)
- 28 Oulunkylä (Åggelby)
  - 281 Pirkkola (Britas)
  - 282 Maunula (Månsas)
  - 283 Metsälä (Krämertskog)
  - 284 Patola (Dammen)
  - 285 Veräjämäki (Grindbacka)
  - 286 Maunulanpuisto (Månsasparken)
  - 287 Veräjälaakso (Grinddal)
- 29 Haaga (Haga)
  - 291 Etelä-Haaga (Södra Haga)
  - 292 Kivihaka (Stenhagen)
  - 293 Pohjois-Haaga (Norra Haga)
  - 294 Lassila (Lassas)
- 30 Munkkiniemi (Munksnäs)
  - 301 Vanha Munkkiniemi (Gamla Munksnäs)
  - 302 Kuusisaari (Granö)
  - 303 Lehtisaari (Lövö)
  - 304 Munkkivuori (Munkshöjden)
  - 305 Niemenmäki (Näshöjden)
  - 306 Talinranta (Talistranden)
- 31 Lauttasaari (Drumsö)
- 32 Konala (Kånala)
- 33 Kaarela (Kårböle)
  - 331 Kannelmäki (Gamlas)
  - 332 Maununneva (Magnuskärr)
  - 333 Malminkartano (Malmgård)
  - 334 Hakuninmaa (Håkansåker)
  - 335 Kuninkaantammi (Kungseken)
- 34 Pakila (Baggböle)
  - 341 Länsi-Pakila (Västra Baggböle)
  - 342 Itä-Pakila (Östra Baggböle)
- 35 Tuomarinkylä (Domarby)
  - 351 Paloheinä (Svedängen)
  - 352 Torpparinmäki (Torparbacken)
  - 353 Tuomarinkartano (Domargård)
  - 354 Haltiala (Tomtbacka)
- 36 Viikki (Vik)
  - 361 Viikinranta (Viksstranden)
  - 362 Latokartano (Ladugården)
  - 363 Viikin tiedepuisto (Viks forskarpark)
  - 364 Viikinmäki (Viksbacka)
- 37 Pukinmäki (Bocksbacka)
- 38 Malmi (Malm)
  - 381 Ylä-Malmi (Övre Malm)
  - 382 Ala-Malmi (Nedre Malm)
  - 383 Pihlajamäki (Rönnbacka)
  - 384 Tattariharju (Tattaråsen)
  - 385 Malmin lentokenttä (Malm flygfält)
  - 386 Pihlajisto (Rönninge)
- 39 Tapaninkylä (Staffansby)
  - 391 Tapaninvainio (Staffansslätten)
  - 392 Tapanila (Mosabacka)
- 40 Suutarila (Skomakarböle)
  - 401 Siltamäki (Brobacka)
  - 402 Tapulikaupunki (Stapelstaden)
  - 403 Töyrynummi (Lidamalmen)
- 41 Suurmetsä (Storskog)
  - 411 Puistola (Parkstad)
  - 412 Heikinlaakso (Henriksdal)
  - 413 Tattarisuo (Tattarmossen)
  - 414 Jakomäki (Jakobacka)
  - 415 Alppikylä (Alpbyn)
- 42 Kulosaari (Brändö)
- 43 Herttoniemi (Hertonäs)
  - 431 Länsi-Herttoniemi (Västra Hertonäs)
  - 432 Roihuvuori (Kasberget)
  - 433 Herttoniemen teollisuusalue (Hertonäs industriområde)
  - 434 Herttoniemenranta (Hertonäs strand)
- 44 Tammisalo (Tammelund)
- 45 Vartiokylä (Botby)
  - 451 Vartioharju (Botbyåsen)
  - 452 Puotila (Botby gård)
  - 453 Puotinharju (Botbyhöjden)
  - 454 Myllypuro (Kvarnbäcken)
  - 455 Marjaniemi (Marudd)
  - 456 Roihupellon teollisuusalue (Kasåkers industriområde)
  - 457 Itäkeskus (Östra centrum)
- 46 Pitäjänmäki (Sockenbacka)
  - 461 Pajamäki (Smedjebacka)
  - 462 Tali
  - 463 Reimarla (Reimars)
  - 464 Marttila (Martas)
  - 465 Pitäjänmäen teollisuusalue (Sockenbacka industriområde)
- 47 Mellunkylä (Mellungsby)
  - 471 Kontula (Gårdsbacka)
  - 472 Vesala (Ärvings)
  - 473 Mellunmäki (Mellungsbacka)
  - 474 Kivikko (Stensböle)
  - 475 Kurkimäki (Tranbacka)
- 48 Vartiosaari (Vårdö)
- 49 Laajasalo (Degerö)
  - 491 Yliskylä (Uppby)
  - 492 Jollas
  - 493 Tullisaari (Turholm)
  - 494 Tahvonlahti (Stansvik)
  - 495 Hevossalmi (Hästnässund)
- 50 Villinki (Villinge)
- 51 Santahamina (Sandhamn)
- 52 Suomenlinna (Sveaborg)
- 53 Ulkosaaret (Utöarna)
  - 531 Länsisaaret (Västra holmarna)
  - 532 Itäsaaret (Östra holmarna)
  - 533 Aluemeri (Territorialhavet)
- 54 Vuosaari (Nordsjö)
  - 541 Keski-Vuosaari (Mellersta Nordsjö)
  - 542 Nordsjön kartano (Nordsjö gård)
  - 543 Uutela (Nybondas)
  - 544 Meri-Rastila (Havsrastböle)
  - 545 Kallahti (Kallvik)
  - 546 Aurinkolahti (Solvik)
  - 547 Rastila (Rastböle)
  - 548 Niinisaari (Bastö)
  - 549 Mustavuori (Svarta backen)
- 55 Östersundom
- 56 Salmenkallio (Sundberg)
- 57 Talosaari (Husö)
- 58 Karhusaari (Björnsö)
- 59 Ultuna
  - 591 Landbo
  - 592 Puroniitty (Bäckängen)
- (unnumbered) Aluemeri

== Districts ==
Helsinki divided into major districts, districts and further into sub-districts.

In addition to the borough division, which exists for city planning purposes, the city is also divided into 34 districts (peruspiiri, distrikt) to facilitate the coordination of public services. The districts, which may comprise several boroughs, are organised into eight major districts (suurpiiri, stordistrikt). Different quarters of a borough may belong to different districts, but individual quarters are never divided between boroughs.

The district division was created by a decision of the city council on 13 December 1982, when the number of different subdivisions used by different municipal departments was seen as confusing and problematic. Before the reform, in 1980, there were 101 different divisions used by the departments, of which only 17 corresponded to the official borough division. The new districts came to use within all providers of public services by 1986.

=== List of Helsinki districts ===
- 1 Helsinki southern major district
  - 101 Vironniemi (Estnäs)
  - 102 Ullanlinna (Ulrikasborg)
  - 103 Kampinmalmi (Kampmalmen)
  - 104 Taka-Töölö (Note: These districts correspond with the borough or quarter of the same name.) (Bortre Tölö)
  - 105 Lauttasaari (Drumsö)
- 2 Helsinki western major district
  - 201 Reijola (Grejus)
  - 202 Munkkiniemi (Munksnäs)
  - 203 Haaga (Haga)
  - 204 Pitäjänmäki (Sockenbacka)
  - 205 Kaarela (Kårböle)
- 3 Helsinki central major district
  - 301 Kallio (Berghäll)
  - 302 Alppiharju (Åshöjden)
  - 303 Vallila (Vallgård)
  - 304 Pasila (Böle)
  - 305 Vanhakaupunki (Gammelstaden)
- 4 Helsinki northern major district
  - 401 Maunula (Månsas)
  - 402 Länsi-Pakila (Västra Baggböle)
  - 403 Tuomarinkylä (Domarby)
  - 404 Oulunkylä (Åggelby)
  - 405 Itä-Pakila (Östra Baggböle)
- 5 Helsinki northeastern major district
  - 501 Latokartano (Ladugården)
  - 502 Pukinmäki (Bocksbacka)
  - 503 Malmi (Malm)
  - 504 Suutarila (Skomakarböle)
  - 505 Puistola (Parkstad)
  - 506 Jakomäki (Jakobacka)
- 6 Helsinki southeastern major district
  - 601 Kulosaari (Brändö)
  - 602 Herttoniemi (Hertonäs)
  - 603 Laajasalo (Degerö)
- 7 Helsinki eastern major district
  - 701 Vartiokylä (Botby)
  - 702 Myllypuro (Kvarnbäcken)
  - 703 Mellunkylä (Mellungsby)
  - 704 Vuosaari (Nordsjö)
- 8 Östersundom major district
  - 801 Östersundom

== Other subdivisions ==
Helsinki is also often unofficially divided into four distinct geographic areas. These have no absolute definitions, but they are roughly as follows.

- Central Helsinki: the southern major district (except Lauttasaari) and the southern part of the central major district.
- West Helsinki: the western major district plus Lauttasaari.
- North Helsinki: the northern and northeastern major districts and the northern part of the central major district.
- East Helsinki: the eastern and southeastern major districts.

The city is also divided into postal code areas numbered between 10 and 99. Postal codes for private residences in Helsinki have the form 00xx0, where the initial '00' shows that the postal code is located in Helsinki, the next two digits show the postal code area, and the final zero indicates that the code is for a private residence (post offices use the number one, and other numbers are set aside for large businesses that have their own postal codes). (See also Postal codes in Finland.)

== See also ==
- Subdivisions of Tampere
