= Geography of Helsinki =

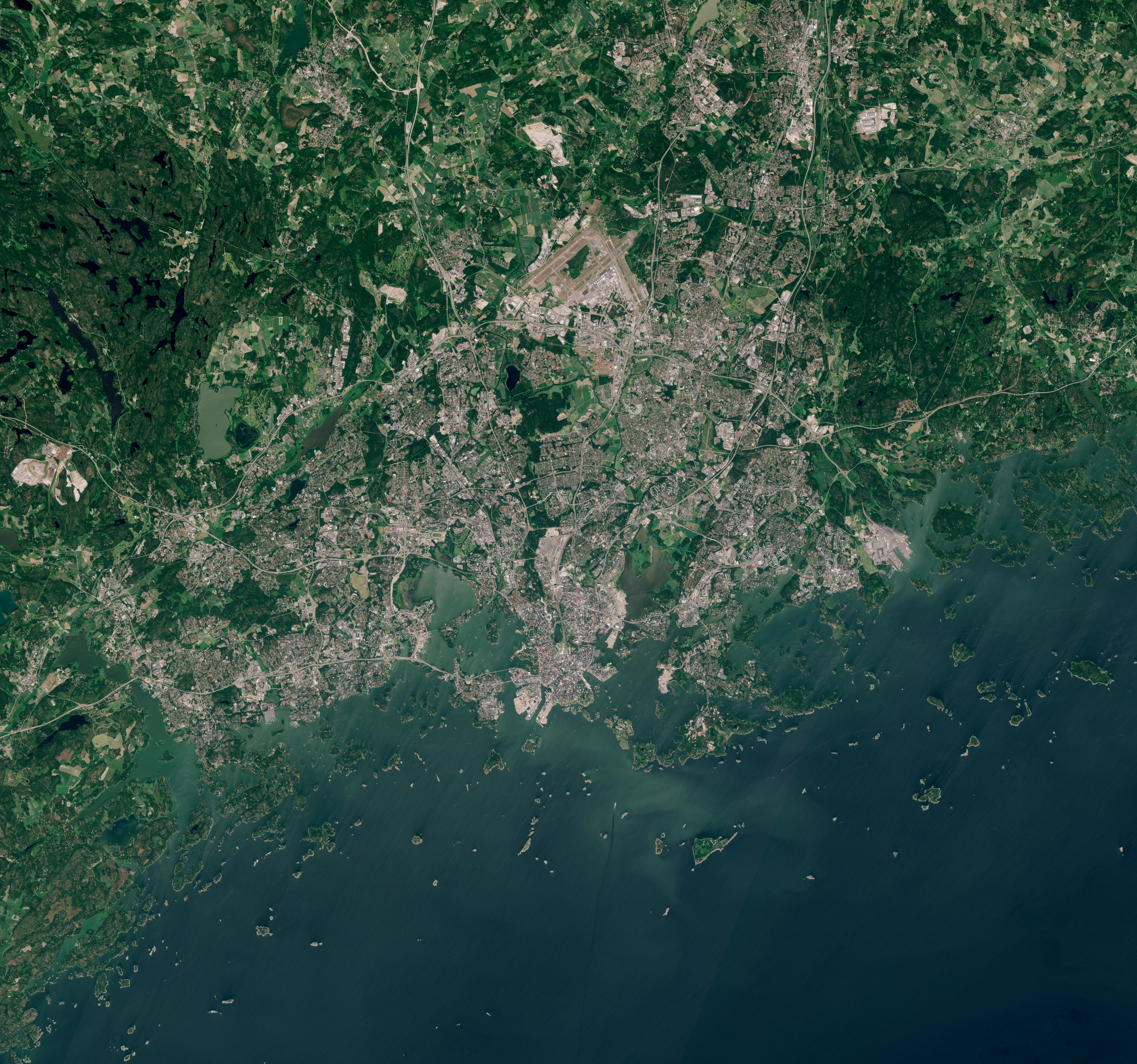
Satellite image of Helsinki by Sentinel-2

Helsinki has a total area of 686 km^{2} (265 sq mi). 186 km^{2} (72 sq mi) of it is land and 500 km^{2} (190 sq mi) of the area is covered with water. It is located at 60°10′N 24°56′E.

== Subdivisions ==
This is a listing of the neighborhoods and localities in the city of Helsinki in alphabetical order. The list is not complete.

- Ala-Tikkurila
- Alppikylä
- Alppila
- Arabianranta
- Aurinkolahti
- Eira
- Haaga
- Hakaniemi
- Hakuninmaa
- Harju
- Heikinlaakso
- Hermanni
- Herttoniemi
- Hietalahti
- Hietaniemi
- Honkasuo
- Huopalahti
- Itäkeskus
- Jakomäki
- Jollas
- Jätkäsaari
- Kaartinkaupunki
- Kaisaniemi
- Kaivopuisto
- Kalasatama
- Kallahti
- Kallio
- Kamppi
- Kannelmäki
- Karhusaari
- Katajanokka
- Kivihaka
- Kivikko
- Kluuvi
- Konala
- Kontula
- Koskela
- Kruununhaka
- Kruunuvuorenranta
- Kulosaari
- Kumpula
- Kuninkaantammi
- Kurkimäki
- Kuusisaari
- Käpylä
- Laajasalo
- Laakso
- Landbo
- Lassila
- Latokartano
- Lauttasaari
- Lehtisaari
- Malmi
- Malminkartano
- Marjaniemi
- Maunula
- Maununneva
- Meilahti
- Mellunmäki
- Meri-Rastila
- Metsälä
- Munkkiniemi
- Munkkivuori
- Myllypuro
- Oulunkylä
- Pajamäki
- Pakila
- Paloheinä
- Pasila
- Pihlajamäki
- Pihlajisto
- Pikku Huopalahti
- Pitäjänmäki
- Puistola
- Pukinmäki
- Puotila
- Puotinharju
- Punavuori
- Rastila
- Reimarla
- Roihuvuori
- Ruoholahti
- Ruskeasuo
- Santahamina
- Siilitie
- Siltamäki
- Suomenlinna
- Suurmetsä
- Suutarila
- Sörnäinen
- Tammisalo
- Tapanila
- Tapaninkylä
- Tapulikaupunki
- Torpparinmäki
- Toukola
- Tuomarinkylä
- Töölö
- Ullanlinna
- Vallila
- Vanhakaupunki
- Vartioharju
- Vartiosaari
- Vesala
- Viikki
- Vuosaari
- Östersundom

== Climate ==
- Average temperature (2001): +5.9 °C (42 °F)
- Warmest month, July, average temperature: +17.2 °C (63 °F)
- Coldest month, February, average temperature: -4.7 °C (23 °F)

Climate data for Downtown Helsinki (Kaisaniemi)
Month	Jan	Feb	Mar	Apr	May	Jun	Jul	Aug	Sep	Oct	Nov	Dec	Year
Record high °C (°F)	8.5 (47.3)	11.8 (53.2)	17.1 (62.8)	21.9 (71.4)	29.6 (85.3)	32.0 (89.6)	33.2 (91.8)	31.2 (88.2)	26.2 (79.2)	19.4 (66.9)	11.6 (52.9)	10.0 (50.0)	33.2 (91.8)
Mean daily maximum °C (°F)	−1.3 (29.7)	−1.9 (28.6)	1.6 (34.9)	7.6 (45.7)	14.4 (57.9)	18.5 (65.3)	21.5 (70.7)	19.8 (67.6)	14.6 (58.3)	9.0 (48.2)	3.7 (38.7)	0.5 (32.9)	9.0 (48.2)
Daily mean °C (°F)	−3.9 (25.0)	−4.7 (23.5)	−1.3 (29.7)	3.9 (39.0)	10.2 (50.4)	14.6 (58.3)	17.8 (64.0)	16.3 (61.3)	11.5 (52.7)	6.6 (43.9)	1.6 (34.9)	−2.0 (28.4)	5.9 (42.6)
Mean daily minimum °C (°F)	−6.5 (20.3)	−7.4 (18.7)	−4.1 (24.6)	0.8 (33.4)	6.3 (43.3)	10.9 (51.6)	14.2 (57.6)	13.1 (55.6)	8.7 (47.7)	4.3 (39.7)	−0.6 (30.9)	−4.5 (23.9)	2.9 (37.2)
Record low °C (°F)	−34.3 (−29.7)	−31.5 (−24.7)	−24.5 (−12.1)	−16.3 (2.7)	−4.8 (23.4)	0.7 (33.3)	5.4 (41.7)	2.8 (37.0)	−4.5 (23.9)	−11.6 (11.1)	−18.6 (−1.5)	−29.5 (−21.1)	−34.3 (−29.7)
Average precipitation mm (inches)	52 (2.0)	36 (1.4)	38 (1.5)	32 (1.3)	37 (1.5)	57 (2.2)	63 (2.5)	80 (3.1)	56 (2.2)	76 (3.0)	70 (2.8)	58 (2.3)	655 (25.8)
Average snowfall cm (inches)	20 (7.9)	24 (9.4)	15 (5.9)	0.4 (0.2)	0 (0)	0 (0)	0 (0)	0 (0)	0 (0)	0 (0)	3 (1.2)	10 (3.9)	72 (28)
Mean monthly sunshine hours	38	70	138	194	284	297	291	238	150	93	36	29	1,858
Source 1: Climatological statistics for the normal period 1981–2010
Source 2: Helsinki, Kaisaniemi: climatological table (data source: open data)

== See also ==
- Helsinki Metropolitan Area
