= Pukinmäki =

Pukinmäki Bocksbacka
- Helsinki Subdivision
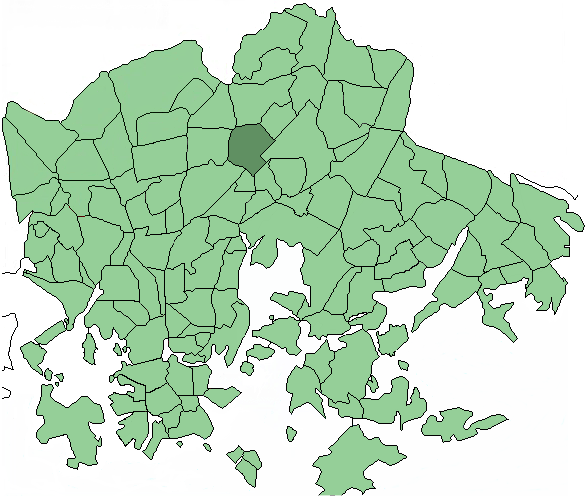
- Position of Pukinmäki within Helsinki
- Coordinates: 60.245576°N 24.989127°E
- Country: Finland
- Region: Uusimaa
- Sub-region: Greater Helsinki
- Municipality: Helsinki
- District: Northeastern
- Area: 1.91 km^{2} (0.74 sq mi)
- Population: 8,450
  - Density: 4,424/km^{2} (11,460/sq mi)
- Postal codes: 00720, 00721
- Subdivision number: 502 (district); 37 (neighbourhood)
- Neighbouring subdivisions: Patola, Itä-Pakila, Tuomarinkartano, Tapaninvainio, Ylä-Malmi, Ala-Malmi, Pihlajamäki, Veräjälaakso

Pukinmäki (Swedish: Bocksbacka) is a district in the northeastern part of Helsinki, Finland. As of 2005, it had a population of 8,450.

Pukinmäki is located next to Ring I.

Pukinmäki railway station is located in Pukinmäki.

Pukinmäki was one of the oldest villages in the former Helsinge parish.

In 1910, a residential area was planned next to where the railway station is now. The area was annexed to Helsinki in 1946 and the first few blocks of flats were built in 1960s. Most of the flats are from the 1970s and 1980s.

== Politics ==
Results of the 2011 Finnish parliamentary election in Pukinmäki:

- Social Democratic Party: 25.7%
- National Coalition Party: 20.6%
- True Finns: 16.9%
- Green League: 12.2%
- Left Alliance: 9.2%
- Centre Party: 6.5%
- Christian Democrats: 3.3%
- Swedish People's Party: 2.5%

== Gallery ==
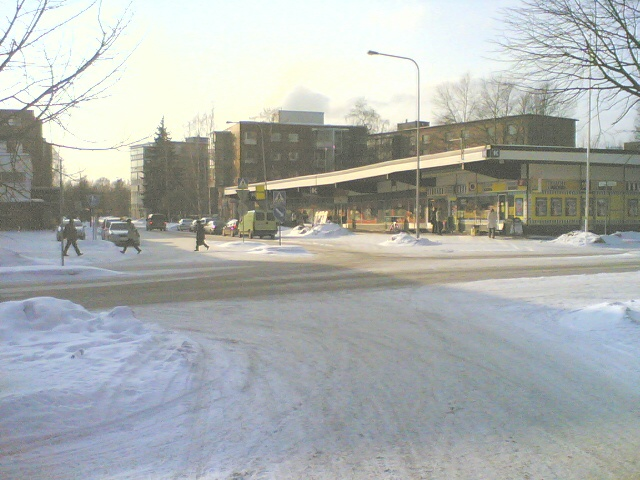

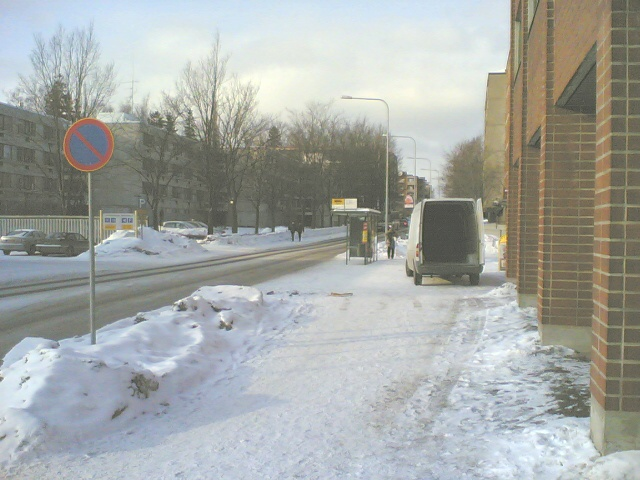

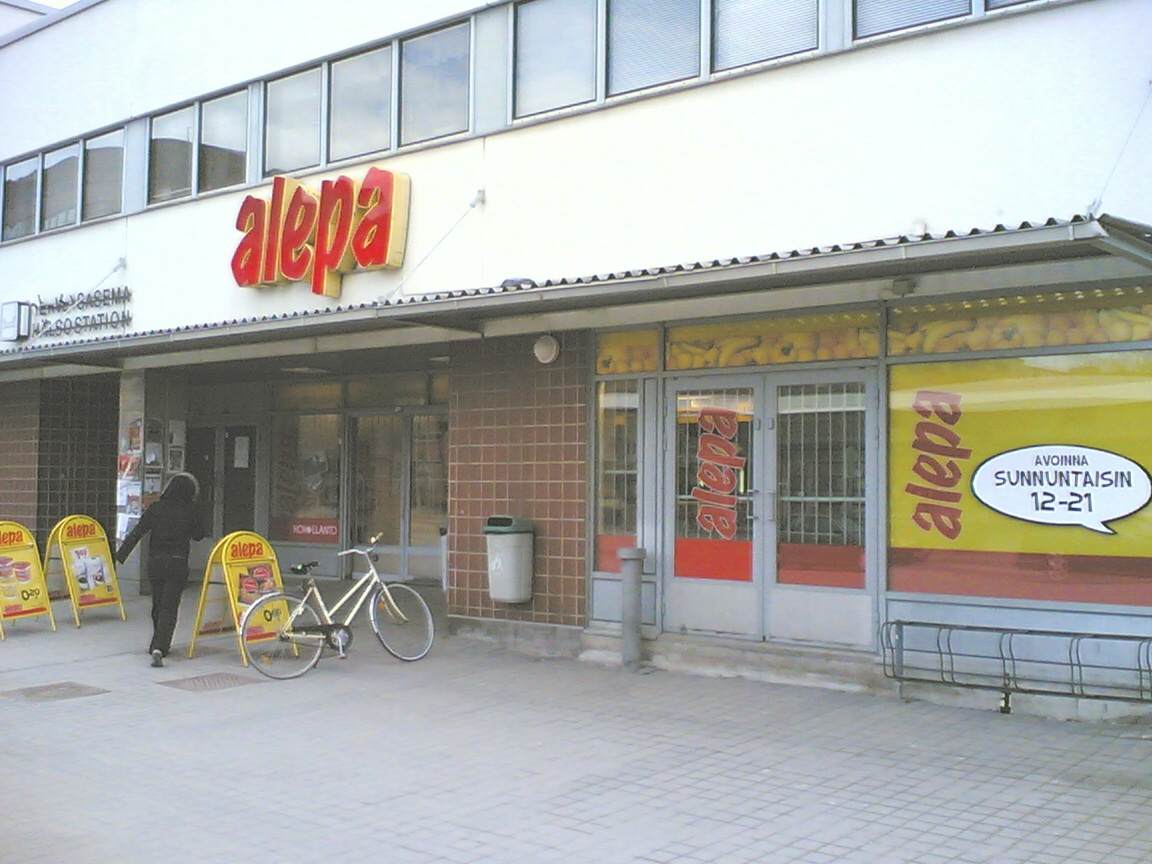
