= North Helsinki =

Northern division of Helsinki, Finland

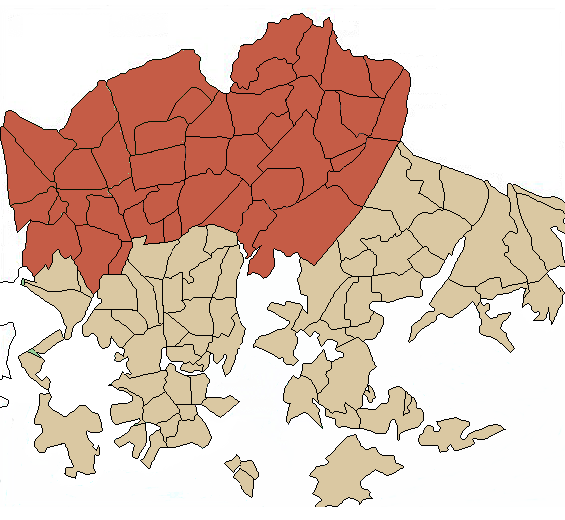
Helsinki City areas as a whole. Areas of North Helsinki are marked in red.

North Helsinki (Finnish: Pohjois-Helsinki, Swedish: Norra Helsingfors) is a major area in Helsinki, Finland that was part of Vantaa before the great annexation of 1946. Many single-family houses were built in the area in the 1940s and 1950s due to the settlement of front-line soldiers and evacuees. The term pakiloutinum describes the development of the later decades, when terraced and semi-detached houses were built on the large plots of single-family houses and terraced houses.

In the city's official regional division, Pohjoinen suurpiiri is one of Helsinki's seven major districts, which is divided into five basic districts, which are Maunula, Länsi-Pakila, Tuomarinkylä, Oulunkylä and Itä-Pakila.

== See also ==
- Subdivisions of Helsinki
  - East Helsinki
  - Helsinki Downtown
