= Malmi, Helsinki =

Neighbourhood of Helsinki, Finland

Coordinates: 60°15′01″N 25°00′35″E

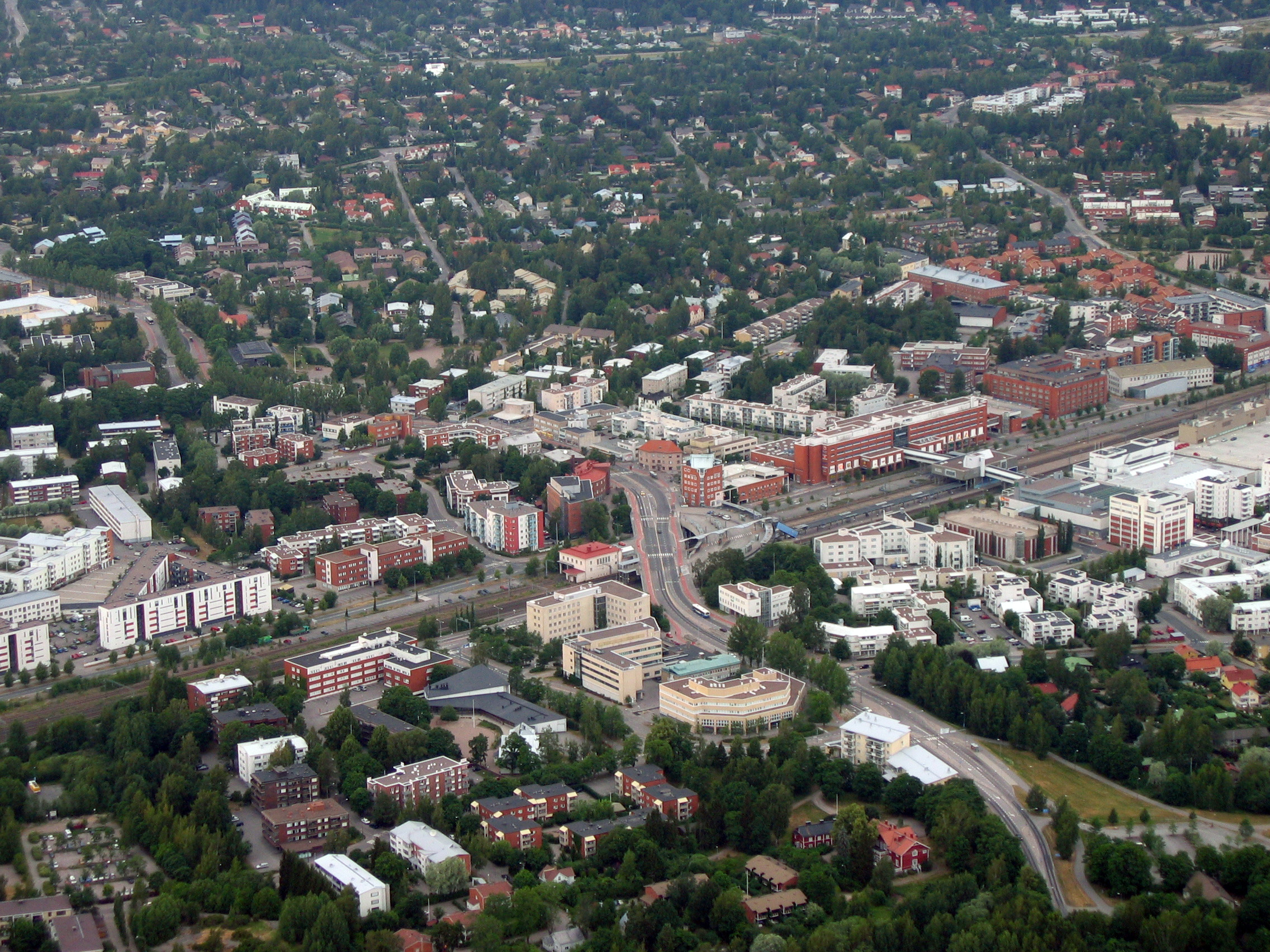
An aerial view of Malmi center

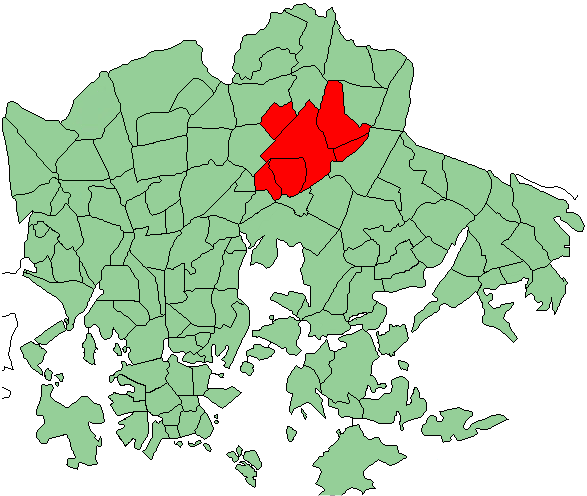
Districts of Helsinki, Malmi highlighted

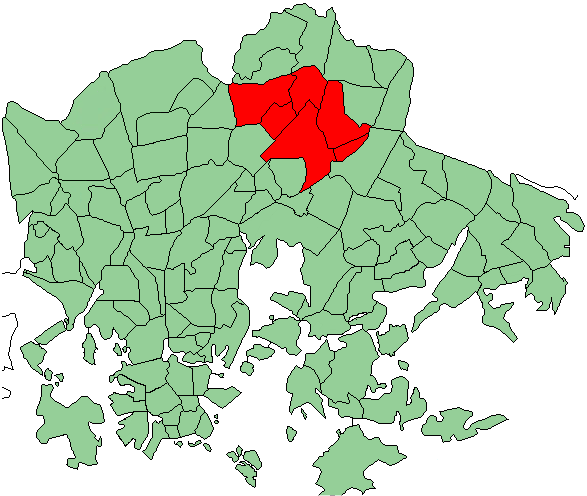
Malmin peruspiiri highlighted

Malmi (Finnish: [ˈmɑlmi]; Swedish: Malm) is a regional center and a major district in the north-eastern part of Helsinki, Finland. It has a population of 24,312 (2008). The Malmi District (Finnish: Malmin kaupunginosa) is divided into six subareas, two of which form the center: Ylä-Malmi ("Upper Malmi") and Ala-Malmi ("Lower Malmi"), and the rest are Tattariharju, Malminkenttä ("Malmi Field", former Malmi Airport). Malmin peruspiiri is a related but distinct subdivision of Helsinki (used for certain administrative purposes) which does not include Pihlajamäki and Pihlajisto, but instead includes Tapanila and Tapaninvainio. The population of this area is approximately 27,800.

Its main transport links include the main railway dividing the city center into Ylä-Malmi and Ala-Malmi, as well as the ring road called Ring I (Finnish: Kehä I) in the southern part of the district. Along the railway, Malmi has its own railway station. The closed Malmi Airport was located in the eastern part of the district. Also, Malmi is home to the Malmi Cemetery, the largest cemetery of Finland. The Malmi shooting range hosted the pistol and rifle shooting events of the 1952 Summer Olympics.

== Etymology ==
The name of Malmi appears in old documents in the forms Malm (1543), Malmby (1551), Malme (1589), Malmsby (1590) and Malmn (1592). The name is the same as the word malm in the Swedish dialects of Uusimaa, meaning flat and sandy forest land. The word refers in particular to a wooded somersault above its surroundings, such as a gravel ridge. The word has been common in the parish of Helsinki, judging by the names of the 18th century, such as Keimola's Tappermalm, Voutila–Viinikkala's Mottmalm, Tikkurila–Hakkila's Haxmalm and Länsisalmi's Brändmalm and Sandmalm. The Finnish counterparts Malmi and Malminkylä came into use at the end of the 19th century. Among the old farms in Malminkylä, Paavolantie (Swedish: Påvals), Pietiläntie (Swedish: Pehrs), Vilppulantie (Swedish: Filpus), Yrjölänkuja (Swedish: Örjans) and Örskinkuja (Swedish: Örskis) have been preserved in the street name. The original form of the name Ormusmäki (Swedish: Ormusbacka) is Orrmossebacken (Finnish: Teerisuonmäki). In English, Malmi literally means ore.

== Gallery ==
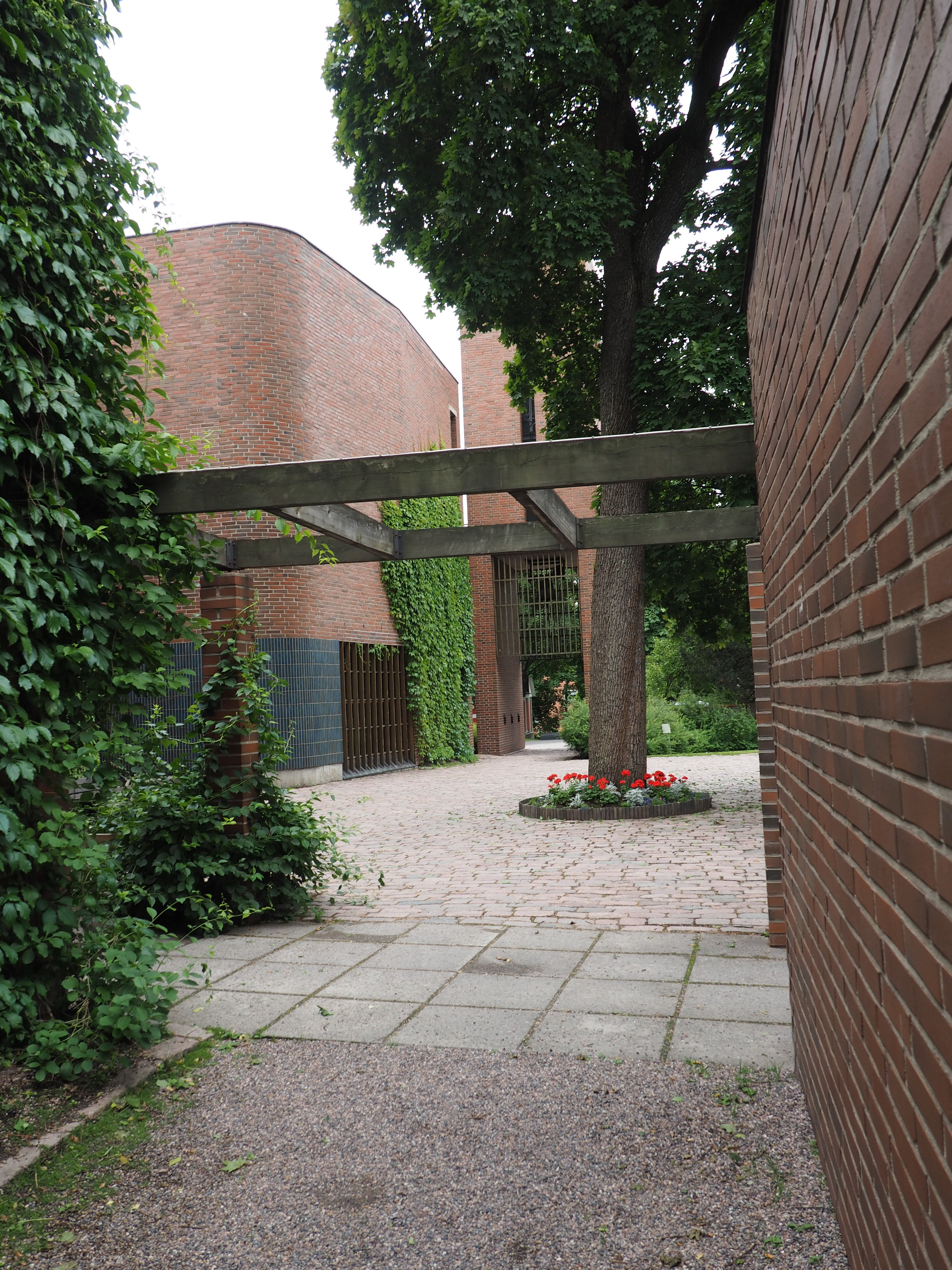
Kristian Gullichsen, Malmi Church, Helsinki (1982)

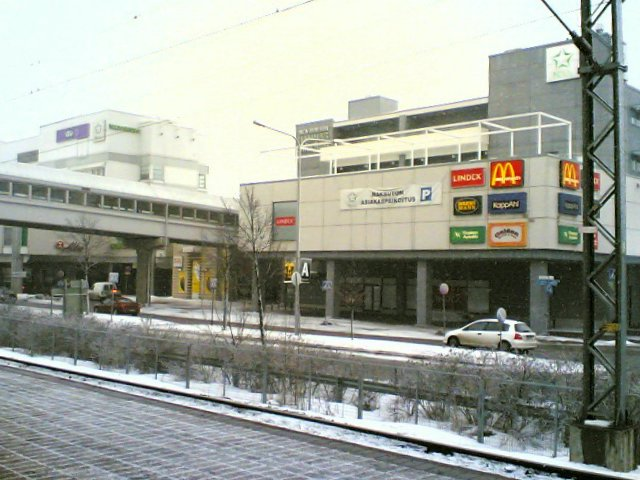
Malmin Nova shopping centre in Ala-Malmi

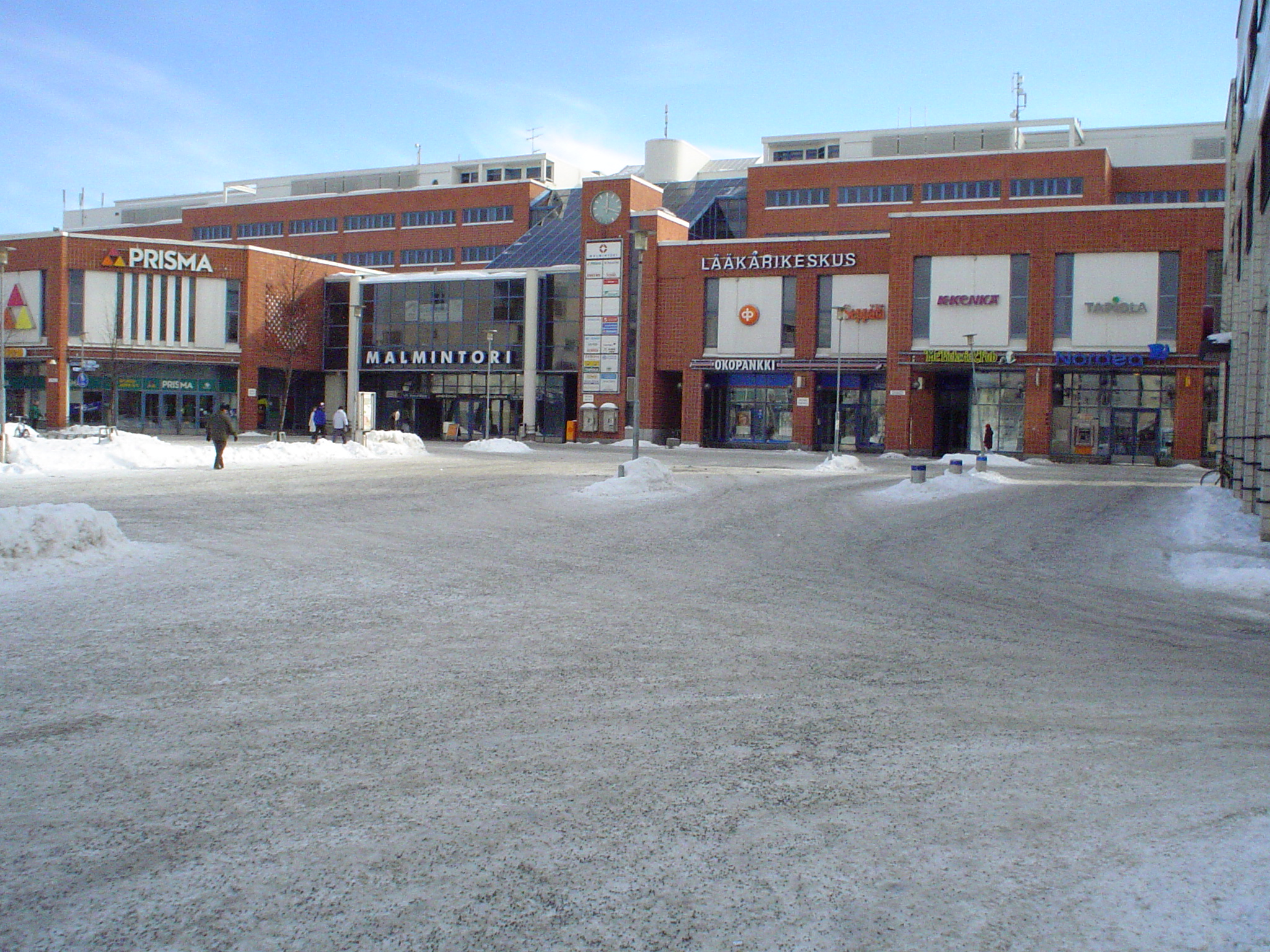
Malmintori shopping centre in Ylä-Malmi

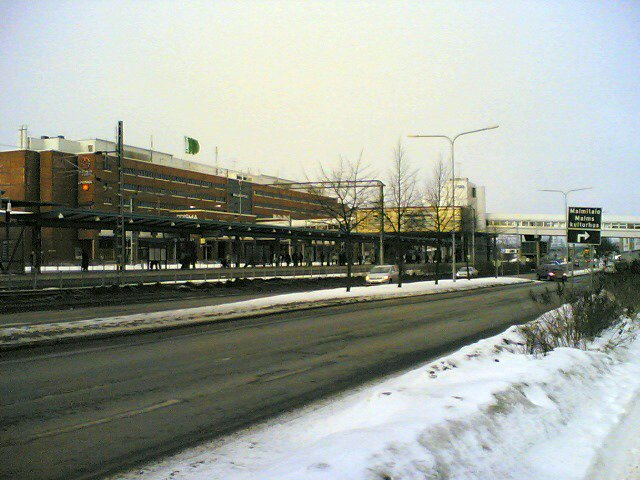
Malmi railway station

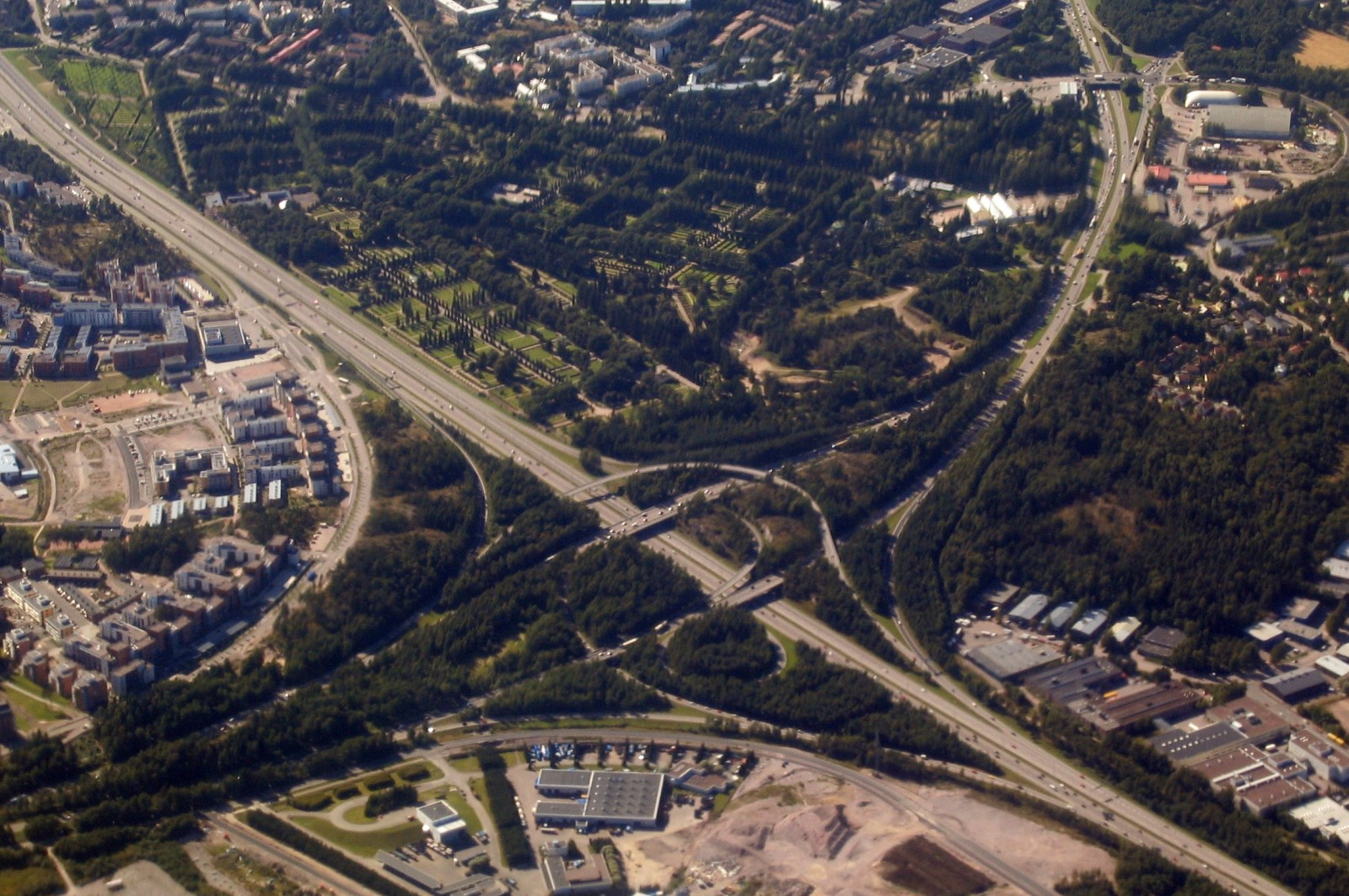
Aerial view of the Malmi Cemetery

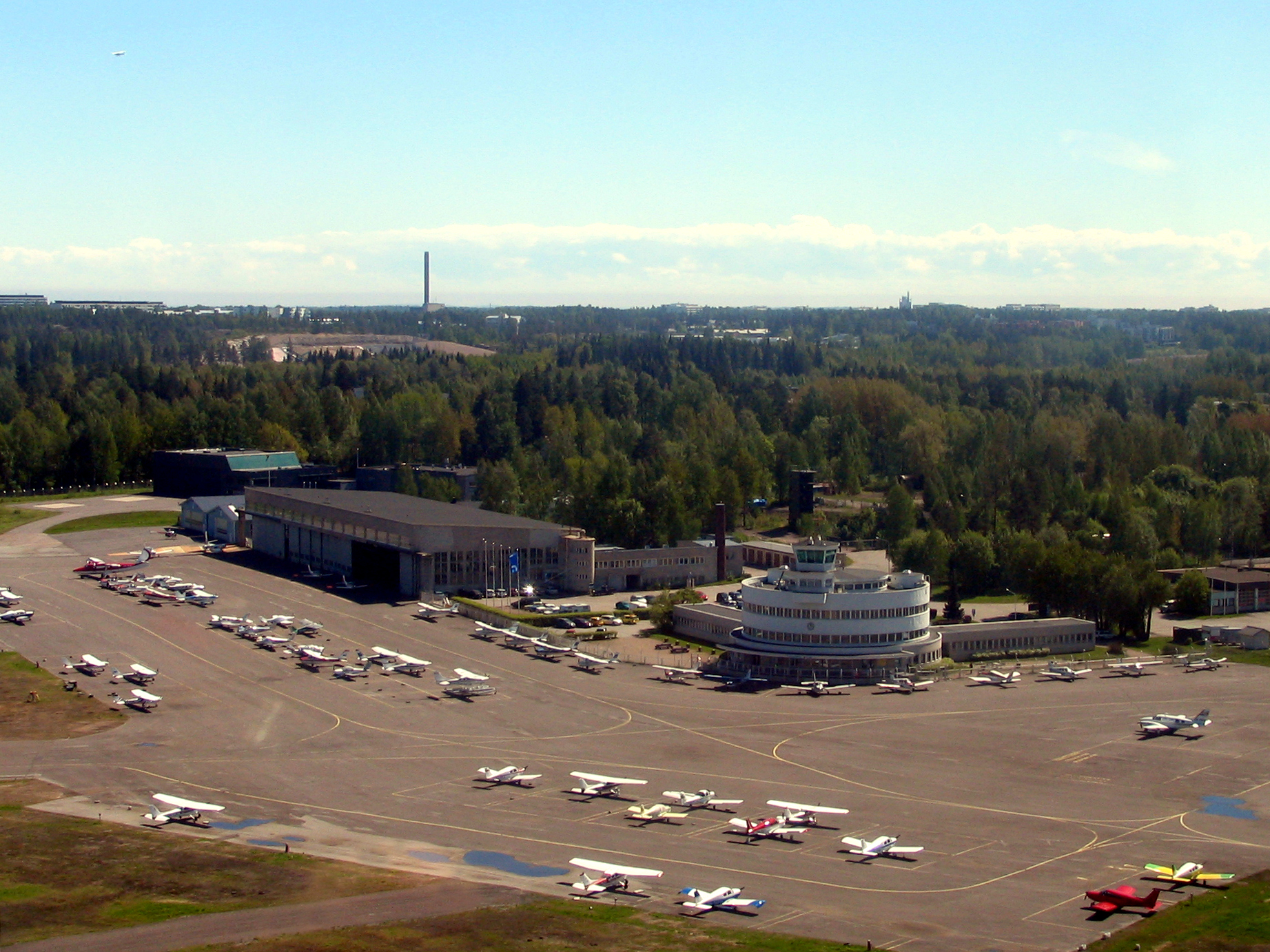
Malmi Airport's field and terminal building

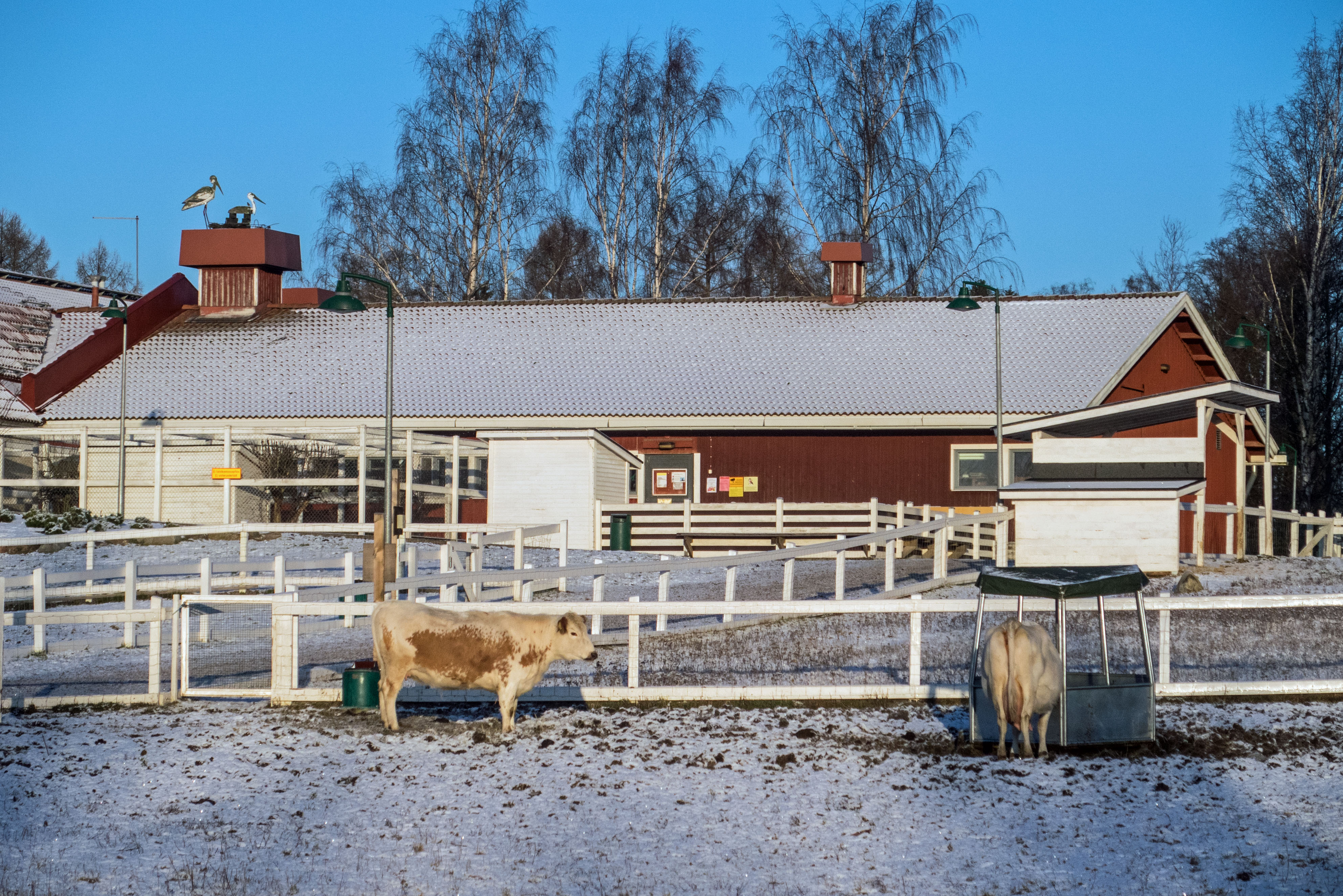
Fallkulla Animal Farm

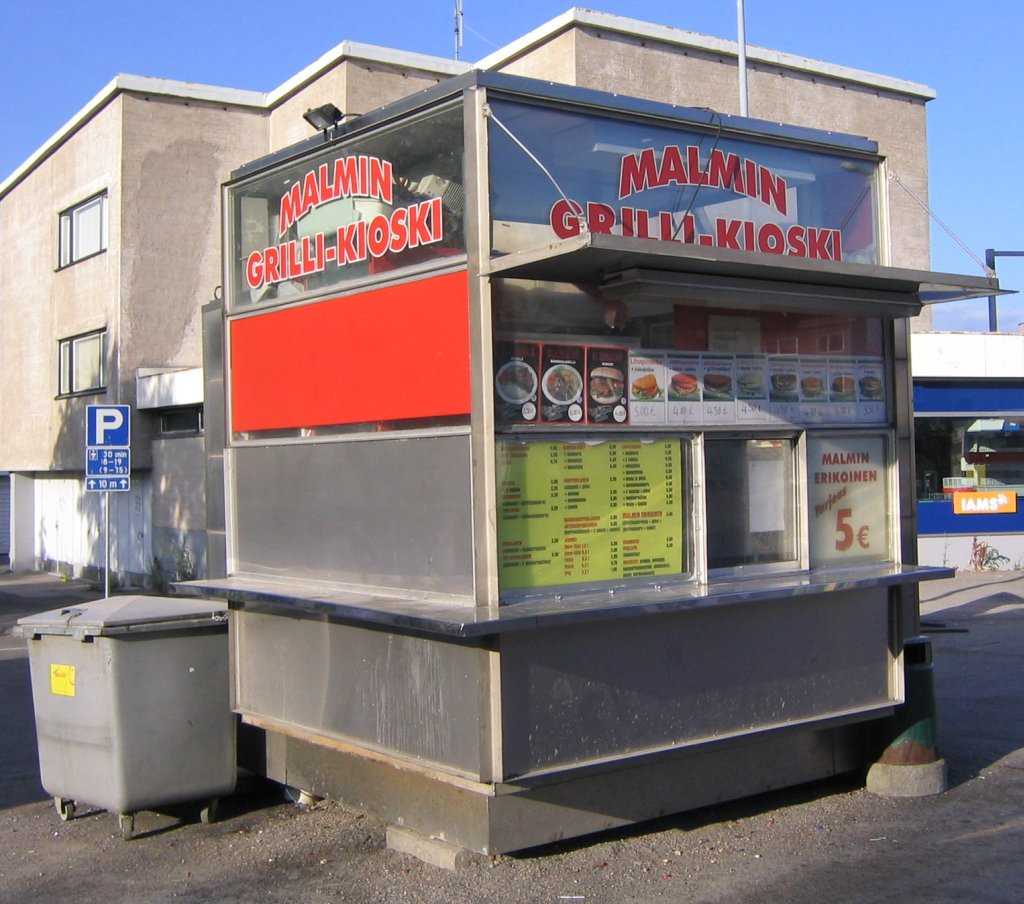
Malmin grilli-kioski, a snack bar in Malmi

== See also ==
- Itäkeskus
- Pakila
- Viikki
