= Pakila =

Coordinates: 60°15′N 24°57′E

Pakila Baggböle
- Helsinki Subdivision
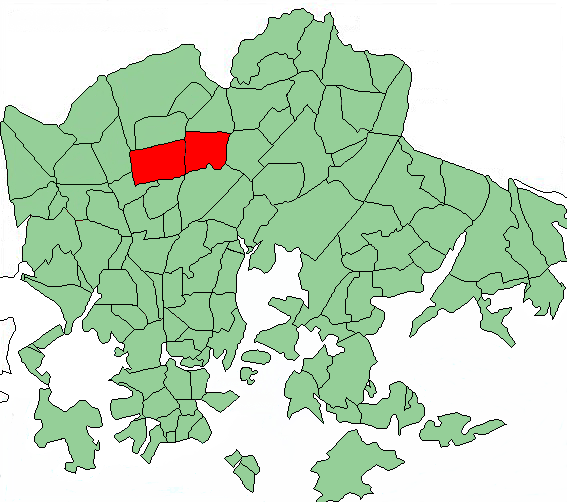
- Position of Pakila within Helsinki
- Country: Finland
- Region: Uusimaa
- Sub-region: Greater Helsinki
- Municipality: Helsinki
- District: Northern
- Area: 4.08 km^{2} (1.58 sq mi)
- Population (1.1.2014): 10,275
  - Density: 2,518/km^{2} (6,520/sq mi)
- Postal codes: 00660, 00680
- Subdivision number: 34
- Neighbouring subdivisions: Kaarela, Oulunkylä, Pukinmäki, Tuomarinkylä

Pakila (Swedish: Baggböle) is a neighbourhood in Northern Helsinki, about nine kilometers from the city center. It comprises Länsi-Pakila ("West Pakila") and Itä-Pakila ("East Pakila"). Pakila has approximately 10 275 inhabitants.

In Pakila the average size of the apartments is the second largest in Helsinki, 98 m^{2}.

Since the 1970s, the largest party in Pakila has been the National Coalition. The National Coalition Party was the most popular party in Pakila in the 2012 municipal elections (50% support) and in the 2015 parliamentary elections (44% support).

Pakila is home to many celebrities, such as Antero Vartia, Arto Bryggare, Erkki Junkkarinen, Jimi Constantine, Kari Hotakainen, Martti Larni, Oskari Mörö, Samuli Laiho, and Signmark.
