= Mustavuori =

Mustavuori Svarta backen
- Helsinki Subdivision
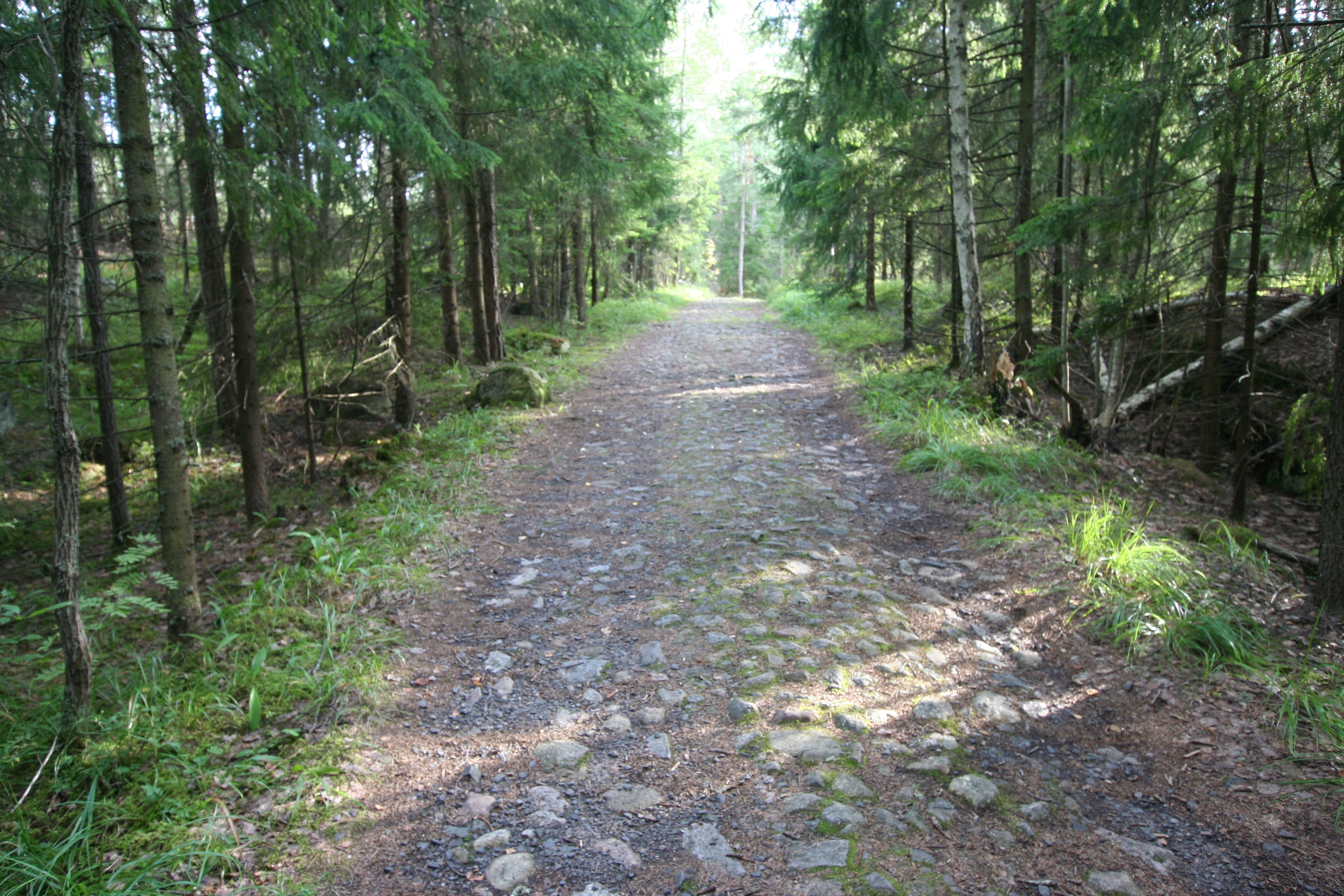
- Mustavuori tykkitie

- Location within Helsinki (mainland) Location within Finland
- Coordinates: 60°13′52″N 25°08′39″E
- Country: Finland
- Region: Uusimaa
- Sub-region: Greater Helsinki
- Municipality: Helsinki
- District: Eastern
- Subdivision regions: none
- Area: 1.00 km^{2} (0.39 sq mi)
- Population (2005): 0
  - Density: 0/km^{2} (0/sq mi)
- Subdivision number: 549
- Neighbouring subdivisions: Niinisaari, Nordsjön kartano, Keski-Vuosaari, Mellunmäki, Salmenkallio, Hakunila, Länsisalmi

Mustavuori (Finnish), Svarta backen (Swedish) is a subdivision of Vuosaari, an eastern neighbourhood of Helsinki, Finland.
