= Pihlajamäki =

Pihlajamäki Rönnbacka
- Helsinki Subdivision
- Interactive map of Pihlajamäki
- Country: Finland
- Region: Uusimaa
- Sub-region: Greater Helsinki
- Municipality: Helsinki
- District: Northeastern
- Area: 1.65 km^{2} (0.64 sq mi)
- Population (2008): 7,443
  - Density: 4,511/km^{2} (11,680/sq mi)
- Postal codes: 00710
- Neighbouring subdivisions: Pihlajisto; Ala-Malmi; Viikin tiedepuisto

Pihlajamäki (Finnish), Rönnbacka (Swedish) is a north-central quarter in Helsinki, the capital of Finland. It is part of the Malmi neighbourhood and the Latokartano district.

== Architecture ==
Pihlajamäki is an important site for modern Finnish architecture, and was the first of Helsinki's suburbs built in the 1960s that was conserved en bloc with a town plan. The architecture of the suburb is unassuming, but there is a distinct polarity in the buildings and surrounding scenery, which creates rich nuances.

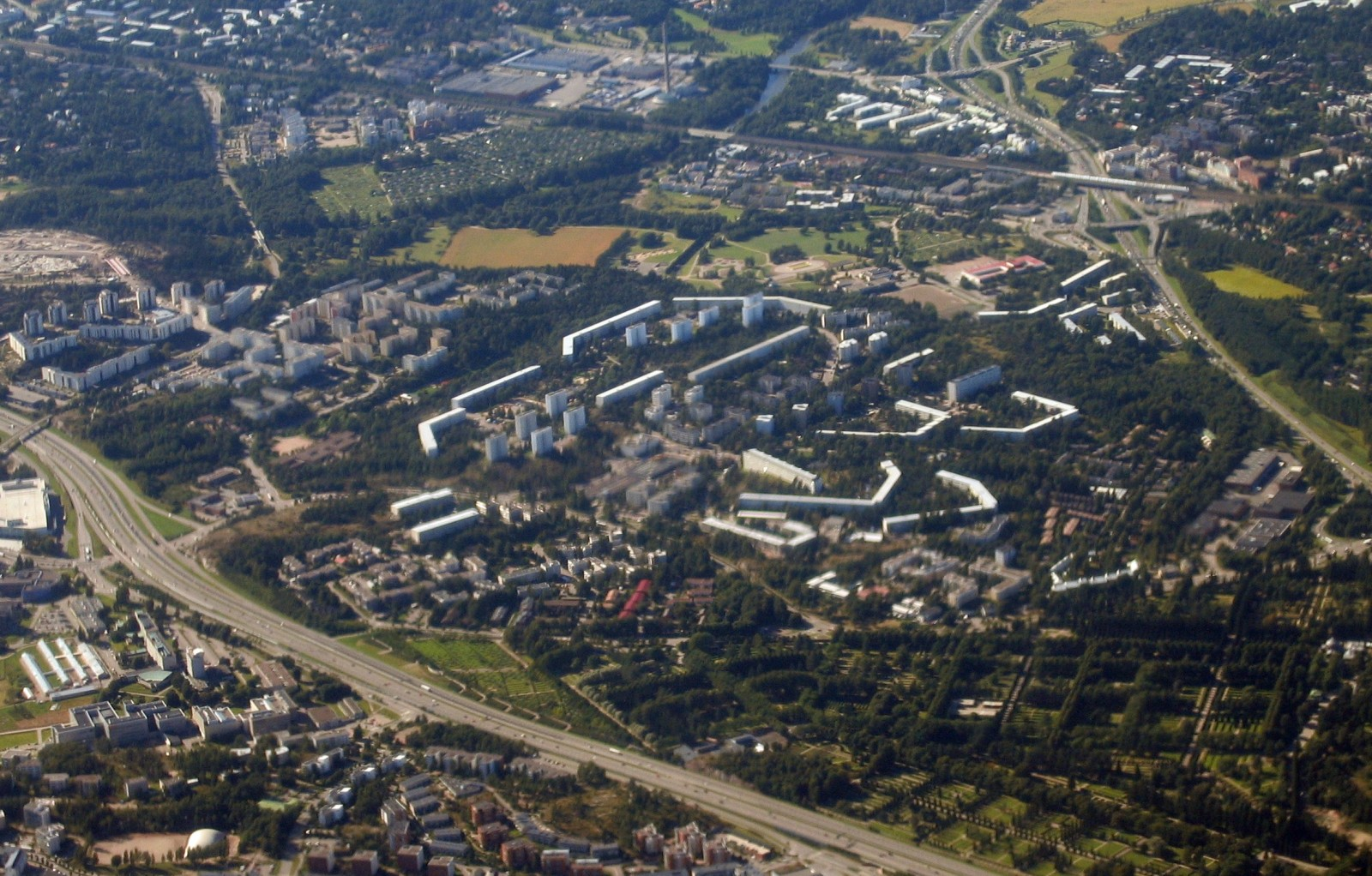
Aerial view of Pihlajamäki in 2009.

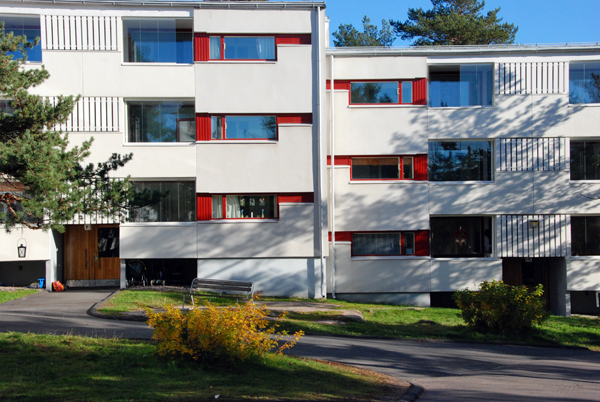
A conserved building in Pihlajamäki.
