= Talosaari =

Talosaari Husö
- Helsinki Subdivision
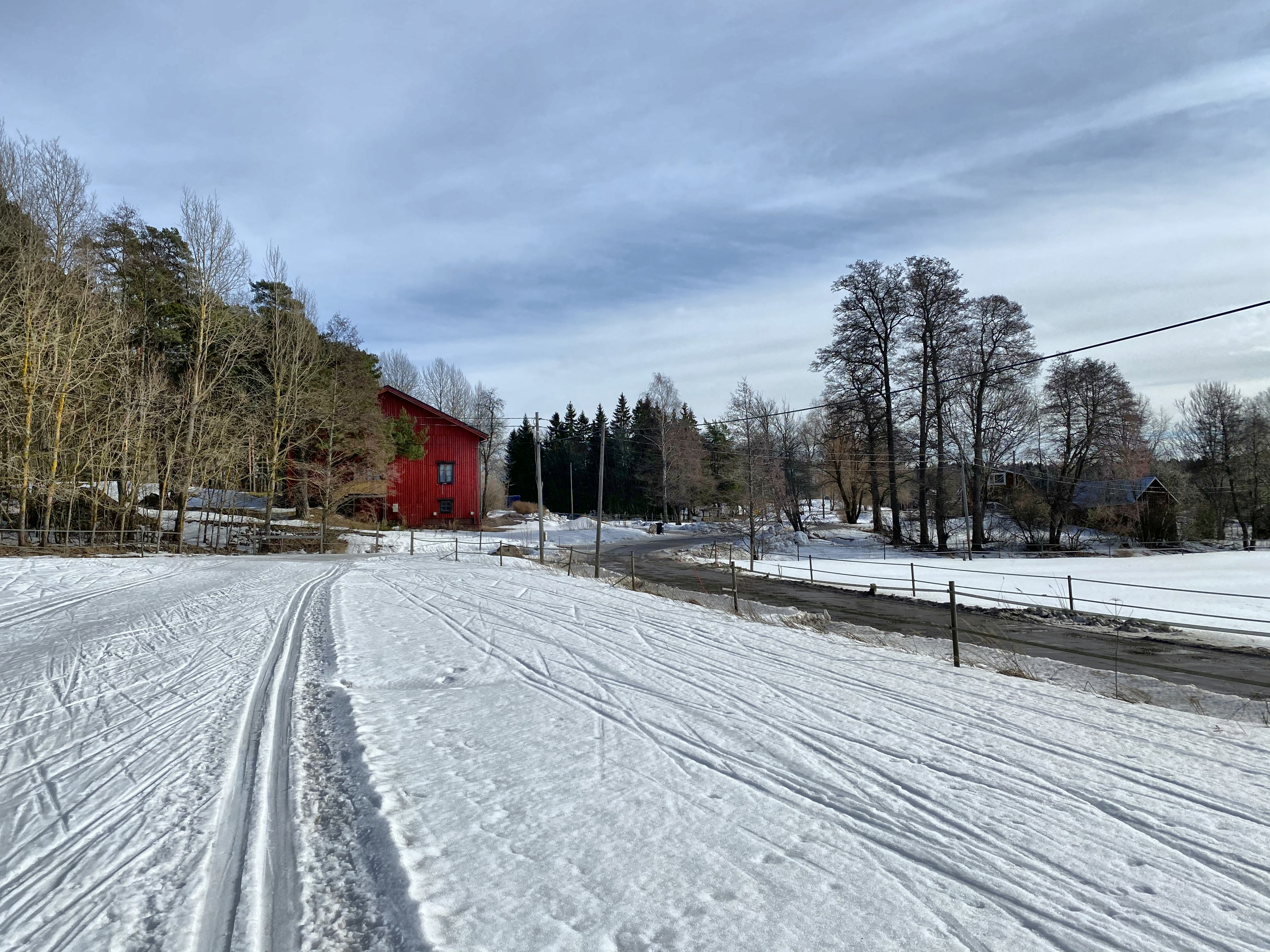
- Ski tracks af Talosaari, Helsinki
- Interactive map of Talosaari
- Coordinates: 60.24215°N 25.19729°E
- Country: Finland
- Region: Uusimaa
- Sub-region: Greater Helsinki
- Municipality: Helsinki
- District: Östersundom
- Population: 58
- Time zone: Summer (DST): EEST -UTC+3 Winter: EET - UTC+3
- Subdivision number: 57
- Neighbouring subdivisions: Vuosaari, Salmenkallio, Östersundom, Karhusaari

Talosaari (Finnish), Husö (Swedish) is a subdistrict of Helsinki, Finland.
