= Tuomarinkylä =

Coordinates: 60°16′N 24°56′E

Tuomarinkylä Domarby
- Helsinki Subdivision
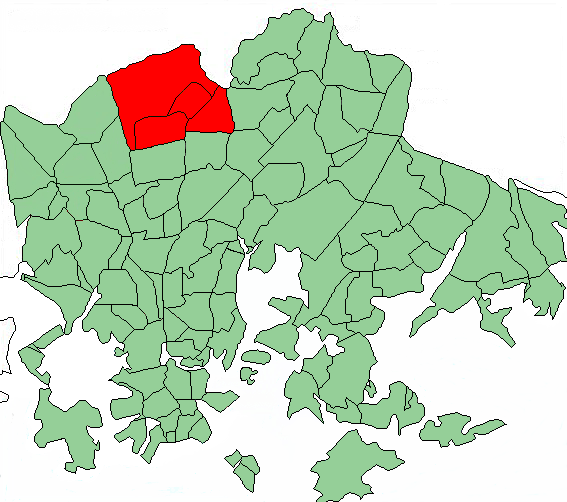
- Position of Tuomarinkylä within Helsinki
- Country: Finland
- Region: Uusimaa
- Sub-region: Greater Helsinki
- Municipality: Helsinki
- District: Northern
- Area: 1,056 km^{2} (408 sq mi)
- Population (1 January 2004): 9,035
  - Density: 856/km^{2} (2,220/sq mi)
- Postal codes: 00670, 00690
- Subdivision number: 35
- Neighbouring subdivisions: Kaarela, Pakila, Pukinmäki, Tapaninkylä

Tuomarinkylä (Swedish: Domarby) is a neighbourhood in Northern Helsinki. It comprises Haltiala, Paloheinä, Torpparinmäki and Tuomarinkartano.
