= Kivihaka =

Coordinates: 60.2109°N 24.9030°E

Kivihaka Stenhagen
- Helsinki Subdivision
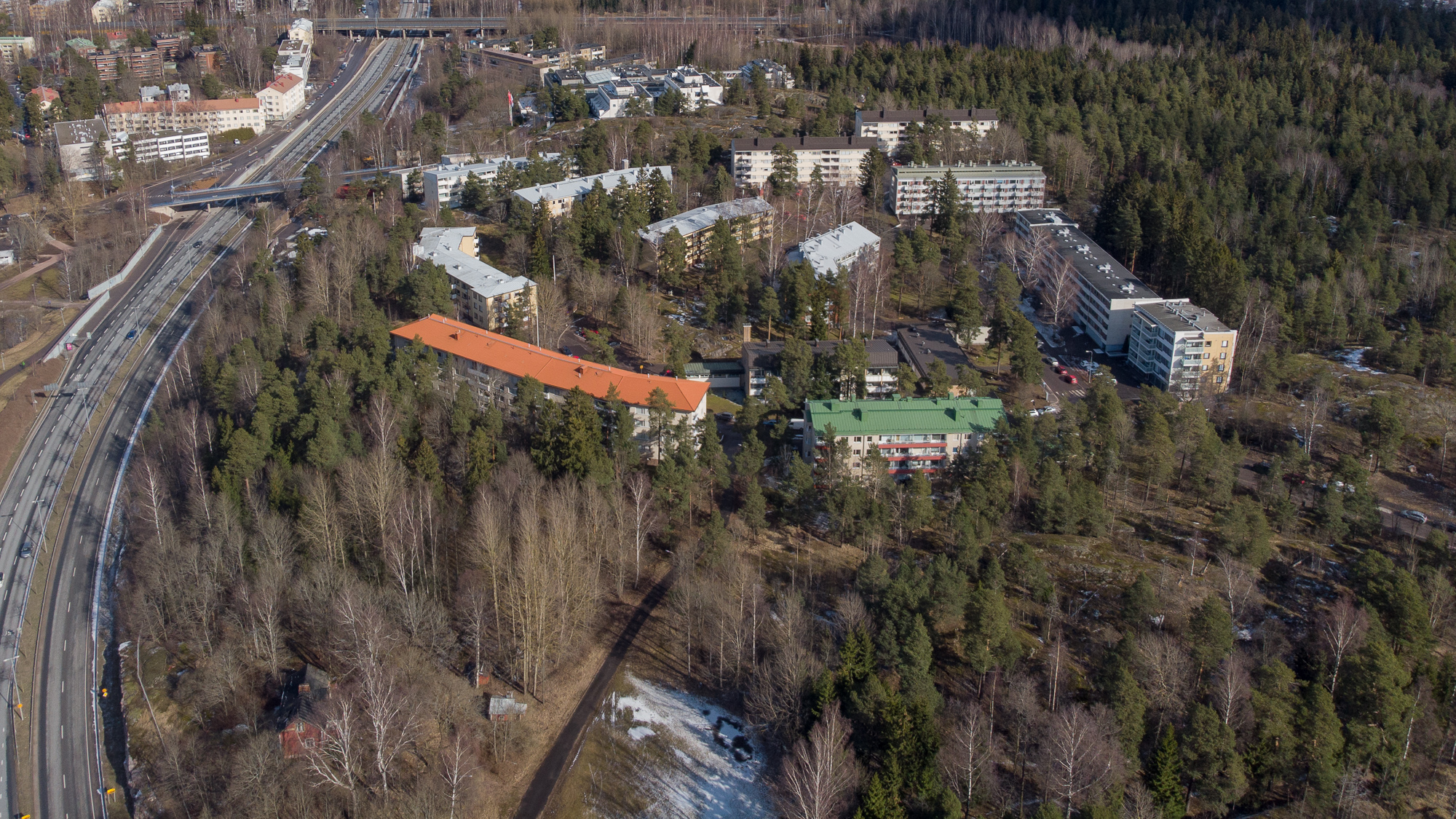

- Position of Kivihaka within Helsinki
- Country: Finland
- Region: Uusimaa
- Sub-region: Greater Helsinki
- Municipality: Helsinki
- District: Western
- Area: 0.43 km^{2} (0.17 sq mi)
- Population: 836
  - Density: 1,900/km^{2} (4,900/sq mi)
- Postal codes: 00310
- Subdivision number: 292
- Neighbouring subdivisions: Etelä-Haaga; Pohjois-Haaga; Länsi-Pasila; Pohjois-Pasila; Ruskeasuo; Central Park

Kivihaka (Finnish), Stenhagen (Swedish) is a neighborhood of Helsinki, Finland. Kivihaka is a small neighborhood next to Etelä-Haaga, on the other side of Hämeenlinnanväylä. In Kivihaka, you live in a forested environment, but the services of Etelä Haaga are very close as well. Pasila and shopping center Tripla are also only a short distance away. Kivihaka has opportunities for outdoor activities - the extensive walking paths of Keskuspuisto open right from the front door, and the Pirkkola sports grounds and the Pasila sports hall are also in the neighborhood. Hämeenlinnanväylä's fast buses make getting to the center quicker.
