= Tapaninvainio =

Tapaninvainio (in Finnish) Staffansslätten (in Swedish)
- Neighborhood of Helsinki
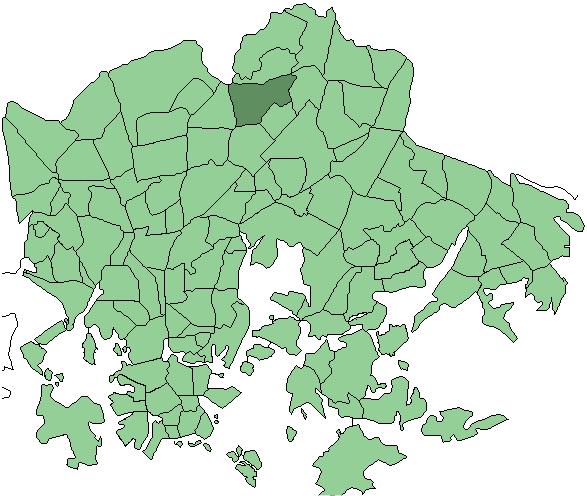
- Location in Helsinki
- Coordinates: 60.25957°N 24.98498°E
- Country: Finland
- Province: Southern Finland
- Region: Uusimaa
- Sub-region: Helsinki
- Time zone: UTC+2 (EET)
  - Summer (DST): UTC+3 (EEST)

Tapaninvainio (Finnish), Staffansslätten (Swedish) is a residential area with mostly single-family houses in northeastern Helsinki, Finland. Together with Tapanila, it forms the Tapaninkylä district. Tapaninvainio had a population of 7,945 in 2013.

Tapaninvainio has good outdoor activities near the Vantaanjoki River and the Tuomarinkylä Manor. The area is located on the east bank of the Vantaanjoki River. Tapaninkyläntie, which runs north of Tapaninvainio, acts as a border towards Suutarilan Töyrynummi and Siltamäki. In the east, on the other side of Kotinummentie, Tapanila begins. In the south, the neighbors are the Ylä-Malmi and Pukinmäki districts. Tapaninvainio has several bus connections to the city center of Helsinki, Itäkeskus, the Airport, and the Malmi and Pukinmäki train stations.

== History ==
A central part of Tapaninvainio's history is Kapteenskanmäki, which is now a playground and outdoor recreation area. The hill is named after the Russian captain and countess Manfeja Multanovskaya. The elegantly dressed captain with her talking parrots was a familiar figure to the residents of the area.(subscription required) Kapteenskanmäki was home to Multanovskaya's manor, animal stables, confectionery factory and, during the war, a bomb shelter, on the other side of Karhusuontie.

The manor – originally the main building of the Åsmus farm – was finally demolished in 1957, having fallen into serious disrepair. Markings on the wall logs date its construction to 1811.
