= Karhusaari =

Coordinates: 60°15′N 25°13′E

Karhusaari Björnsö
- Helsinki Subdivision
- Position of Karhusaari within Helsinki
- Country: Finland
- Region: Uusimaa
- Sub-region: Greater Helsinki
- Municipality: Helsinki
- District: Östersundom
- Population: 381
- Subdivision number: 58
- Neighbouring subdivisions: Östersundom, Talosaari, Sipoo

Karhusaari (Finnish), Björnsö (Swedish) is a subdistrict of Helsinki, Finland. It is an island.
