= Salmenkallio =

Salmenkallio Sundberg
- Helsinki Subdivision
- Location within Helsinki
- Country: Finland
- Region: Uusimaa
- Sub-region: Greater Helsinki
- Municipality: Helsinki
- District: Östersundom
- Population: 40
- Subdivision number: 56
- Neighbouring subdivisions: Vuosaari, Mellunmäki, Östersundom, Talosaari, Vantaa

Salmenkallio (Finnish), Sundberg (Swedish) is a subdistrict of Helsinki, Finland.
