= Länsi-Pakila =

Coordinates: 60°15′N 24°55′E

Länsi-Pakila (in Finnish) Västra Baggböle (in Swedish)
- Neighborhood of Helsinki
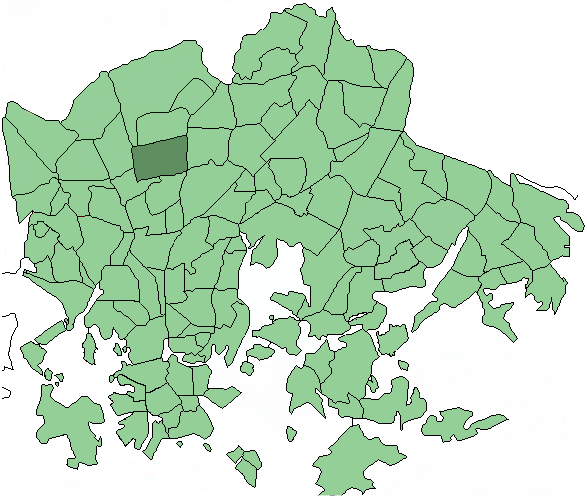
- Location in Helsinki
- Country: Finland
- Province: Southern Finland
- Region: Uusimaa
- Sub-region: Helsinki
- Time zone: UTC+2 (EET)
  - Summer (DST): UTC+3 (EEST)

Länsi-Pakila (Finnish), Västra Baggböle (Swedish) is a neighbourhood in Northern Helsinki, about nine kilometers from the city center. Länsi-Pakila has approximately 6 874 inhabitants (1.1.2014).

In Länsi-Pakila the average size of the apartments is the second largest in Helsinki, 98 m^{2}.

Since the 1970s, the largest party in Länsi-Pakila has been Coalition. The National Coalition Party was the most popular party in Länsi-Pakila in the 2012 municipal elections (50% support) and in the 2015 parliamentary elections (44% support).

== Notable people ==
- Antero Vartia
- Arto Bryggare
- Erkki Junkkarinen
- Jimi Constantine
- Kari Hotakainen
- Martti Larni
- Oskari Mörö
- Signmark
