= Suutarila =

Coordinates: 60°17′N 25°02′E

Suutarila (in Finnish) Skomakarböle (in Swedish)
- Subdistrict of Helsinki
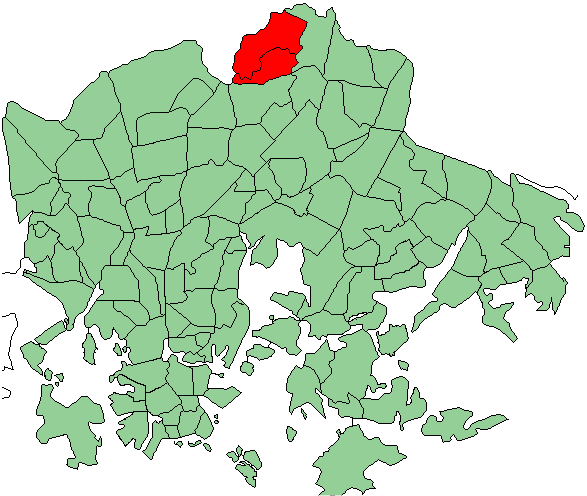
- Location in Helsinki
- Country: Finland
- Province: Southern Finland
- Region: Uusimaa
- Sub-region: Helsinki

Area
  - Total: 1.59 sq mi (4.13 km^{2})

Population
  - Total: 11,413
  - Density: 7,160/sq mi (2,763/km^{2})
- Time zone: UTC+2 (EET)
  - Summer (DST): UTC+3 (EEST)

Suutarila (Swedish: Skomakarböle) is a subdistrict located next to Keravanjoki in a northeastern major district of Helsinki, Finland, near the border with Vantaa.

It has an area of 4.13 km^{2} and a population of 11,413. The neighbouring areas in Helsinki are Tapaninvainio and Tapulikaupunki. Neighbouring areas in Vantaa are Tikkurila, Tammisto and Veromies.
