= Pohjois-Pasila =

Pohjois-Pasila Norra Böle
- Helsinki Subdivision
- Position of Pohjois-Pasila within Helsinki
- Country: Finland
- Region: Uusimaa
- Sub-region: Greater Helsinki
- Municipality: Helsinki
- District: Central
- Area: 2.02 km^{2} (0.78 sq mi)
- Population: 0
  - Density: 0/km^{2} (0/sq mi)
- Postal codes: 00230, 00240, 00520
- Subdivision number: 172

Pohjois-Pasila (Finnish), Norra Böle (Swedish) is a neighborhood in the Pasila subdivision of Helsinki, Finland.

Posti Group, the Finnish mail corporation, has its head office in Pohjois-Pasila.

The tracks north of the Ilmala railway station and the VR depot extend into Pohjois-Pasila.
