= Pihlajisto =

Coordinates: 60°14′N 25°00′E

Pihlajisto (in Finnish) Rönninge (in Swedish)
- Neighborhood of Helsinki
- Interactive map of Pihlajisto (in Finnish); Rönninge (in Swedish)
- Country: Finland
- Province: Southern Finland
- Region: Uusimaa
- Sub-region: Helsinki
- Time zone: UTC+2 (EET)
  - Summer (DST): UTC+3 (EEST)

Pihlajisto (Finnish), Rönninge (Swedish) is a northern-central quarter in Helsinki, the capital of Finland. It is part of the Malmi neighbourhood.
