= Martti Larni =

Finnish writer (1909–1993)

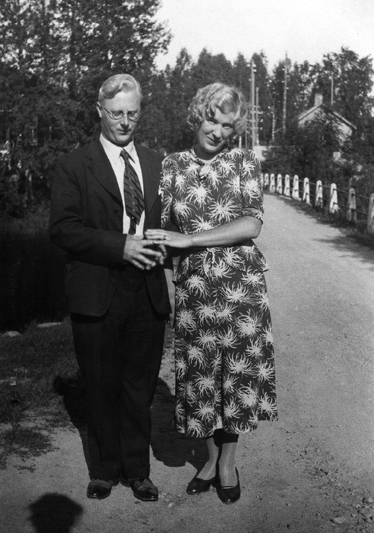
- Martti Larni with his wife Viola
- Born: September 22, 1909; Pakila
- Died: March 7, 1993 (aged 83); Helsinki
- Occupation: Writer

Martti Larni (birth name Martti Johannes Laine) (September 22, 1909 – March 7, 1993) was a Finnish writer. He was the chairman of the Union of Finnish Writers from 1964 to 1967. During his lifetime, Larni was one of Finland's most internationally known writers in the Soviet Union and other Eastern Bloc countries thanks to his book Neljäs nikama (The Fourth Vertebra).

== Biography ==
Larni was the fourth of the nine children of master painter Johan Viktor Laine and Matilda Puntila. While attending public school, he was a shepherd at his mother's house in Hauho during the summers; these experiences later contributed to the book Hyvien ihmisten kylä (The Village of Good People). He started writing poems and short stories at the age of 15, and his poems were first published in a magazine called Juttutupa in 1926. He became a member of Nuoren Voima Liito (The Union of Young Powers), a non-profit literary organization, in 1928.

After public school, Larni worked as a garden assistant and attended a cooperative school. In the years 1937–1951, he was the editor of Elanto, a magazine published by the Helsinki-based progressive cooperative Elanto. He lived in the United States in 1948–1949 and 1951–1954, working as a journalist for the publishing house of the Co-operative Central Exchange. After returning to Finland, he worked from 1955 to 1965 as the editor of Me Kuluttajat magazine and from 1956 to 1959 as a department head of the Central Confederation of Consumer Cooperatives. He is buried in Malmi Cemetery.

== Career ==
Larni's first novel was Seikkailuja Saamenmaaa (Adventures in Saami), published in 1936 under the pseudonym Aslak Nuorti. His next book, Kuilu, published in 1937, caused an uproar because it dealt with sensitive topics such as the Finnish civil war (from the point of view of the Reds) and homosexuality. It told the story of journalist and writer Unto Kamara, who had a homosexual relationship with a literary scholar called Dr. H. As the civil war begins, Kamara joins the Reds and kills Dr. H.; he is captured by the whites and the white officers demand sexual services from him in exchange for a lighter sentence. After his release, Kamara tries to change his life and gets married. In the end, however, he kills his wife and commits suicide. Right-wing readers and critics attacked the book due to its bold content, considering it sick and morally harmful. Partly because of this criticism, Larni did not publish another book until 1942, having previously changed his last name from Laine to Larni. During the war, he wrote scripts for Suomi-Filmi and collaborated with director Valentin Vaala on many films.

One of Larni's books written after the war, Lähällä syntia (Close to Sin) (1946), was the basis for Hannu Leminen's film of the same name, which premiered in 1955. In 1957, based on his experiences in the United States, Larni wrote the book Neljäs nikama eli Veijari vastoin tahtoaan (The Fourth Vertebra, or a Scamp Despite Himself), a satire on American society with its quick marriages, commercialism, and ignorance of the rest of the world. The main character, Jeremias Suomalainen, moves to the United States and soon becomes professor and miracle healer Jerry Finn. The book's title comes from the fact that one of its characters, the chiropractor Isaac Rivers, believes that all back diseases are caused by the fourth vertebra of the spine. Unbeknownst to Larni, the work was translated in the Soviet Union in 1959 and immediately became a huge success there as well as in other Eastern European countries.

Larni continued writing the same type of satirical books, but they did not achieve the popularity of The Fourth Vertebra. His works have been translated into 20 different languages, and he was awarded the Pro Finlandia medal in 1966.

== Works ==
- Seikkailuja Saamenmaassa (1936)
- Kuilu (1937)
- Hyvien ihmisten kylä (1942)
- Arvokkaat köyhät ja heidän kirjava seurakuntansa (1944)
- Kahden maailma (1944)
- Laulun miekka (1944)
- Malttamaton intohimo (1945)
- Äidin kädet (1945)
- Lähellä syntiä (1946)
- Musta Venus (1946)
- Juokseva lähde (1947)
- Taivas laskeutui maahan (1948)
- Musta Venus (1951)
- Minnesota palaa (1952)
- Neljäs nikama eli Veijari vastoin tahtoaan – The Fourth Vertebra, or a Scamp Despite Himself (1957)
- Kaunis sikopaimen eli Talousneuvos Minna Karlsson-Kanasen muistelmia (1959)
- Suomalainen mollikissa (1962)
- Tästä ei puhuta julkisesti (1964)
- Uskomatonta onnea (1966)
- Esikoispoika (1968)
- Sokrates Helsingissä ja muita tarinoita (1972)
- Laugh With Larni (1973)
- Isät äitiyslomalle ja muita tarinoita (1978)
