= Aluemeri =

Coordinates: 60°00′N 25°00′E

Aluemeri (in Finnish) Territorialhavet (in Swedish)
- Neighborhood of Helsinki
- Location in Helsinki
- Country: Finland
- Province: Southern Finland
- Region: Uusimaa
- Sub-region: Helsinki
- District: Southeastern
- Sub-district: Ulkosaaret

Area
  - Land: 0 km^{2} (0 sq mi)

Population (1.1.2010)
  - Total: 0
  - Density: 0/km^{2} (0/sq mi)
- Time zone: UTC+2 (EET)
  - Summer (DST): UTC+3 (EEST)

Aluemeri (Finnish), Territorialhavet (Swedish) is a southeastern neighborhood of Helsinki, Finland. It essentially only consists of outer coastal water of the Gulf of Finland that does not reach to the coast.
