= Heikinlaakso =

Coordinates: 60°16′N 25°04′E

Heikinlaakso (in Finnish) Henriksdal (in Swedish)
- Neighborhood of Helsinki
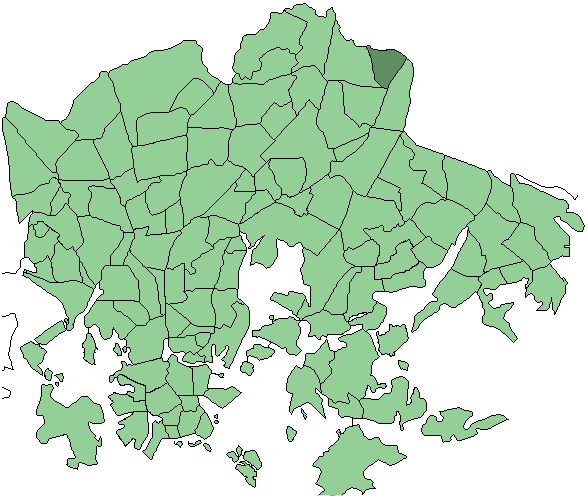
- Location in Helsinki
- Country: Finland
- Province: Southern Finland
- Region: Uusimaa
- Sub-region: Helsinki
- Time zone: UTC+2 (EET)
  - Summer (DST): UTC+3 (EEST)

Heikinlaakso (Finnish), Henriksdal (Swedish) is a northeastern neighborhood of Helsinki, Finland.

== Politics ==
Results of the 2011 Finnish parliamentary election in Heikinlaakso:

- National Coalition Party 29.3%
- Social Democratic Party 21.6%
- True Finns 17.8%
- Green League 11.2%
- Left Alliance 7.0%
- Centre Party 5.6%
- Christian Democrats 3.1%
- Swedish People's Party 1.5%
