= Veräjälaakso =

Veräjälaakso (in Finnish) Grinddal (in Swedish)
- Neighborhood of Helsinki
- Interactive map of Veräjälaakso (in Finnish); Grinddal (in Swedish)
- Coordinates: 60.2339°N 24.9791°E
- Country: Finland
- Province: Southern Finland
- Region: Uusimaa
- Sub-region: Helsinki
- Time zone: UTC+2 (EET)
  - Summer (DST): UTC+3 (EEST)

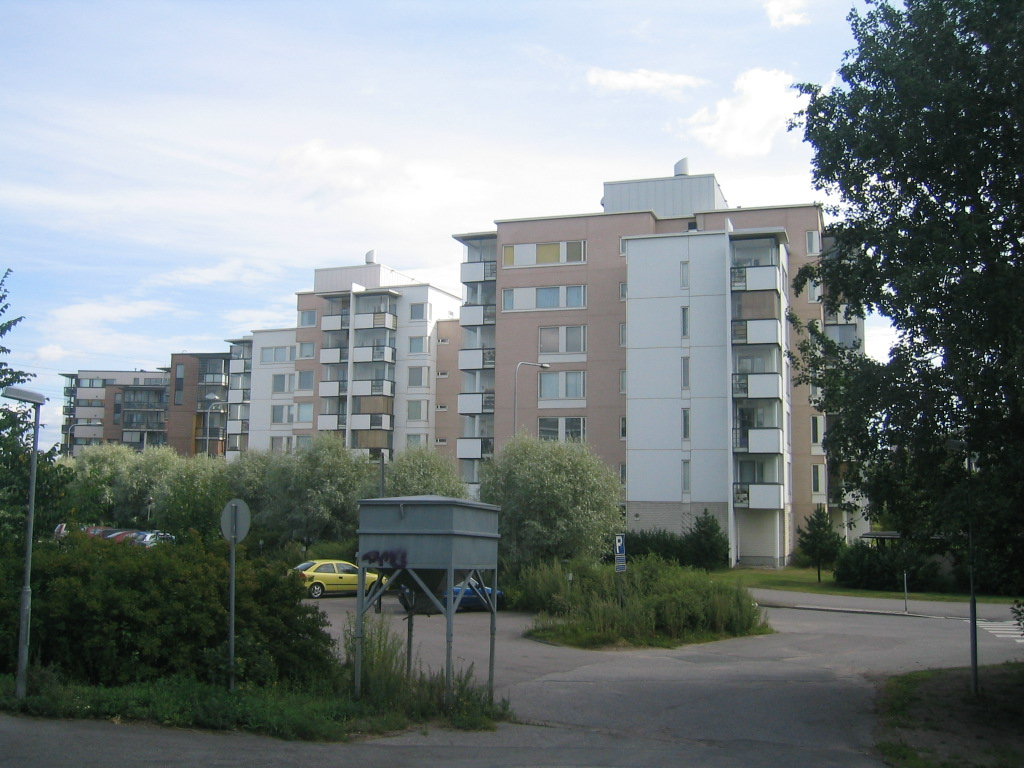
Veräjälaakso neighborhood in Helsinki, Finland

Veräjälaakso (Finnish), Grinddal (Swedish) is a northern-central neighborhood of Helsinki, Finland.
