= Puotinharju =

Coordinates: 60°13′N 25°05′E

Puotinharju (in Finnish) Botbyhöjden (in Swedish)
- Neighborhood of Helsinki
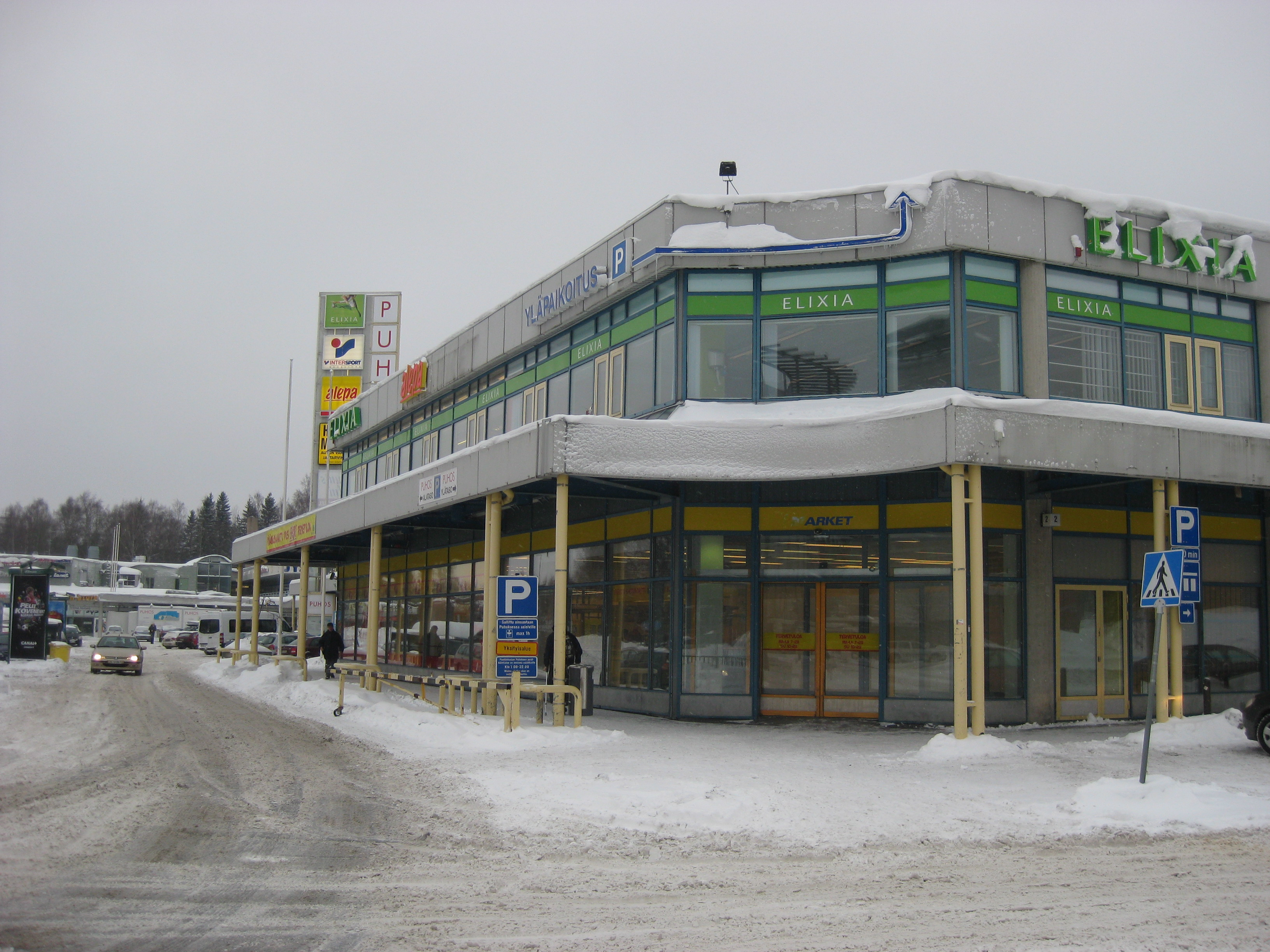
- Puotinharju's shopping centre Puhos

- Location in Helsinki
- Country: Finland
- Province: Southern Finland
- Region: Uusimaa
- Sub-region: Helsinki
- Time zone: UTC+2 (EET)
  - Summer (DST): UTC+3 (EEST)

Puotinharju (Finnish), Botbyhöjden (Swedish) is an eastern neighborhood of Helsinki, Finland. At the end of 2022, 35 percent of the residents of the Puotinharju postal code area were of foreign background.

Puotinharju is particularly well-known for the shopping centre called Puhos, which developed into an important meeting place for entrepreneurs and customers with immigrant backgrounds in the 2000s.
