= Tattariharju =

Tattariharju (in Finnish) Tattaråsen (in Swedish)
- Neighborhood of Helsinki
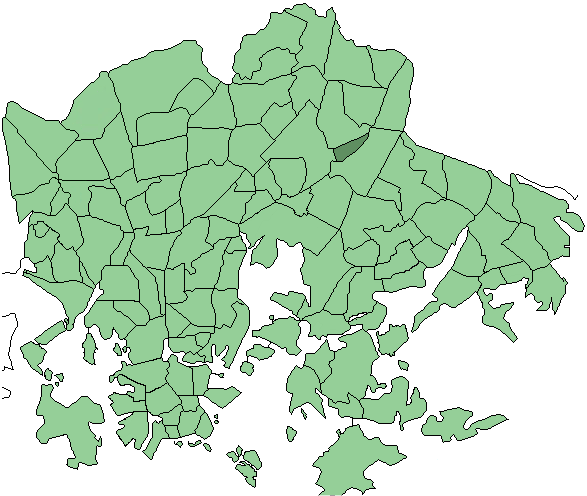
- Location in Helsinki
- Coordinates: 60.244246°N 25.046748°E
- Country: Finland
- Province: Southern Finland
- Region: Uusimaa
- Sub-region: Helsinki
- Time zone: UTC+2 (EET)
  - Summer (DST): UTC+3 (EEST)

Tattariharju, known as Tattaråsen in Swedish, is a northern neighbourhood of Helsinki, Finland.
