= Siltamäki =

Neighborhood of Helsinki, Finland

Coordinates: 60°16′N 24°59′E

Siltamäki (in Finnish) Brobacka (in Swedish)
- Neighborhood of Helsinki
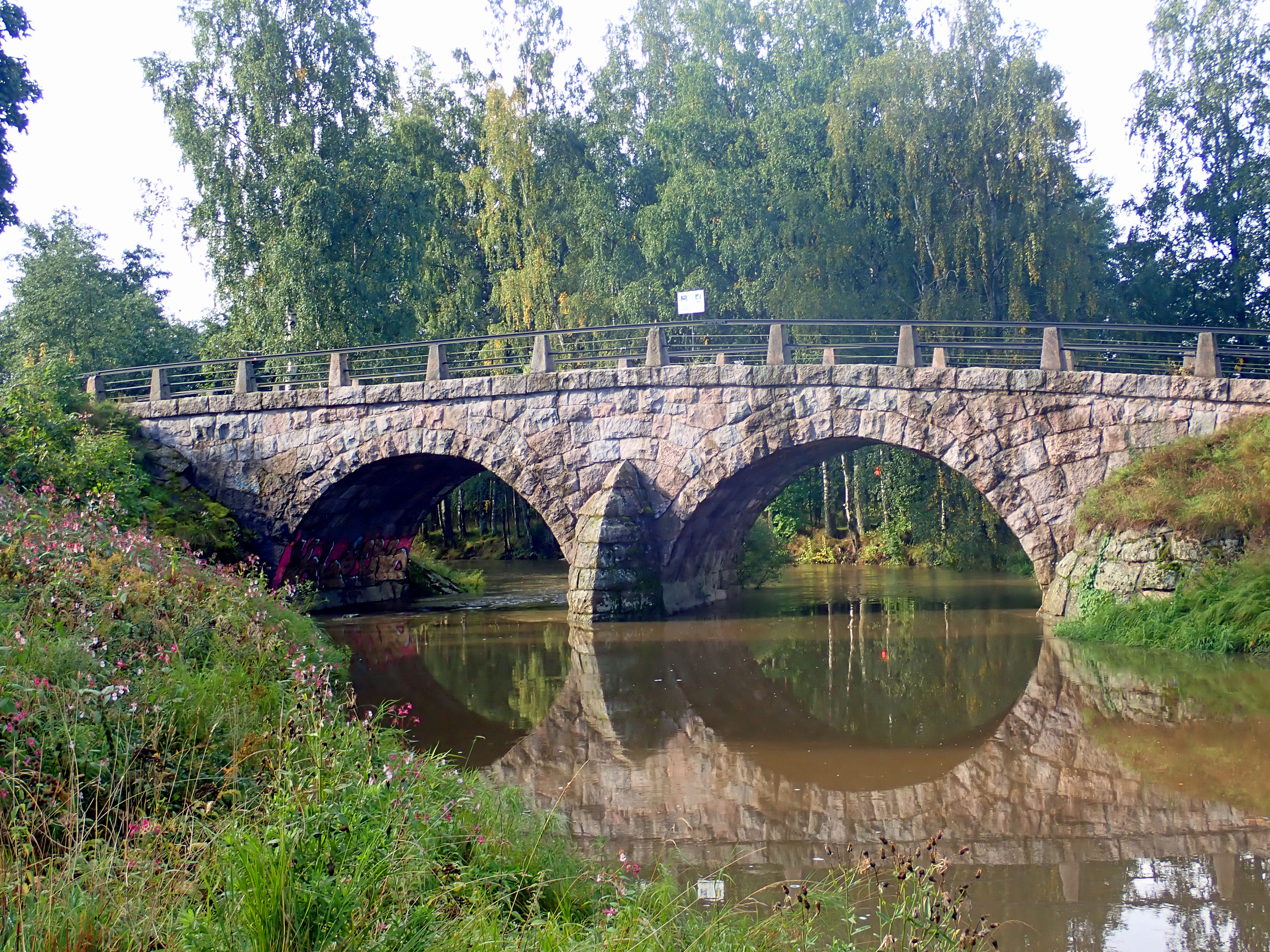
- The Brobacka Bridge runs across the Kerava River in Siltamäki.

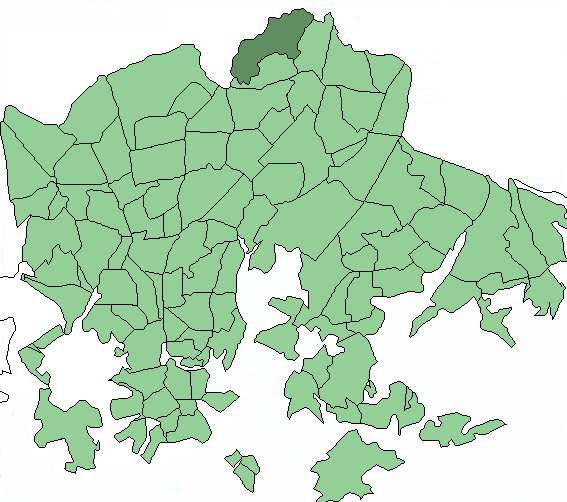
- Location in Helsinki
- Country: Finland
- Province: Southern Finland
- Region: Uusimaa
- Sub-region: Helsinki
- Time zone: UTC+2 (EET)
  - Summer (DST): UTC+3 (EEST)

Siltamäki (Finnish: [ˈsiltɑˌmæki]; Swedish: Brobacka) is a northern neighborhood of Helsinki, Finland.

Siltamäki is located next to Kerava River, which forms the border with the city of Vantaa. The first signs of human activity in Siltamäki can be traced back to 2500-2000 BC. The existing buildings are derived from much later times; 1950 -, 1960 - and 1970s. The name of the district (siltamäki, lit. 'bridge hill') comes from the Brobacka Bridge crossing the Kerava River, which separates the Siltamäki and Tammisto districts.

In Siltamäki, there is a shopping center, and in addition to shops, a swimming pool. Larger shops are located along the Ring III in Vantaa. In Siltamäki are outdoor opportunities close at hand, with recreation areas, sports fields and golf for example.
