= Tuomarinkartano =

Tuomarinkartano (in Finnish) Domargård (in Swedish)
- Neighborhood of Helsinki
- Interactive map of Tuomarinkartano (in Finnish); Domargård (in Swedish)
- Coordinates: 60.2573°N 24.9679°E
- Country: Finland
- Province: Southern Finland
- Region: Uusimaa
- Sub-region: Helsinki
- Time zone: UTC+2 (EET)
  - Summer (DST): UTC+3 (EEST)

Tuomarinkartano (Finnish), Domargård (Swedish) is a northwestern neighborhood of Helsinki, Finland.
