= Torpparinmäki =

Neighborhood in Helsinki, Finland

Coordinates: 60.26189°N 24.95217°E

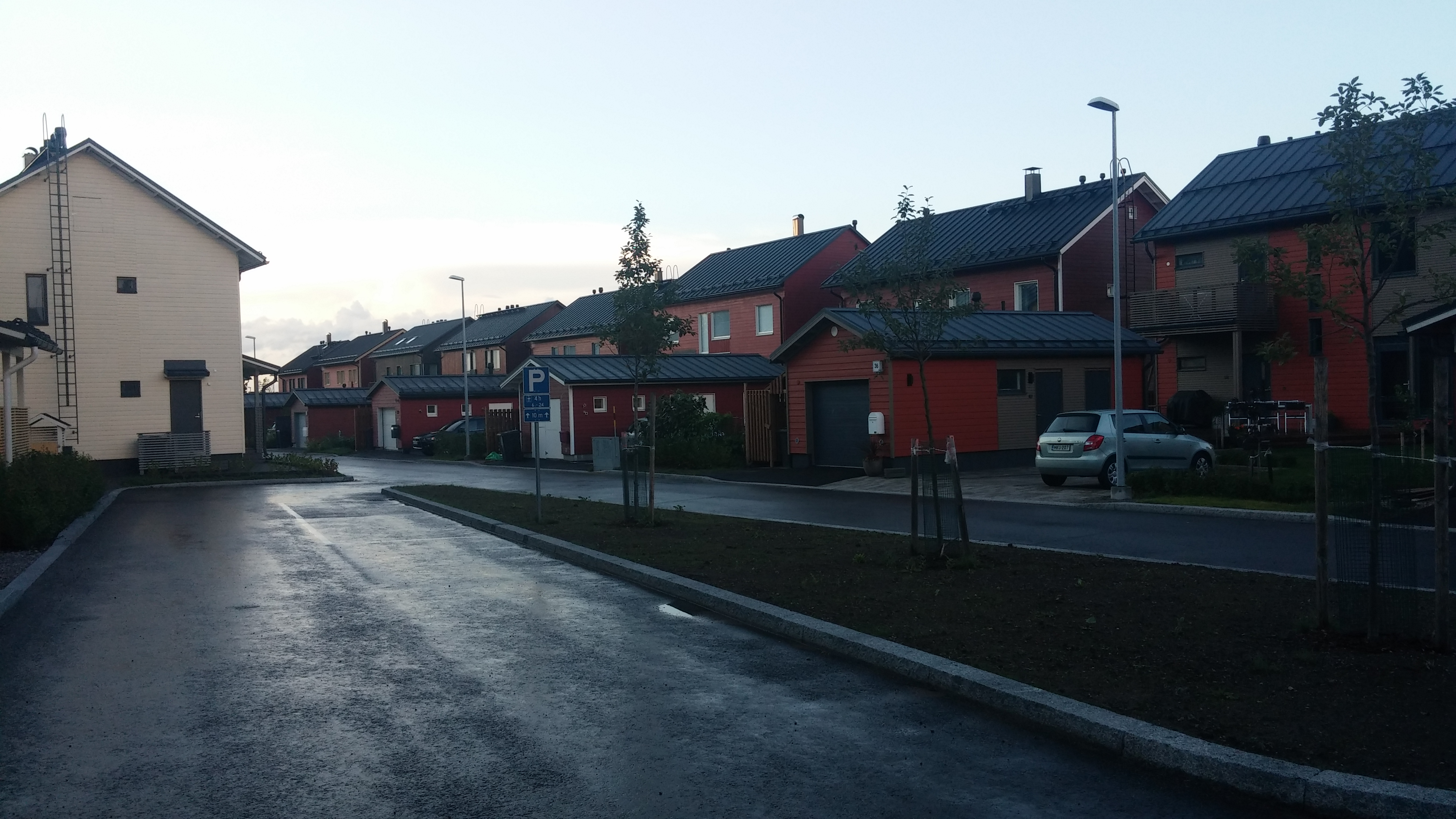
Residential houses in Torpparinmäki

Torpparinmäki (Finnish), Torparbacken (Swedish) is an area in Helsinki, Finland, and in turn part of the Greater Helsinki area. Torpparinmäki is a residential area along Tuusulanväylä, situated north of Kehä I. At the end of 2022, 2,785 inhabitants lived in the area.
