= Ylä-Malmi =

Coordinates: 60°15′N 25°01′E

Ylä-Malmi (in Finnish) Övre Malm (in Swedish)
- Neighborhood of Helsinki
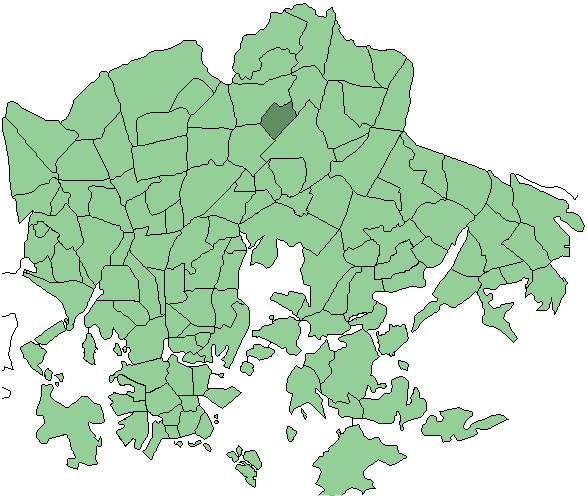
- Location in Helsinki
- Country: Finland
- Province: Southern Finland
- Region: Uusimaa
- Sub-region: Helsinki
- Time zone: UTC+2 (EET)
  - Summer (DST): UTC+3 (EEST)

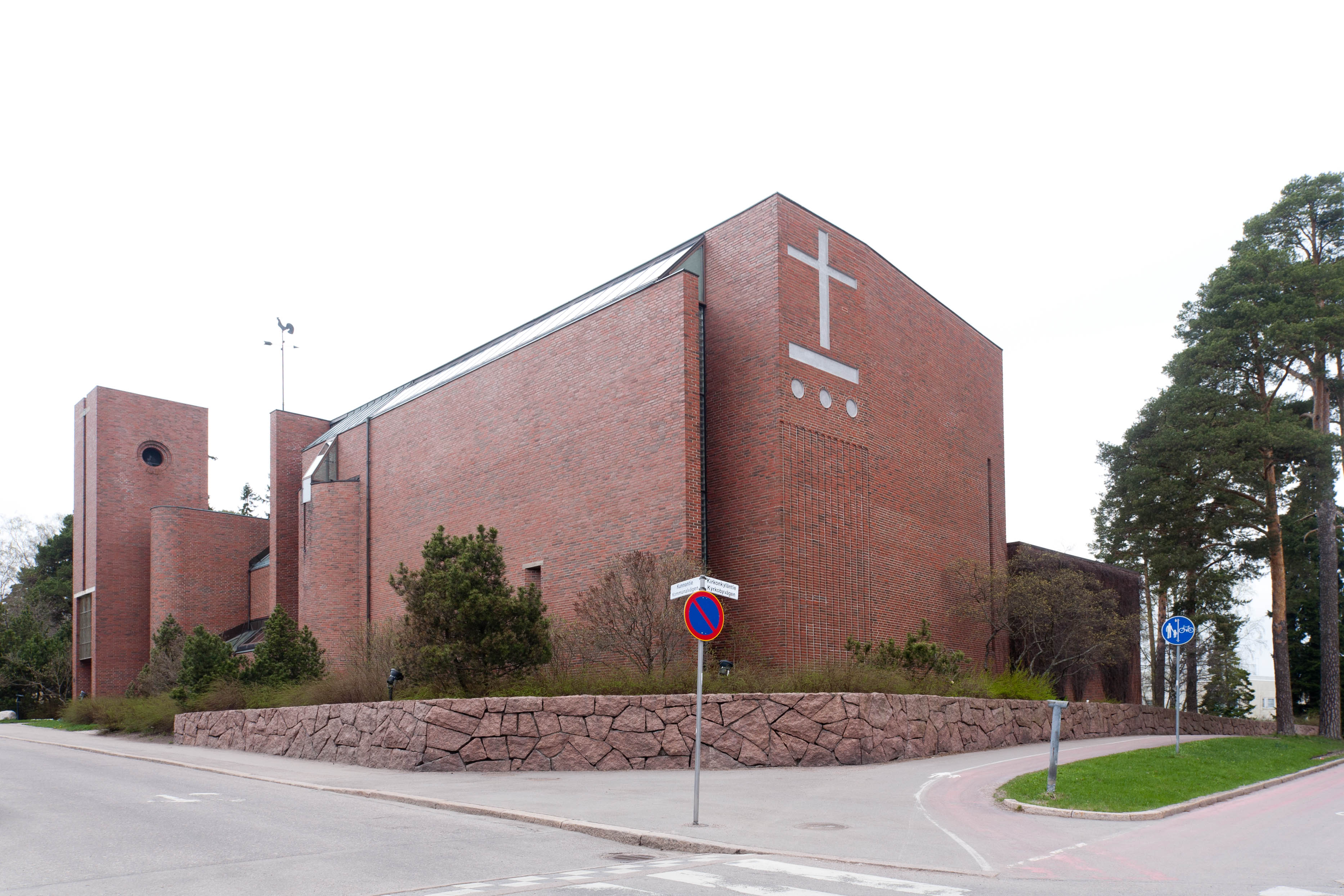
Malmi church

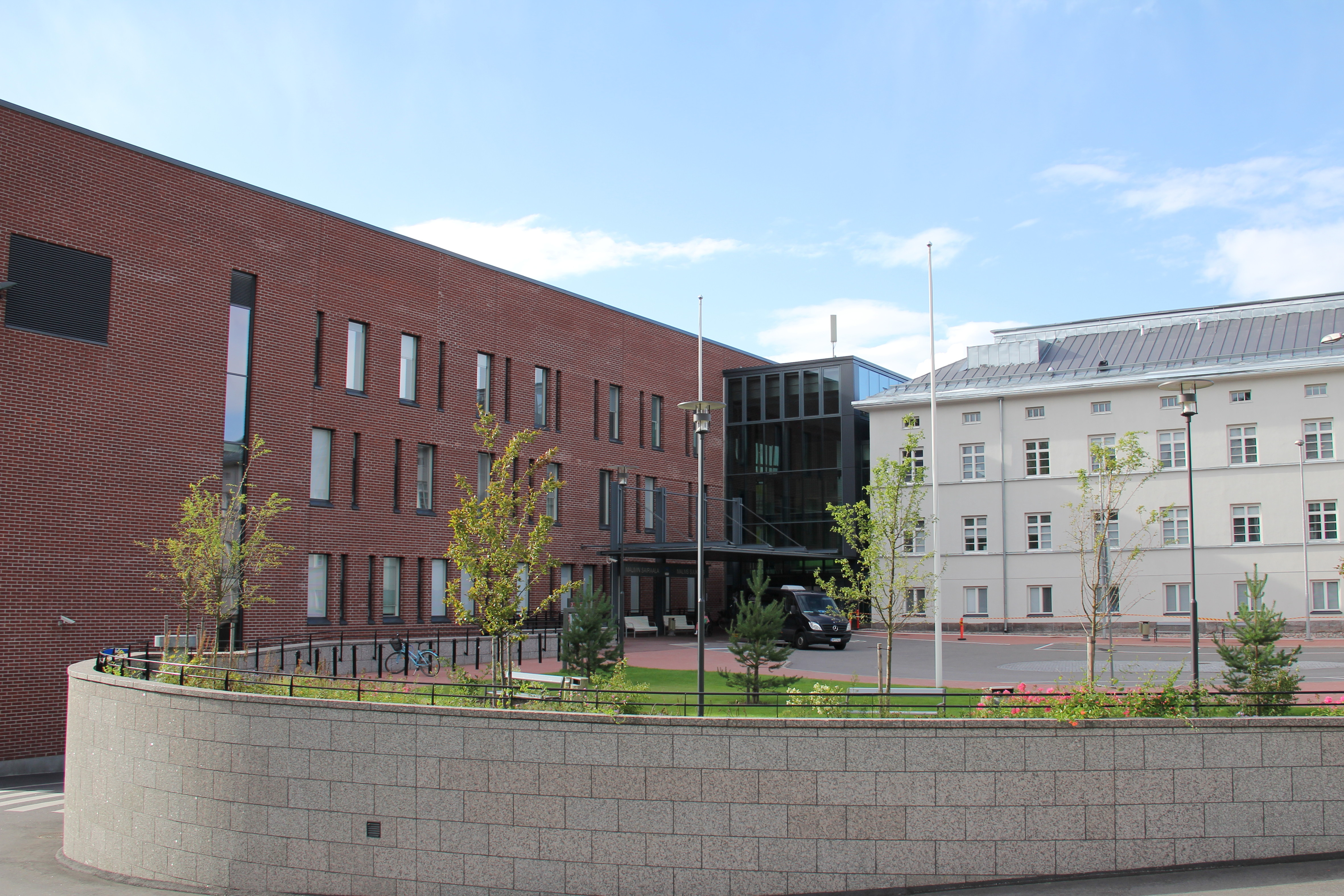
Malmi hospital

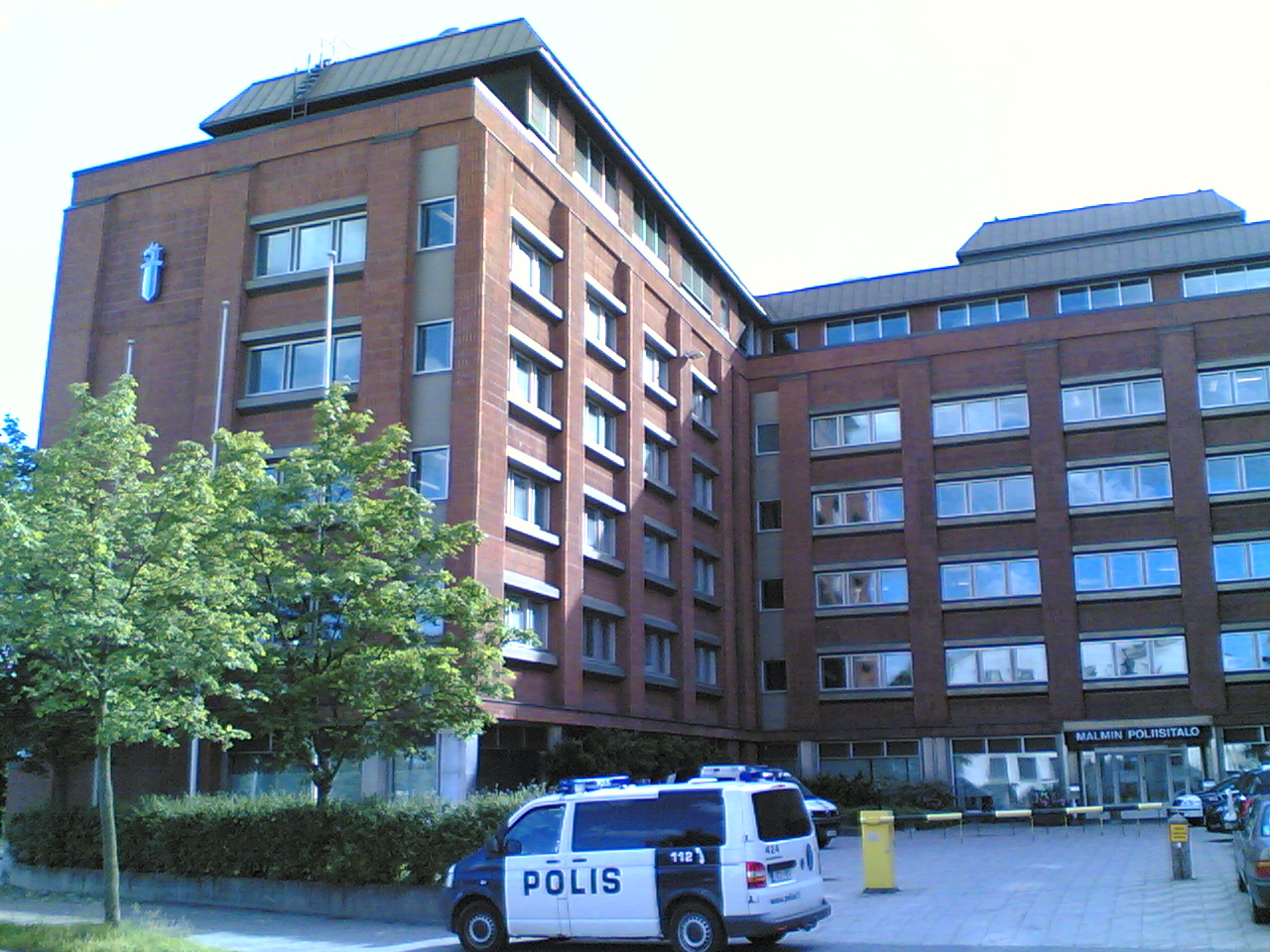
Malmi police station

Ylä-Malmi (Finnish), Övre Malm (Swedish) is a northern neighborhood of Helsinki, Finland. Many of Malmi's most important services are located on the Ylä-Malmi side, such as the church, schools, hospital and police station.

== See also ==
- Ala-Malmi
