= Ala-Malmi =

Neighborhood in Helsinki, Finland

Coordinates: 60°15′N 25°01′E

Ala-Malmi (in Finnish) Nedre Malm (in Swedish)
- Neighborhood of Helsinki
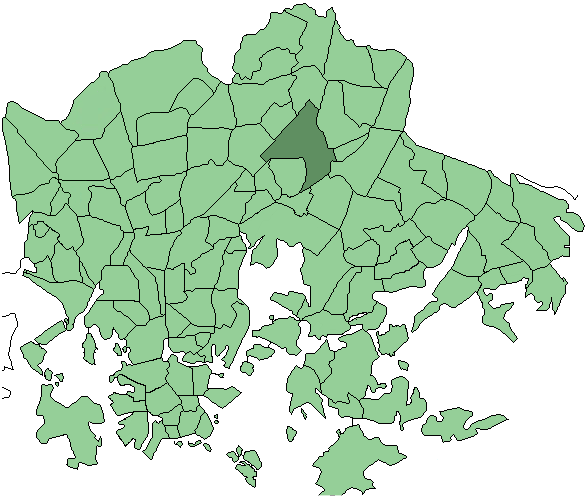
- Location in Helsinki
- Country: Finland
- Province: Southern Finland
- Region: Uusimaa
- Sub-region: Helsinki
- Time zone: UTC+2 (EET)
  - Summer (DST): UTC+3 (EEST)
- Postal code: 00700

Ala-Malmi (Finnish), Nedre Malm (Swedish) is a northern-central neighborhood of Helsinki, Finland.

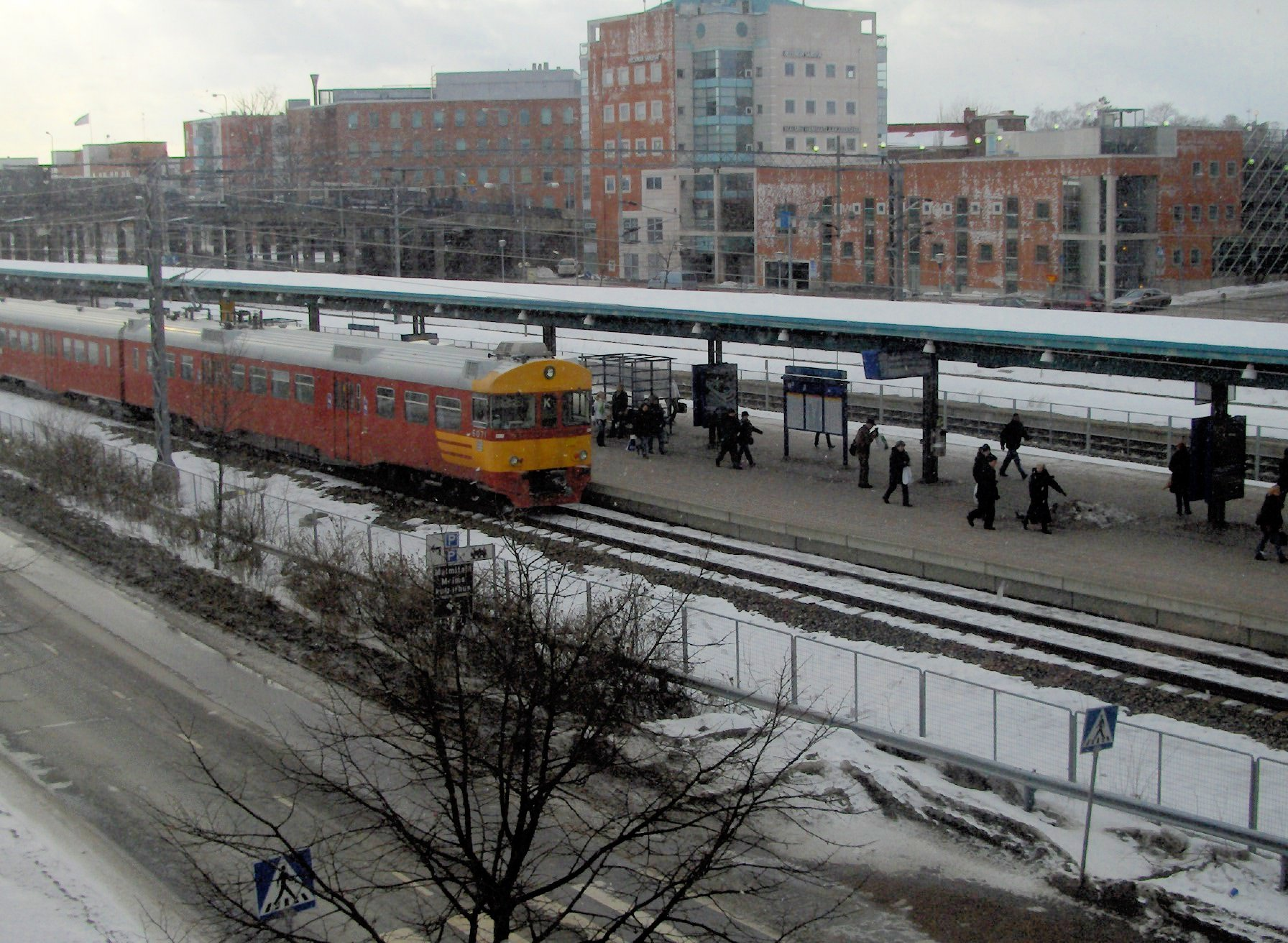
Malmi railway station

About five and a half thousand people live in Ala-Malmi. In 2003, the area provided jobs for 4,345 people. The services of the area include Malmitalo cultural center and library, an indoor swimming pool, social services department office, several nurseries, schools and vocational schools, such as Haaga-Helia University of Applied Sciences.

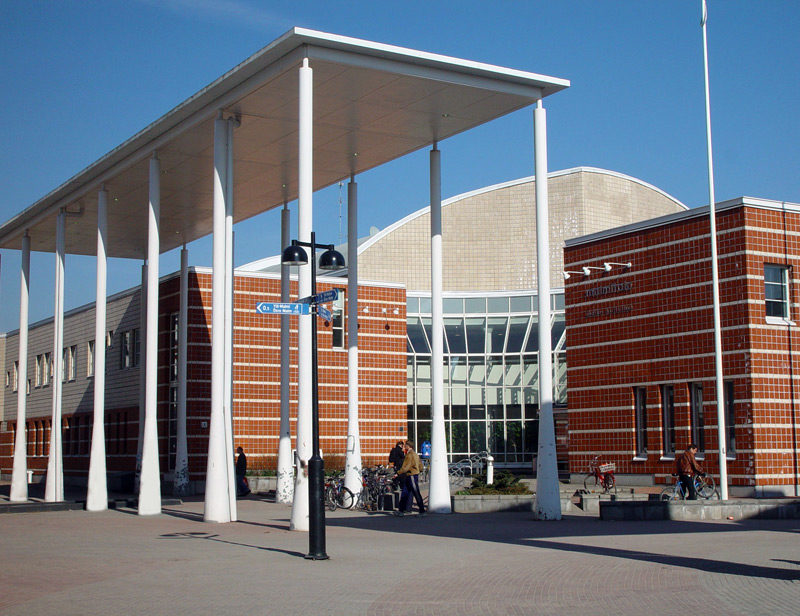
Malmitalo cultural center

In the southern part of the area, near Ring I, is the Malmi cemetery which was founded in 1890.

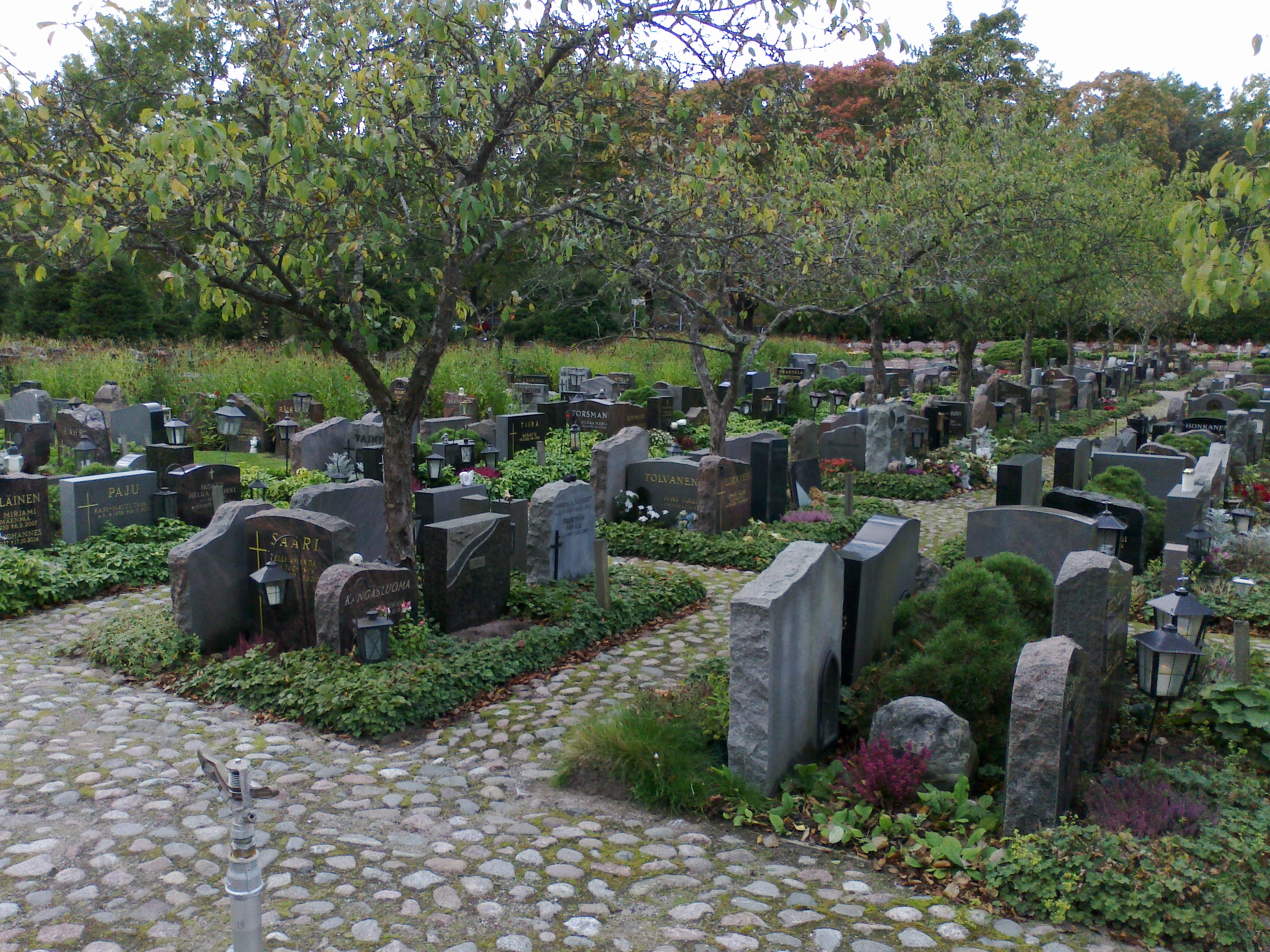
The Malmi cemetery

== See also ==
- Ylä-Malmi
