= Itä-Pakila =

Itä-Pakila (in Finnish) Östra Baggböle (in Swedish)
- Neighborhood of Helsinki
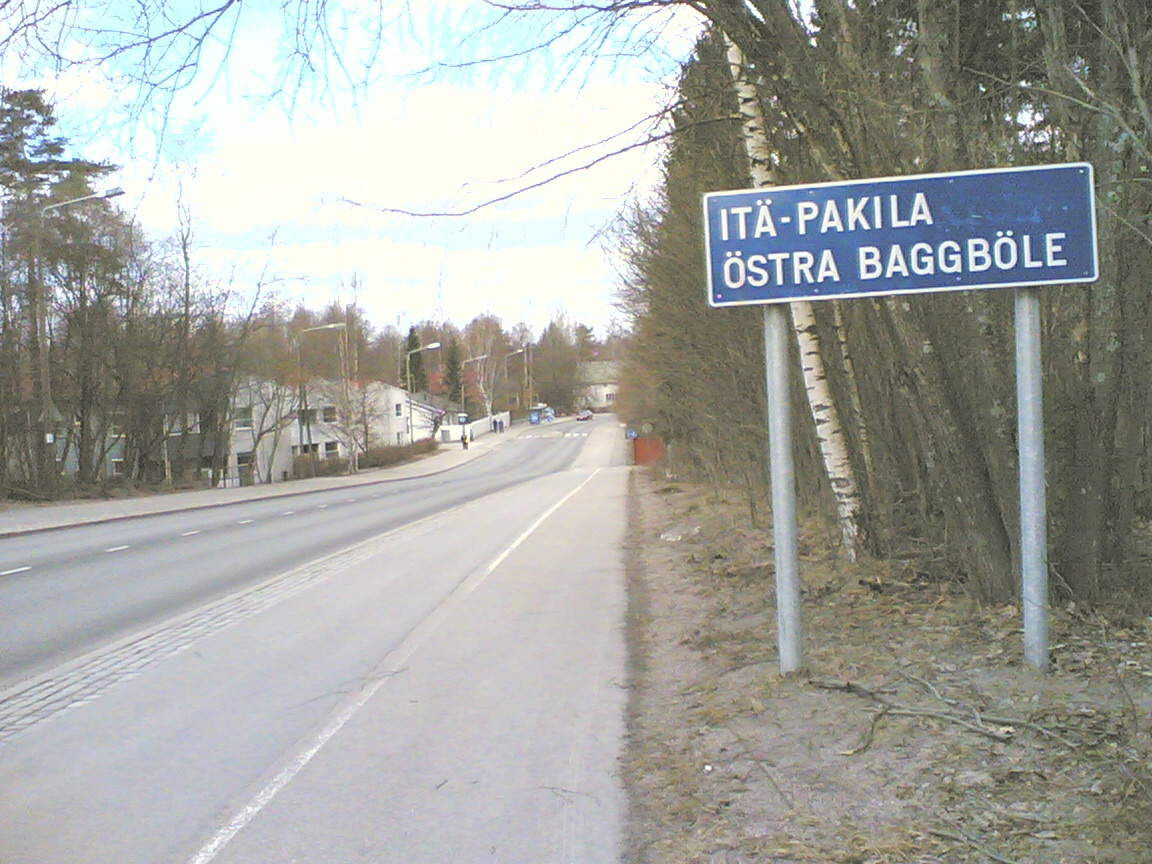
- Itä-Pakila Helsinki
- Interactive map of Itä-Pakila (in Finnish); Östra Baggböle (in Swedish)
- Coordinates: 60.243075°N 24.959168°E
- Country: Finland
- Province: Southern Finland
- Region: Uusimaa
- Sub-region: Helsinki
- Time zone: UTC+2 (EET)
  - Summer (DST): UTC+3 (EEST)

Itä-Pakila (Finnish), Östra Baggböle (Swedish) is a northwestern neighborhood of Helsinki, Finland.
