= Western major district of Helsinki =

Major district of Helsinki, Finland

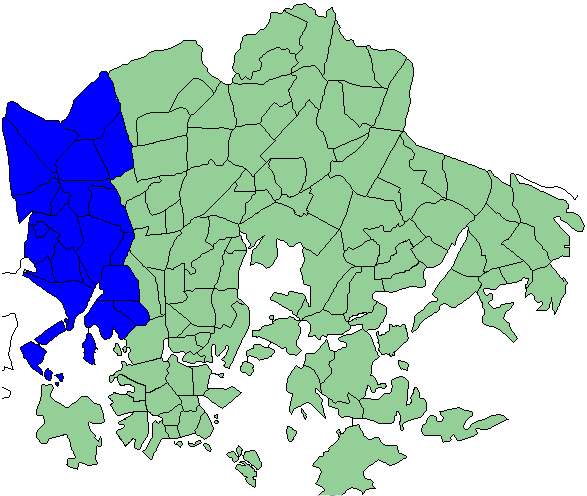
Districts of Helsinki. Western major district highlighted

Läntinen suurpiiri (Swedish: Västra stordistriktet, English: Western major district) is one of the seven major districts of Helsinki, Finland. It covers five subdistricts: Reijola, Munkkiniemi, Haaga, Pitäjänmäki and Kaarela. As of 2005, western major district has 98,545 inhabitants living in an area of 30.4 km^{2}.

Each of the five districts has several subareas:

- Reijola district
  - Laakso
  - Ruskeasuo
  - Meilahti
- Munkkiniemi district
  - Niemenmäki
  - Munkkivuori
  - Talinranta
  - Vanha Munkkiniemi
  - Kuusisaari
  - Lehtisaari
- Haaga district
  - Etelä-Haaga
  - Kivihaka
  - Pohjois-Haaga
  - Lassila
- Pitäjänmäki district
  - Tali
  - Pajamäki
  - Pitäjänmäen teollisuusalue
  - Reimarla
  - Marttila
  - Konala
- Kaarela district
  - Kannelmäki
  - Malminkartano
  - Maununneva
  - Hakuninmaa
