= Kaarela =

Kaarela Kårböle
- Helsinki Subdivision
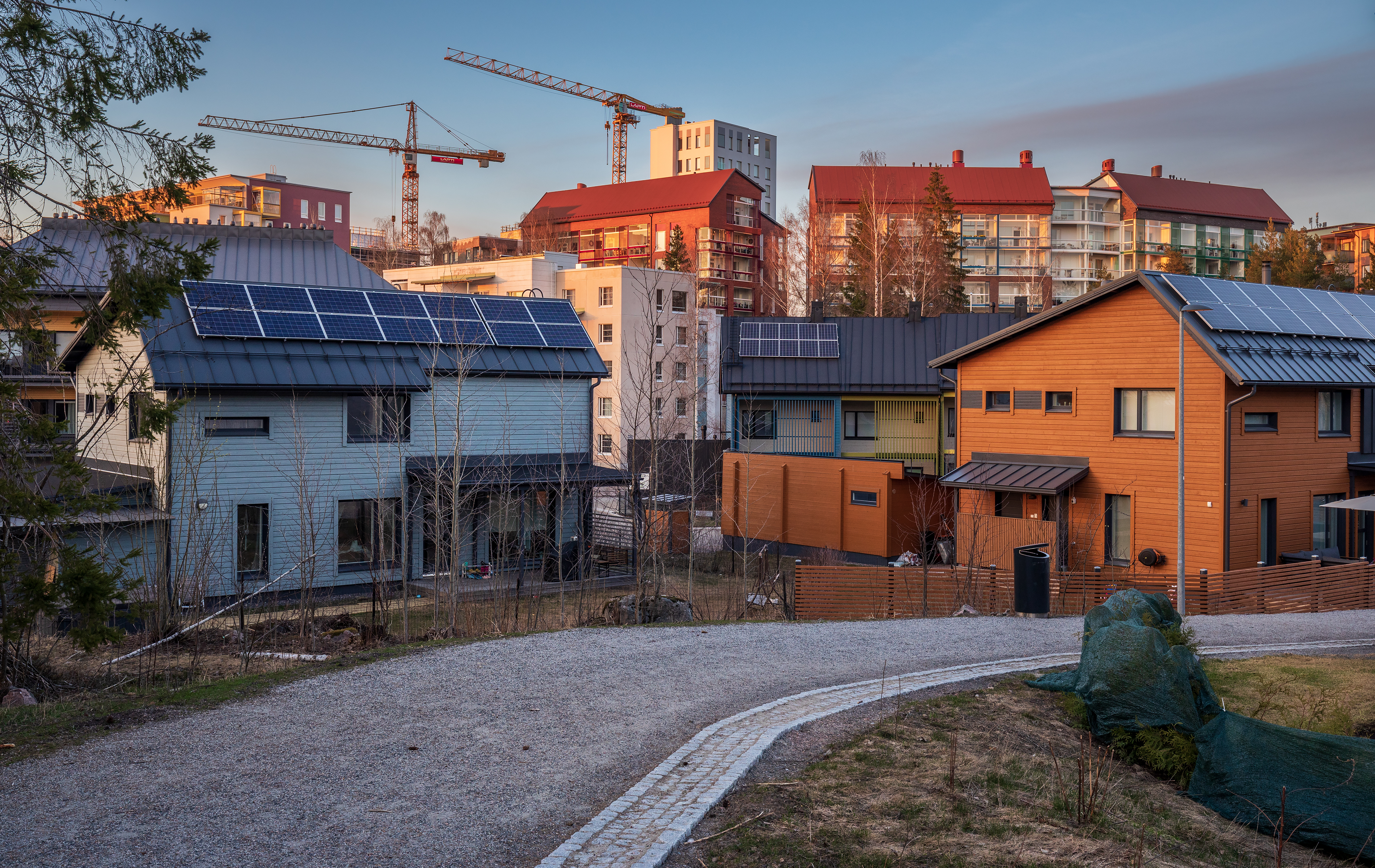

- Position of Kaarela within Helsinki
- Coordinates: 60°15′N 24°53′E
- Country: Finland
- Region: Uusimaa
- Sub-region: Greater Helsinki
- Municipality: Helsinki
- District: Western
- Subdivision regions: Kannelmäki, Maununneva, Malminkartano, Hakuninmaa
- Area: 9.46 km^{2} (3.65 sq mi)
- Population: 26,414
  - Density: 2,792/km^{2} (7,230/sq mi)
- Postal codes: 00410, 00420, 00430
- Subdivision number: 33
- Neighbouring subdivisions: Oulunkylä, Haaga, Konala, Pakila, Tuomarinkylä, Pitäjänmäki

Kaarela (Swedish: Kårböle) is a subdistrict in the Western major district of Helsinki, Finland.

Kaarela is split into four subareas: Kannelmäki (12,569 inhabitants), Maununneva (2,501 inhabitants), Malminkartano (8,538 inhabitants) and Hakuninmaa (2,870 inhabitants) and has a total population of 26,414.
