= Haaga =

District of Helsinki, Finland

Haaga Haga
- Helsinki Subdivision; Former municipality
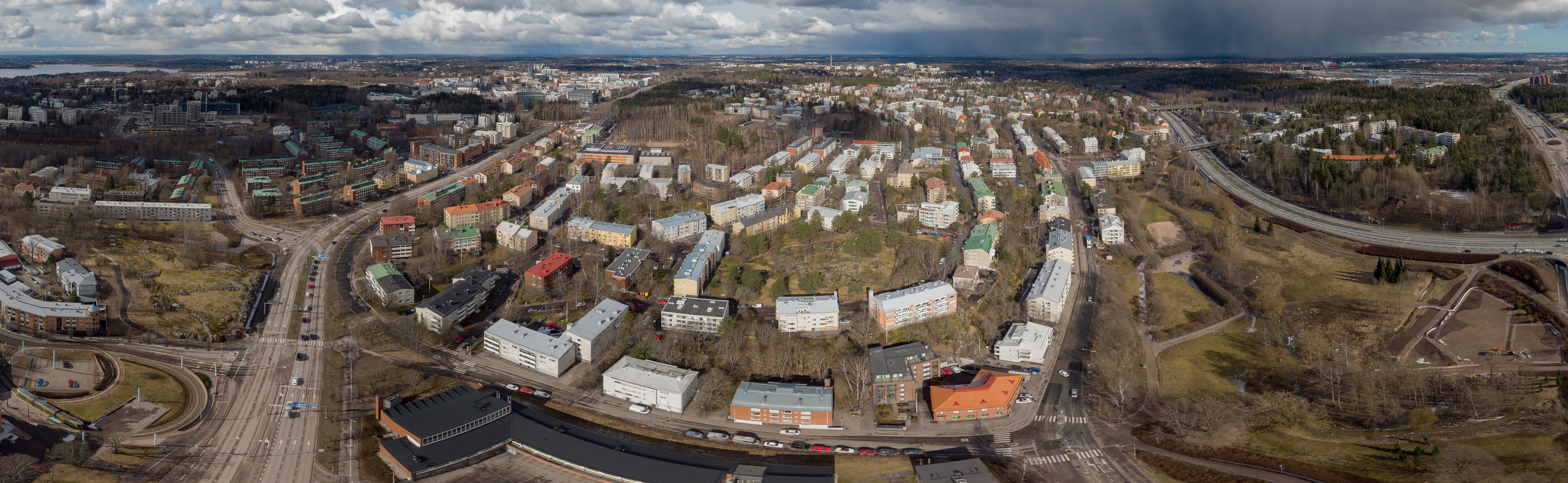
- Panoramic view from southern Haaga.

- Location of Haaga district in Helsinki.

- Location of Haaga municipality in Finland (1935).
- Interactive map of Haaga district
- Location within Uusimaa Location within Finland Location within Europe
- Country: Finland
- Province: Uusimaa Province
- Region: Uusimaa
- Municipality: Helsinki
- District: Western
- Established from Huopalahti: 1923
- Merged to Helsinki: 1946
- Subdivision regions: Etelä-Haaga, Kivihaka, Pohjois-Haaga, Lassila
- Postal codes: 00300, 00310, 00320, 00350, 00400, 00440
- Subdivision number: 29

Haaga (Swedish: Haga) is a district and a former municipality in the Western major district of Helsinki with a population of 25,435.

== Municipality of Haaga ==
Official name for the municipality was Haagan kauppala (Swedish: Haga köping) and it was consolidated to Helsinki in 1946. It's neighbouring municipalities were Huopalahti to the east and west, Oulunkylä to the east, Helsingin maalaiskunta to the north and Helsinki to the south.

As an independent municipality Haaga was smaller than the modern day district of Helsinki. Its land area was 3.78 km^{2} (c. 1.46 sq mi) in 1945 and about 3,000 inhabitants lived in the municipality before the merger.

== District of Helsinki ==
Haaga is divided into four subareas, which are Pohjois-Haaga (northern Haaga), Etelä-Haaga (southern Haaga), Kivihaka and Lassila. Land area of the Haaga district is 5.32 km^{2} (c. 2.05 sq mi) as of 2014. It is home to the Haaga Rhododendron Park.

Haaga has two railway stations: Huopalahti railway station in south and Pohjois-Haaga railway station in north. Frequent users of the trains are students attending Haaga-Helia University of Applied Sciences, as their campuses are spread out between 25 and 45 minutes between each other by train.

Studies at the university include: business, finance, hospitality and tourism (including masters level), information technology, and management assistance. All these courses are available to exchange students interested in attending.

== See also ==
- Haaga Rhododendron Park
- Pitäjänmäki
- Pasila
