= Hakuninmaa =

Coordinates: 60°15′N 24°53′E

Hakuninmaa Håkansåker
- Helsinki Subdivision
- Position of Hakuninmaa within Helsinki
- Country: Finland
- Region: Uusimaa
- Sub-region: Greater Helsinki
- Municipality: Helsinki
- District: Western
- Subdivision regions: is a quarter of the Kaarela neighbourhood
- Area: 262 km^{2} (101 sq mi)
- Population: 2 880
  - Density: 1/km^{2} (2.6/sq mi)
- Postal codes: 00430, 00431
- Subdivision number: 334
- Neighbouring subdivisions: Malminkartano, Vantaa, Haltiala, Maununneva, Kannelmäki

Hakuninmaa (Finnish), Håkansåker (Swedish) is a quarter of Helsinki, Finland.

Hakuninmaa is a neighbourhood in Kaarela. It's located next to Kannelmäki and Maununneva.

Kehä 1 and Hämeenlinnanväylä are two of the biggest motorways near Hakuninmaa.

There's a kindergarten in Hakuninmaa called "Päiväkoti Hakuninmaa".

Hakuninmaa is famous for its beautiful forests, especially the area near Paloheinä.

Nicknames for Hakuninmaa: Håkansåker (Swedish) Hakuninmaa (Finnish) Hakkari (Slang)
