= Kannelmäki =

Kannelmäki Gamlas
- Helsinki Subdivision
- Position of Kannelmäki within Helsinki
- Coordinates: 60°14′39″N 024°52′59″E
- Country: Finland
- Region: Uusimaa
- Sub-region: Greater Helsinki
- Municipality: Helsinki
- District: Western
- Subdivision regions: Is a quarter of the Kaarela neighbourhood
- Area: 1.98 km^{2} (0.76 sq mi)
- Population (2018): 13,272
  - Density: 6,307/km^{2} (16,340/sq mi)
- Postal codes: 00420
- Subdivision number: 331
- Neighbouring subdivisions: Malminkartano, Hakuninmaa, Maununneva, Pirkkola, Lassila, Pohjois-Haaga, Konala

Kannelmäki (Swedish: Gamlas, Helsinki slang: Kantsu) is a sub-neighbourhood of the neighbourhood of Kaarela in Helsinki, Finland. Kannelmäki is located a bit more than ten kilometres from the centre of Helsinki, and is bounded by Kehä I ring road in the south, Hämeenlinnanväylä in the east, and the Mätäjoki river in the west and north. It is a part of the Western major district. In 2018, Kannelmäki had 13,272 inhabitants.

The streets in Kannelmäki are named after music and villages in Ostrobothnia. The area was originally named Vanhainen – Gamlas, which comes from the village of Gamlas originally located at the site, and its Finnish translation. Because of the wishes of the local inhabitants, the name was changed to Kannelmäki – Gamlas in 1959. The singular church of Kannelmäki was completed in 1968.

Services in Kannelmäki are concentrated in the shopping centre designed by Erkki Karvinen and opened in 1959, the Prisma hypermarket building (originally opened in 1973 as Eka-Market, then as Maxi) and the surroundings of the Kannelmäki railway station. Prisma was expanded into a larger complex called the Shopping Centre Kaari in October 2013, now containing a department store, a restaurant area and about 80 specialty stores. It is the fifth largest shopping centre in the Greater Helsinki area and the ninth largest in Finland.

The Kannelmäki railway station is one of the stations on the Ring Rail Line. It is located next to the cultural centre Kanneltalo.
