= Hill =

Landform that extends above the surrounding terrain

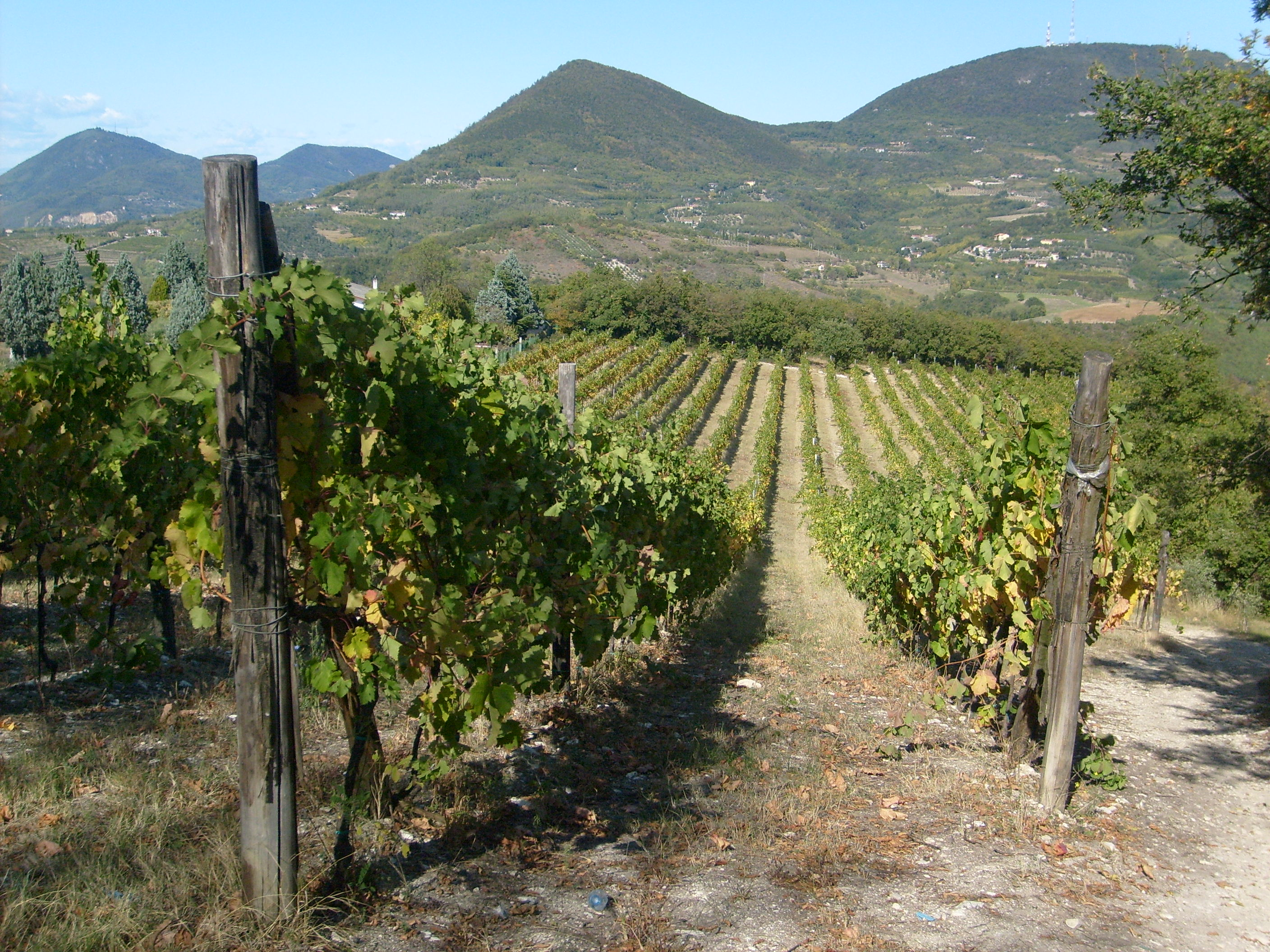
Euganean Hills in Italy

A hill is a landform that extends above the surrounding terrain. It often has a distinct summit, and is usually applied to peaks which are above elevation compared to the relative landmass, though not as prominent as mountains. Hills fall under the category of slope landforms.

== Terminology ==
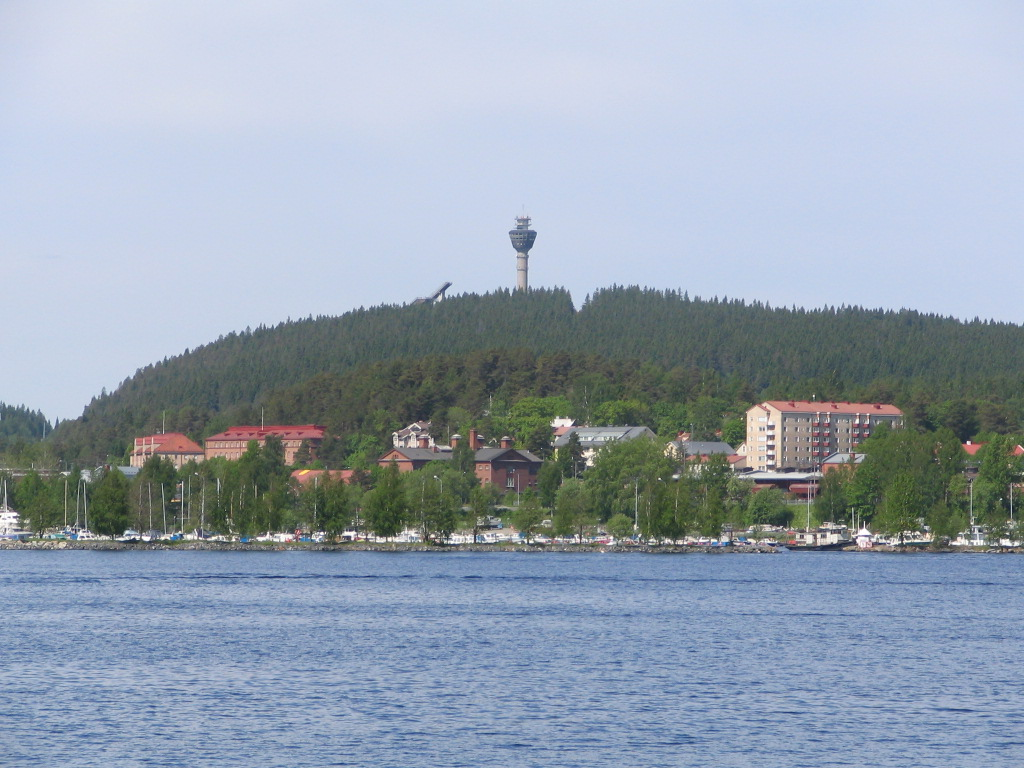
Puijo Hill in Kuopio, Finland

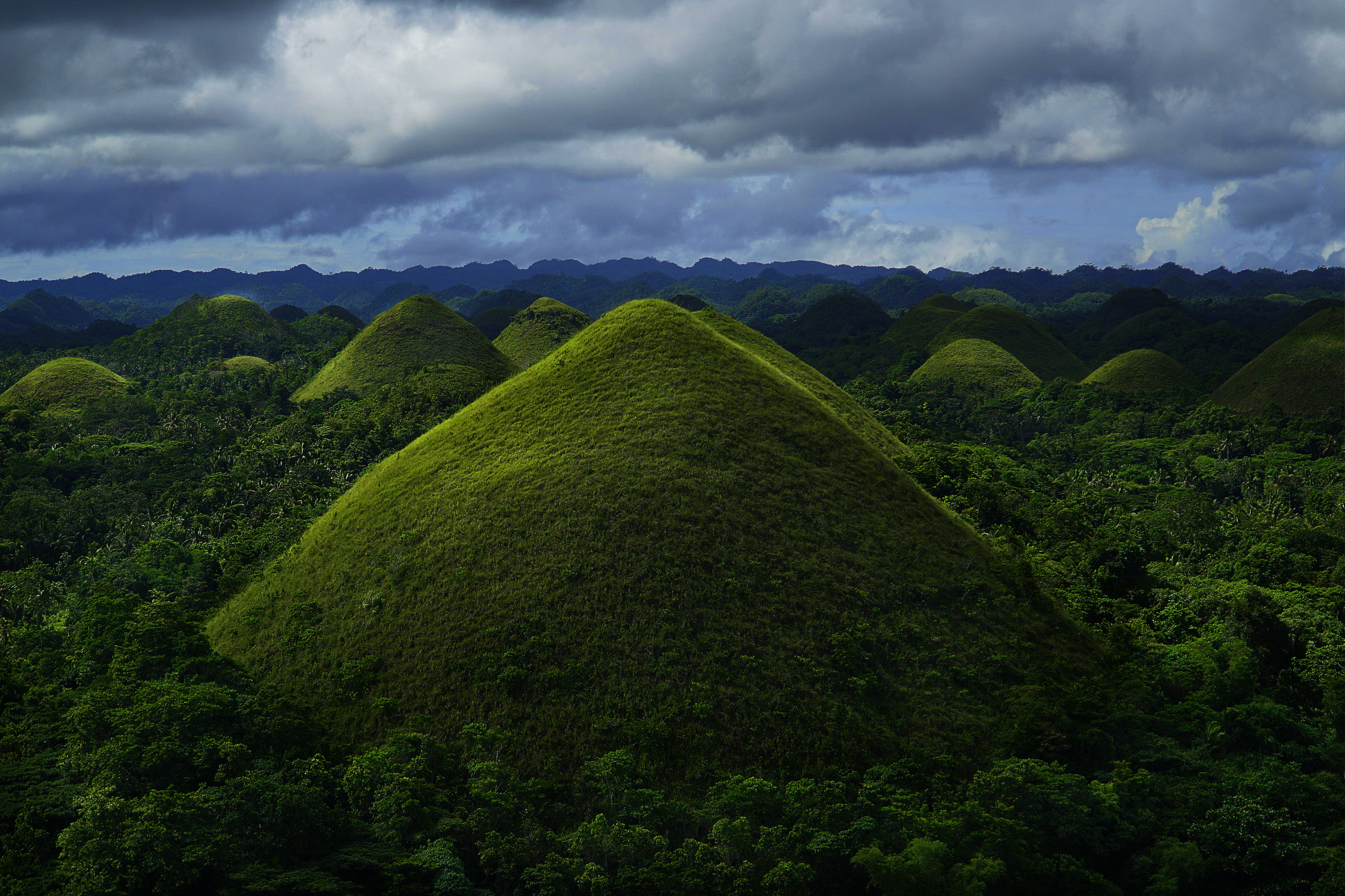
Chocolate Hills of the Philippines

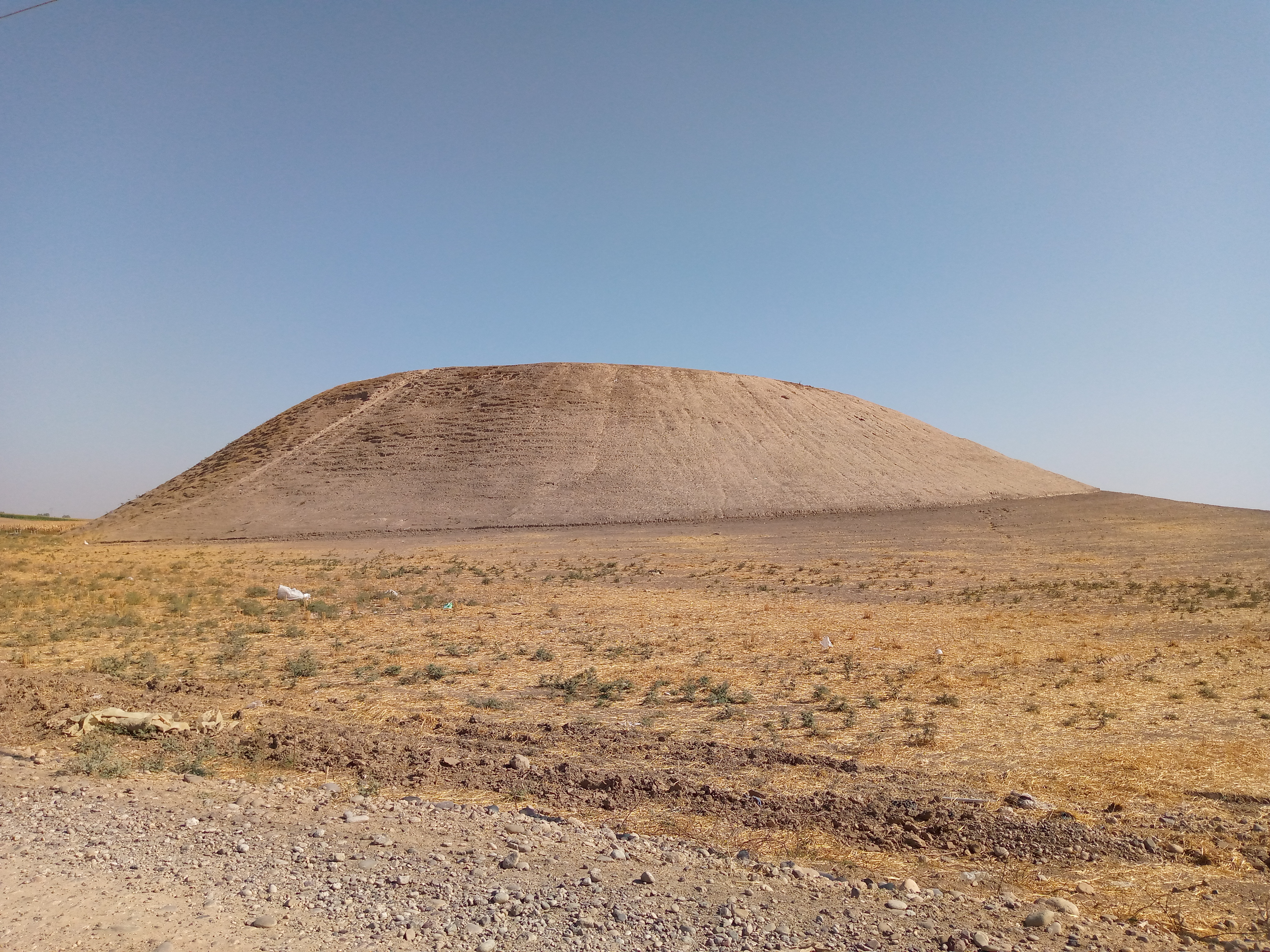
Hill of Aliawa in Erbil Governorate, Kurdistan Region

The distinction between a hill and a mountain is unclear and largely subjective, but a hill is universally considered to be not as tall, or as steep as a mountain.

Geographers historically regarded mountains as hills greater than 1,000 feet (304.8 meters) above sea level. In contrast, hillwalkers have tended to regard mountains as peaks 2,000 feet (610 m) above sea level. The Oxford English Dictionary also suggests a limit of 2,000 feet (610 m) and Whittow states "Some authorities regard eminences above 600 m (1,969 ft) as mountains, those below being referred to as hills." Today, a mountain is usually defined in the UK and Ireland as any summit at least 2,000 feet or 610 meters high, while the UK government's Countryside and Rights of Way Act 2000 defined mountainous areas (for the purposes of open access legislation) as areas above 600 meters (1,969 feet). Some definitions include a topographical prominence requirement, typically 100 feet (30.5 m) or 500 feet (152.4 m). In practice, mountains in Scotland are frequently referred to as "hills" no matter what their height, as reflected in names such as the Cuillin Hills and the Torridon Hills. In Wales, the distinction is more a term of land use and appearance and has nothing to do with height.

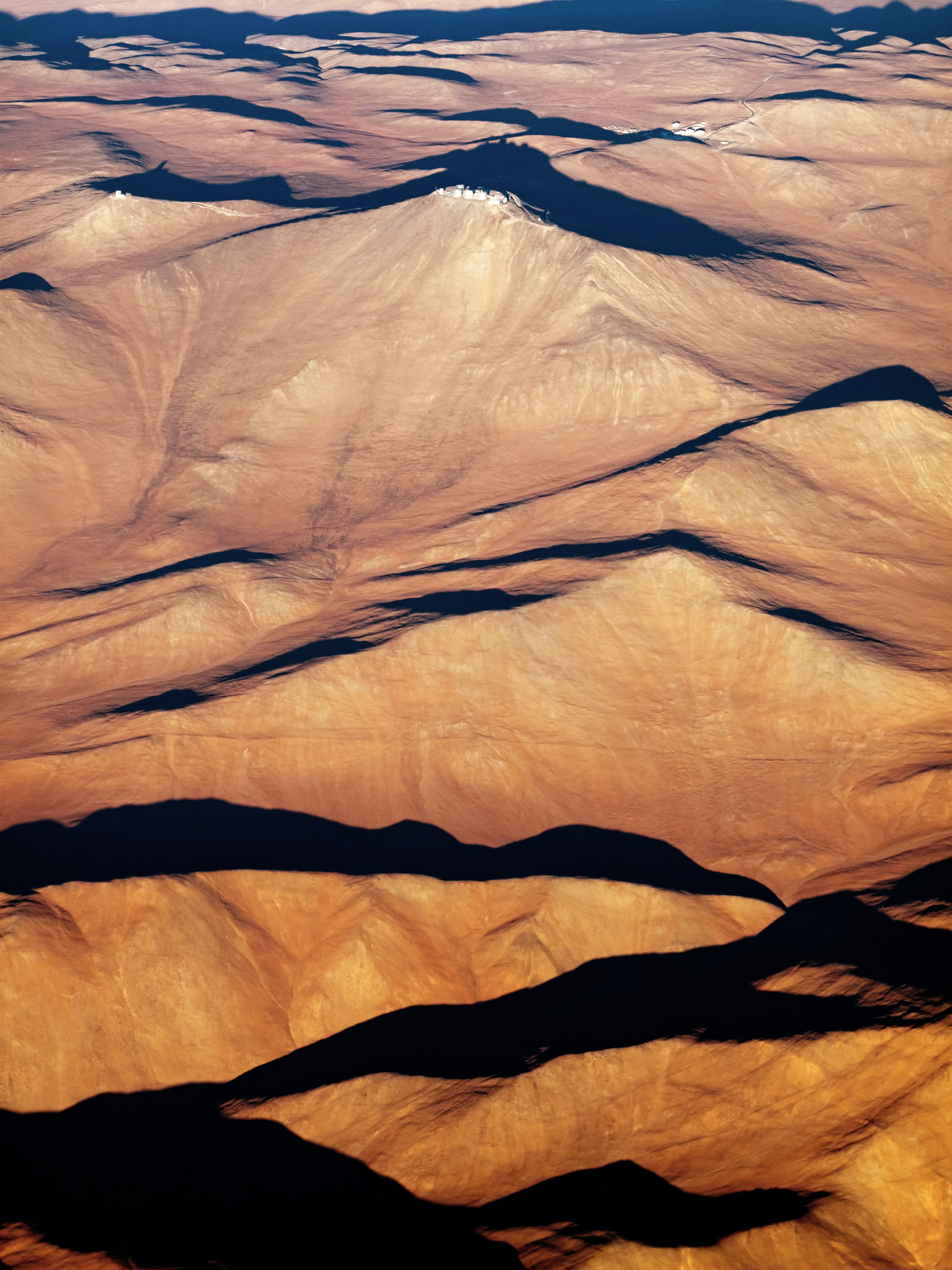
Rolling Hills Paranal

For a while, the US defined a mountain as being 1,000 feet (304.8 m) or more tall. Any similar landform lower than this height was considered a hill. The United States Geological Survey, however, has concluded that these terms do not in fact have technical definitions in the US.

The Great Soviet Encyclopedia defined "hill" as an upland with a relative height of up to 200 m (660 ft).

A hillock is a small hill. Other words include knoll and (in Scotland, Northern Ireland and northern England) its variant, knowe. Artificial hills may be referred to by a variety of technical names, including mound and tumulus.

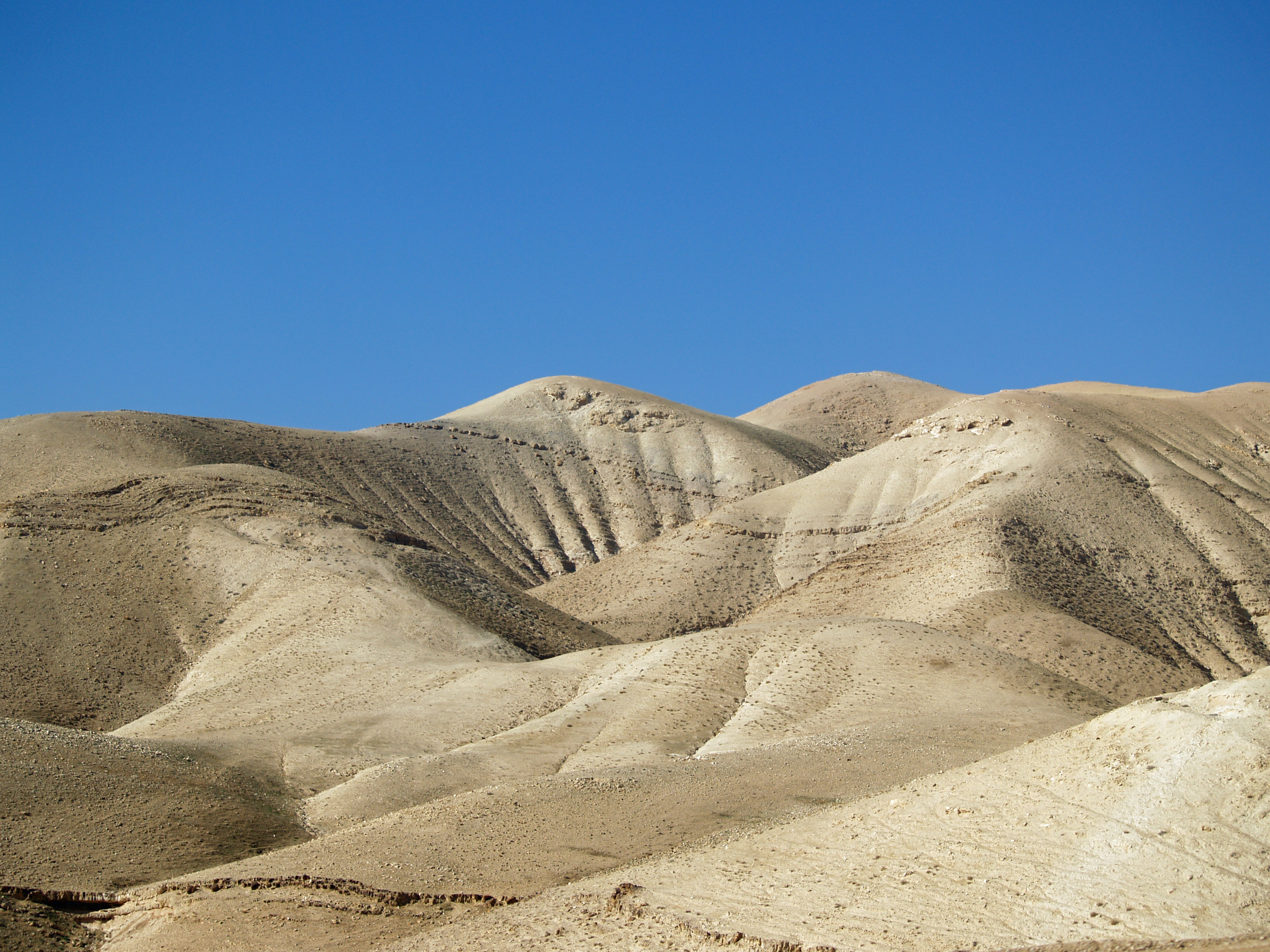
Hills of the Judean Desert

Hills may form through geomorphic phenomena: faulting, erosion of larger landforms such as mountains and movement and deposition of sediment by glaciers (notably moraines and drumlins or by erosion exposing solid rock which then weathers down into a hill). The rounded peaks of hills results from the diffusive movement of soil and regolith covering the hill, a process known as downhill creep.

Various names may be used to describe types of hills, based on appearance and method of formation. Many such names originated in one geographical region to describe a type of hill formation particular to that region, though the names are often adopted by geologists and used in a wider geographical context. These include:

- Brae – Scots, Ulster, and North of England term for a hillside or brow of a hill.
- Drumlin – an elongated whale-shaped hill formed by glacial action.
- Butte – an isolated hill with steep sides and a small flat top, formed by weathering.
- Kuppe – a rounded hill or low mountain, typical of Central Europe.
- Tor – a rock formation found on a hilltop; also used to refer to the hill, especially in South West England and the Peak District.
- Puy – used especially in the Auvergne, France, to describe a conical volcanic hill.
- Pingo – a mound of earth-covered ice found in the Arctic and Antarctica.

== Historical significance ==
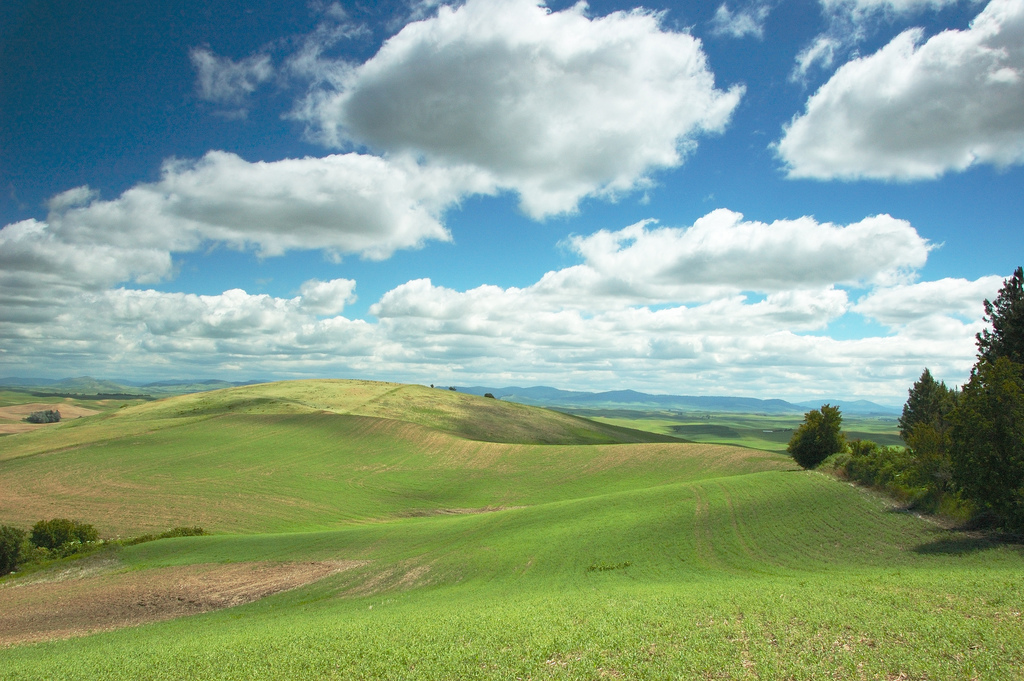
Clouds over hills in Steptoe, Washington

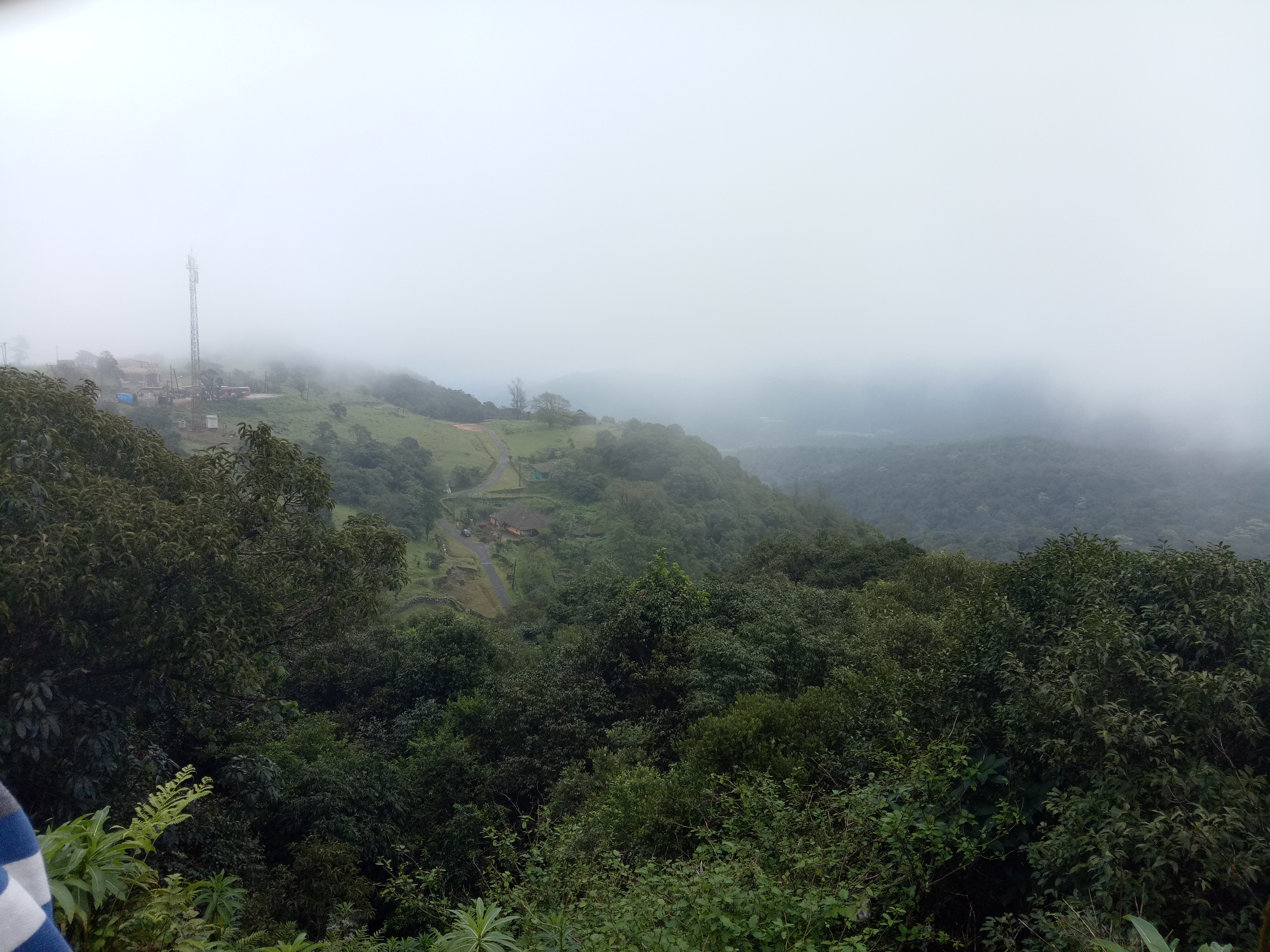
Hill in Mysore

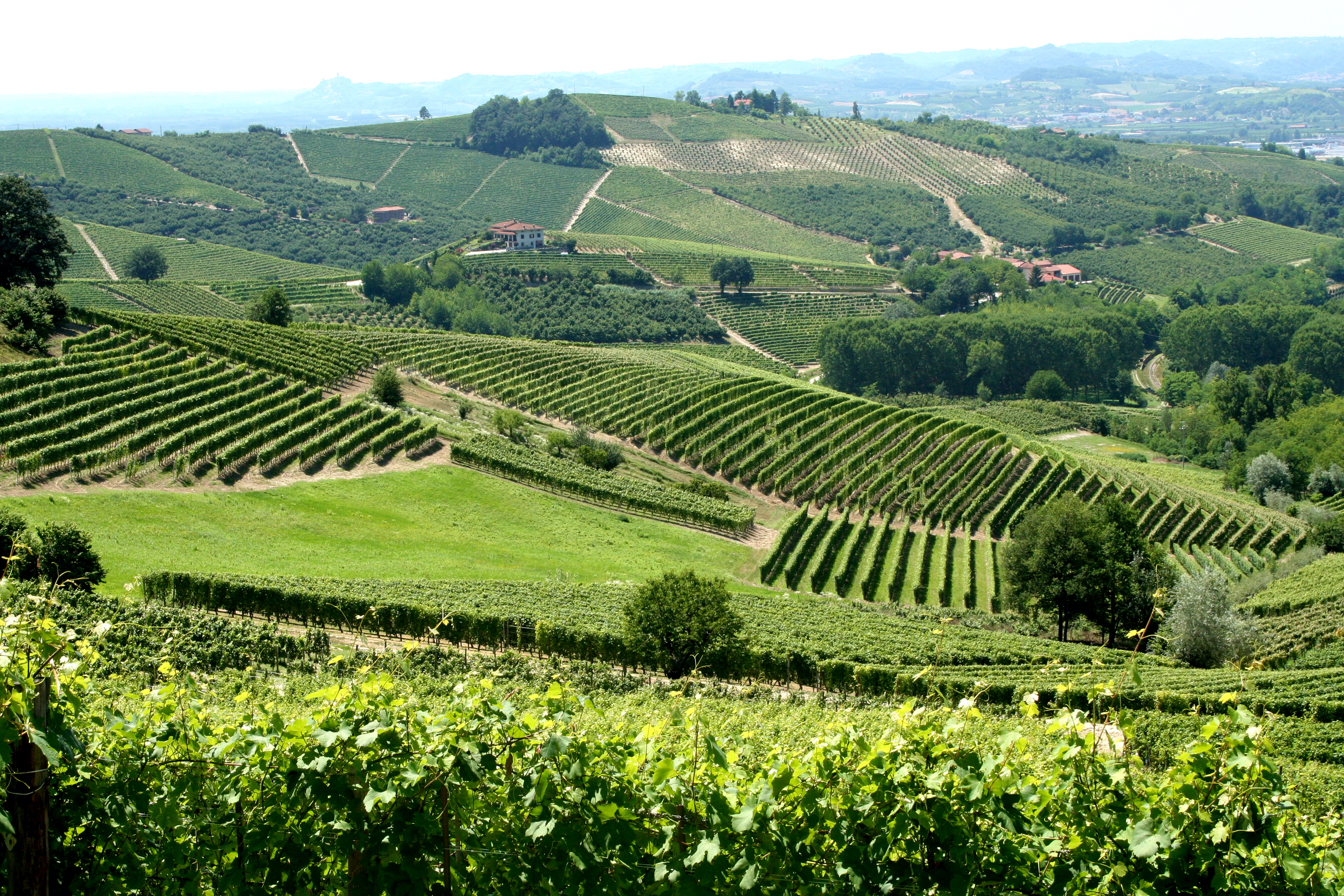
Vineyards in Langhe and Montferrat, Piedmont. Italy is the world's largest wine producer, and has the widest variety of indigenous grapevines.

Many settlements were originally built on hills, either to avoid floods (particularly if they were near a large body of water), for defense (since they offer a good view of the surrounding land and require would-be attackers to fight uphill), or to avoid densely forested areas. For example, Ancient Rome was built on seven hills, helping to protect it from invaders.

Some settlements, particularly in the Middle East, are located on artificial hills consisting of debris (particularly mudbricks) that has accumulated over many generations. Such a location is known as a "tell".

In Northern Europe, many ancient monuments are sited in hills, higher located places. Some of these are defensive structures (such as the hillforts of the Iron Age), but others appear to have hardly any significance. In Britain, many churches at the tops of hills are thought to have been built on the sites of earlier pagan holy places. The Washington National Cathedral in Washington, D.C. has followed this tradition and was built on the highest position in that city.

Some cities' hills are culturally significant in their foundation, defense, and history. In addition to Rome, hills have played a prominent role in the history of San Francisco, with its hills being central to the city's fog and civil engineering projects today famous as tourist attractions such as the cable cars and Lombard Street.

== Military significance ==
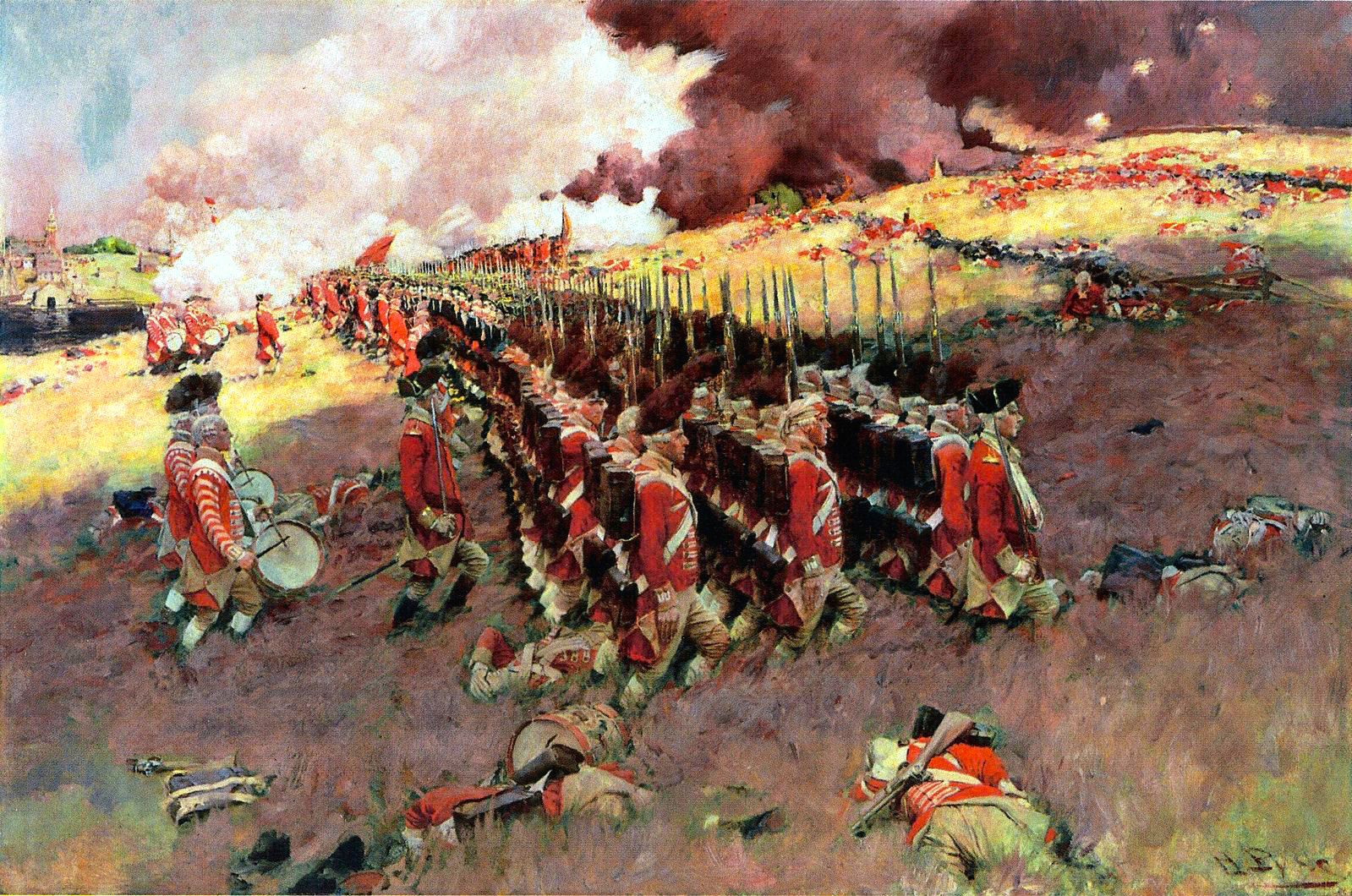
British soldiers advancing uphill in the Battle of Bunker Hill

Hills provide important advantages to an army that controls their heights, giving them an elevated view and firing position and forcing an opposing army to charge uphill to attack a fort or other position. They may also conceal forces behind them, allowing a force to lie in wait on the crest of a hill, using that crest for cover, and firing on unsuspecting attackers as they broach the hilltop. As a result, conventional military strategies often demand possession of high ground.

Because of their tactical value, hills have been the site of many notable battles, such as the Battle of Alesia in 52 BC and the first recorded military conflict in Scotland, the Battle of Mons Graupius in AD 83. Modern era conflicts include the 1775 Battle of Bunker Hill (which was actually fought on Breed's Hill) in the American War of Independence; and Cemetery Hill and Culp's Hill in the 1863 Battle of Gettysburg, the turning point of the American Civil War. The Battle of San Juan Hill in the 1898 Spanish–American War won the Americans control of Santiago de Cuba but only after suffering heavy casualties inflicted by a much smaller force entrenched on the hill top.

Battles for the possession of high ground have often resulted in heavy casualties to both sides, such as the 1969 Battle of Hamburger Hill during the Vietnam War, the Battle of Stalingrad and Battle of Peleliu during World War II, and the 1969 Kargil War between India and Pakistan.

The Great Wall of China is an enduring example of hilltop fortification. It was built on hilltops to help defend against invaders from the north, such as Mongols.

== Sports and games ==
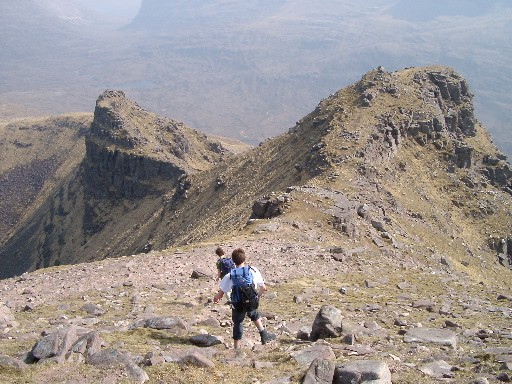
Hillwalkers on Beinn Dearg, Scotland

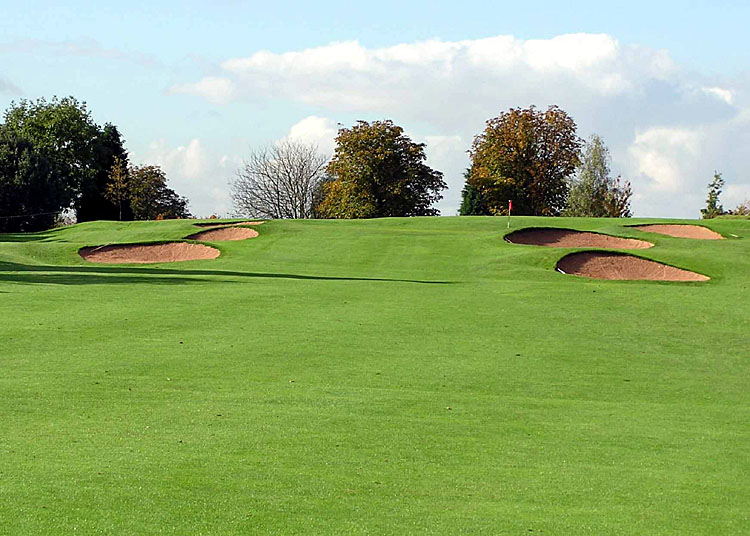
An example of a golf course in England that has hills

Hillwalking is a British English term for a form of hiking which involves the ascent of hills. The activity is usually distinguished from mountaineering as it does not involve ropes or technically difficult rock climbing, although the terms mountain and hill are often used interchangeably in Britain. Hillwalking is popular in hilly areas such as the English Peak District and the Scottish Highlands. Many hills are categorized according to relative height or other criteria and feature on lists named after mountaineers, such as Munros (Scotland) and Wainwrights (England). Specific activities such as "peak bagging" (or "Munro bagging") involve climbing hills on these lists with the aim of eventually climbing every hill on the list.

Cooper's Hill Cheese-Rolling and Wake is an annual event in the West Country of England which involves rolling a wheel of cheese down a hill. Contestants stand at the top and chase the wheel of cheese to the bottom. The winner, the one who catches the cheese, gets a wheel of cheese as a prize.

Cross country running courses may include hills which can add diversity and challenge to those courses.

== Notable artificial hills ==
=== Mound ===
- Sophienhöhe, Germany (200 m (660 ft))
- Monte Kaolino, Germany (120 m (390 ft))
- Kvarntorpshögen, Sweden (100 m (330 ft))
- Malminkartanonhuippu, Finland (91 m (299 ft))
- Mausoleum of the First Qin Emperor, China (76 m (249 ft))
- Five Sisters Bing, Scotland (70 m (230 ft))
- Monte Stella, Italy (45 m (148 ft))
- Blackstrap Ski Hill, Canada (45 m (148 ft))
- Jingshan Hill, China (45 m (148 ft))
- Silbury Hill, England (40 m (130 ft))
- Mount Manisty, England (30 m (100 ft))
- Monks Mound, Illinois (30 m (98 ft))

=== Man-made mountain ===
- Shanghai Expo Park Mountains (40 m (130 ft))

== Gallery ==
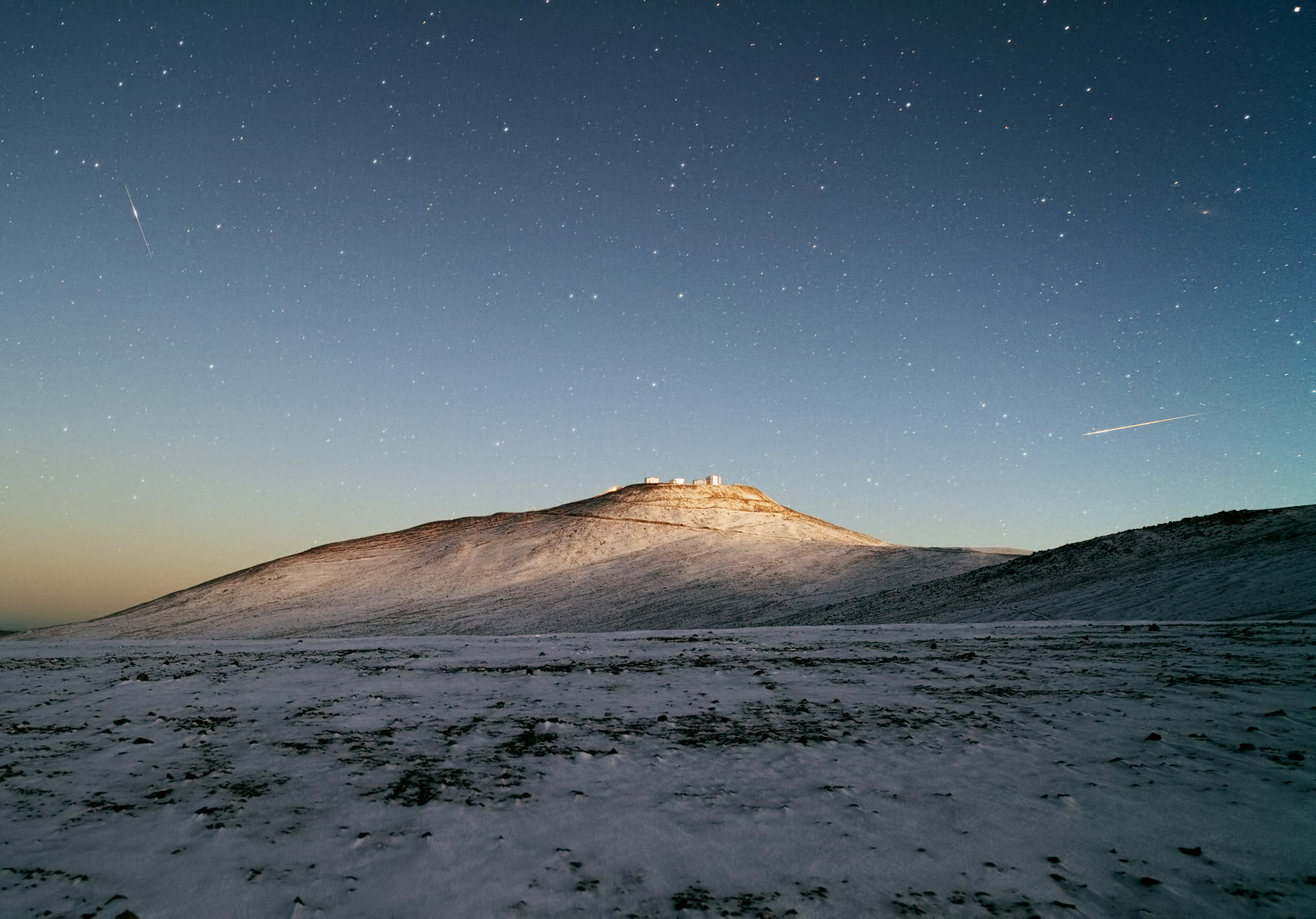
Cerro Paranal in Chile is a privileged place for astronomical observation, and home of ESO's telescopes.

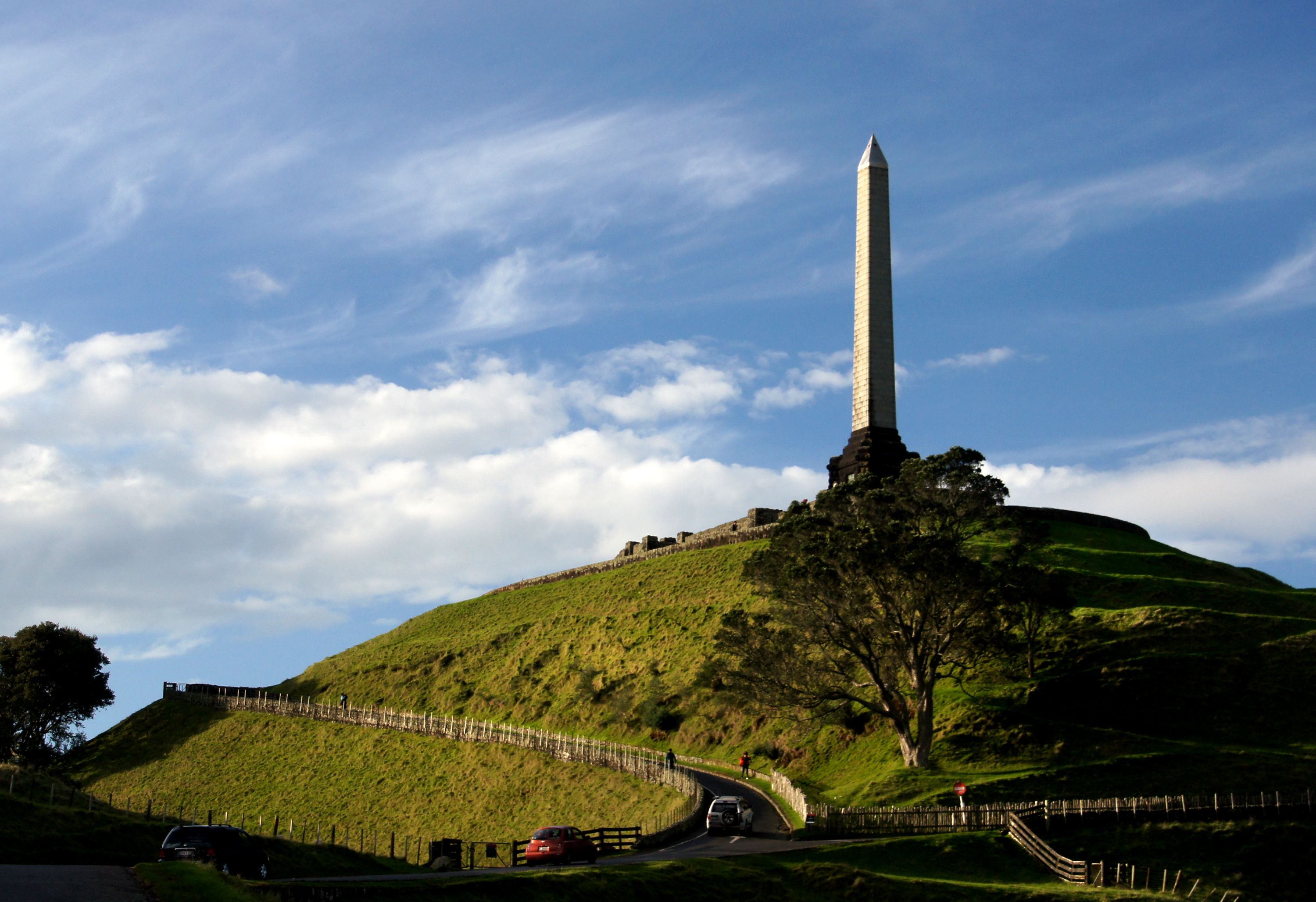
Maungakiekie / One Tree Hill is a prominent feature of the skyline of Auckland, New Zealand.

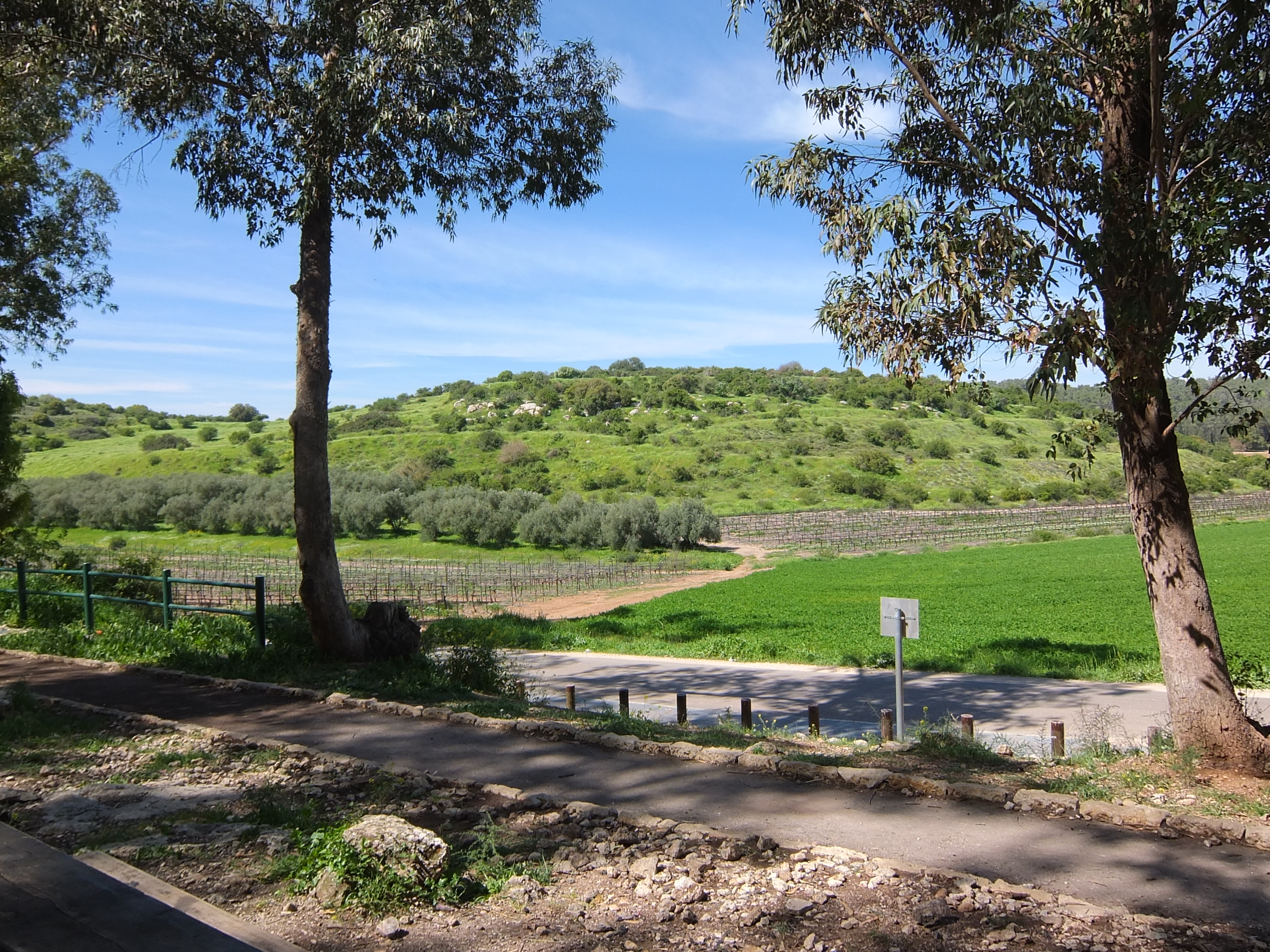
Hill in Israel

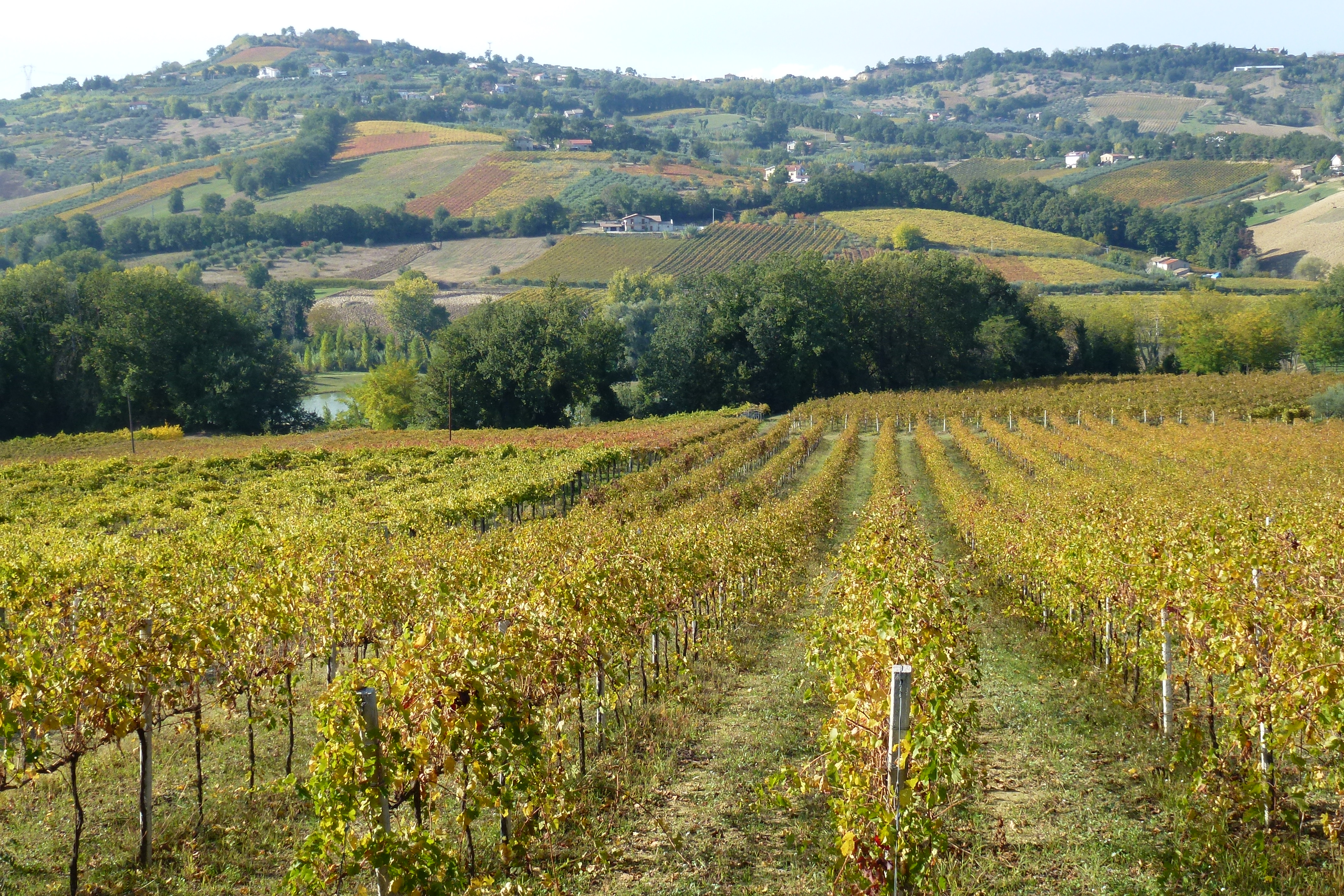
Hill in Abruzzo, Italy

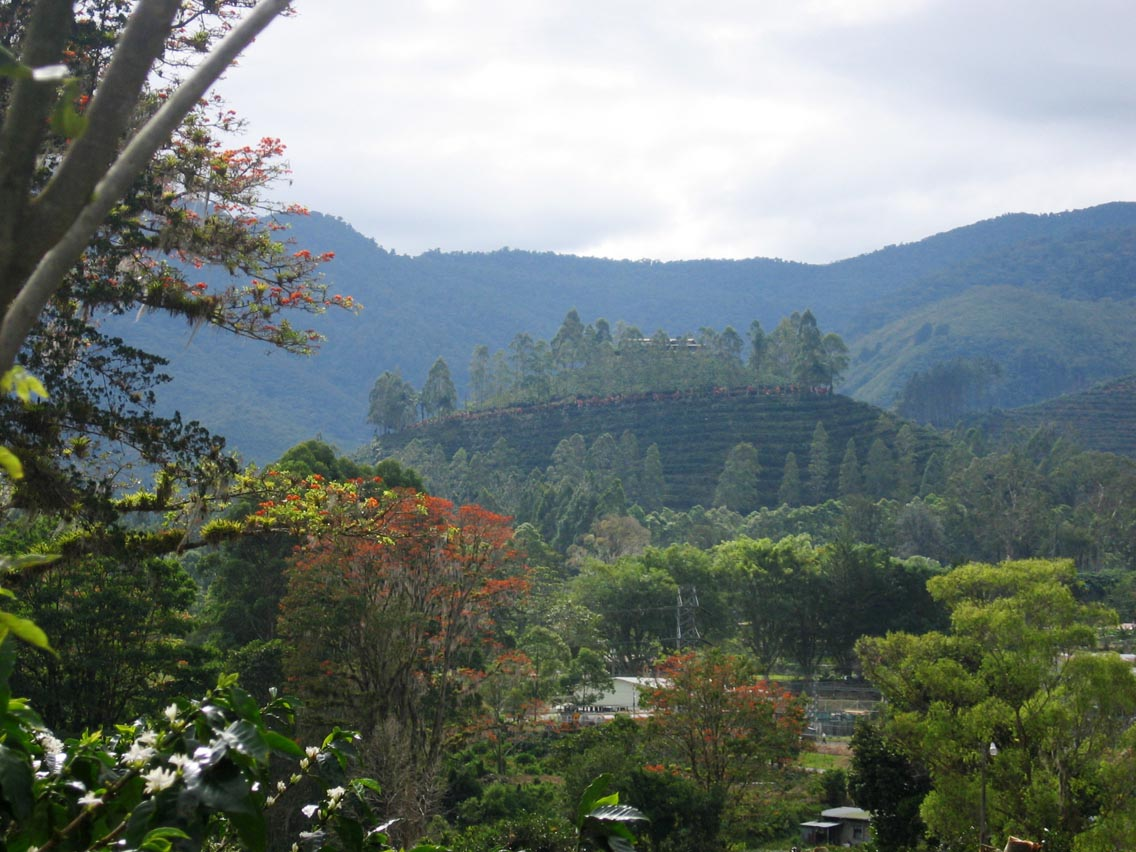
A coffee plantation on a conical hill near Orosí, Costa Rica.

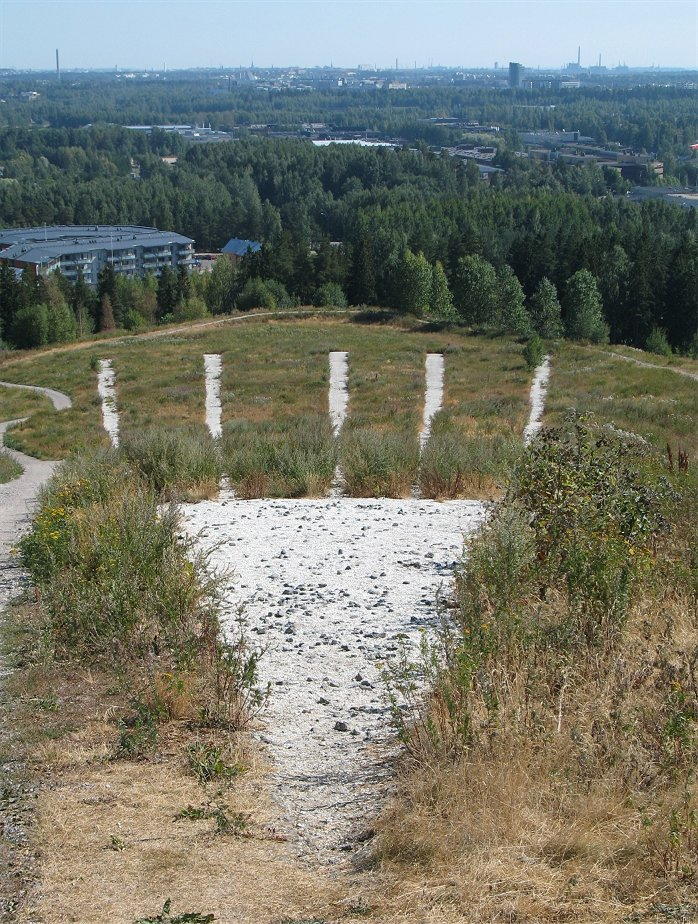
An arrow pointing towards the top of the Malminkartanonhuippu hill in Helsinki, Finland.

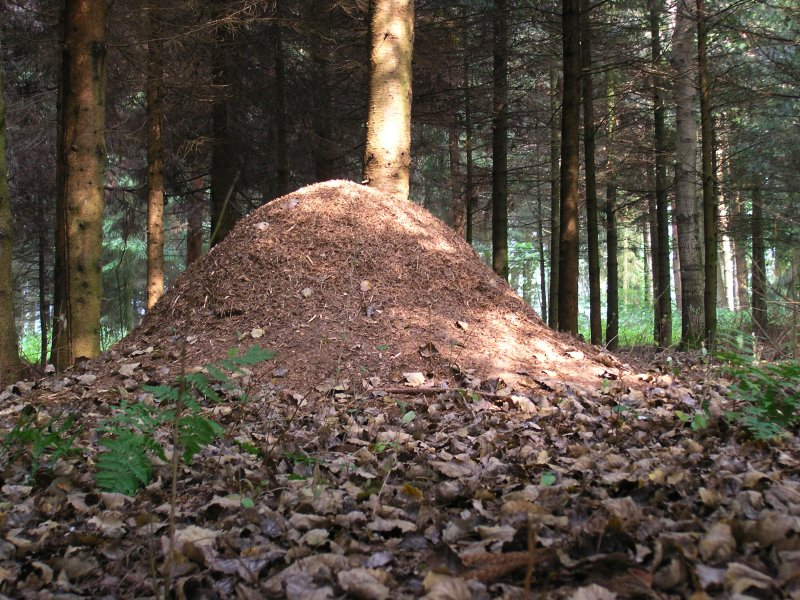
An ant mound, or ant-hill, a mound sometimes casually referred to as a hill

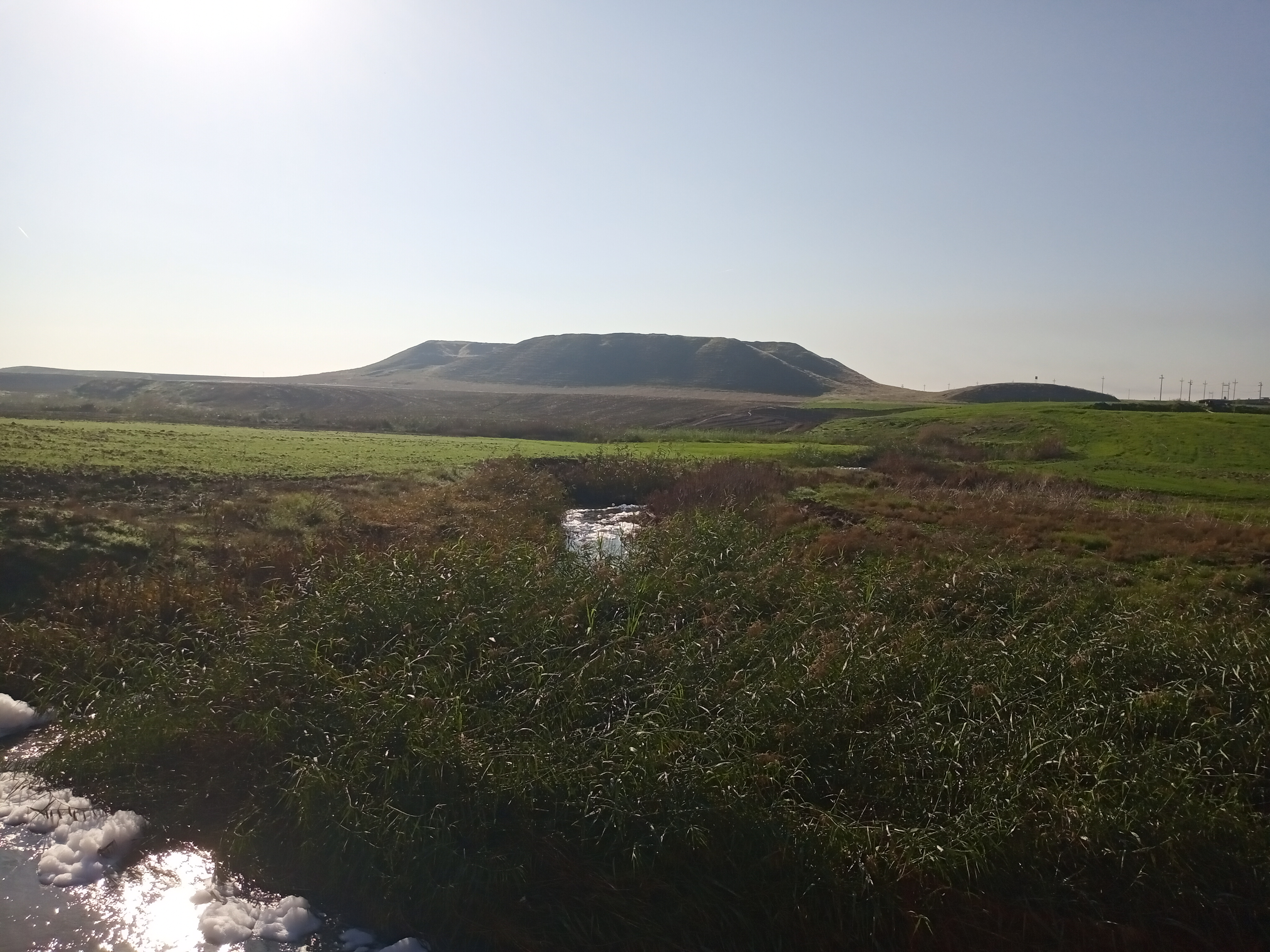
The archaeological hill of Qasr shamamk in Erbil

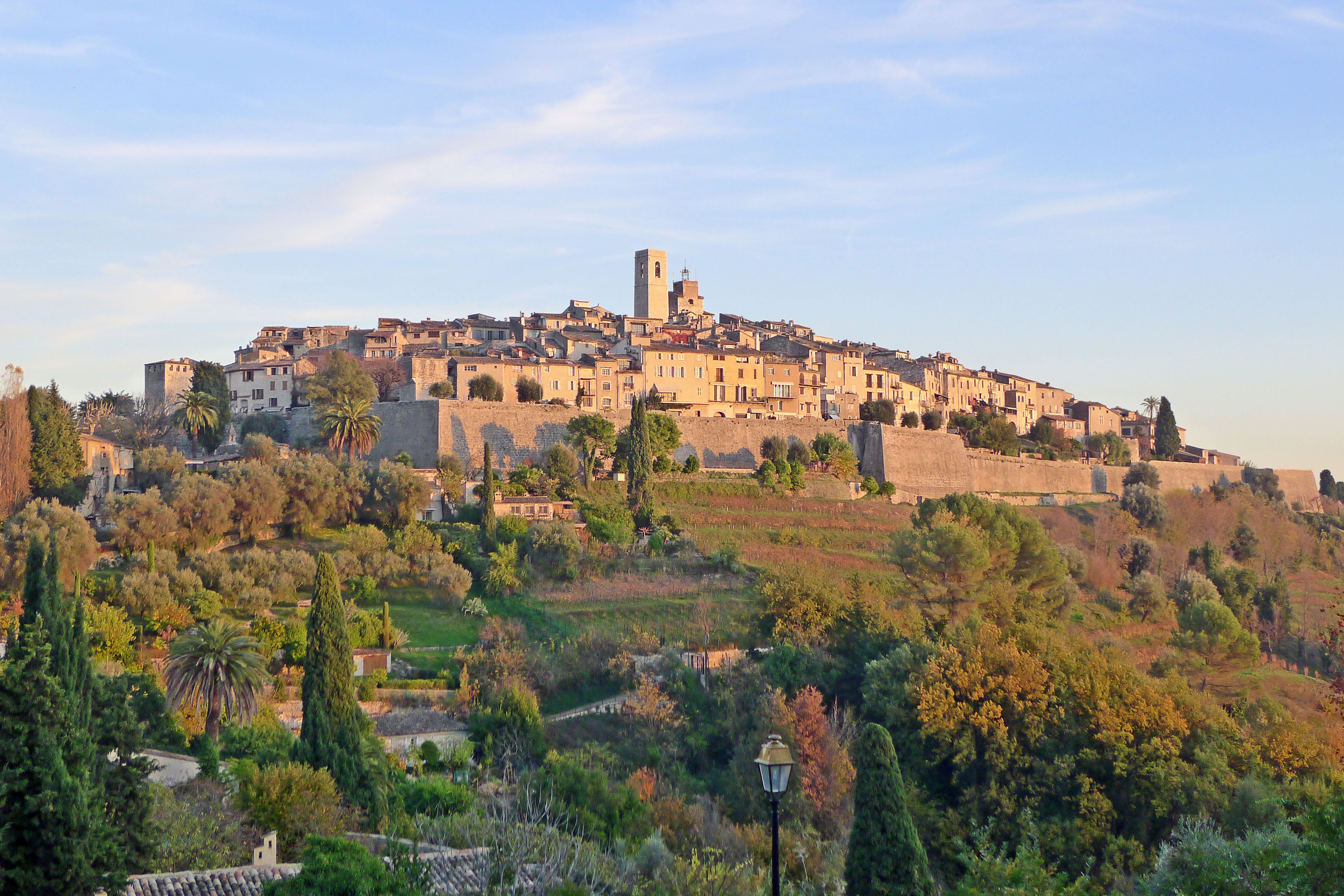
Hill upon which the village of Saint-Paul-de-Vence is built, in Southern France

== See also ==
- Abyssal hill – Small hill that rises from the floor of an abyssal plain
- Breast-shaped hill – Hills shaped like a human breast
- Colluvium – Loose, unconsolidated sediments deposited at the base of a hillslope
- Crag and tail – Geographic feature created by glaciation
- Dune – Hill of loose sand built by aeolian processes or the flow of water
- Hill Country – Region of Texas, United States
- Hillock – Small hill
- Hill station – Mountain resort in European colonies
- Kame – Mound formed on a retreating glacier and deposited on land
- Mesa – Elevated area of land with a flat top and sides, usually much wider than buttes
- Monolith – Stone block made of one single piece; object made of one single rock piece
- Moor – Type of habitat
- Motte – Medieval fortification
- Mound – Heaped pile of earth, gravel, sand, rocks, or debris
- Tell – Ancient settlement mound
- Witch of Agnesi – Cubic plane curve
