= Maununneva =

Coordinates: 60°15′N 24°54′E

Maununneva Magnuskärr
- Helsinki Subdivision
- Interactive map of Maununneva
- Country: Finland
- Region: Uusimaa
- Sub-region: Greater Helsinki
- Municipality: Helsinki
- District: Western
- Area: 1.89 km^{2} (0.73 sq mi)
- Population: 2,448
  - Density: 1,395/km^{2} (3,610/sq mi)
- Postal codes: 00430, 00431
- Subdivision number: 293
- Neighbouring subdivisions: Hakuninmaa, Haltiala, Paloheinä, Länsi-Pakila, Pirkkola, Lassila, Kannelmäki

Maununneva (Finnish), Magnuskärr (Swedish) is a neighborhood of Helsinki, Finland. It is a subdivision of the Kaarela district in Helsinki.
