= Konala =

Coordinates: 60°14′N 24°51′E

Konala Kånala
- Helsinki Subdivision
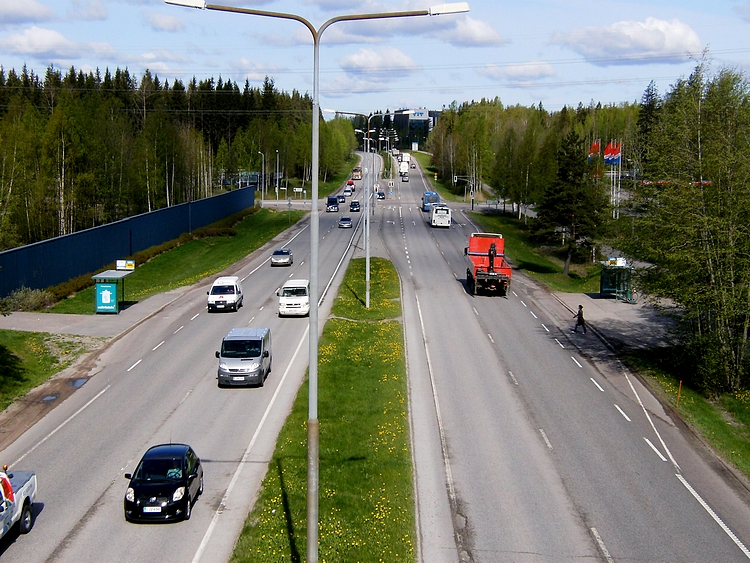
- The regional road 120 (Vihdintie) in Konala

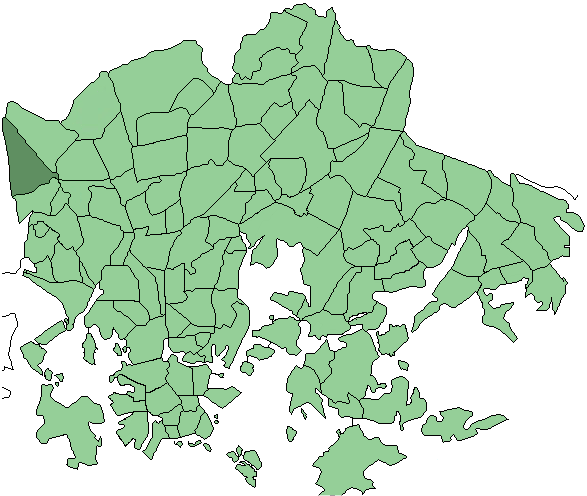
- Position of Konala within Helsinki
- Country: Finland
- Region: Uusimaa
- Sub-region: Greater Helsinki
- Municipality: Helsinki
- District: Western
- Area: 2.32 km^{2} (0.90 sq mi)
- Population: 4,450
  - Density: 1,918/km^{2} (4,970/sq mi)
- Postal codes: 00390
- Subdivision number: 32
- Neighbouring subdivisions: Pitäjänmäki; Malminkartano; Kannelmäki

Konala (Finnish), Kånala (Swedish) is a subdistrict of Helsinki, Finland. Konala is situated in north-western Helsinki, north of the road Ring I and Pitäjänmäki, west of Malminkartano and Kannelmäki. Its southern boundary is the Ring I, while the eastern boundary is a green belt which separates the industrial area along the road Vihdintie from Malminkartano. In the west, Konala borders Espoo.

The houses are mainly small apartment houses and townhouses. The area also contains industrial and commercial enterprises. Vihdintie has several automotive companies. The Ristikko Shopping Centre, which opened in 2015, is also located in Konala.

The road Konalantie splits Konala into two different parts. On the eastern side of the Konalantie, there are regional blocks of industry, business and apartment blocks. On the western side of the road, there are terraced houses, such as the houses by the road Äestäjäntie. The newer Lehtovuori suburb, between the road Vihdintie and the Uusmäki suburb in Espoo, is mainly composed of wooden houses.

Konalan ala-aste, a primary school, operates at two separate locations. The so-called "big school" is located by the Riihipellonkuja and was founded in 1981. The schoolhouse is a low white building, and it provides education for grades 1-6 as well as special education. Near the border with Espoo, there is the Hilatien Koulu, which was founded in 1990 and provided education for the grades 1–2. The "little school" was closed in 2011 - 2012 due to poor indoor air quality.

== History ==
The original inhabitants of Konala were Tavastians. The name Konala is derived from an older Tavastian village name Konhola, which is situated in the modern municipality of Akaa.

Konala, under Pitäjänmäki, became a part of Helsinki in the great areal transfer of 1946. Before that, it belonged to Helsingin maalaiskunta (modern Vantaa). Konala became a separate district in 1959.

== Politics ==
Results of the 2011 Finnish parliamentary election in Konala:

- National Coalition Party 27.4%
- Social Democratic Party of Finland 19.1%
- True Finns 18.1%
- Green League 12.6%
- Left Alliance 7.5%
- Centre Party 5.9%
- Swedish People's Party 3.8%
- Christian Democrats 2.5%

== Other ==
- Rap-band Konala Cartelli was founded in Konala.
- TV shows, such as MTV3's popular Salatut elämät ("Secret Lives"), are filmed at a studio in Konala.
- A board-game by Konalan ala-aste parents-association called Konala-peli (Konala-game) was published in 1995.
- Scandinavia's largest rehearsal complex, Indie Center, which rents its rehearsal areas for bands.
- Malminkartanonhuippu, approximately 90-meters high artificial hill, is located near the borders of Konala and Malminkartano.
