= Haaga Rhododendron Park =

Public park in Helsinki, Finland

- Haagan Alppiruusupuisto
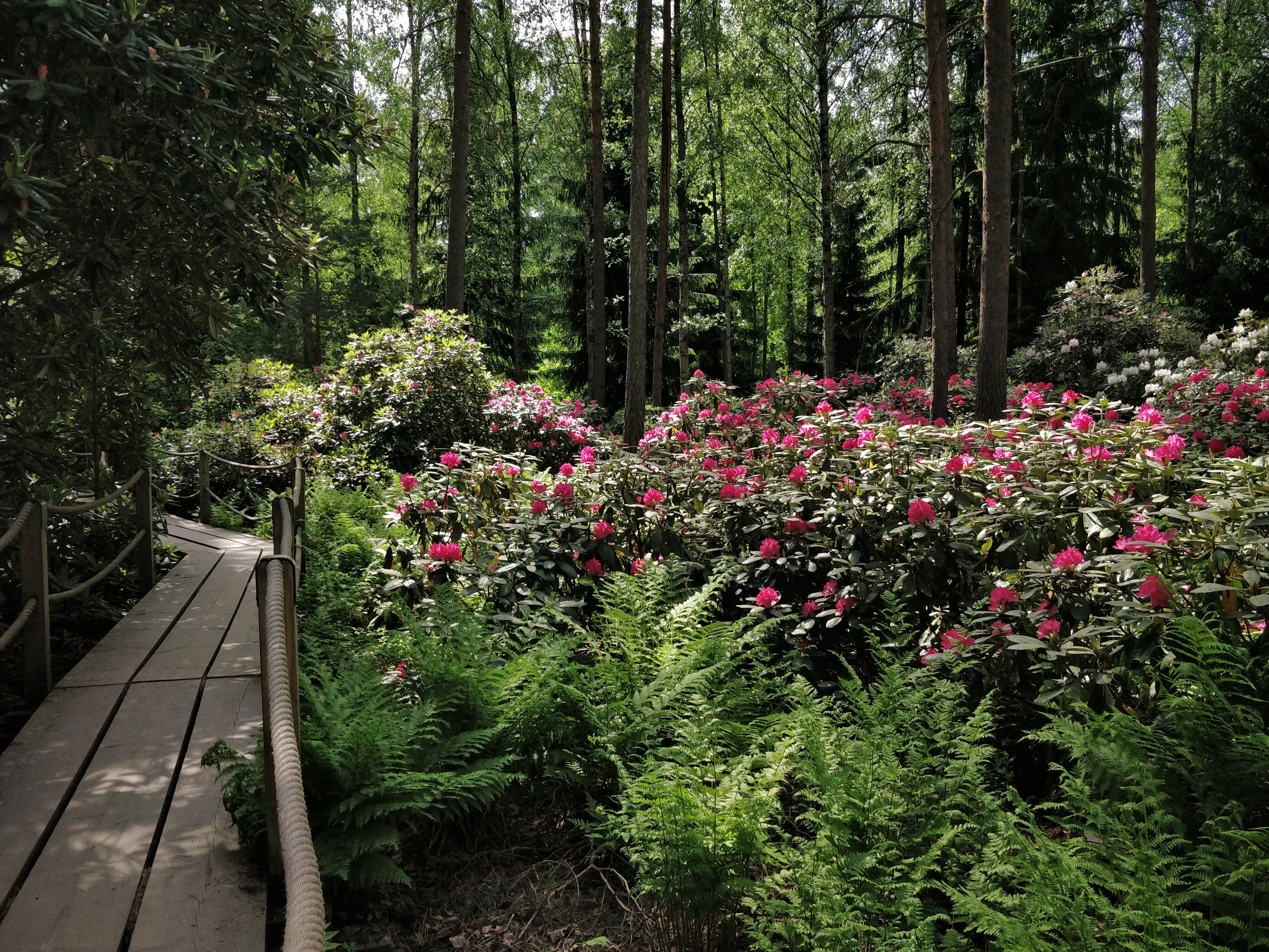
- Flowering rhododendrons in May 2018
- Interactive map of Haaga Rhododendron Park
- Location: Haaga, Helsinki, Finland
- Coordinates: 60.2219°N 24.8932°E
- Area: 8.22 hectares (20.31 acres)
- Established: 1975
- Plants: Rhododendron, azalea
- Public transit: Huopalahti railway station

The Haaga Rhododendron Park (Finnish: Haagan Alppiruusupuisto; Swedish: Alprosparken i Haga) is a public park containing various varieties of rhododendron, located in the district of Haaga in Helsinki, Finland. Although originally used for breeding and research purposes, the park is now a popular attraction among locals.

The first rhododendrons were planted in 1975 by the University of Helsinki's selective breeding program; this included the construction of a series of wooden walkways, allowing travel by visitors without disturbing the plants. Originally 3000 individual specimens were planted, with the goal of breeding species to adapt to the Finnish climate. The 3000 original specimens had been selectively bred from the Japanese Rhododendron brachycarpum D.Don ex G.Don. Sometimes this taxon is named R. fauriei, but that name was described by Franch. in 1886, while R. brachycarpum dates from 1843. In 1996, the park was expanded to the north with an additional 1500 azalea specimens, also originating from Japan.

Through its existence, the park has produced eight unique cultivars for commercial purposes; they're named after the park, the university, and various individuals involved with the project.

The park is a popular local attraction, particularly in the early summer, when rhododendrons flower.

== See also ==
- Azalea and Rhododendron Park Kromlau
- Rhododendron-Park Bremen
