= Reijola =

Reijola (in Finnish) Grejus (in Swedish)
- District of Helsinki
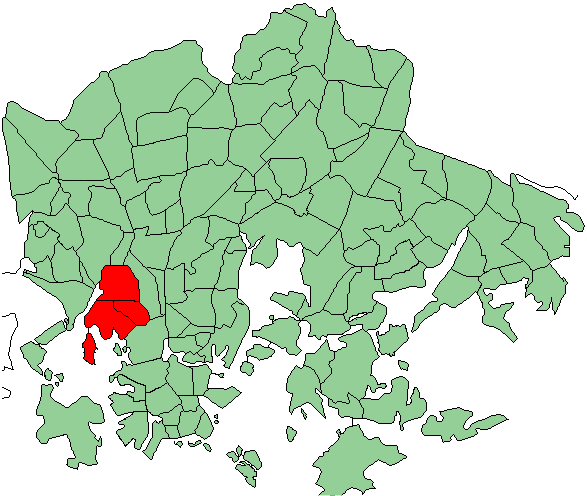
- Location in Helsinki
- Country: Finland
- Province: Southern Finland
- Region: Uusimaa
- Sub-region: Helsinki

Area
  - Total: 1.68 sq mi (4.34 km^{2})

Population
  - Total: 15,090
  - Density: 9,010/sq mi (3,477/km^{2})
- Time zone: UTC+2 (EET)
  - Summer (DST): UTC+3 (EEST)

Reijola (Swedish: Grejus) is a district located on Western major district of Helsinki, Finland. It consists of three subareas: Laakso, Ruskeasuo and Meilahti.

As of 2005, Reijola has 15,090 inhabitants living in an area of 4.34 km^{2}.
