= Ristikko =

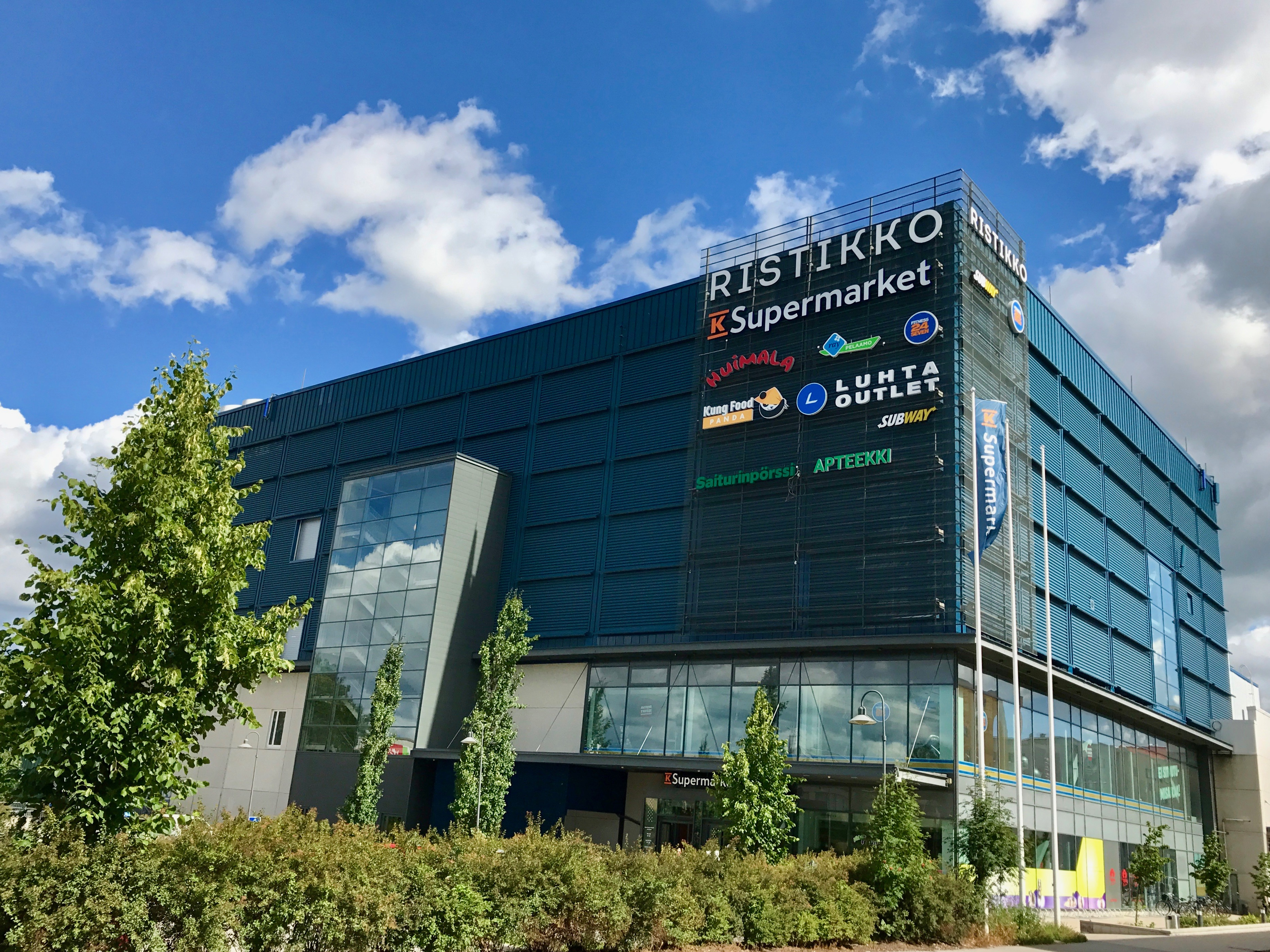
- Shopping center Ristikko
- Location: Konala, Helsinki, Finland
- Coordinates: 60°14′21.1″N 24°50′58.5″E
- Address: Ajomiehentie 1
- Opened: 2015
- Owner: Hartela (50%); Ilmarinen (50%)
- Num. of stores: over 25
- Num. of anchor tenants: 5
- Floor area: 11,332 square metres
- Parking: 340
- Website: kauppakeskusristikko.fi/english/

Ristikko (Finnish pronunciation: [ˈristikːo], literally meaning "lattice") is a shopping center in Helsinki, Finland, built on the premises of Hartwall's former bottle warehouse in the Konala district. It is located near the intersection of busy road connections, Vihdintie (Route 120) and Ring I (Route 101), and buses run to the center of Helsinki, Hakaniemi, Western Vantaa and Northern Espoo, among other places. The name ristikko is rooted in a combination of the building's load-bearing, old and new lattice structures.

The first phases of the shopping center opened in 2008–2009, and it was completed in its entirety in 2015. The shopping center is half owned by Hartela Etelä-Suomi Oy and Ilmarinen, a pension insurance company. The Gross leasable area (GLA) is 13,787 square meters and the net leasable area (NLA) is 11,332 square meters. The shopping center includes K-Supermarket, Saiturinpörssi, Posti, Konalan asukastila, KiipeilyAreena Ristikko, Fitness24Seven, Luhta Outlet, a pharmacy, a few hairdressers and restaurants. There are 340 parking spaces in connection with the shopping center.

In 2020, the shopping center was visited by 1.5 million people and annual sales were EUR 28.5 million.
