= Marttila, Helsinki =

Coordinates: 60.228°N 24.868°E

Marttila Martas
- Helsinki Subdivision
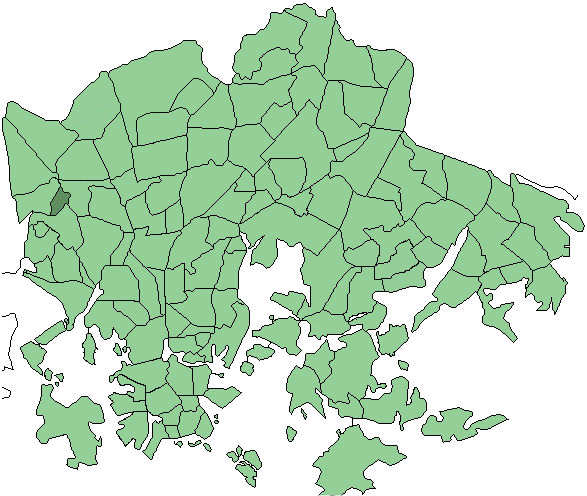
- Position of Marttila within Helsinki
- Country: Finland
- Region: Uusimaa
- Sub-region: Greater Helsinki
- Municipality: Helsinki
- District: Western
- Area: 0.38 km^{2} (0.15 sq mi)
- Population: 357
  - Density: 997/km^{2} (2,580/sq mi)
- Postal codes: 00370
- Subdivision number: 464
- Neighbouring subdivisions: Pitäjänmäen teollisuusalue, Reimarla, Lassila

Marttila (Swedish: Martas) is a neighbourhood located in Pitäjänmäki, Western Helsinki, Finland.

As of 2008, Marttila has 357 inhabitants living in a 0.38 km^{2} area. It is neighboured by Pitäjänmäen teollisuusalue, Reimarla and Lassila
