= Reimarla =

Reimarla Reimars
- Helsinki Subdivision
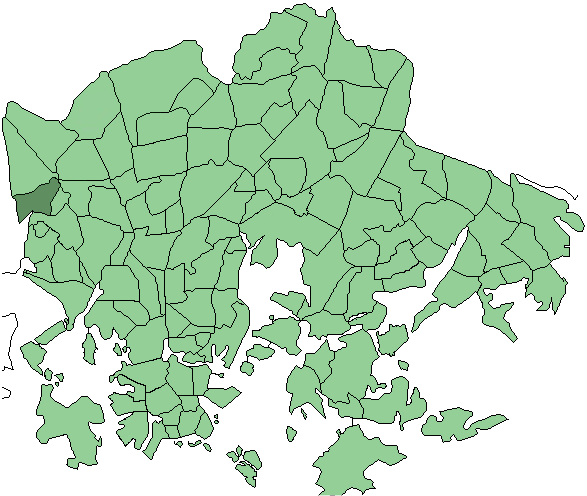
- Position of Reimarla within Helsinki
- Coordinates: 60.22981°N 24.85165°E
- Country: Finland
- Region: Uusimaa
- Sub-region: Greater Helsinki
- Municipality: Helsinki
- District: Western
- Area: 1.22 km^{2} (0.47 sq mi)
- Population: 4,698
  - Density: 3,698/km^{2} (9,580/sq mi)
- Postal codes: 00370
- Subdivision number: 463
- Neighbouring subdivisions: Pitäjänmäen teollisuusalue, Espoo, Konala, Lassila, Marttila

Reimarla (Finnish), Reimars (Swedish) is a western neighborhood of Helsinki, Finland.
