= Pajamäki =

Coordinates: 60°13′10″N 24°51′20″E

Pajamäki Smedjebacka
- Helsinki Subdivision
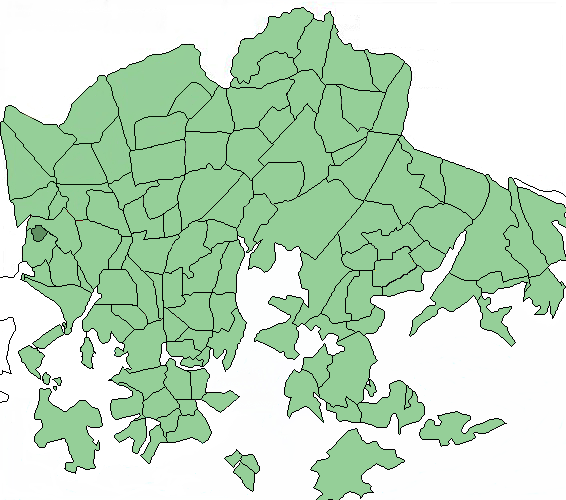
- Position of Pajamäki within Helsinki
- Country: Finland
- Region: Uusimaa
- Sub-region: Greater Helsinki
- Municipality: Helsinki
- District: Western
- Area: 0.27 km^{2} (0.10 sq mi)
- Population: 1,802
  - Density: 6,750/km^{2} (17,500/sq mi)
- Postal codes: 00360
- Subdivision number: 462
- Neighbouring subdivisions: Pitäjänmäen teollisuusalue, Tali, Espoo

Pajamäki (Swedish: Smedjebacka) is a neighborhood of Helsinki, Finland. It is located in Pitäjänmäki district.

As of 2008, Pajamäki has 1,802 inhabitants living in an area of 0.27 km^{2}.
