= Pitäjänmäki industrial area =

Coordinates: 60.222°N 24.874°E

Pitäjänmäen yritysalue Sockenbacka företagsområde
- Helsinki Subdivision
- Position of Pitäjänmäen yritysalue within Helsinki
- Country: Finland
- Region: Uusimaa
- Sub-region: Greater Helsinki
- Municipality: Helsinki
- District: Western
- Area: 1.38 km^{2} (0.53 sq mi)
- Population: 2,415
  - Density: 1,700/km^{2} (4,400/sq mi)
- Postal codes: 00380, 00381
- Subdivision number: 465
- Neighbouring subdivisions: Reimarla, Marttila, Lassila, Etelä-Haaga, Munkkivuori, Tali, Pajamäki, Espoo

The Pitäjänmäki industrial area (Finnish: Pitäjänmäen yritysalue, Swedish: Sockenbacka företagsområde) is a western neighborhood of Helsinki, Finland. It is located in Pitäjänmäki district.

As of 2008, the Pitäjänmäki industrial area, has 2,415 inhabitants living in an area of 1.38 km^{2}.
