= Pitäjänmäki =

District of Helsinki, Finland

Coordinates: 60°13′15″N 24°51′45″E

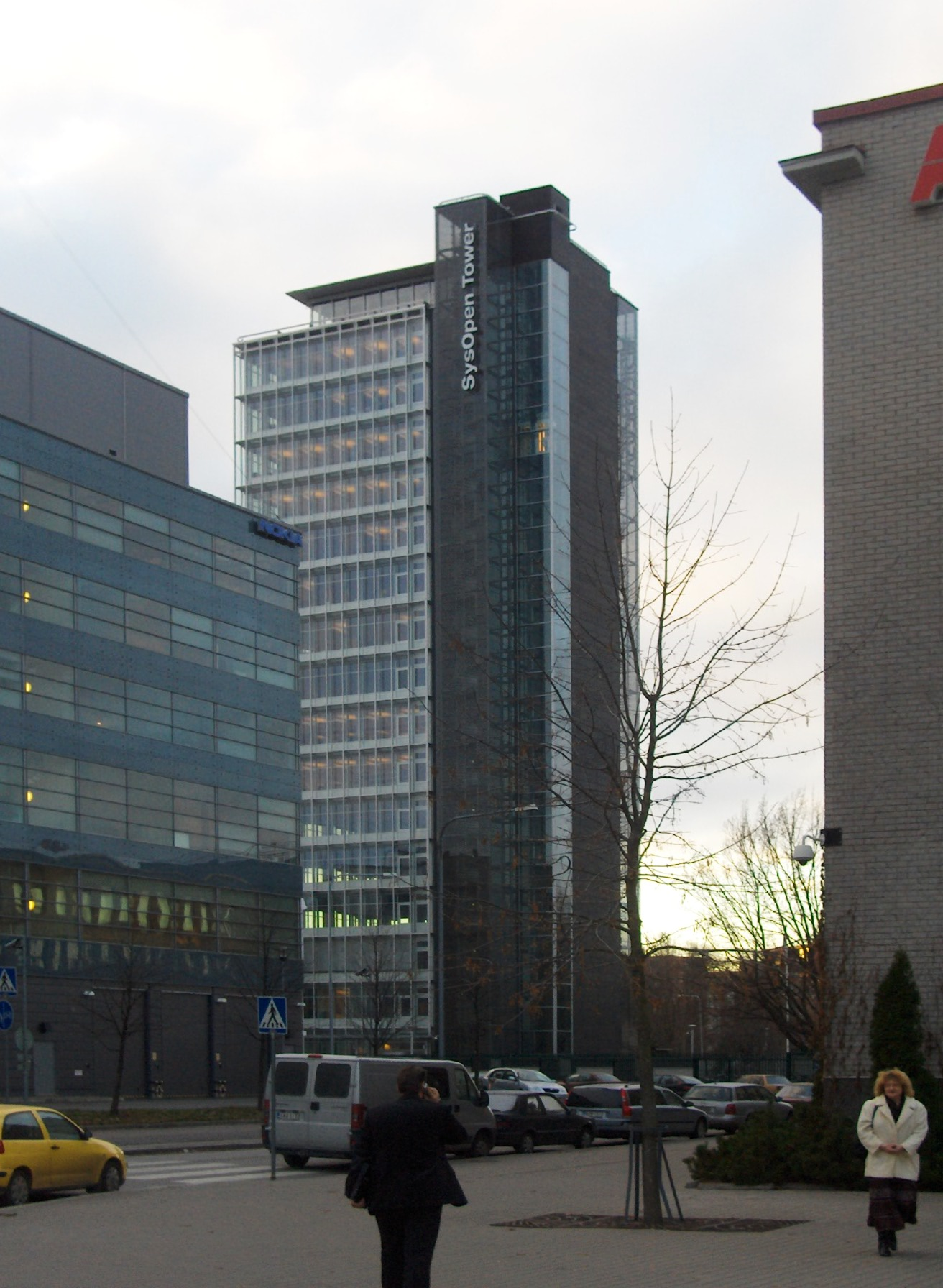
The Digia tower in Pitäjänmäki

Pitäjänmäki (Finnish pronunciation: [ˈpitæjæmˌmæki], Swedish: Sockenbacka) is a district located on the westernmost district of Helsinki, Finland, near the border with Espoo. There are many IT and machine manufacturing companies in the area, especially around the Valimo railway station. Such companies include Nokia, Nokia Siemens Networks, ABB, Fujitsu Siemens, Digia, Martela as well as Nordea Bank, Stockmann Auto Oy and Sweco Industry Oy. Besides, the suburb also contains many residential apartment buildings. The nearest shopping mall is Sello in Leppävaara, Espoo.

Pitäjänmäki hosts a famous designer jewellery manufacturing company called Kalevala Koru.

== See also ==
- Pajamäki (Smedjebacka)
- Tali
- Reimarla (Reimars)
- Marttila (Martas)
- Pitäjänmäki railway station
- Pitäjänmäki industrial area
