= Haltiala =

Coordinates: 60°16′N 24°57′E

Haltiala (in Finnish) Tomtbacka (in Swedish)
- Neighborhood of Helsinki
- Interactive map of Haltiala (in Finnish); Tomtbacka (in Swedish)
- Country: Finland
- Province: Southern Finland
- Region: Uusimaa
- Sub-region: Helsinki
- Time zone: UTC+2 (EET)
  - Summer (DST): UTC+3 (EEST)

Haltiala (Finnish), Tomtbacka (Swedish) is a northwestern neighborhood of Helsinki, Finland.
