= Malminkartanonhuippu =

Coordinates: 60°15′4″N 24°50′39″E

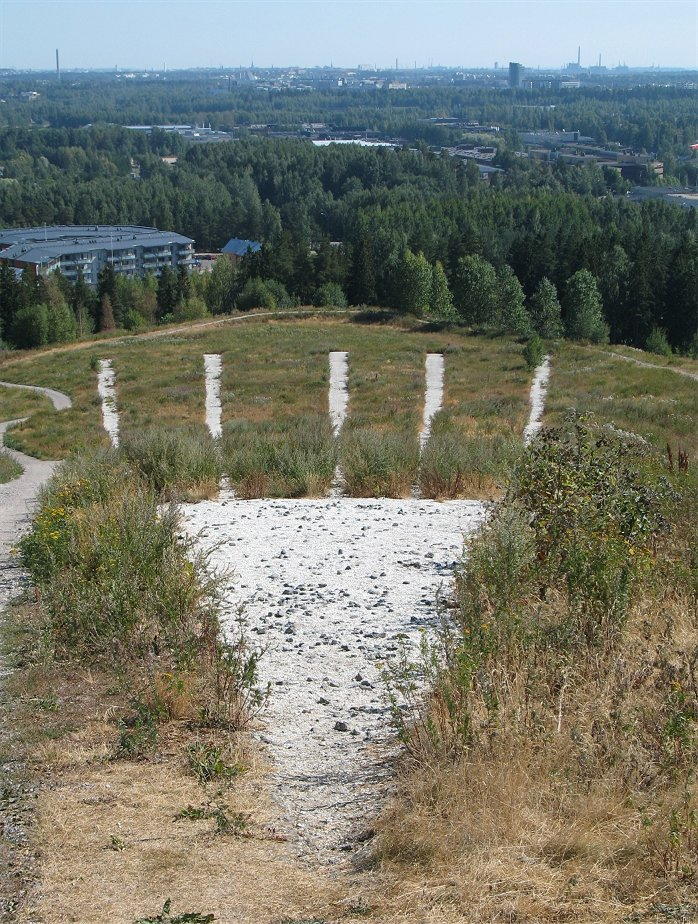
An arrow pointing towards the top of the hill.

Malminkartanonhuippu (English: Malminkartano Hill, Swedish: Malmgårdstoppen) is an artificial hill in the district of Malminkartano in Helsinki, Finland. It is located near to the Vihti Road and the Myyrmäki district of Vantaa. With a height of approximately 90 meters above sea level, it is the highest point in the city of Helsinki. The view from the top gives an uninterrupted 360° panorama in all directions, for those who have climbed the 347 steps.

One face of the hill includes a giant arrow-shaped artwork pointing upwards and several hundred metres in length.

Nicknames include "Täyttömäki" (filling hill) Jätemäki ("dump hill") and Jättäri ("leftovers"). All of these slang terms derive from the site's past use as a municipal landfill site, between the years of 1976–1996. It contains mostly construction waste such as sand, bricks, stones, concrete etc.

The hill is commonly used, during the summer months, as a mini downhill mountain bike track, and has a reasonably aggressive set of turns and jumps for those prepared to climb the hill. It's also a fairly well used exercise area for joggers, and an excellent slope for sledding in the winter.

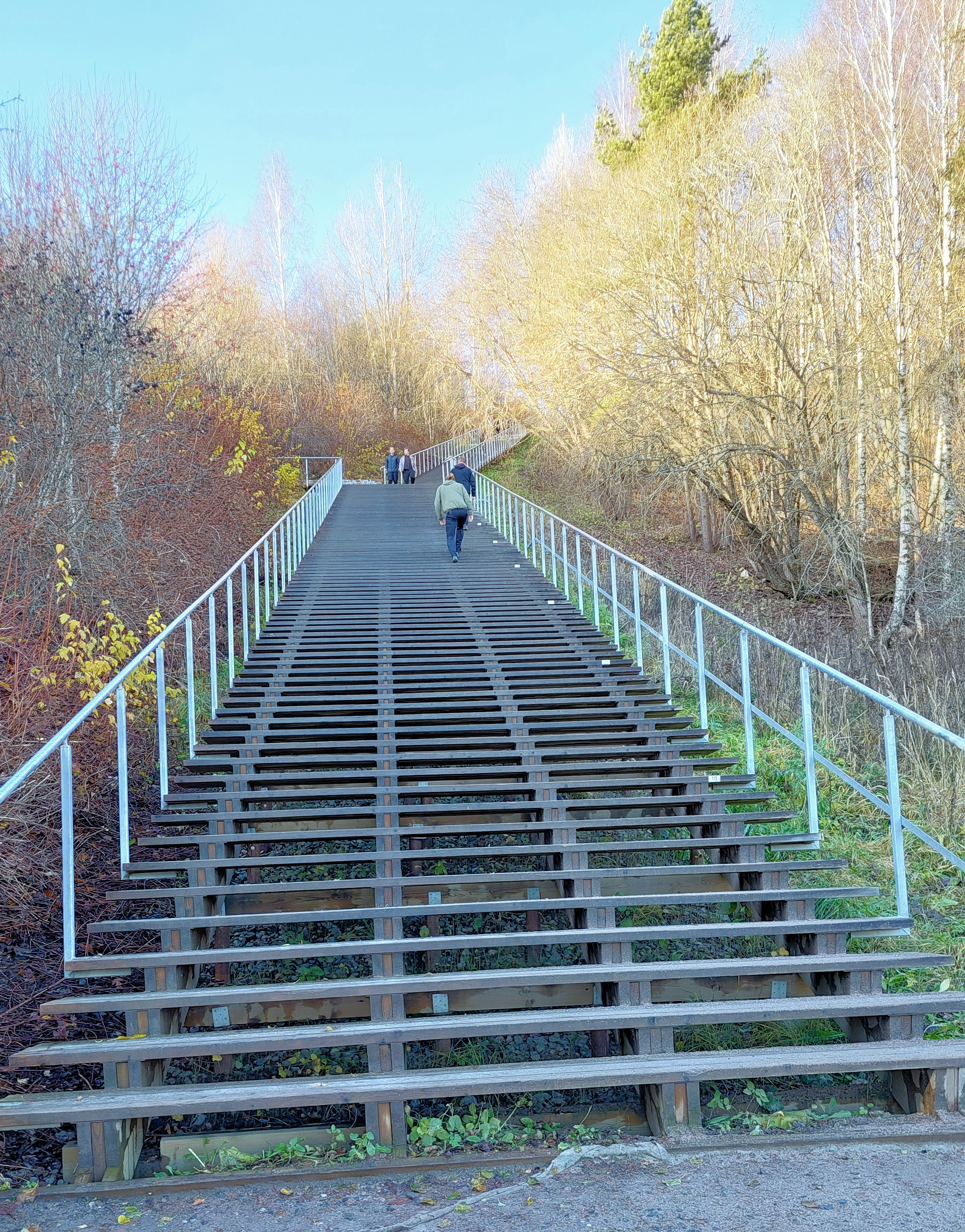
Stairs at Malminkartano hill

In 2017, and again in 2021 a professional piano moving company carried a 200-kilogram (440 lb) instrument up the steps to the top of the hill. In between the two attempts the wooden steps had been renewed.
