= Lassila =

Lassila Lassas
- Helsinki Subdivision
- Position of Lassila within Helsinki
- Country: Finland
- Region: Uusimaa
- Sub-region: Greater Helsinki
- Municipality: Helsinki
- District: Western
- Area: 1.29 km^{2} (0.50 sq mi)
- Population: 4,089
  - Density: 3,170/km^{2} (8,200/sq mi)
- Postal codes: 00440, 00441
- Subdivision number: 294
- Neighbouring subdivisions: Kannelmäki, Pirkkola, Pohjois-Haaga, Etelä-Haaga, Pitäjänmäen teollisuusalue, Marttila, Reimarla

Lassila (Finnish), Lassas (Swedish) is a neighborhood in western Helsinki, Finland. It was mostly developed in the 1980s and 1990s.
