= Malminkartano =

Coordinates: 60°14′49″N 24°51′43″E

Malminkartano Malmgård
- Helsinki Subdivision
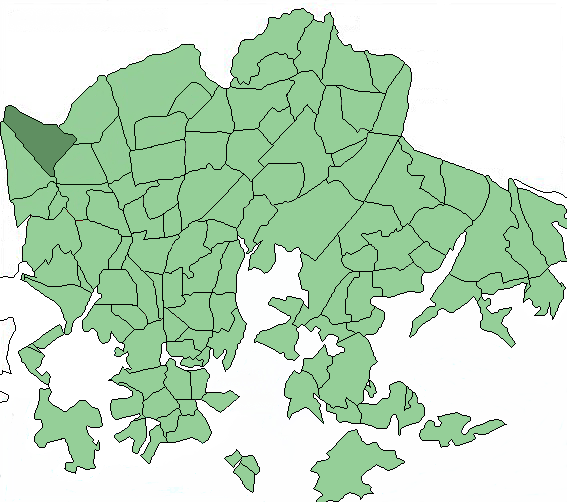
- Position of Malminkartano within Helsinki
- Region: Uusimaa
- Municipality: Helsinki
- District: Western
- Boroughs: List: is a quarter of the Kaarela neighbourhood
- Area: 2.26 km^{2} (0.87 sq mi)
- Postal codes: 00410

Malminkartano (Malmgård in Swedish) is a suburb and a quarter in the western part of Helsinki city, part of the Kaarela neighbourhood. Kehärata, the railway that goes through the airport back to Helsinki, has a station in Malminkartano. The suburb's artificial hill, Malminkartanonhuippu or Malminkartanon täyttömäki is the highest point of Helsinki. Malminkartano is often called Maltsu by young people.

== Gallery ==
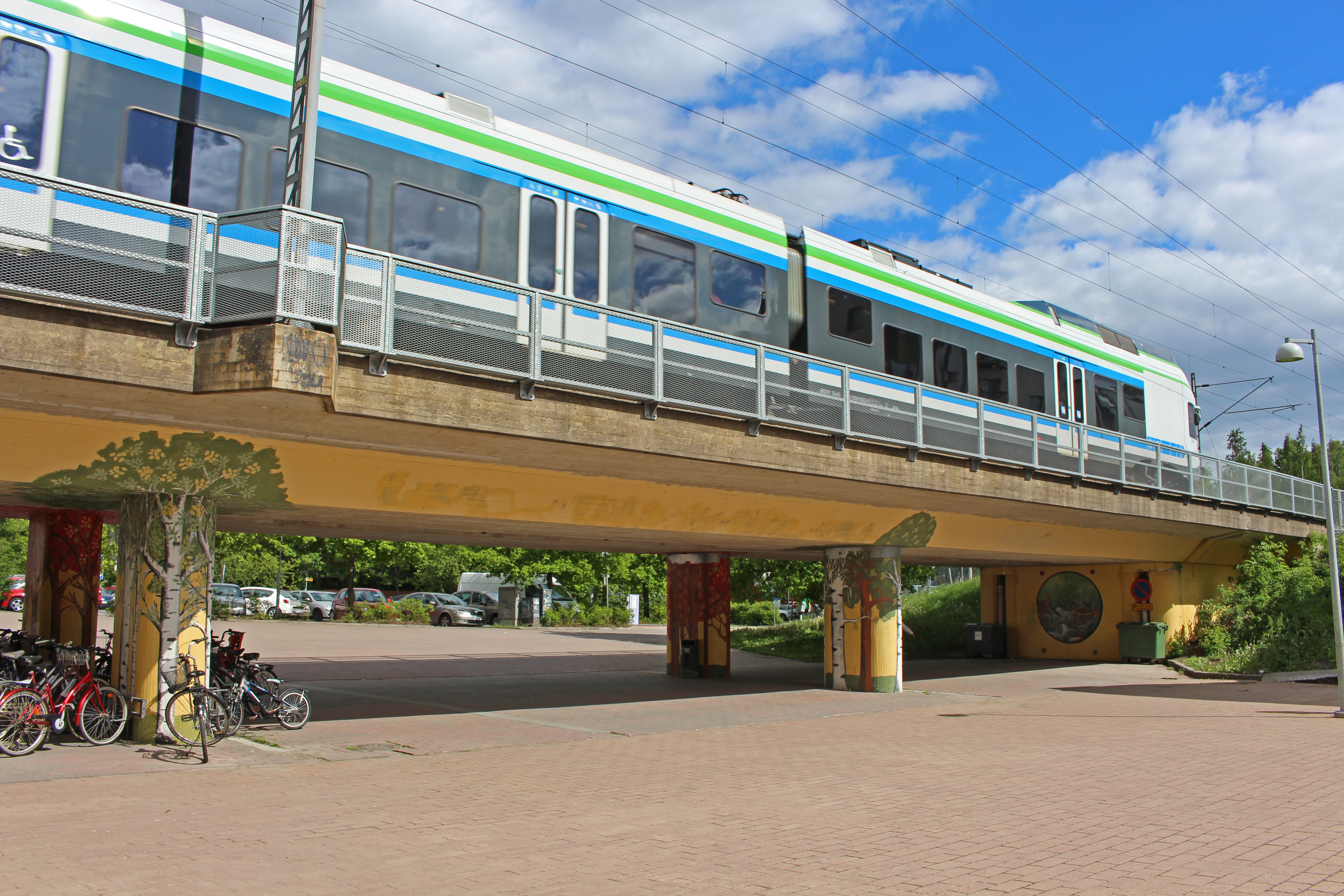
Malminkartano Railway Station

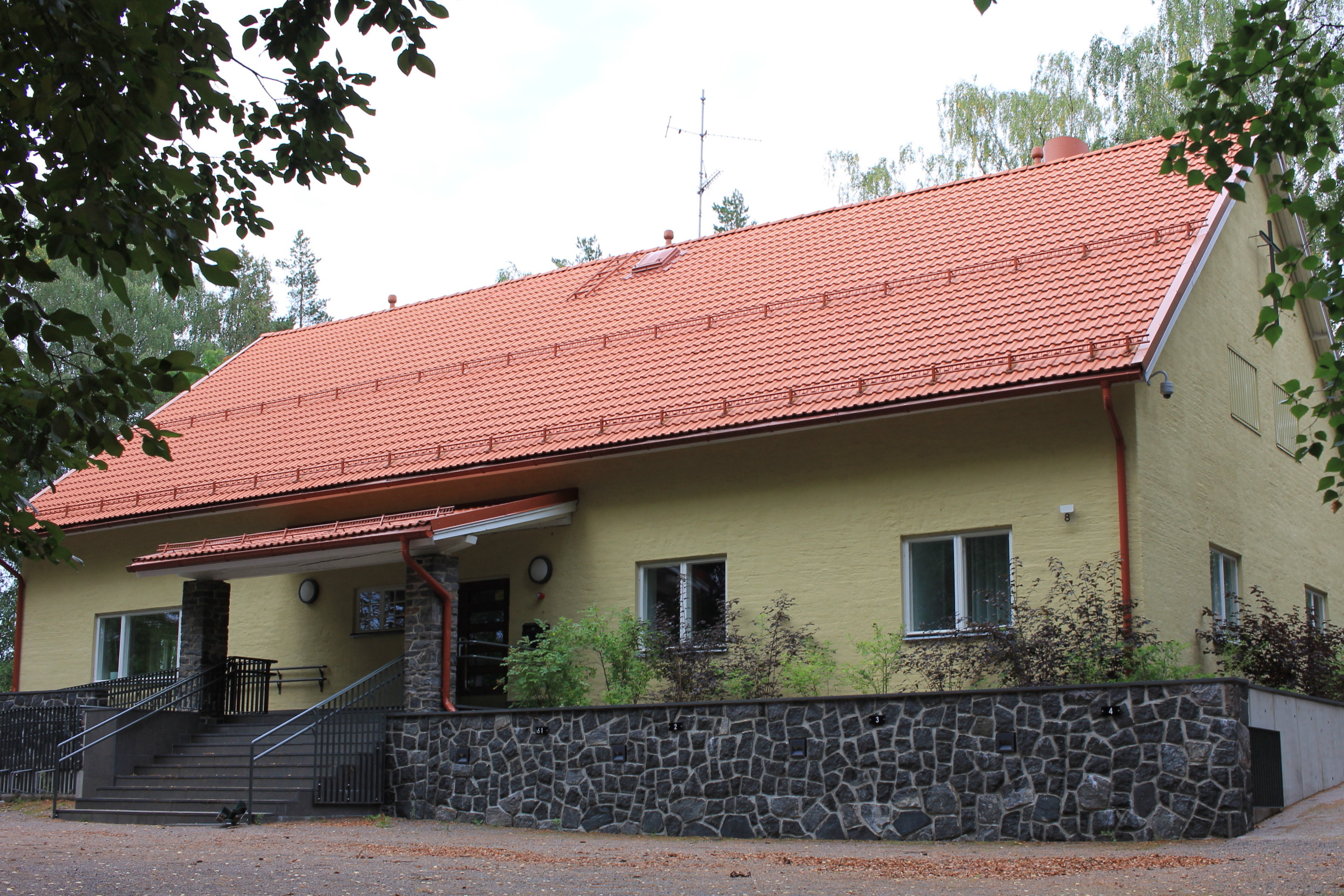
Malminkartano Chapel

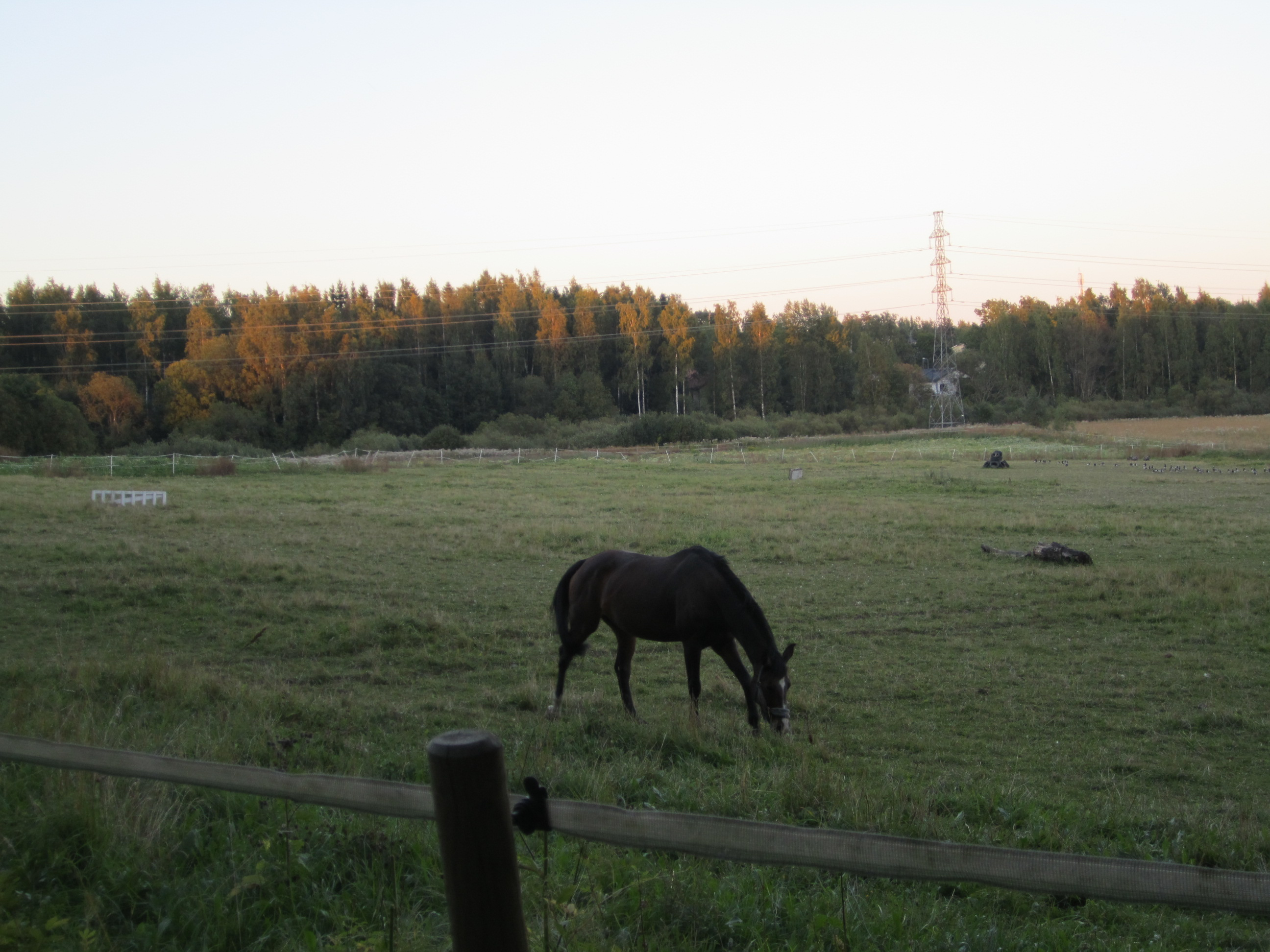
Malminkartano’s horse stable

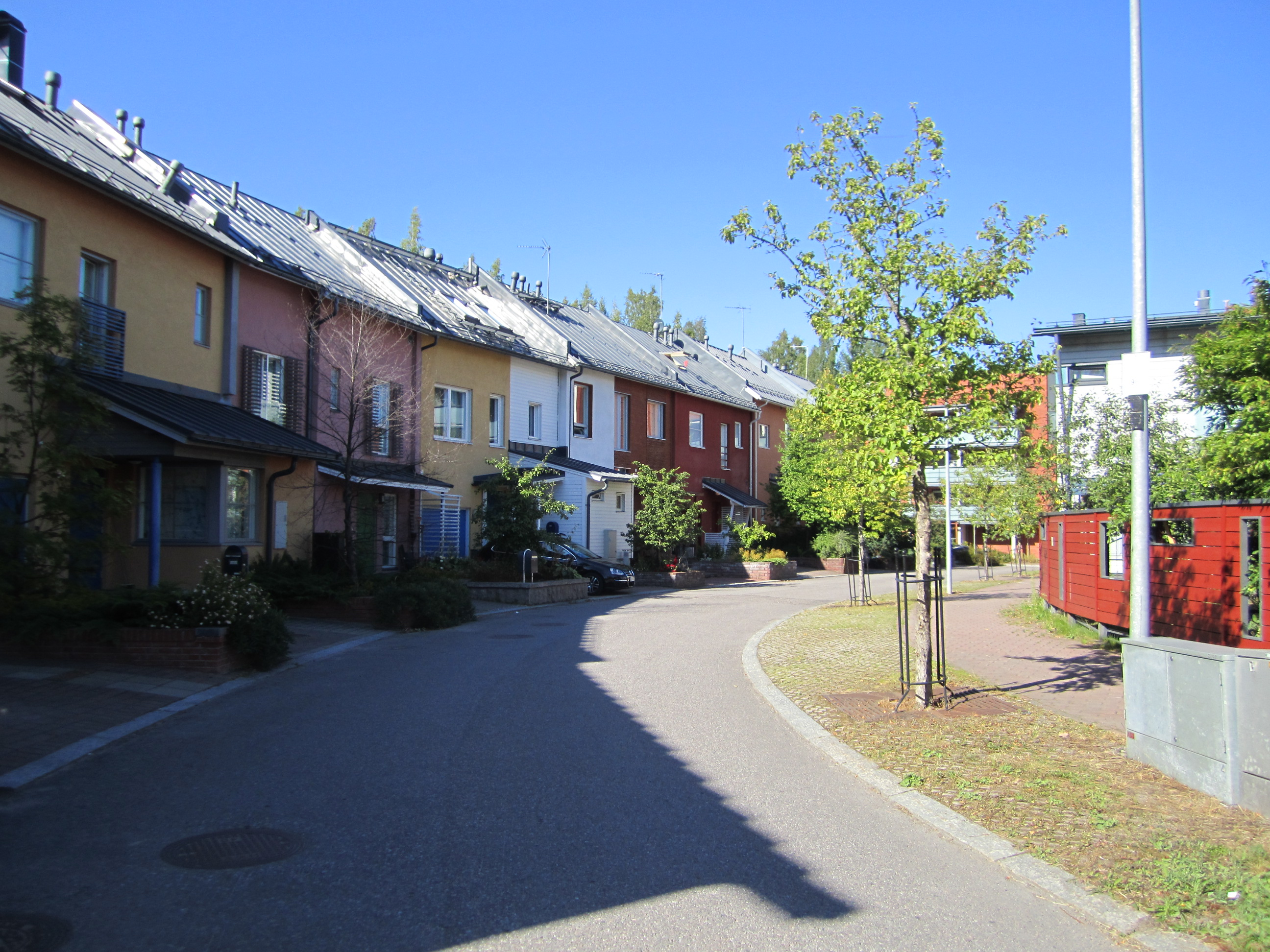
Houses in Malminkartano

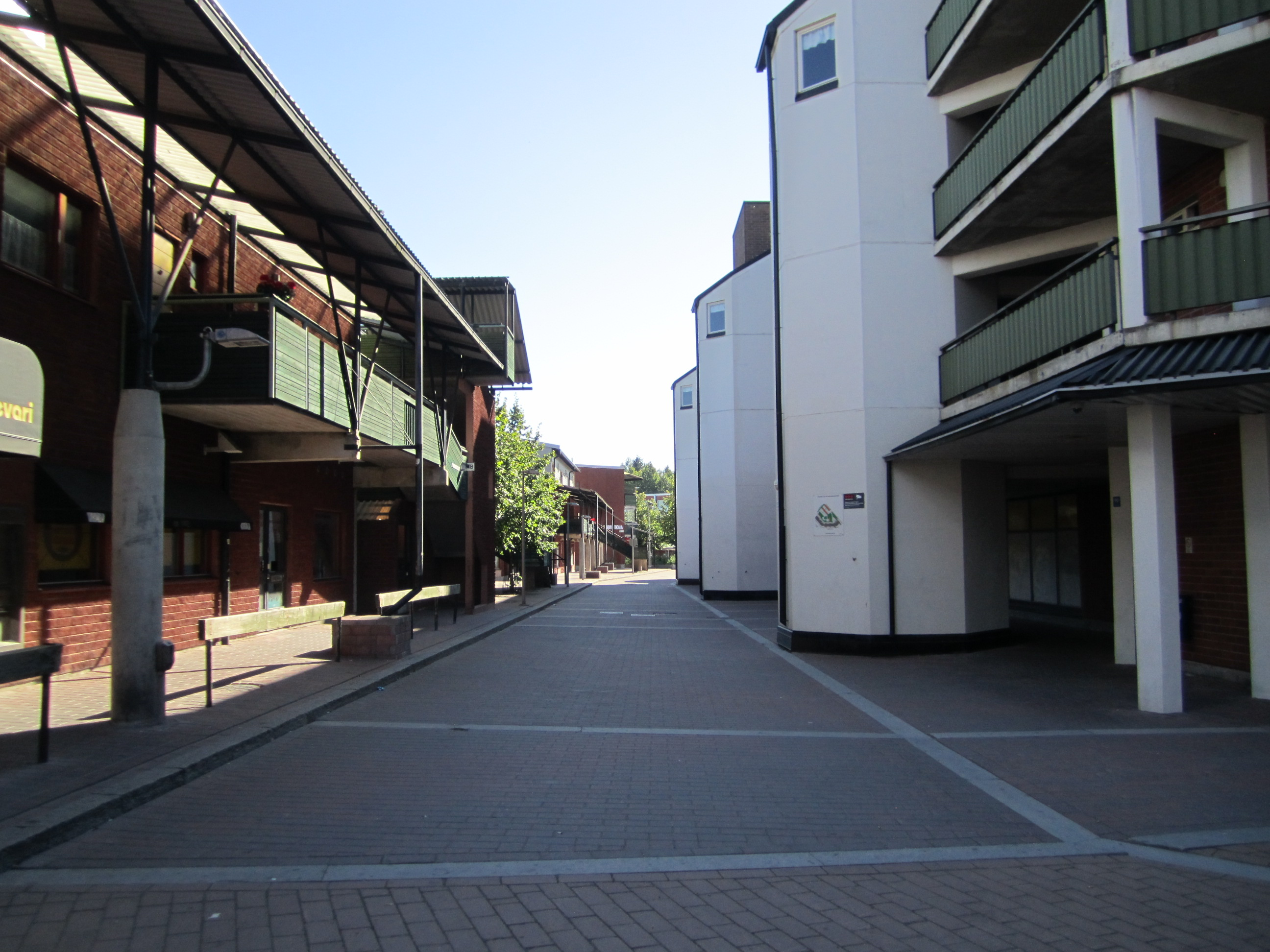
Street in Malminkartano
