= Pasila Rail Tunnel =

Former railway tunnel in Helsinki, Finland

Pasila rail tunnel
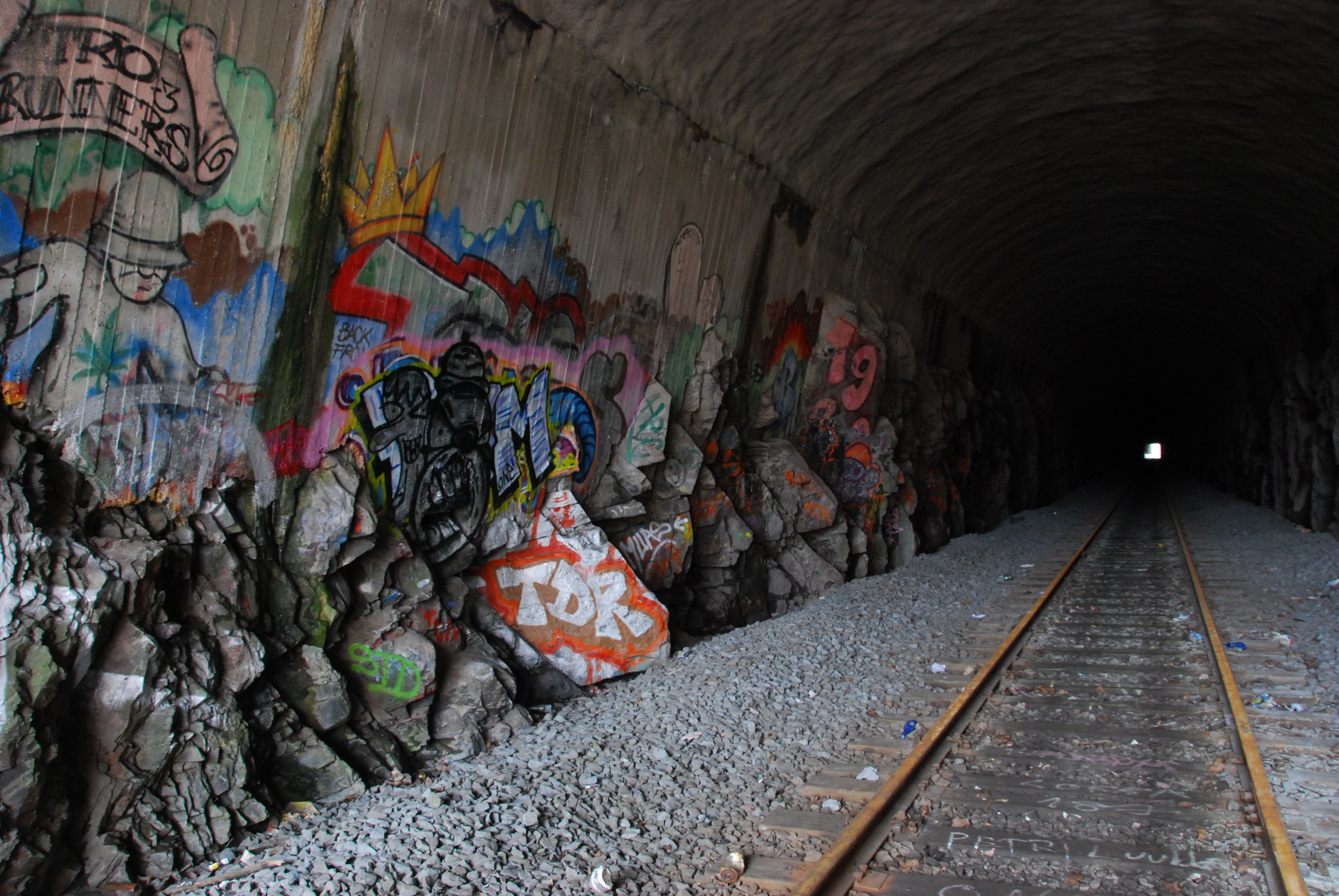
- The tunnel abandoned in 2009.
- Interactive map of Pasila rail tunnel

Overview
- Other names: Vallila Rail Tunnel; Kumpula Rail Tunnel
- Line: Sörnäinen harbour rail
- Status: Abandoned (2008–2021), indoor running track since 2021
- Crosses: Itä-Pasila
- Start: near Pasila railway station (the former classification yard)
- End: Vallilanlaakso (Vallila)

Operation
- Constructed: 1960s
- Opened: 1965
- Closed: November 2008 (traffic ended)

Technical
- Length: 650 metres (2,130 ft)

Pasila Rail Tunnel is a former 650-meter railway tunnel under Itä-Pasila residential area in Helsinki, Finland. It used to serve as part of the Sörnäinen harbour rail from 1965 to 2008. The west end of the tunnel located near Pasila railway station and ended up in Vallila in the east.

The decision to build the tunnel came from the need for a more durable and less interrupted way from Pasila to Sörnäinen Harbour (today's Kalasatama). The railway built in 1863 ran directly along today's Teollisuuskatu. As the street was built, narrower at that time, the rail traffic soon became troublesome in the area. The new route was established through Vallilanlaakso and Kyläsaari, with the 650-meter (2,130 ft) tunnel included.

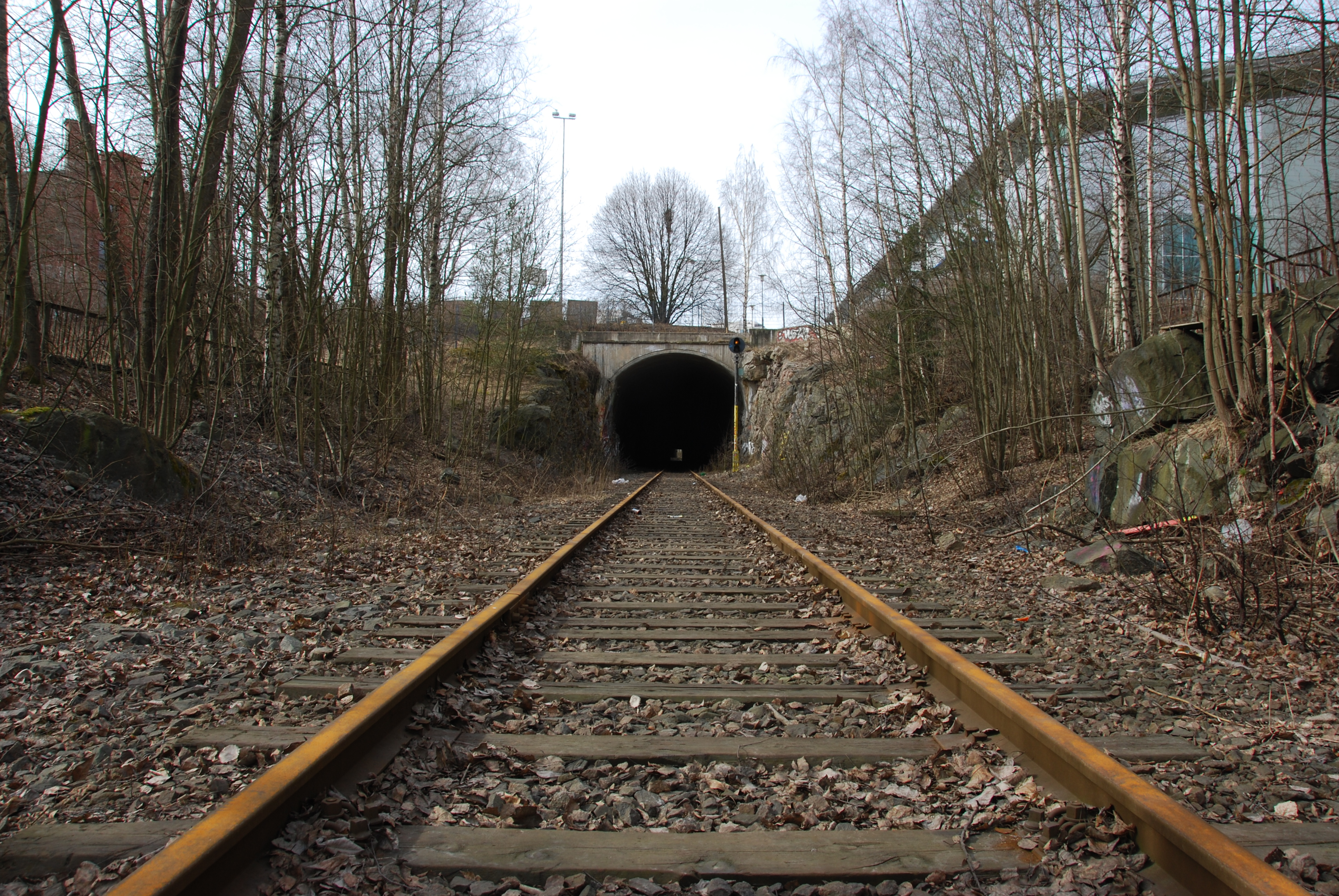
The tunnel portal in Vallila in 2009

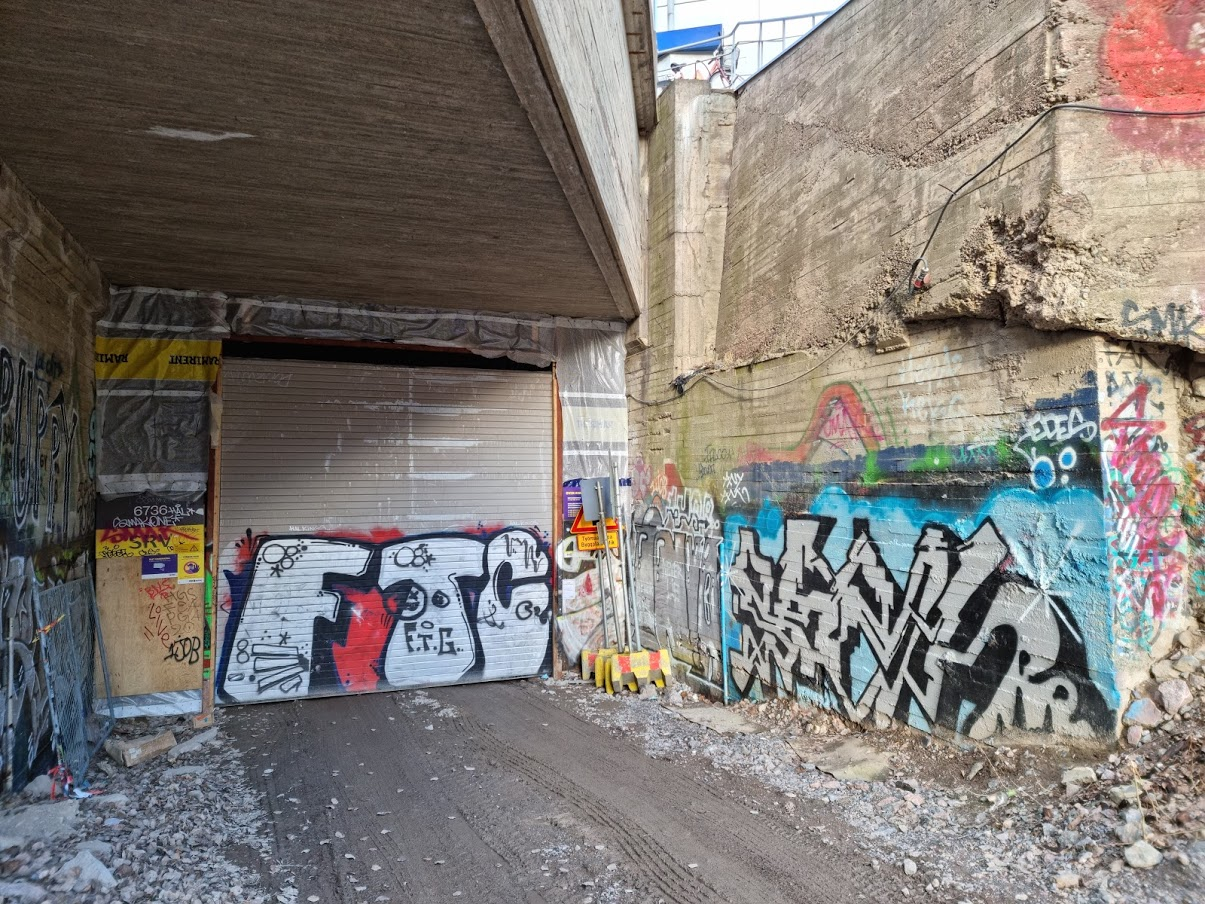
The tunnel shut in Itä-Pasila in 2021

== Reuse ==
The harbour railway was dismantled in 2009–2010, though the tunnel remained walkable for almost a decade after. An initiative was made for the tunnel to be renovated into a cycling tunnel, similar to Baana in the city centre, but the idea was soon shot down by the city planners. The tunnel remained abandoned until 2020 when the eastern entrance was shut and notable renovation started to turn part of the tunnel into a 138-metre-long (151 yd) indoor running track. The track, as part of the new Urhea campus, was opened in summer 2021.
