= Helsinki Televisio =

Former Finnish television station

Helsinki Televisio Oy (abbreviated HTV, until 1978 Helsingin Kaapelitelevisio) was a Helsinki-based company providing cable television services, the first of its kind in Finland. Between 1975 and 1980, it also produced its own programmes, and, from 1982, started relaying satellite television channels into its network. Later it added internet services, for which it used the Welho brand beginning in 2000. The company was acquired by Sanoma in 1981, and was incorporated into its SW Television subsidiary in 2006. Later, it was sold to DNA Oyj, where it operated as DNA Welho. Its studios, offices and satellite earth station were located at Asemapäällikönhovi, in eastern Pasila.

== History ==
=== Early years and own broadcasts ===
Cable television emerged in Finland in Pietarsaari/Jakobstad in 1972, but it wasn't until 1973 when Helsingin Kaapelitelevisio Oy (HKTV) was founded as the first cable television company in the country to begin its broadcasts. Politicians from several parties recommended its creation as an alternative to Yleisradio. This was possible thanks to a loophole in the radio law: since broadcasting was done using wires instead of radio transmitters, no government license was needed. The organisations that gave the most support were the Economics Information Bureau and the Finnish Industry Forum, founded a little later in 1974. Its founding shareholders included banks, insurance companies, state-owned enterprises, politically-aligned media outlets such as Uusi Suomi and the Educational Business Fund. Test broadcasts began on 22 May 1975 and regular broadcasts followed in December of that year. Initially, the cable network only covered a few hundred residences in the East Pasila district, and its broadcasts were made from the cellar of an apartment building at Asemapäällikönkatu 7. The TV studio was eventually located at the cellar of the Asemapäällikönhovi building, completed in 1976, in the same street. Mayor Teuvo Aura inaugurated the studio in December 1976.

HKTV was the first commercial television company in Finland to be independent from Yleisradio's transmitter network (at the time consisting of two channels) since the closure of Tesvisio in 1964, thus receiving national attention in spite of having a small audience. The political left criticised the company for representing a counter-movement of large capital to Yleisradio's operations and for its operations being seen as a way to evade the law. Its CEO was Jouko Castrén and the president of its council was Veikko Sjöblom. Its corporate name changed to Helsinki Televisio Oy in 1978.

In its early years, HTV produced its own programming, with music and current affairs programmes. From 1978, it provided three channels, (H)elsinki, T(ieto) and V(iihde), with the first two being basic channels. Elokuvia ja sarjoja esittänyt Viihde, which aired films and TV series, was Europe's first subscription television channel. The two basic channels also delivered news from Helsinki and its municipalities, shown during the week, as well as evening events from citizens, held by neighbourhood organisations in the city. From September 1978, HTV started producing its own news bulletins during weeknights, being the first time since the closure of Tesvisio that Yle's news service had a competitor. Although it had a few thousand viewers, HTV's news bulletin was seen as a sort of "test laboratory" when there were heated debated for Mainos-TV to have its own newscast. MTV subsequently gained a licence to broadcast a news bulletin in 1981. Pekka Karhuvaara, who was HTV's head of news, later continued his career on MTV.

=== Later developments ===
Due to low ratings, advertisers had no interest in HTV, which caused it to show years of financial losses. In June 1980, as a consequence of these events, the news bulletin was discarded and all original programming ended at the end of the year. After that, the cable company only aired sponsored programming, foreign movies and TV series. The Sanoma Group acquired a majority share in HTV in 1981. In the next year, HTV started delivering satellite television channels into its cable network, again, being the first in Europe. The first foreign channel it distributed was Satellite Television (later Sky Channel). In 1984, its cable network had a reach of over 100,000 subscribers. The original decoders were reaplced in 1986 by set-top-boxes. Helsinki Media founded Suomen paikallis-tv-kanavat Oy, or PTV, a national channel, which began its coverage on the HTV network in early 1990. It then reached a maximum of 600,000 households in 20 locations. PTV closed down in 1997, when Nelonen was created.

HTV also started offering internet services in the 1990s. Cable modem services were launched in 1997. Both internet and broadband services were marketed under the Welho brand from 2000 Welho. Sanoma-WSOY decided to merge HTV, Nelonen and Tuotantalo WErne in 2006 into a single company, SW Television Oy, and started using the Welho brand for all of HTV's operations. It became a part of the DNA company in 2010.

HTV's former studios at Asemapäällikönhovi were used by Tuotantotalo Werne in the 2000s. Since 2016, they are used by Suora Broadcast (previously Streamteam Nordic Oy), which it acquired from Werne.
