= Itä-Pasila =

Coordinates: 60.199°N 24.938°E

Itä-Pasila Östra Böle
- Helsinki Subdivision
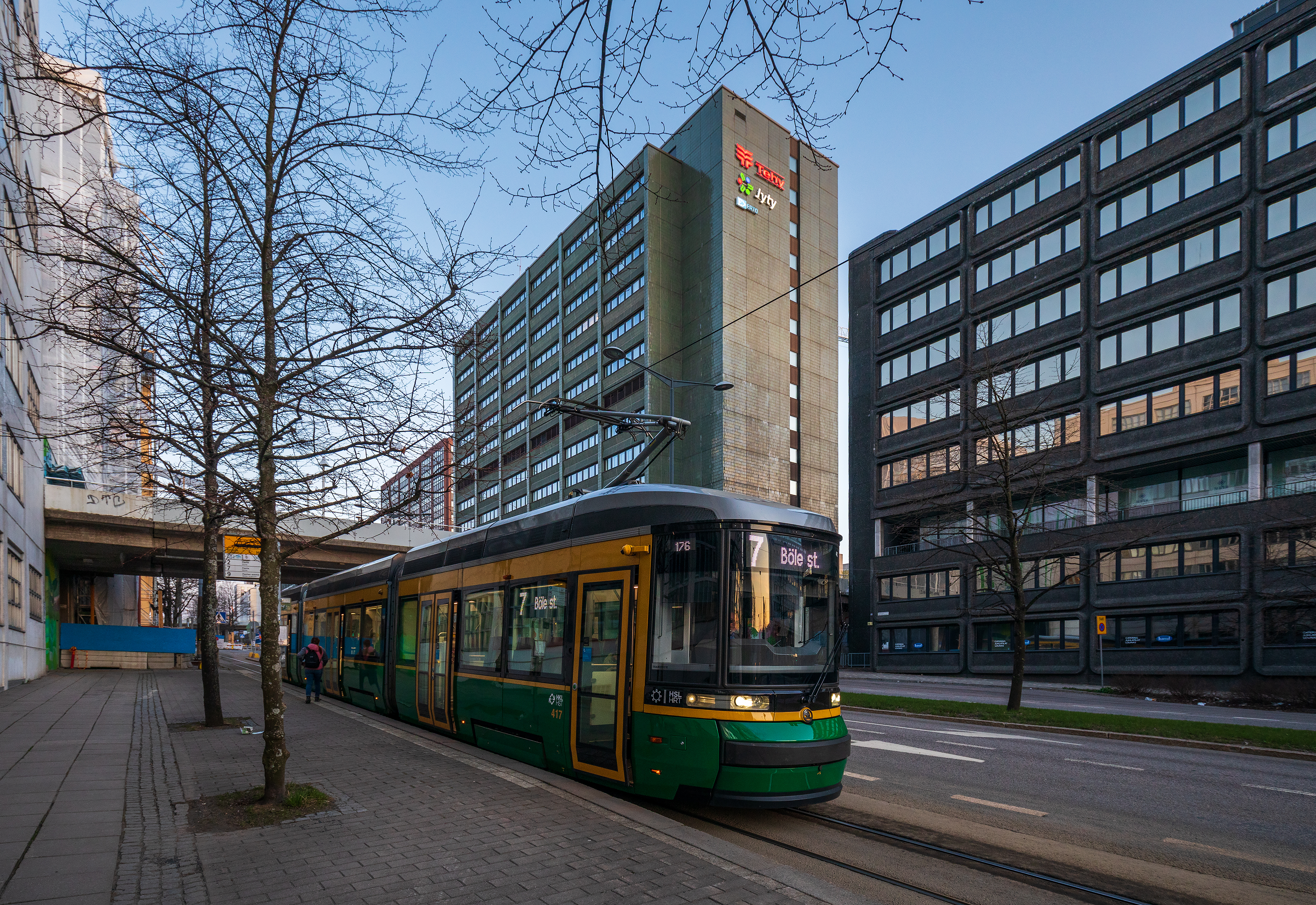

- Position of Itä-Pasila within Helsinki
- Country: Finland
- Region: Uusimaa
- Sub-region: Greater Helsinki
- Municipality: Helsinki
- District: Central
- Area: 0.92 km^{2} (0.36 sq mi)
- Population: 3,833
  - Density: 4,166/km^{2} (10,790/sq mi)
- Postal codes: 00230, 00240, 00520
- Subdivision number: 173

Itä-Pasila (Finnish), Östra Böle (Swedish) is a neighborhood in the Pasila subdivision of Helsinki, Finland.

It is known for its brutalist architecture, was built in the 1970s and 1980s. It is a highly mixed-use area of offices, flats and commercial spaces, built in the 1970s and 1980s. In terms of urban planning the most distinct feature of the area is its pedestrian-friendly design, based around a raised, pedestrian-only podium that connects to all buildings. Master planning of the area was led by Reijo Jallinoja and was based on his 1967 thesis work. The area is home to about 5,000 residents and 11,000 workplaces. Notable institutions include Helsinki Business College, Haaga–Helia University of Applied Sciences, the Helsinki City Theatre company, the main library of the city and Finland's largest convention center, Messukeskus. The area is a telecom and media center of national significance with the headquarters of telecom operator Elisa and a major presence of telecom operator DNA, who also own the TV studios at the Asemapäällikönhovi building, operated by Streamteam Nordic. The area is home to Helsinki's most vibrant street-art scene as well as the Helsinki Urban Art center, the international hub for street art in Finland.
