= Messukeskus Helsinki =

Convention center in Helsinki, Finland

Coordinates: 60°12′11″N 024°56′09″E

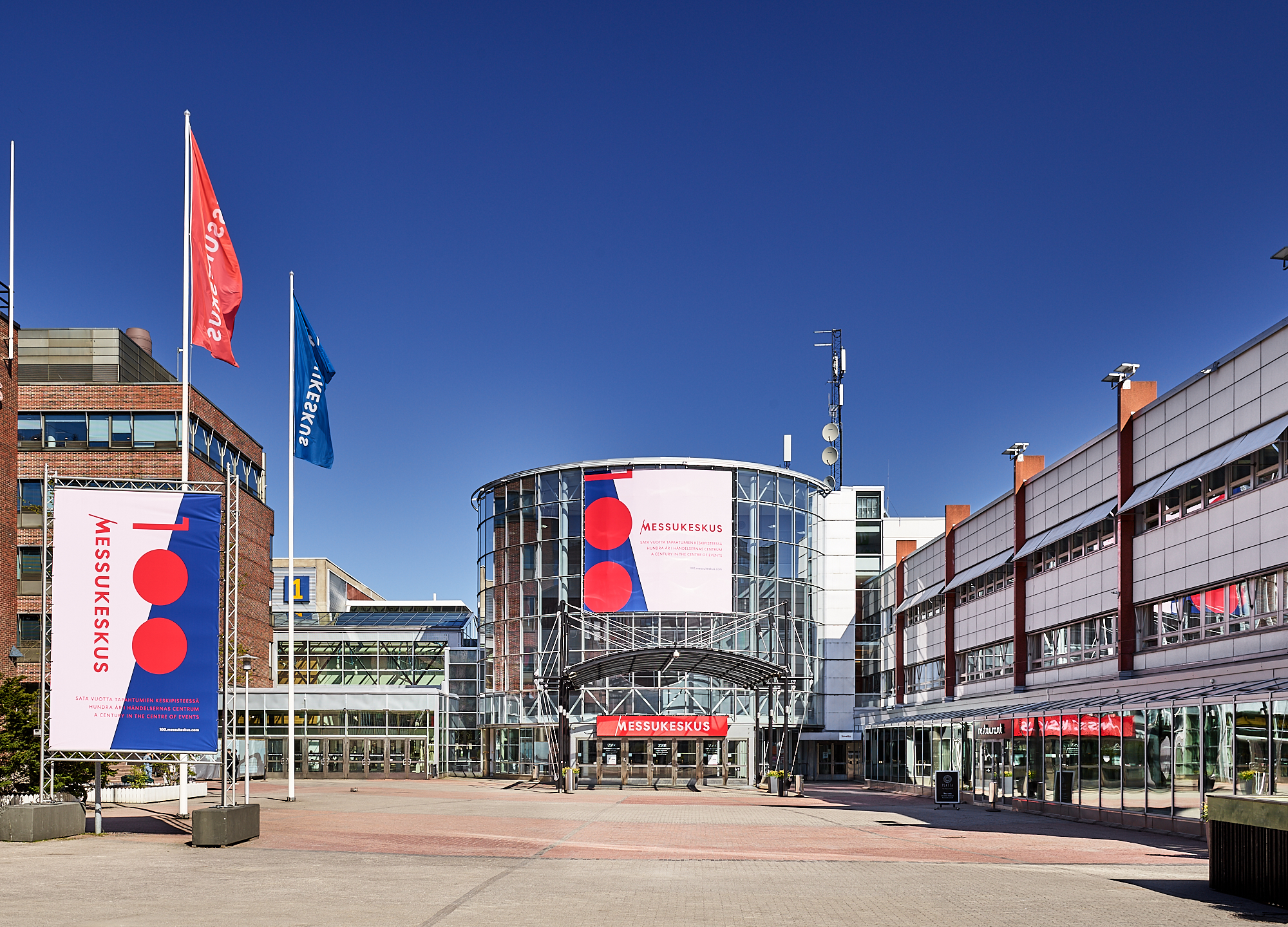
Helsinki Fair Centre

Messukeskus Helsinki, Expo and Convention Centre (formerly Helsinki Fair Centre) is the biggest and best-known convention center in Finland. It is located in the capital city of Helsinki, in the district of Pasila, a short walk northwards from the Pasila railway station.

Messukeskus Helsinki organizes exhibitions, meetings, conferences and other events: each year about a hundred different trade shows and public fairs and over 2,200 meetings and congresses. The largest regularly occurring exhibitions are Matka Nordic Travel Fair, The International Boat Show, and the Helsinki Book Fair. The centre has over one million annual visitors.

The premises of Messukeskus Helsinki include seven exhibition halls, 40 meeting rooms and the 4,400-seat Amfi Hall auditorium. There is a Holiday Inn hotel located immediately next to the centre.

== History ==
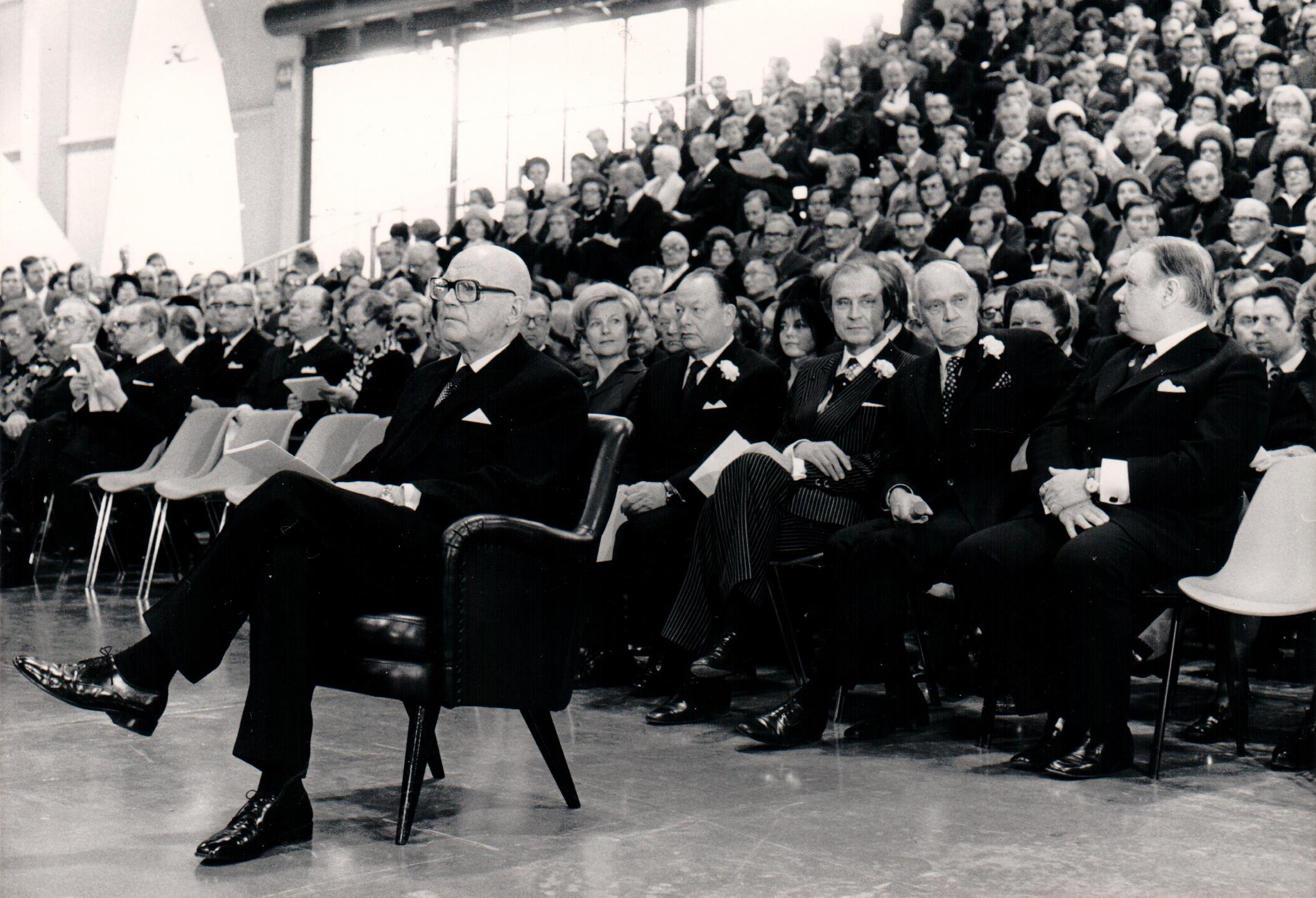
President of Finland Urho Kekkonen attended the opening ceremony of the current premises of Messukeskus Helsinki in 1975.

Messukeskus Helsinki is owned by The Finnish Fair Corporation, which was founded on 19 October 1919 to promote Finnish trade and industry and to boost confidence in domestic production opportunities after the turbulent years of gaining independence. The first fair was held in the summer of 1920 in the field next to St John's Church in Helsinki. The fair became a huge festival with more than 120,000 visitors and nearly 1000 exhibitors. Professionally organised fairs established themselves in Finland right away. Just one year later, in 1921, the next event was considerably more commercial in nature than the first fair.

In 1935, the Finnish Fair Corporation had own premises built in Helsinki's Töölö district. When finished, Messuhalli hall (now known as Kisahalli) on main road Mannerheimintie was the largest exhibition venue in the Nordic region. It was the exhibition base for four decades.

Then-president Urho Kekkonen drove the first stake for the current premises in October 1973. In 1975, the company moved into the completed building in Itä-Pasila.

== See also ==
- Tampere Fair Centre
- Wanha Satama, a smaller exhibition centre in the district of Katajanokka
