= Sörnäinen harbour rail =

Dismantled railway in Helsinki, Finland

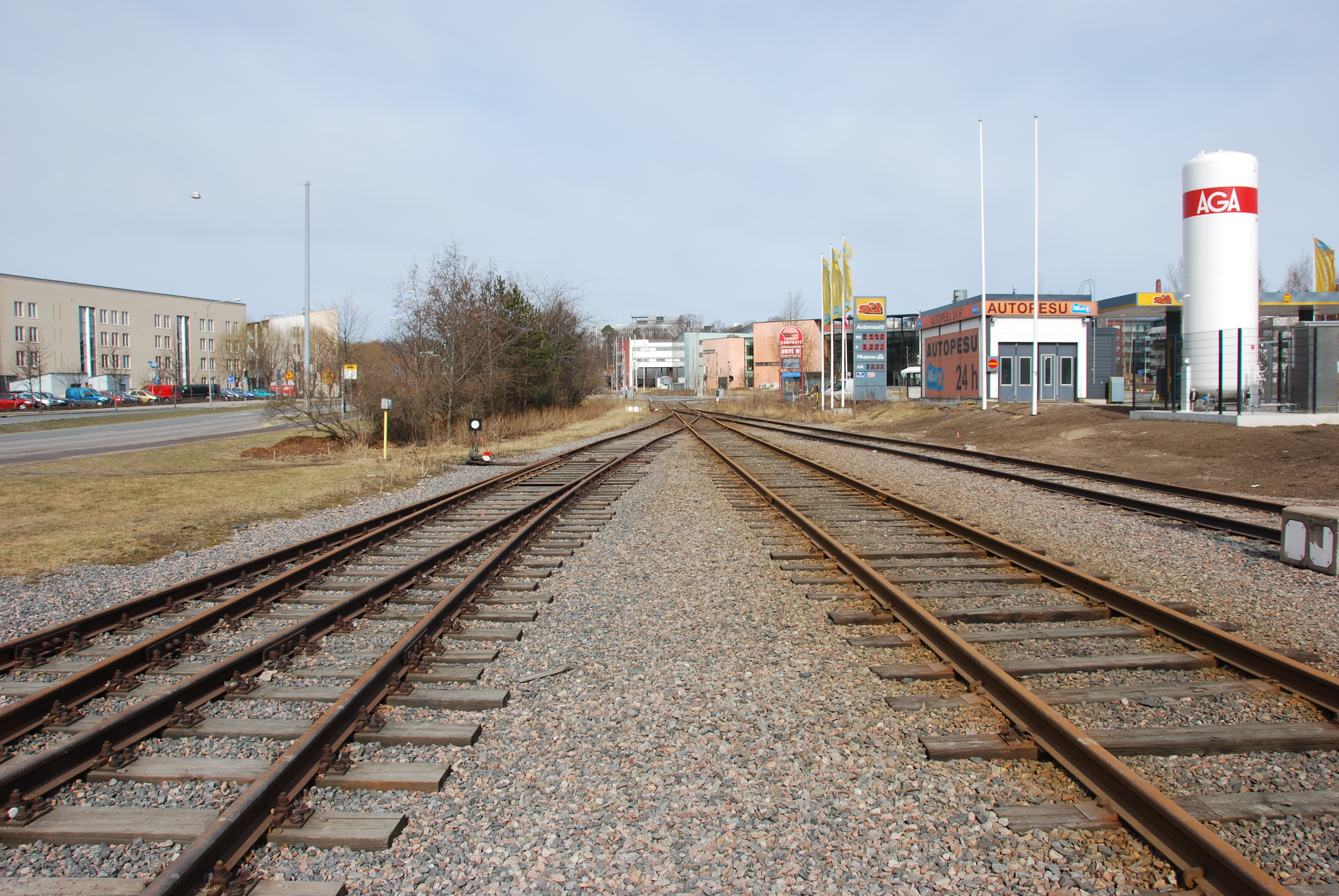
Tracks next to Hermannin rantatie street. The passage was later turned into tram line (Kalasatama–Pasila).

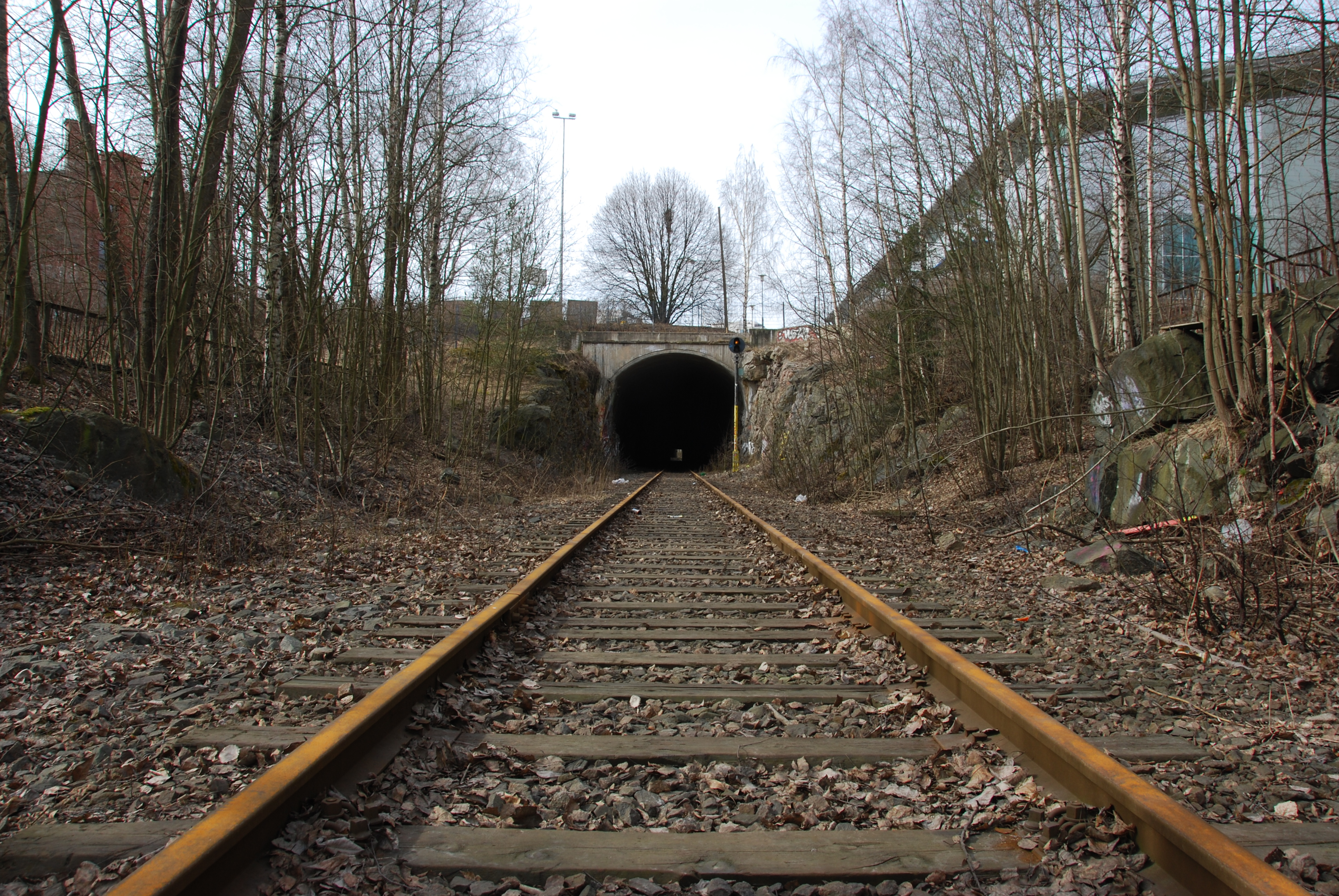
Pasila Rail Tunnel in 2009.

The Sörnäinen harbour rail line (Finnish: Sörnäisten satamarata) was a side rail track in Helsinki, Finland, built in the 1860s, and dismantled in 2009–2010. It was opened in 1863, a year after Finland's first railway line Helsinki–Hämeenlinna. The harbour rail ran from Pasila railway station to Sörnäinen Harbour to serve the port facilities. Originally the line was 3.37 kilometres (2.09 mi) long, running through today's Teollisuuskatu in Vallila, but in 1965 it was re-routed around the inner city area via Pasila Rail Tunnel and Kumpula.

The track was mainly used by trains going to the harbour, but since 1901 it was branched all the way south to Hakaniemi market square.

Sörnäinen Harbour was closed down after 145 years of operation in November 2008, when the new Vuosaari Harbour was opened in the eastern suburb, and the facilities moved there. Since its closure, the area has been redeveloped for residential, retail and leisure use, as part of the Kalasatama development.

Another branch line, the 7 kilometres (4.3 mi) long Helsinki harbour rail was built in the 1890s. It led from the Central Station to the West Harbour and Katajanokka. The track was also dismantled in 2009 as all container traffic was moved to Vuosaari Harbour in 2008.
