= Haaga-Helia University of Applied Sciences =

Finnish university of applied sciences

- Haaga-Helia ammattikorkeakoulu Haaga-Helia yrkeshögskola
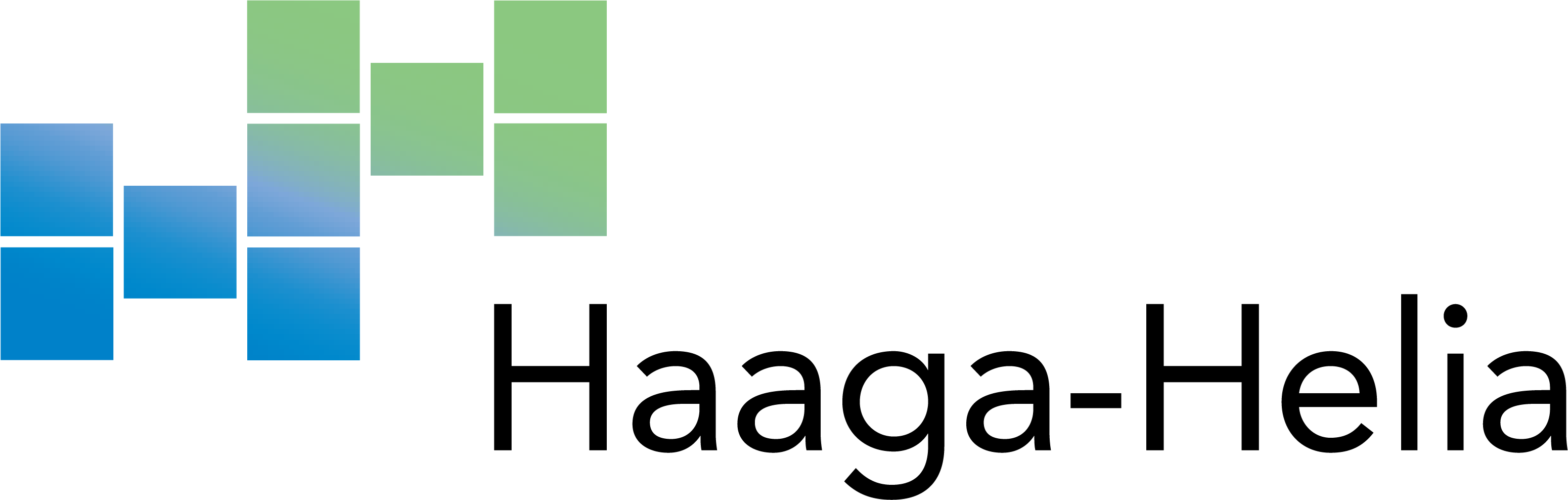
- Haaga-Helia logo
- Motto in English: Keys to competence excellence
- Type: Foundation
- Established: 2007
- President: Susanna Niinistö-Sivuranta
- Faculty: 700
- Students: ca. 11,000
- Location: Helsinki, Porvoo and Vierumäki , Finland
- Website: www.haaga-helia.fi/en

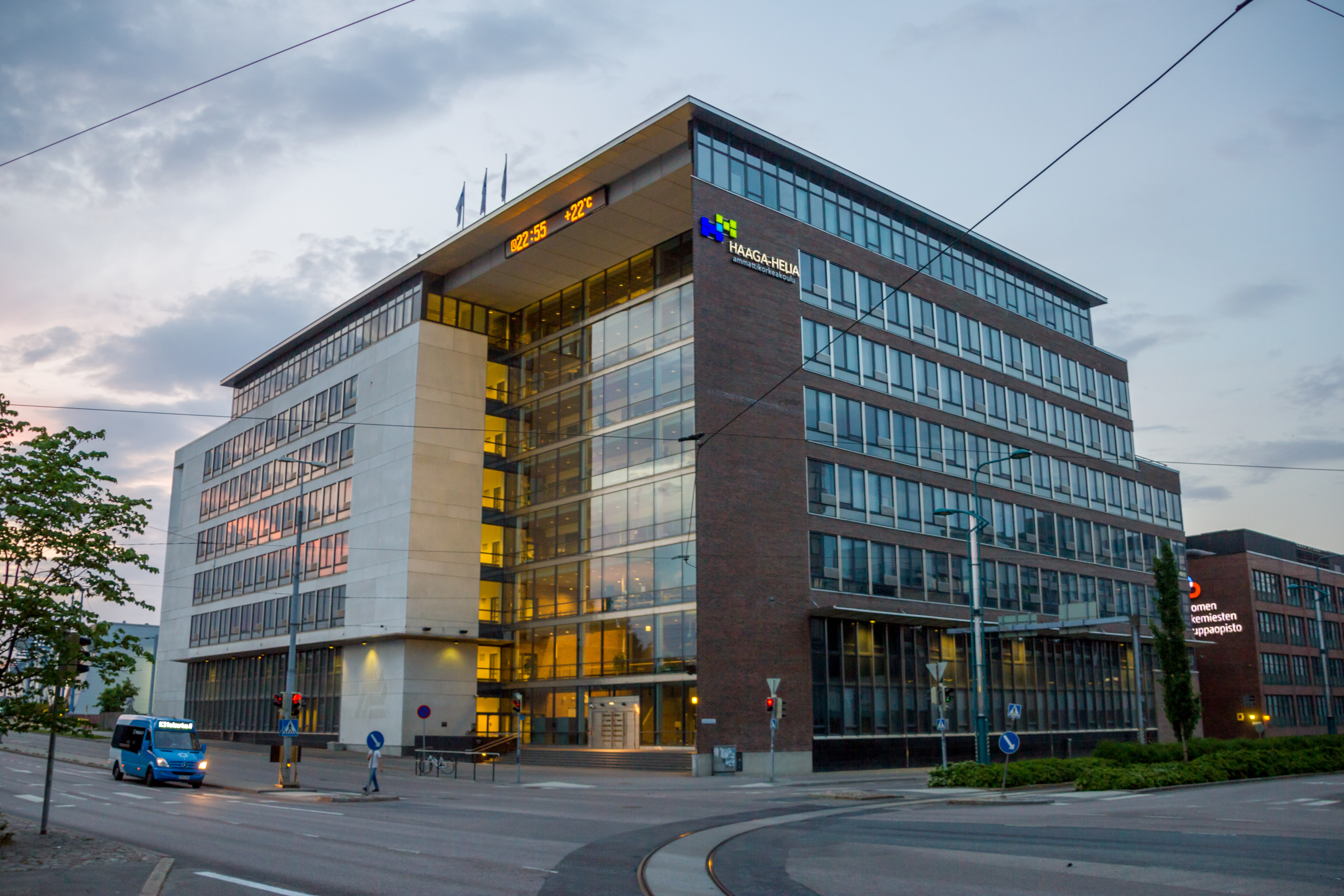
Haaga-Helia's main building in Pasila, Helsinki.

Haaga-Helia University of Applied Sciences (Finnish: Haaga-Helia ammattikorkeakoulu, Swedish: Haaga-Helia yrkeshögskola) is one of Finland's largest universities of applied sciences ("ammattikorkeakoulu" in Finnish). The institution is fully supervised and accredited by the Finnish government through the Ministry of Education and Culture. The university's primary facilities are in Pasila, Helsinki. It has other premises in Malmi (Helsinki), and in Porvoo and Vierumäki.

Haaga-Helia offers bachelor's and master's studies in business, information technology, sport and leisure management, hospitality management, journalism (in Finnish), and professional teacher education. It has about 11,000 students, of whom 1,300 are international students, and about 700 employees, of whom over 400 are full-time teachers. In business, Haaga-Helia is one of the largest educators in the Nordic countries.

Haaga-Helia's Student Union, which takes care of student advocacy and social and study-related interests, is called Helga.

== Fields of education and degree programmes ==
Haaga-Helia offers 30 degree programmes (in 2026), of which 16 lead towards a bachelor's degree and 14 towards a master's degree. 15 degree programmes are conducted fully in English.

=== Bachelor's degree programmes in English ===
Bachelor of Business Administration:

- Degree Programme in Aviation Business, Porvoo campus
- Degree Programme in Business Information Technology, Pasila campus
- Degree Programme in Digital Business Innovations, Porvoo campus
- Degree Programme in International Business, Pasila campus

Bachelor of Hospitality Management:

- Degree Programme in Hospitality and Tourism Experience Management, Pasila campus
- Degree Programme in Hospitality Operations Management, Pasila campus
- Degree Programme in Strategic Hospitality Management, online

Bachelor of Sports Studies:

- Degree Programme in Sports Coaching and Management, Vierumäki campus

=== Master's degree programmes in English ===
Master of Business Administration:

- Degree Programme in AI for Business Transformation, European Joint master's degree
- Double Degree Programme in Business Technologies and Management, Pasila campus and MCI The Entrepreneurial School, Innsbruck, Austria
- Degree Programme in Business Technologies, Pasila campus
- Degree Programme in Leading Business Transformation, Pasila campus
- Degree Programme in Strategising in Organisations, Virtual studies
- Degree Programme in Sustainable Aviation Business, Virtual studies

Master of Hospitality Management:

- Degree Programme in Service Business Management, Pasila campus

=== School of Professional Teacher Education ===
- Professional Teacher Education Programme, Pasila campus

=== Open University of Applied Sciences and continuous education ===
In addition to degree programmes, Haaga-Helia offers a wide range of continuing education services, thereby supporting lifelong learning and strengthening work-oriented skills. Haaga-Helia's continuing education offering covers Open University of Applied Sciences studies, further education, specialisation training, and customised training solutions for companies and other organisations.

At the Open University of Applied Sciences, you can develop your skills through individual courses and relevant skill sets. The offering includes courses for bachelor's and master's degrees. The studies are subject to a fee, but there are also courses available free of charge. There are approximately 4 600 students at Haaga-Helia's Open University of Applied Sciences (in 2026).

Haaga-Helia's School of Professional Teacher Education also provides a wide range of continuing education, such as solutions for developing the skills of educational institutions and companies and updating expertise.

Haaga-Helia also offers diverse and practical continuing professional development courses for companies and their employees. Continuing professional education courses can be short training sessions or longer training programmes tailored to companies.

== Research, development and innovation activities ==
Haaga-Helia develops new solutions and carry out applied research specially in its four research areas:

=== Digital transition & AI ===
Haaga-Helia helps businesses to prosper, and they renew their education in topics such as digital business, artificial intelligence, information systems and knowledge management. Haaga-Helia develops new solutions, acts as advisors to companies and performs applied research activities in the field of digitalization, data, and AI.

=== Service innovations and design ===
Haaga-Helias focuses on the broad development of service business and the promotion of an excellent customer experience in services. In research and development, Haaga-Helia focuses particularly on the sectors of travel, tourism, hospitality, sport, recreation, wellness and retail.

=== Pedagogy and learning ===
Haaga-Helia does research, development and innovation in pedagogy and learning in higher education, teacher education, vocational education and training and the world of work.

=== Entrepreneurship and business renewal ===
Haaga-Helia supports companies in the development of their operations by creating customised processes so they can effectively commercialise their new innovations. As interpreters of the future work life, Haaga-Helia also help companies in implementing change and updating competences.

== International cooperation ==
International cooperation is a core component of Haaga-Helia's strategy, supporting educational quality, innovation capacity, and global engagement. Haaga-Helia has over 200 international partner universities globally.

=== Ulysseus European University ===
Haaga-Helia is part of Ulysseus European University, which is one of the 68 European Universities selected by the European Commission to become the universities of the future. Led by the University of Seville together with seven other universities in Europe: University of Genoa, Italy; Université Côte d’Azur, France; Technical University of Košice, Slovakia; MCI Management Center Innsbruck, Austria; and Haaga-Helia University of Applied Sciences, Finland; University of Munster, Germany and University of Montenegro.

== Organisation ==
Haaga-Helia's President and CEO is Susanna Niinistö-Sivuranta, Vice Presidents are Minna Hiillos (Teaching, Learning and Professional Teacher Education), Salla Huttunen (RDI and Digitalisation) and Jouni Ahonen (Commercial and International Services).

=== Campuses ===
Haaga-Helia operates on five campuses: Pasila, Malmi, Haaga (all in Helsinki), Porvoo and Vierumäki. Haaga-Helia opens new learning and teaching facilities in the Mall of Tripla, in Helsinki, in August 2026.

=== Board ===
The Board governs and oversees Haaga-Helia's operations. The chairperson of the board is President, grocery trade, Ari Akseli. Other members of the board: Development Manager Kai Laikio (1. Deputy Chairperson of the board), CEO Timo Lappi (2. Deputy Chairperson of the board), Principal Lecturer Minna-Maari Harmaala, Manager Mirja Heiskari, Director Markku Lahtinen, Finance Director Pirjo van Nues, Student Laura Töykkälä, Unit Head Tiina Äijö, CEO of Haaga-Helia University of Applied Sciences Susanna Niinistö-Sivuranta, Director of Finance Virpi Peltoniemi (Board Secretary).

== History ==
Haaga-Helia University of Applied Sciences was established at the beginning of 2007, when Helsinki Business Polytechnic (Helia) and Haaga Institute Polytechnic merged and created a new university of applied sciences. At the time, there were approximately 6000 students in Helia and approximately 4000 in Haaga Institute. Haaga-Helia was the first university of applied sciences in Finland to launch an English-taught bachelor's degree programme in 1993 (Degree Programme in Hospitality Management).

== Audits and international accreditations ==
- Quality label, Finnish Education Evaluation Center FINEEC (2023-2029)
- Elite athlete friendly university audit, Finnish Olympic Committee (2023)
- EFMD Programme accredited, European Foundation for Management Development (2025)
- THE-ICE Committed to Quality (C2Q) certificate, The International Centre of Excellence in Tourism and Hospitality Education (2021)
- ICCE Full Endorsement, The International Council for Coaching Excellence (2021)
- European Approach for joint Ulysseus programme, AQAS Agency for Quality Assurance through Accreditation of Study Programs (2024)
- Member of AACSB, Association to Advance Collegiate Schools of Business (2011)

== See also ==
- Ammattikorkeakoulu
