= Teollisuuskatu =

Street in Helsinki, Finland

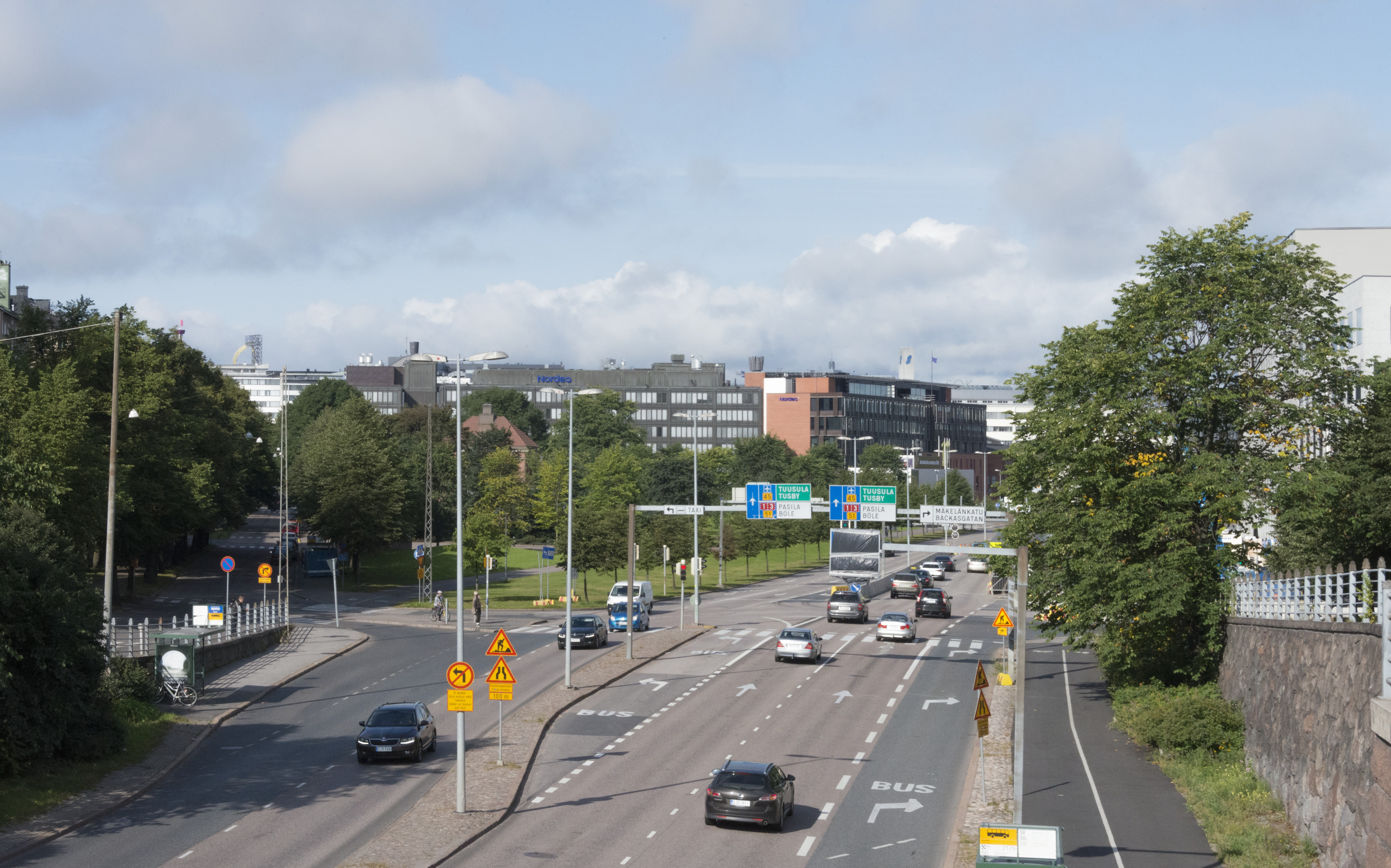
Teollisuuskatu viewed to the west from the Hämeentie bridge.

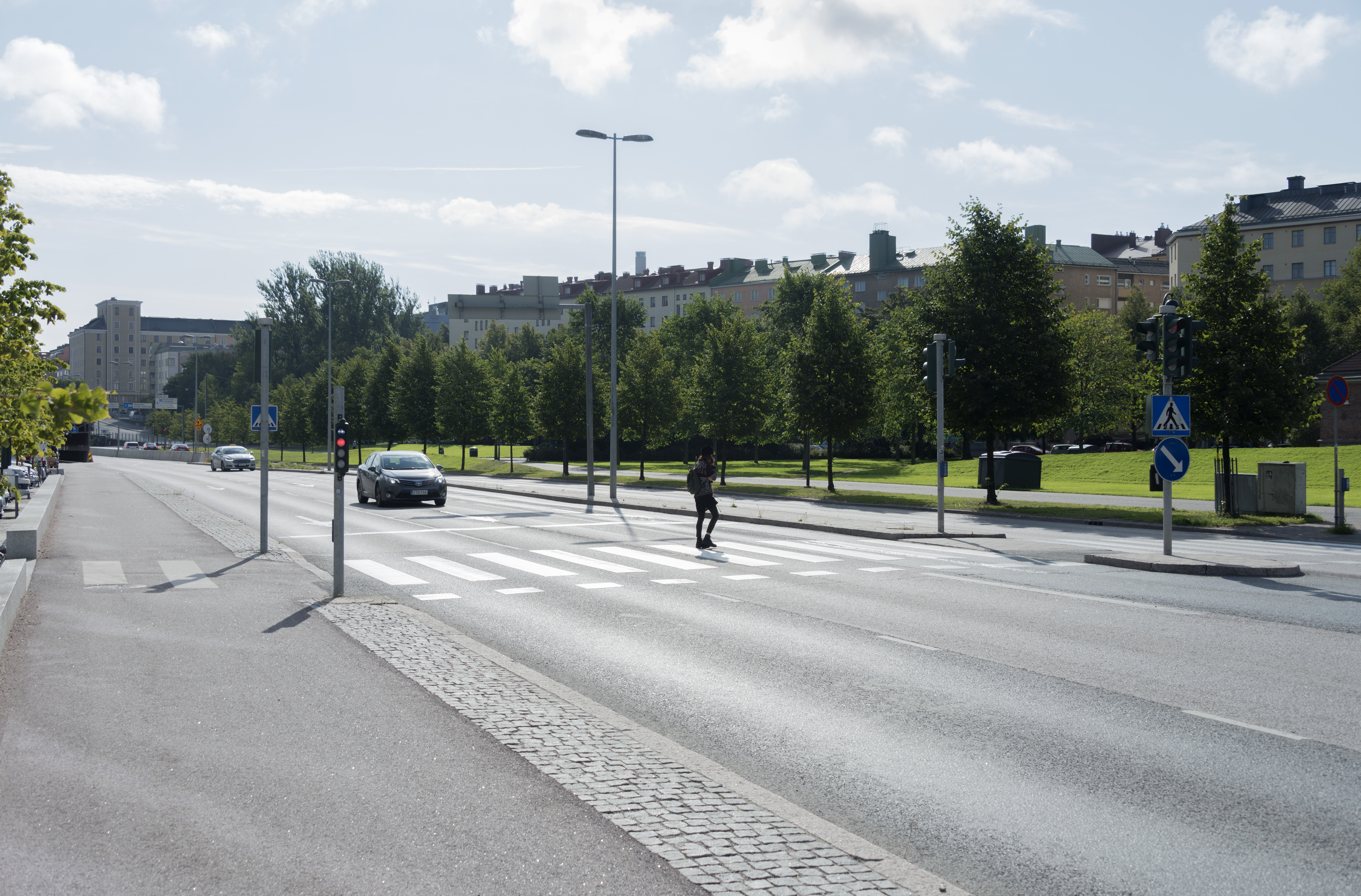
Teollisuuskatu to the east viewed from near the Dallapénpuisto park.

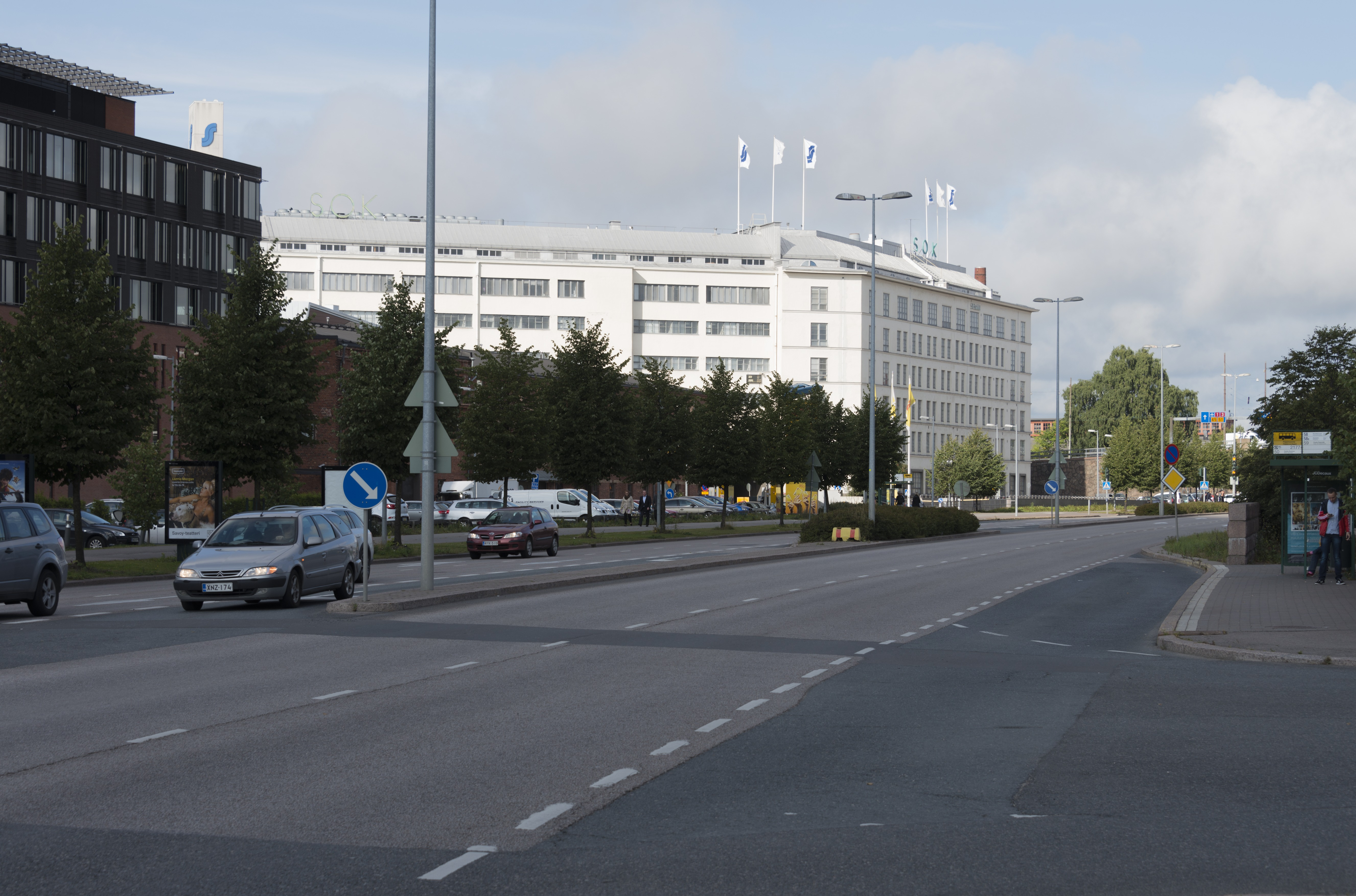
A view to the west. In the background is Ässäkeskus, the headquarters of the S Group.

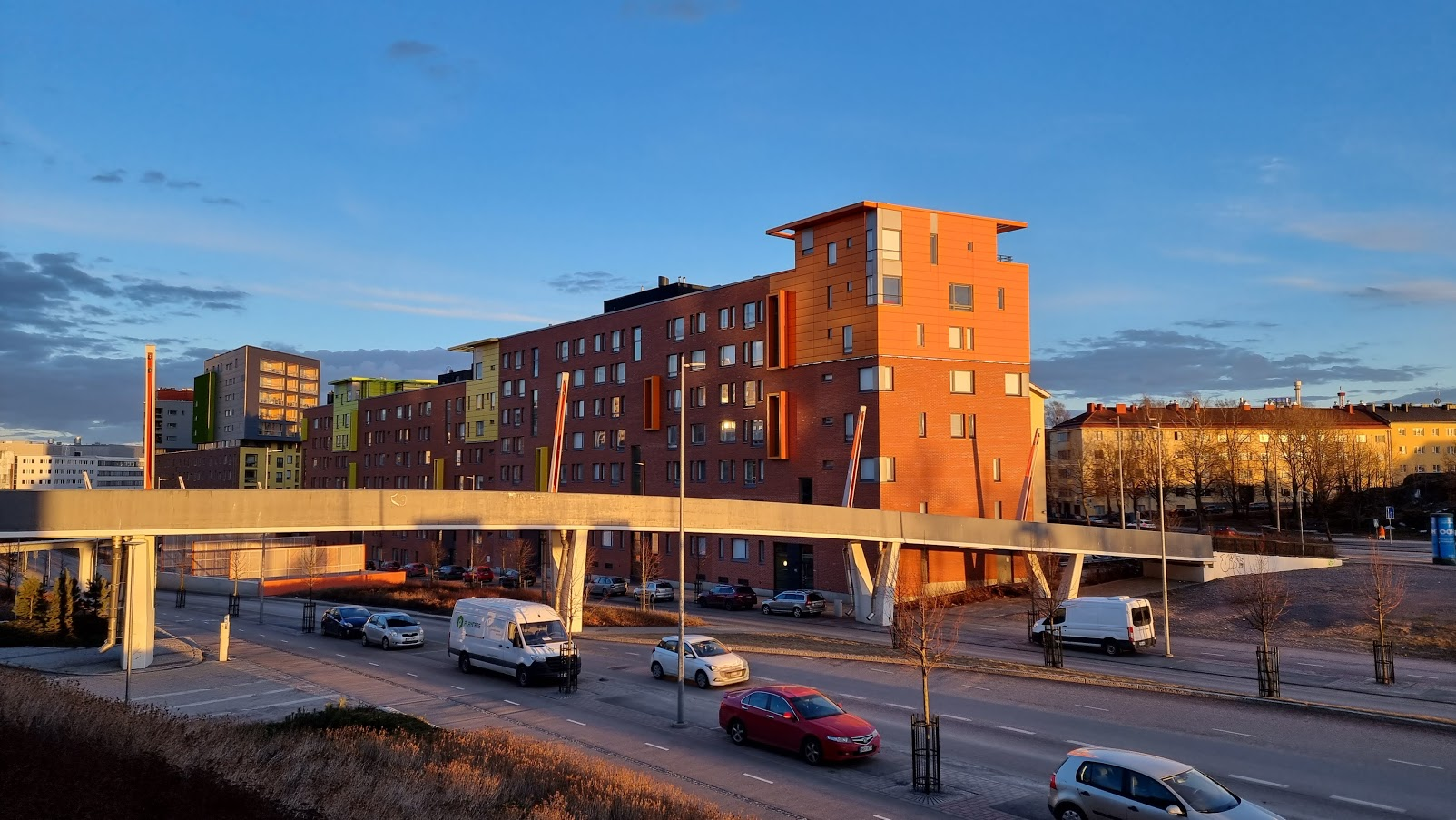
Houses in the Konepaja area at the west end of the street, built in the 2010s.

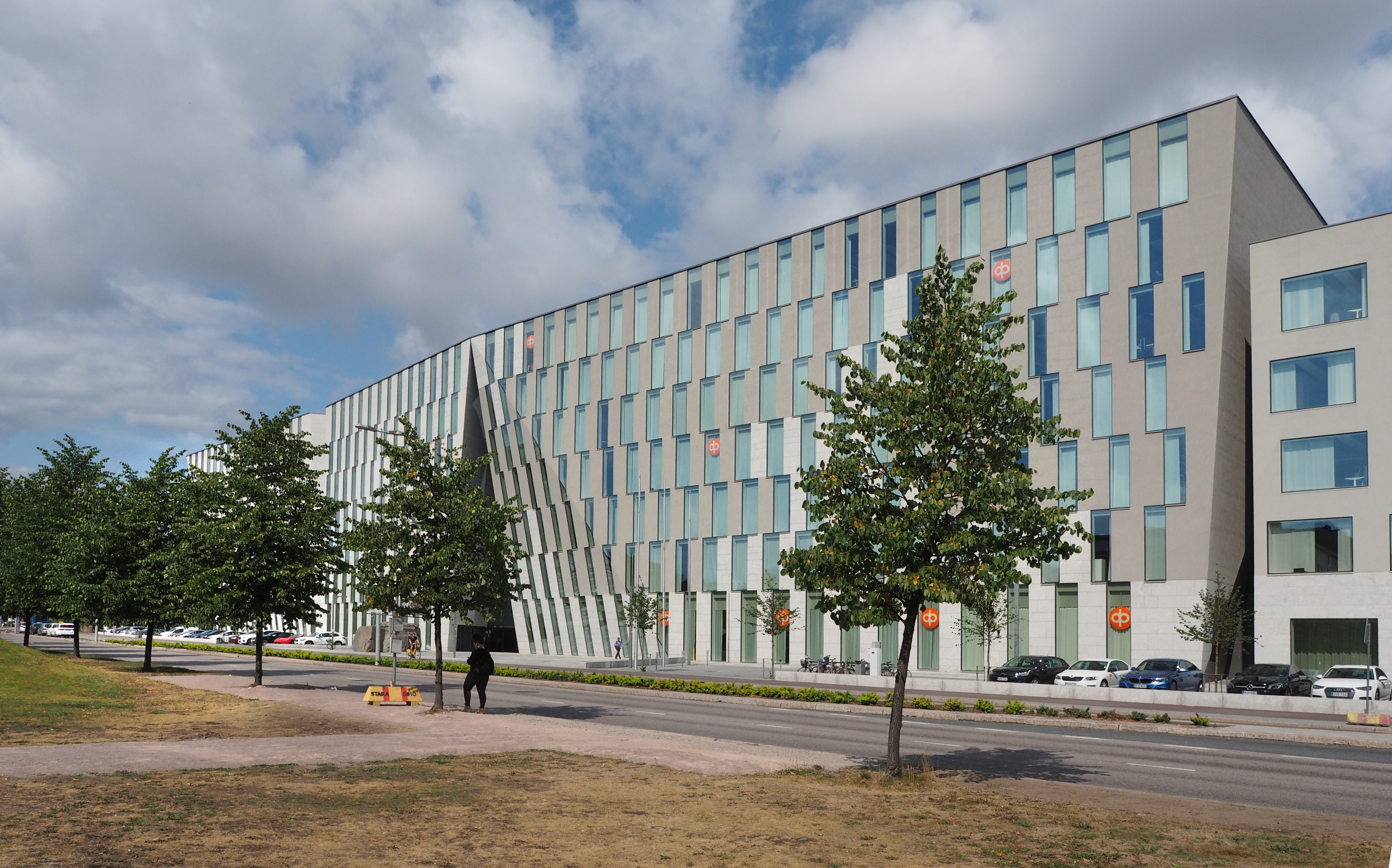
The headquarters of the OP Financial Group, built in 2015.

Teollisuuskatu (Swedish: Industrigatan), meaning "Industry street", is a street in the Vallila district of Helsinki, Finland. The street is the multi-lane main connection between Pasila and Kalasatama, used by about 20 thousand vehicles per day. The street, slightly resembling a highway, is at some places over 50 metres wide, and its speed limit is 50 kph.

Traffic over the valley-like passage is over bridges, and the street has been called difficult to cross. The street cuts Vallila in half, and has been said to favour throughfare of cars and to be a challenge for bicycles and pedestrians. The new zoning plan for the area with new traffic solutions and park areas is intended to make the street less of a passageway, and to develop the street area as an area for jobs and as an extension to the city centre.

There are residential and office buildings on both sides of the street, and the neighbourhood of Puu-Vallila ("Wooden Vallila") is located to the north of the street. To the south of the street are the historical Pasila machine works and the Dallapénpuisto park. There is a ramp to the Sturenkatu street. Topographically, the street is almost entirely the bottom of an old valley stretching from Pasila to Sörnäinen, and its landscape structure can be best seen from the overpass bridges on Hämeentie and Sturenkatu.

Heavy traffic uses Teollisuuskatu to move between the western and eastern parts of the city centre. The Teollisuuskatu tunnel built in 2019 at the western end of the street cuts underneath the main railway and connects Teollisuuskatu with Veturitie. Originally Teollisuuskatu used to end at an intersection with Ratapihantie, and car traffic to the west was over the Pasilansilta bridge.

== History ==
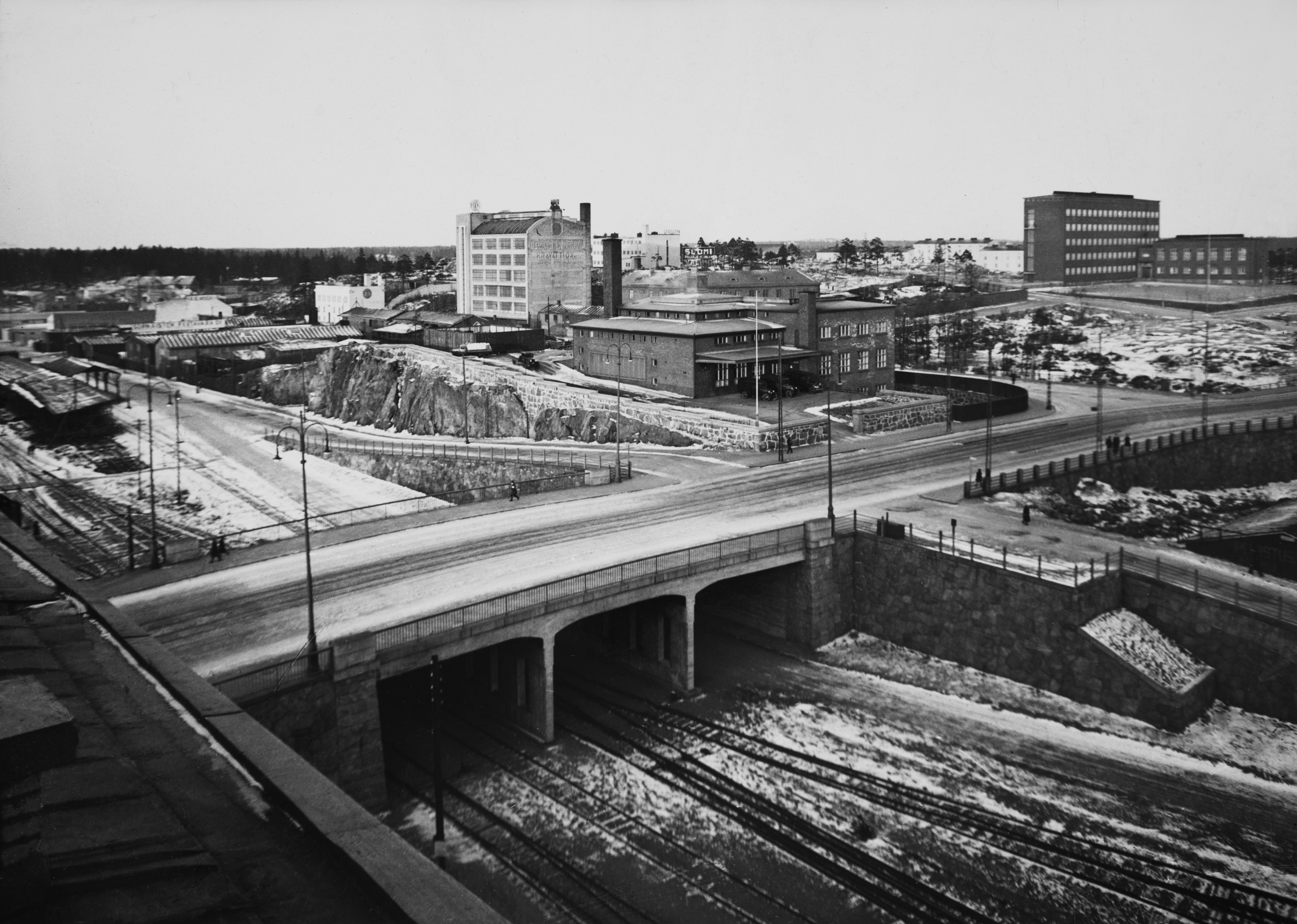
The Sturenkatu bridge in the 1930s. The harbour railway ran along Teollisuuskatu until 1965.

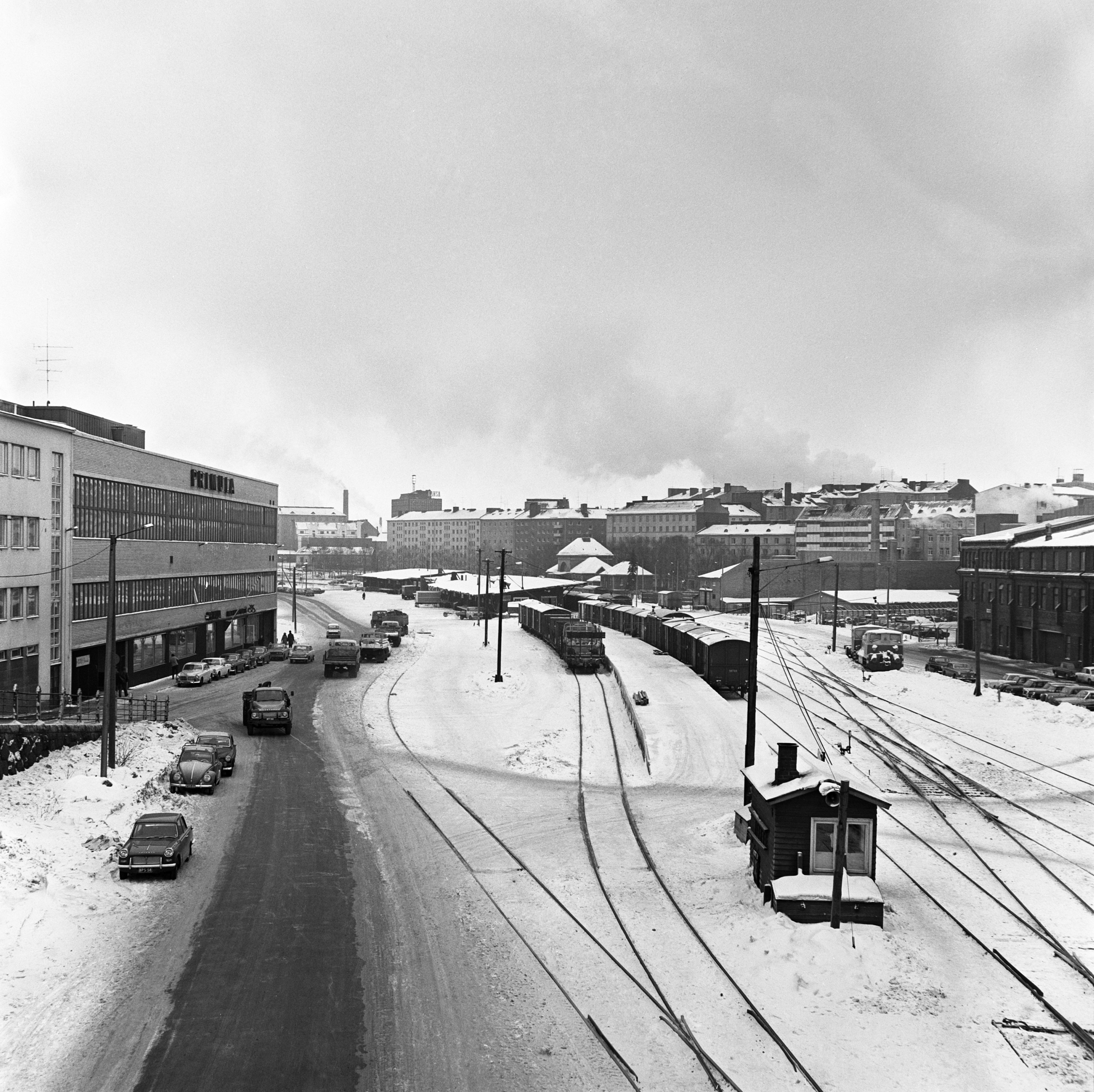
A view from the Sturenkatu bridge to the east in 1968. The tracks lead to the freight station.

The Sörnäinen harbour rail was originally located along the southern edge of what is now Teollisuuskatu. The harbour rail built into the valley was completed in 1863, and Helsinki's new industrial zone grew along it. The tracks led from the Pasila rail yard to the Sörnäinen Harbour, and along the way, the Pasila machine works and the Vallila freight station formed a significant railway area. Teollisuuskatu was later built, narrower at the time, along the track on its northern edge, and it originally only led from Hämeentie to Jämsänkatu. In the early 1960s, the track was moved to a new route through the Pasila railway tunnel to Vallilanlaakso and Hermannin rantatie. The effect of the harbour railway in traffic solutions, the city structure and buildings built story by story over time can still be seen: the nature of the street with its overpass bridges and parallel street lines is separate from the rest of the city structure, even resembling a railway yard, and the street area is not very lush with plant life.

After the track lining changed, only the parts leading to the freight station and to the machine works remained in use on Teollisuuskatu. The part leading to the machine works was a prominent part of the landscape of the western end of the street up to the early 2000s. The harbour rail was dismantled from 2009 to 2010. After the dismantling, the western end of the street was completely renovated. During the construction of the Teollisuuskatu tunnel, the two-lane ramp leading to Ratapihantie, which had been constructed as an extension of the street in the 1980s, was dismantled, and a new Konepajansilta bridge for bicycles and pedestrians was built over the street. There is one lane on both directions at the entrance of the tunnel. The lanes to Ratapihantie are one-directional, and the steep cliff on their edge also has lanes for bicycles and pedestrians.

== Future ==
The connection between Pasila and Kalasatama, called the Teollisuuskatu axis, is marked as a central activity area in the Helsinki zoning plan in 2016. Teollisuuskatu is planned to become a new lively main street, "a fusion of jobs, events and culture". There are no plans for new residential buildings along the street.

According to the zoning known as "the Wall Street of Helsinki", there could be new buildings, bicycle paths and a new light rail track built on grass, which would replace the current bus line 500. Car traffic could be removed altogether from the northernmost lanes of the street. The Teollisuuskatu light rail would demand great changes on both Teollisuuskatu and the intersection between Junatie and Sörnäisten rantatie, but if it is built, it would connect Pasila as an urban rail connection to Herttoniemi.

== Buildings along the street ==
- Pasila machine works, 1903
- Harju youth house, a former morgue, 1923
- OP Financial Group headquarters, 2015

=== Dismantled buildings ===
- Vallila freight station, dismantled in 1987
