= Keski-Pasila =

Keski-Pasila Mellersta Böle
- Helsinki Subdivision
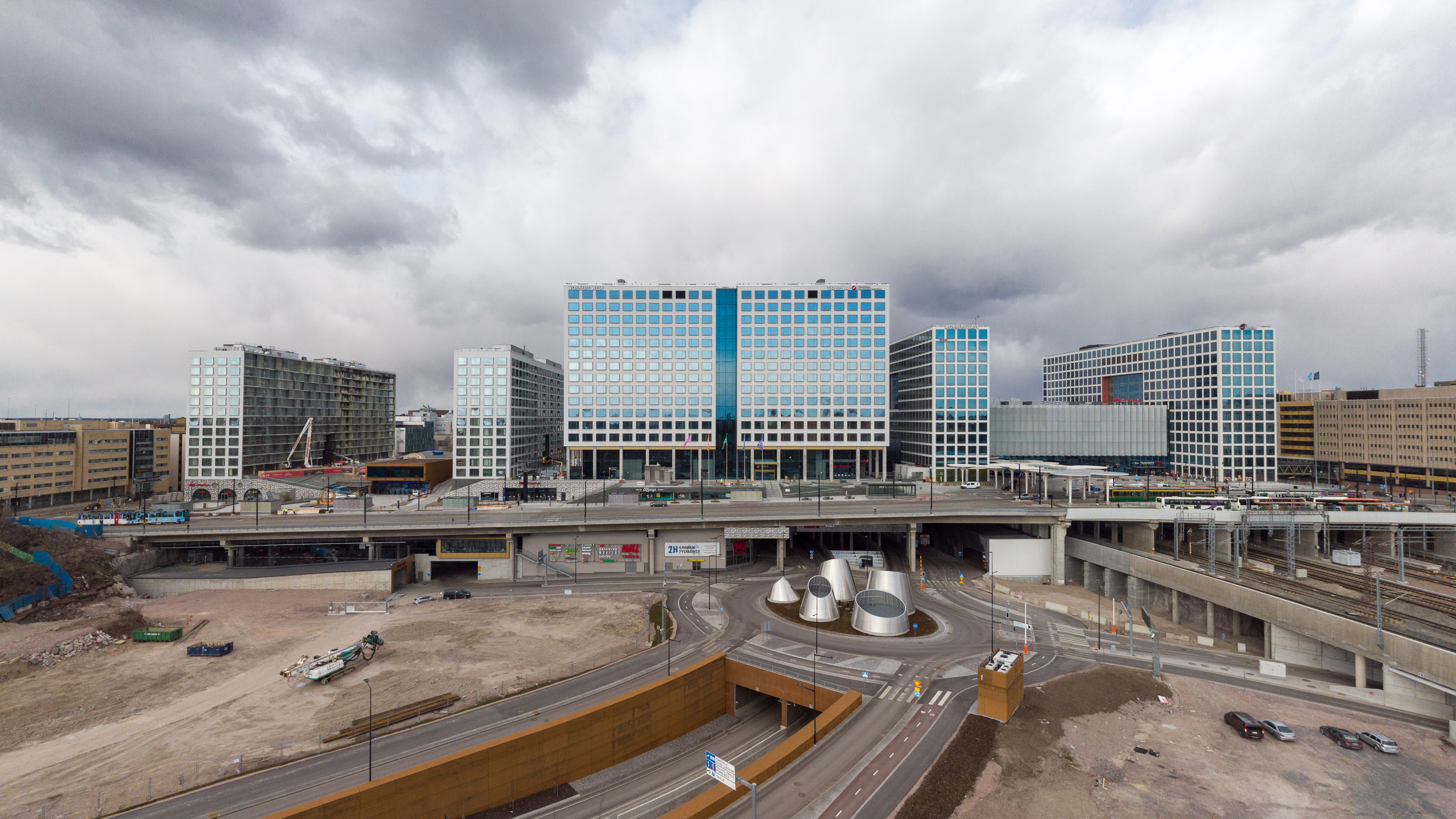

- Position of Keski-Pasila within Helsinki
- Coordinates: 60.197994°N 24.932019°E
- Country: Finland
- Region: Uusimaa
- Sub-region: Greater Helsinki
- Municipality: Helsinki
- District: Central
- Area: 0.20 km^{2} (0.077 sq mi)
- Population: 135
  - Density: 675/km^{2} (1,750/sq mi)
- Postal codes: 00230, 00240, 00520
- Subdivision number: 174

Keski-Pasila (Finnish), Mellersta Böle (Swedish) is a neighborhood in the Pasila subdivision of Helsinki, Finland.
