= Mall of Tripla =

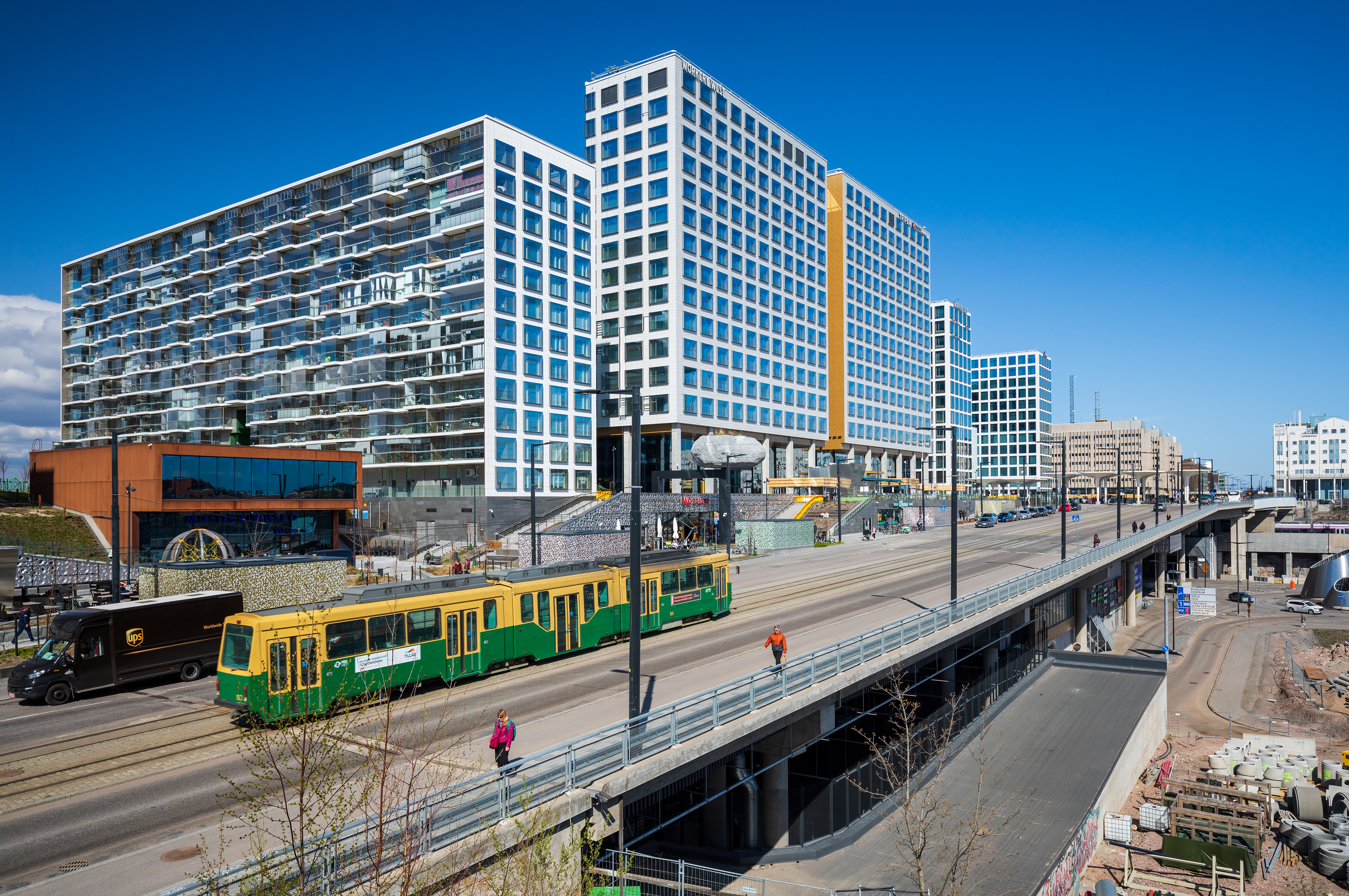
- Tripla seen from the southwest in May 2022
- Location: Keski-Pasila, Helsinki, Finland
- Coordinates: 60°11′53″N 24°55′48″E
- Opened: October 17, 2019
- Developer: YIT
- Num. of stores: 250
- Floor area: 85,394 square metres (919,170 sq ft)
- Floors: 5
- Parking: 2,300; 300 charging points for electric cars
- Website: malloftripla.fi/en/

The Mall of Tripla is a shopping mall in Keski-Pasila, Helsinki, Finland. The mall, along with a rebuilt railway station, opened on 17 October 2019. With a total leasable retail area of 85,394 square metres (919,170 sq ft), the mall is the fourth-largest shopping mall in Finland and in terms of total leasable units, one of the largest shopping malls in Northern Europe.

In 2022 just after three years from completion The Mall of Tripla will undergo large scale renovation on the facades due construction errors and poor materials.

== The Tripla complex ==
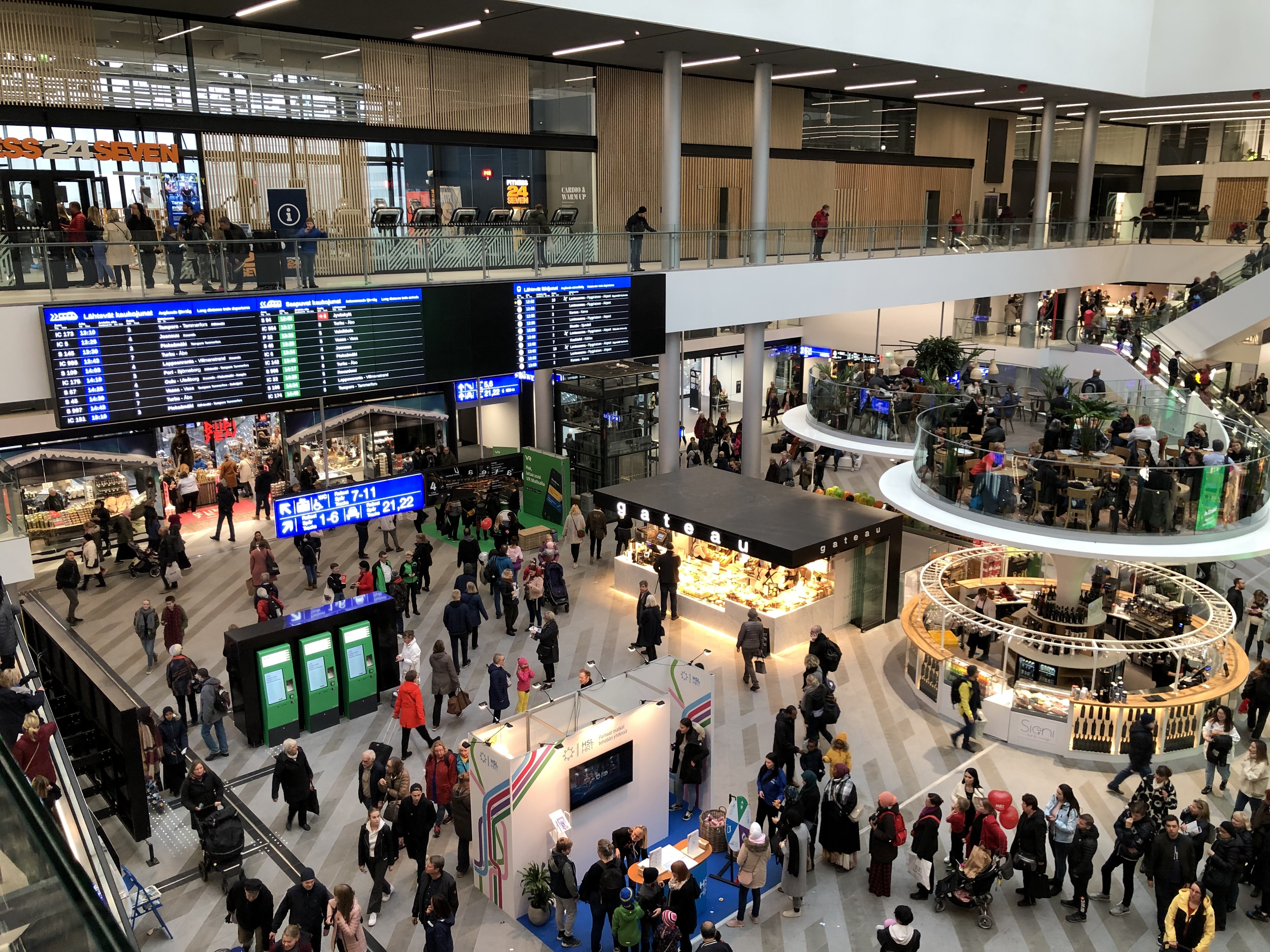
The Pasila railway station in Tripla

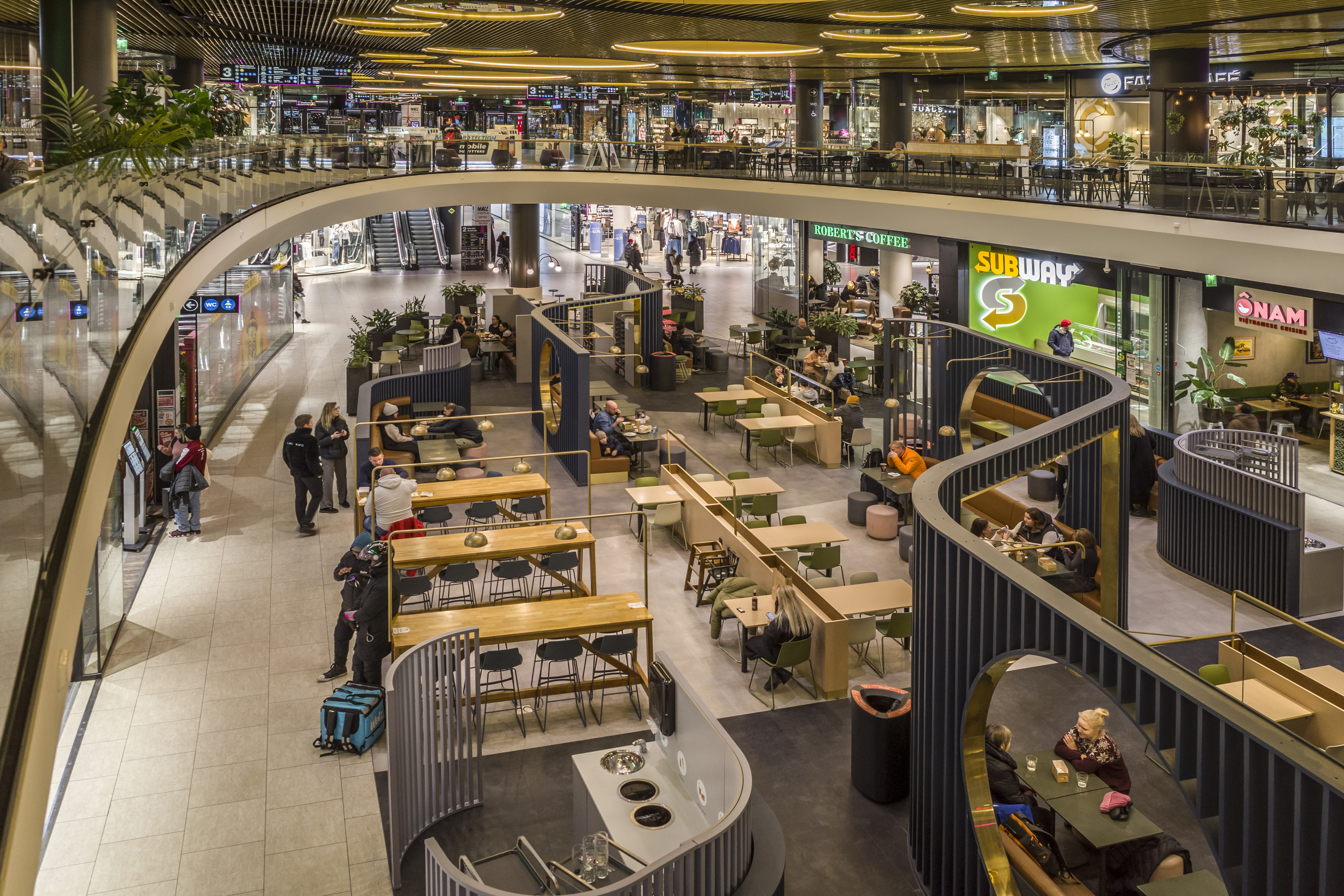
Food court in the Mall of Tripla

Mall of Tripla is part of the larger Tripla complex, which also encompasses the new Pasila railway station, 50,000 square metres (540,000 sq ft) of office space, a Sokos hotel with more than 400 rooms opened in January 2020, a car park, and residential buildings for 1,000 residents. In its entirety, the complex has a gross leasable area of 189,394 square metres (2,038,620 sq ft) (including the shopping mall, offices, and residences). The cost of the Tripla complex was approximately 1.1 billion euros. The European Union provided €130 million of funding for Tripla due to the emphasis on environmental impact in planning the complex.

Companies transferring their headquarters to the Tripla complex include Telia Finland, St1, and HOK-Elanto (part of the S Group).

== See also ==
- Pasila railway station
