= Asemapäällikönhovi =

Mixed-use complex in Helsinki, Finland

Coordinates: 60.1994526°N 24.941881°E

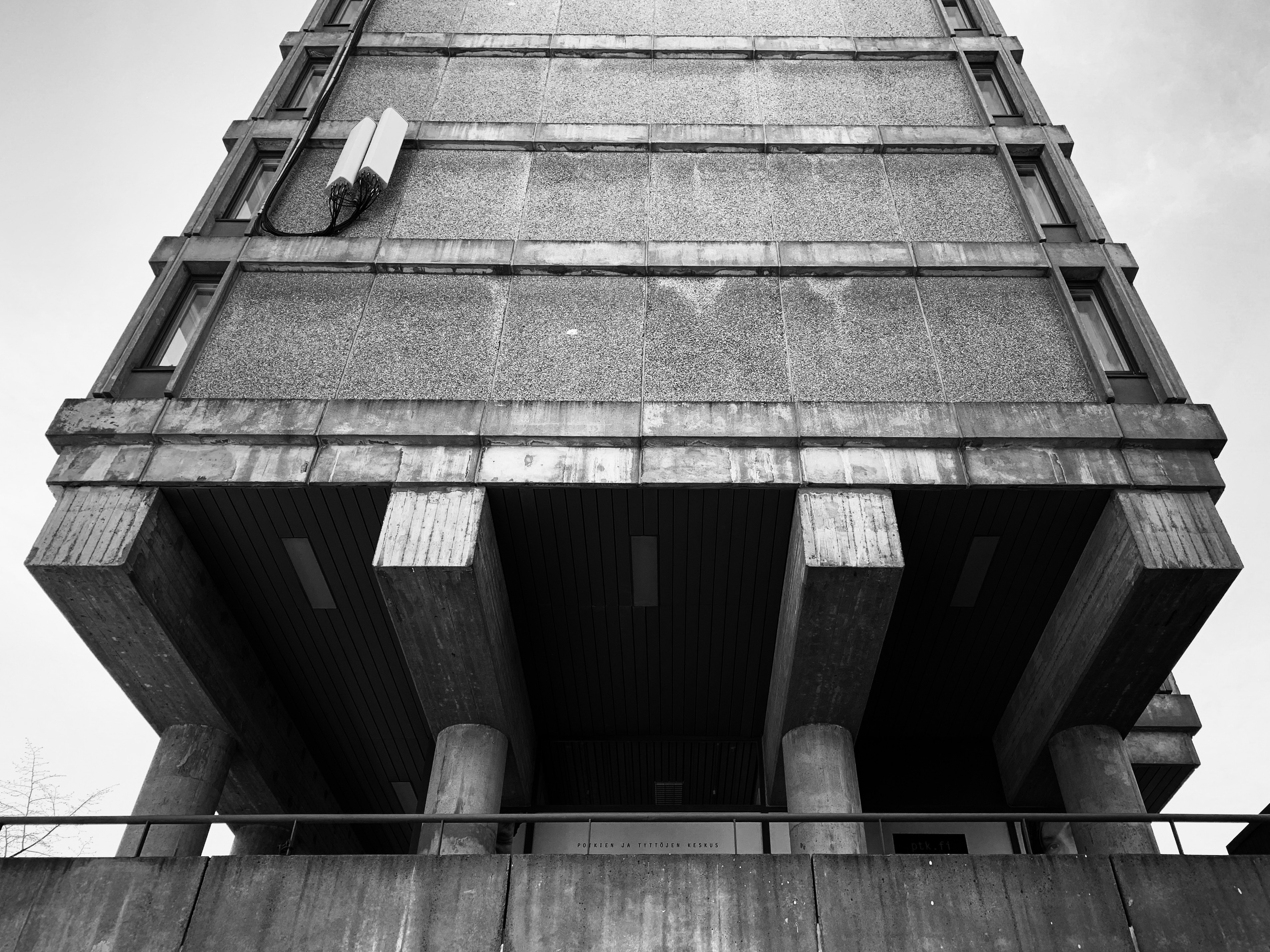
Partial northern elevation of Asemapäällikönhovi

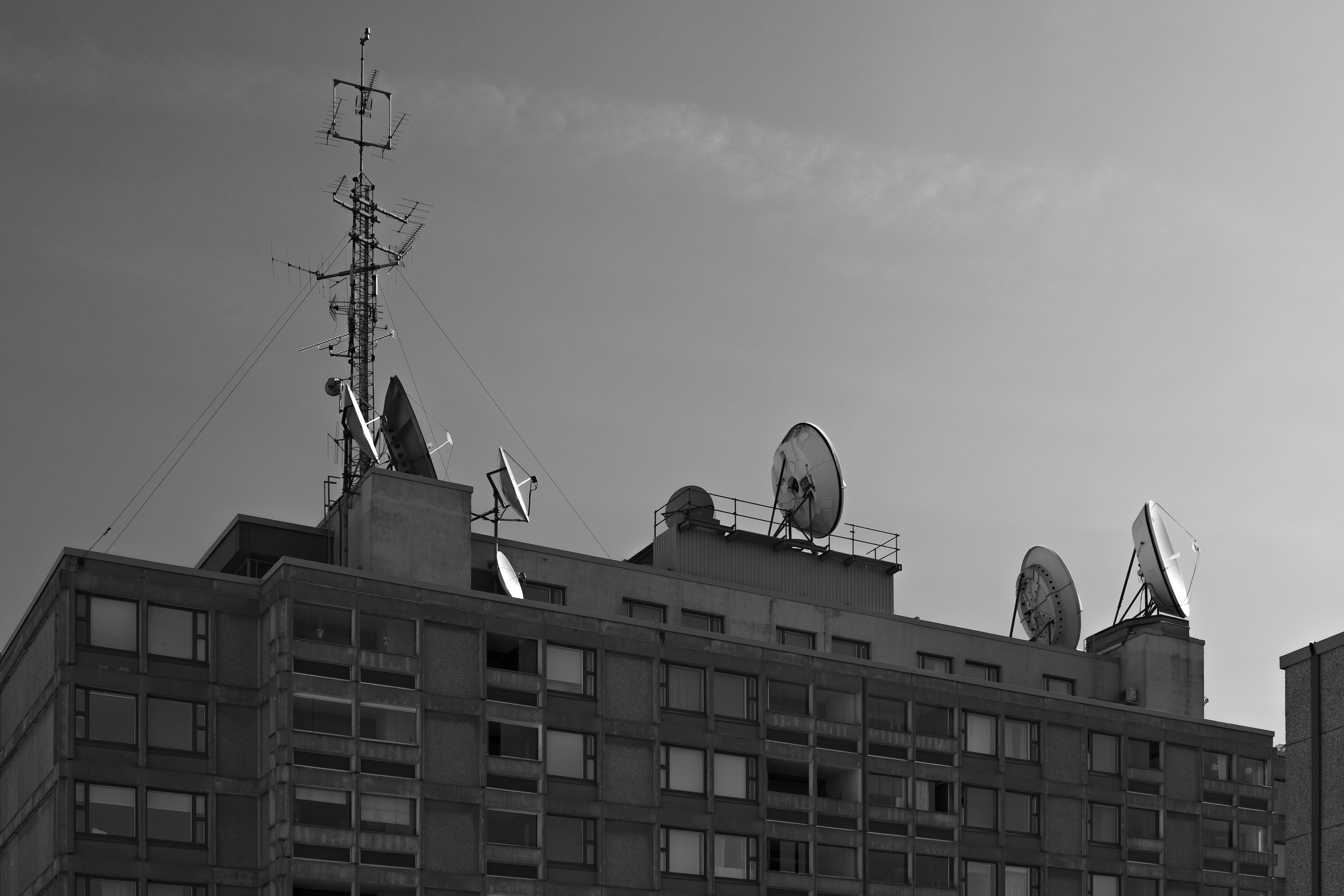
Top floors with rooftop aerials clearly visible

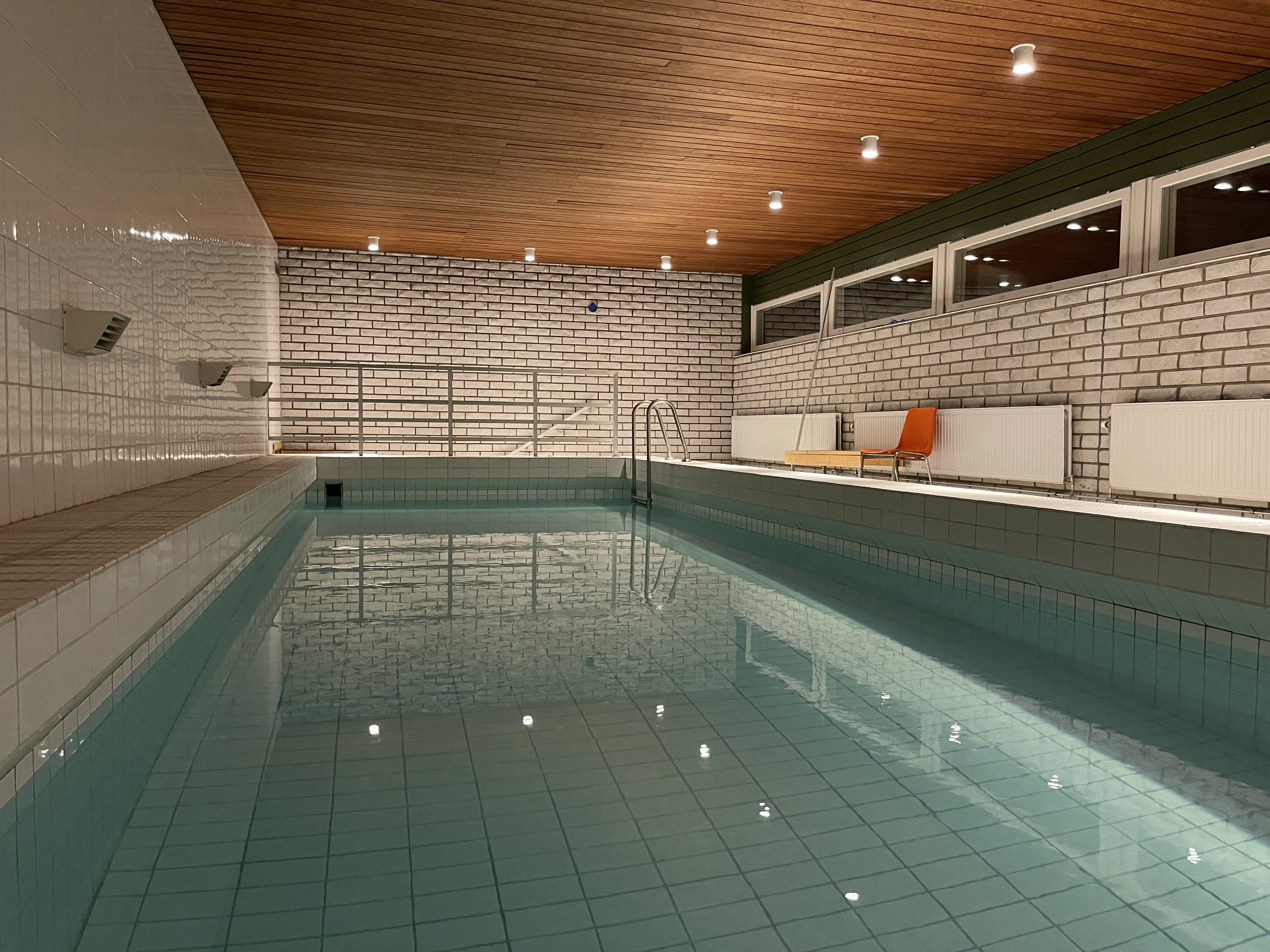
The 10 metre swimming pool on the top floor is available to residents of the building.

The Asemapäällikönhovi (literally, Station Master's Court) building is a mixed-use complex located at Asemapäällikönkatu 3, in the Eastern Pasila (Itä-Pasila) area of the district of Pasila in Helsinki, Finland.

The building was designed by architect Eino Tuompo in the Brutalist style, and completed in 1976. It has received acclaim for its bold architecture. In 2020 it was featured by the German Architecture Museum in the exhibition SOS Brutalism. It is also listed by the city of Helsinki on the official Helsinki tourism website myhelsinki.fi as an architectural attraction of historical significance. The building is also referenced on the tourism page for the district of Eastern Pasila. Emporis includes the building in its global database of "buildings of high public and economic value."

Of the total floor area of 15,921 square metres (171,370 sq ft), about 75% is dedicated to commercial uses and 25% to residential flats, of which there are 60.

The building is owned by Osakeyhtiö Asemapäällikönhovi – a standard joint-stock company, rather than a housing joint-stock company (asunto-osakeyhtiö).

The top floor of the residential tower is dedicated to the following common facilities for residents:

- A 10 x 3 metre swimming pool, heated using district heating. The pool is open every morning to all residents for communal use as well as in the evenings for private use during each resident's own sauna time slot.
- Two saunas, each with dedicated showering and changing facilities and access to the pool. Each resident can book a weekly private sauna hour which includes private use of the pool.
- A gym with dedicated showering and changing facilities.
- A drying room (for drying large fabrics like sheets).
- Two roof decks.

The basement floors of the building include both heated and refrigerated storage units, one of both corresponding to each flat.

== Television studio ==
The building complex contains the former Helsinki Televisio TV-studios, later operated by Tuotantotalo Werne and currently operated by Streamteam Nordic. Today the studios are owned by telecom operator DNA who also owns other space in the building.

The studios were inaugurated in December 1976 by the Mayor of Helsinki, Teuvo Aura. In 1978 the facility began to produce the first subscription-based TV channel in Europe, called Viihde-kanava.

In 1982 the studio became the first in Europe to relay satellite broadcasts to a cable network.

Large, C-band satellite dishes were installed on the roof of the residential tower to facilitate these operations and they remained a local landmark until being removed in the autumn of 2026. The dishes were removed as a part of work being done on the roof to install a building-wide exhaust air heat-recovery system. The new heat exchangers on the roof required a significant amount of space, thus the dishes had to be removed to accommodate the equipment. DNA has since installed smaller, modern Ku-band dishes in their place.

== In popular culture ==
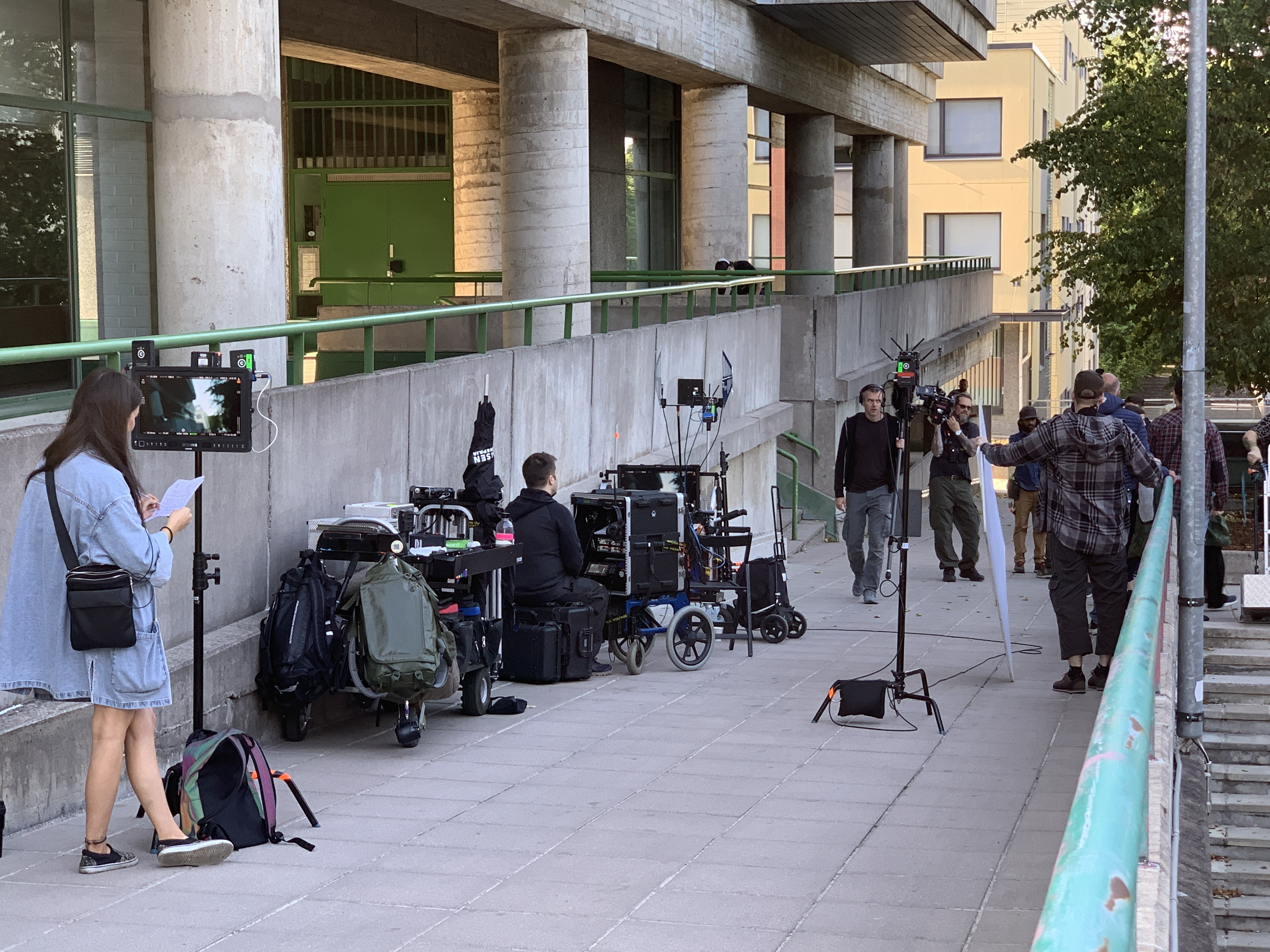
Swedish TV show Advokaten (season 2, episode 7) being filmed at the building in 2019.

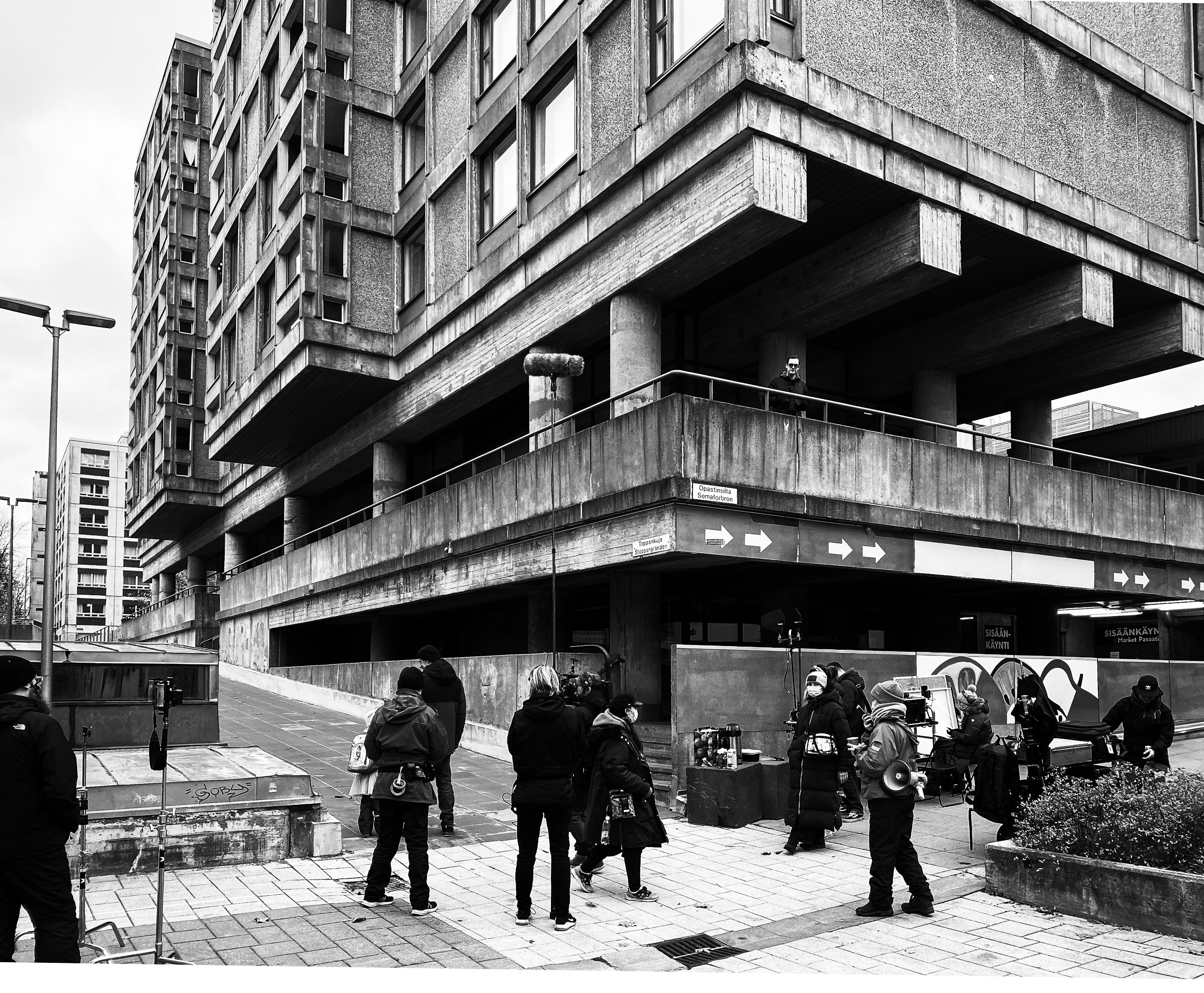
Filming of YLE short film "Ero."

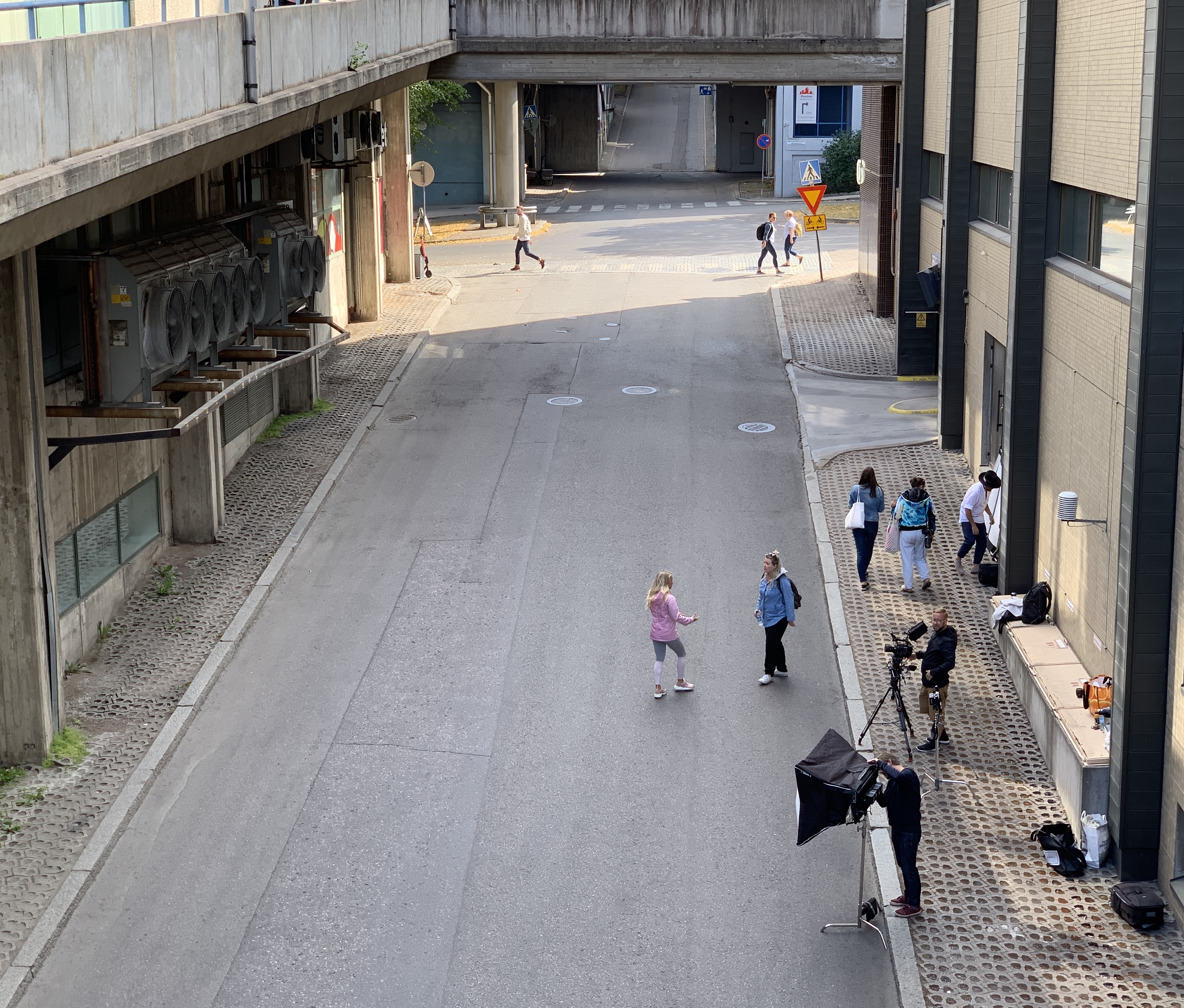
Dplay.fi advertisement being filmed by the loading dock entrance of the building.

The distinct architecture of the complex has attracted international attention from photographers and filmmakers. At least the following works have been partially or wholly made on the property:

2025

- Itä-Pasila by Anu Pennanen – a documentary about the neighbourhood of East Pasila, featuring the building – Produced by Palo Productions with support from Arts Promotion Centre Finland, AVEK, City of Helsinki, the Finnish Cultural Foundation, the Niilo Helander Foundation, the Olga and Vilho Linnamo Foundation and the Oskar Öflund Foundation – Official Selection, Helsinki Documentary Film Festival 2025
- Music video: Spaceboy Pinkhead by Grande Mahogany – partially filmed around the building.

2024

- Music video: Juostaan ft. Sexmane by Sara Siipola
- Video: Mitä Kuuluu Pasila by SRV – partially filmed at Outrun Cafe.

2023

- YLE TV show Akuutti, episode Aivovamma - näkymätön epidemia – filmed at Outrun Cafe.

2022

- Makia clothing marketing campaign Winter 2022, featured on the Makia homepage and Instagram – filmed and photographed around the building.

2021

- Music video: ISO VOIMAKAS KOMEE by WYK, Eevil Stöö, Pajafella, Justsesomali – filmed partly on the roof of the residential tower.
- Music video: Heartless by Mauton – Filmed around the courtyard and the entrances to the residential tower.
- Advertising campaign: Lähde Lenkille by SEK for HK – filmed around the building.
- Music video: Mihi sä meet? by Hazard – filmed all over the building, including on the roof with the iconic satellite dishes.

2020

- Music video: Veli mä vannon by Gettomasa – filmed around the property.
- YLE short film Ero – filmed around the property, including in the courtyard, facing the office wing.
- Music video: Katon mitä tapahtuu by Armas – shots of the residential tower and the facade including the refrigeration heat exchangers used by the K-Market in the building.
- Music video: v!@%#mikko by Pyhimys – shots of the residential tower and the pilotis at its base.

2019

- Episode 7, season 2 of Advokaten (TV series) – filmed around the property, including in a stairwell and lobby of the residential tower and in a flat there.
- Dplay.fi marketing campaign, published online and via digital, bus stop roll-signs around the city – featuring the heat exchanger facade as well as a facade facing Topparikuja.

2012

- Music video: HELSINKI - SHANGRI-LA by Paleface – filmed primarily in the space under Opastinsilta by the building's garage entrance. Also including shots of the loading dock entrance and K-Market heat exchangers.

== Current tenants ==
The commercial tenants based in the building include:

- DNA Oyj (telecom operator)
- Outrun Cafe
- Restaurant and Cafe Pastelaria Brasil
- K-Market Pasaati (grocery store)
- Suora Oy (TV studio operator)
- Pasilan Pizzapalvelu (restaurant)
- Helsingin Varavarasto (self-storage facility)
