= Pasila =

City area in Helsinki, Finland

Coordinates: 60°12′00″N 24°55′57″E

Pasila Böle
- Helsinki Subdivision
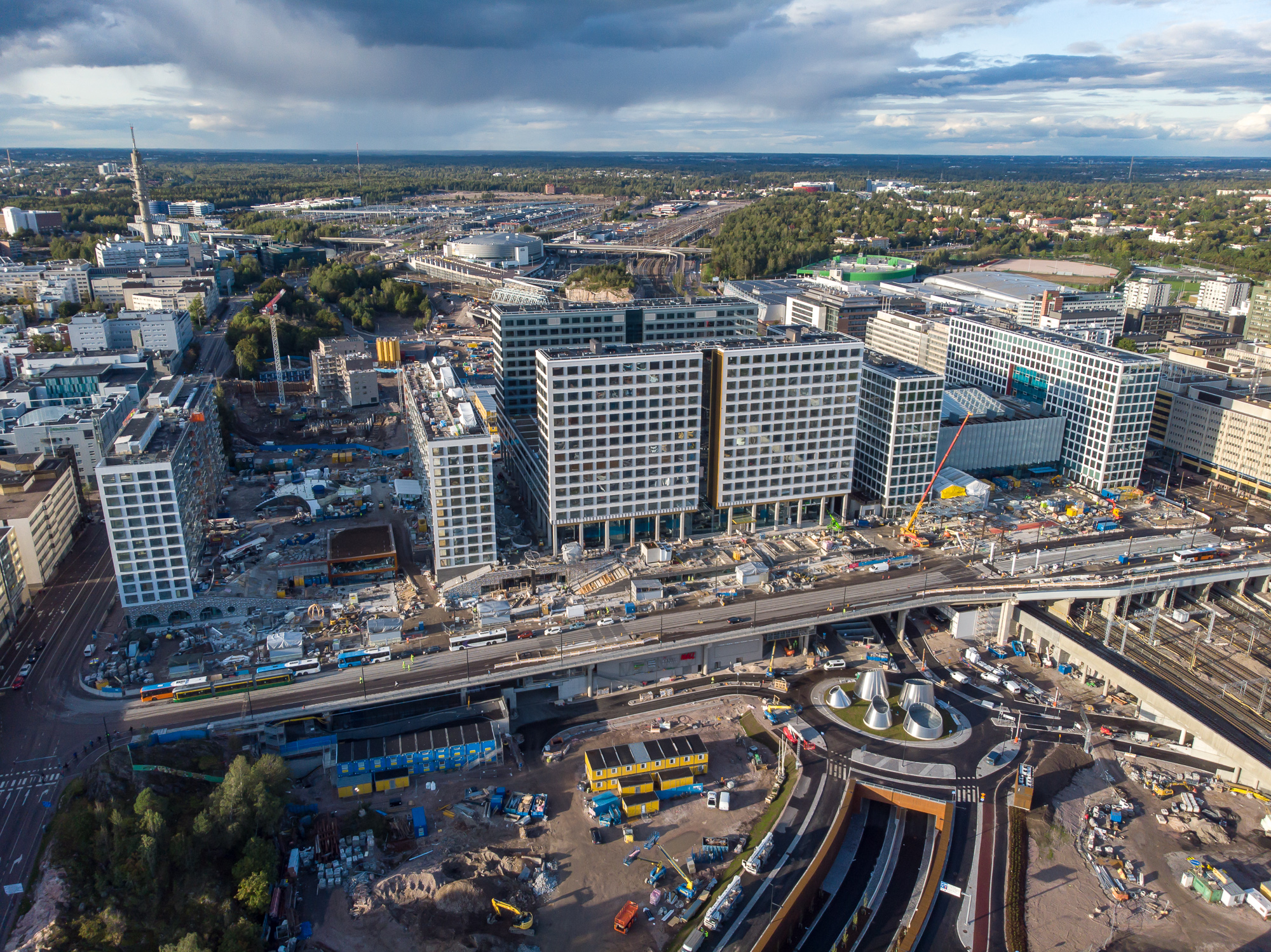
- Pasila from the air in 2019. Pasila railway station is surrounded by office buildings and the Mall of Tripla, built in 2019.

- Position of Pasila within Helsinki
- Country: Finland
- Region: Uusimaa
- Sub-region: Greater Helsinki
- Municipality: Helsinki
- District: Southern
- Subdivision regions: Keski-Pasila, Länsi-Pasila, Itä-Pasila, Pohjois-Pasila
- Neighbouring subdivisions: Alppiharju; Kumpula; Käpylä; Laakso; Ruskeasuo; Vallila

Pasila (Finnish: [ˈpɑsilɑ]; Swedish: Böle, Finland Swedish: [ˈbøːˌle]) is a part of Helsinki, Finland, that is both a central-northern neighbourhood and district, bordering the areas of Alppila to the south, the Central Park (Keskuspuisto) to the west, and Vallila to the east.

Pasila is a major transportation hub. At its heart is the Pasila railway station, the second busiest station in Finland. The station serves about 130,000 people per day via 900 trains, 400 trams and 850 buses.

== Central Pasila ==
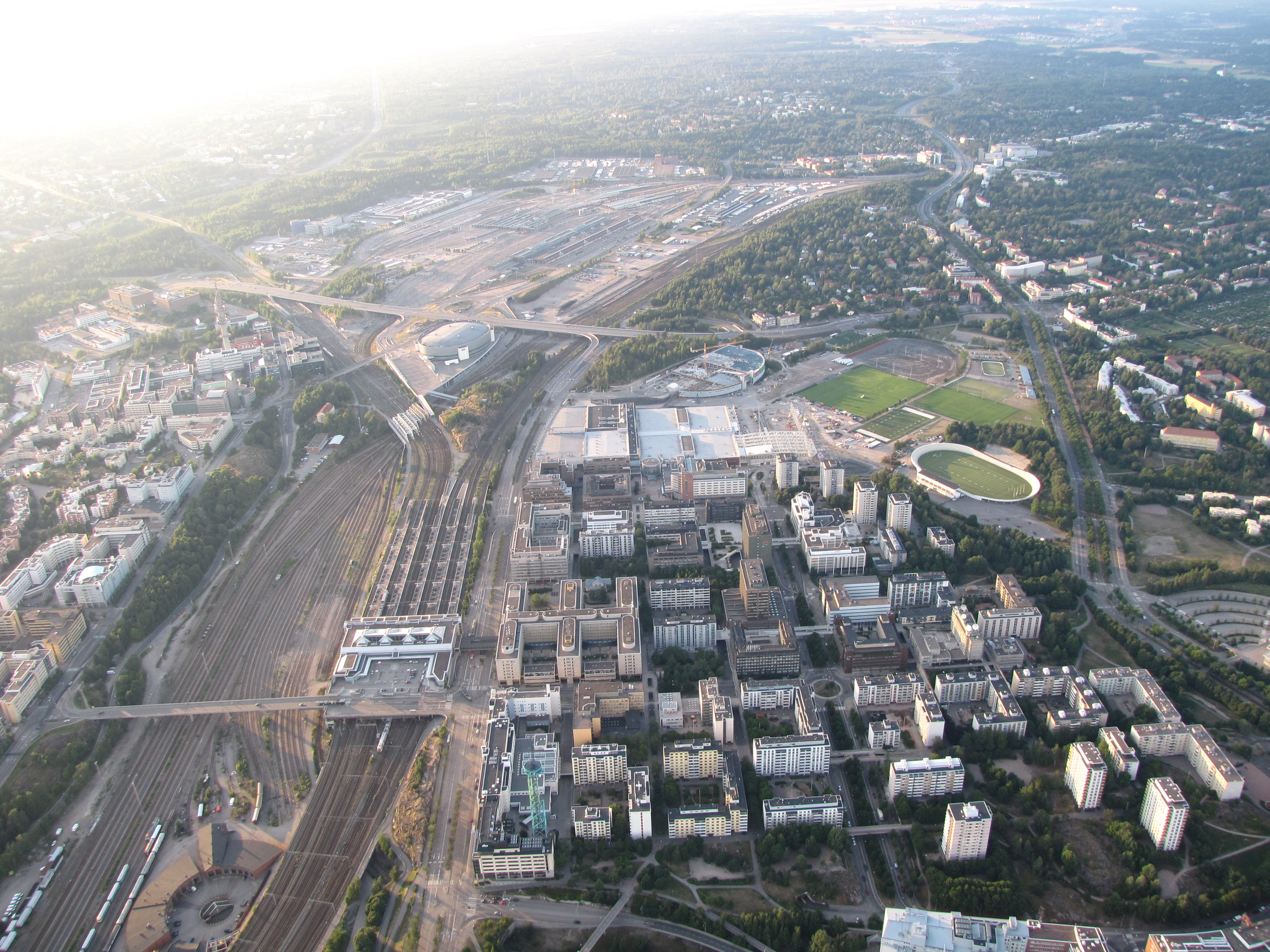
The former classification yard dividing the whole district is clearly visible in a 2010 aerial photograph. The 1990s station building by the bridge was later demolished and replaced by today's Tripla complex.

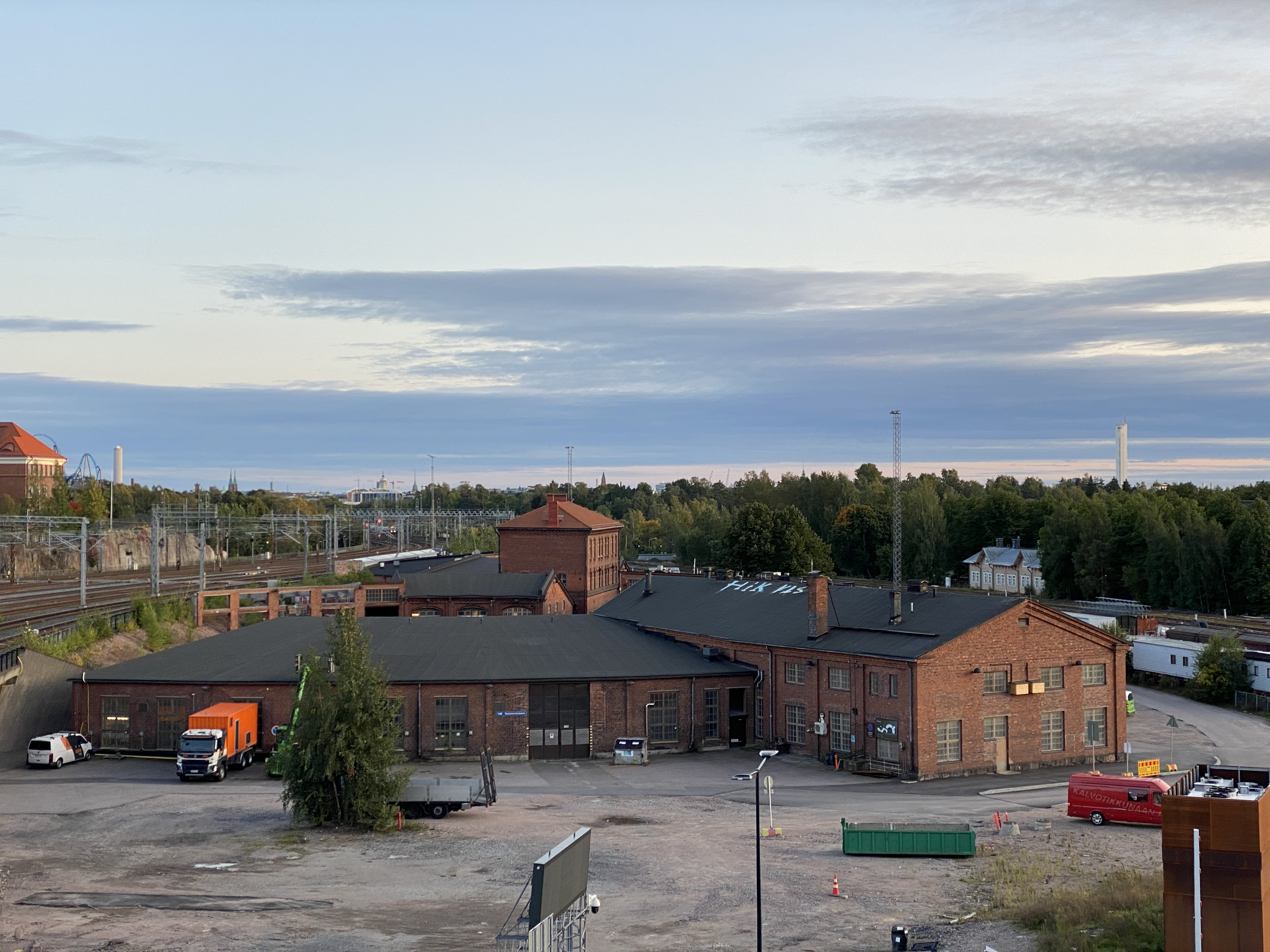
Pasila locomotive garages, protected by the Heritage Agency, have been repurposed into storages, restaurants and recreational use.

The eastern and western parts of Pasila were formerly separated by a large railroad classification yard before the development of Central Pasila (Finnish: Keski-Pasila), beginning in 2014. Central Pasila is currently home to the major sports and music venue Helsinki Halli and the Tripla complex, which includes a hotel of about 430 rooms, 50,000 square metres of office space (including the headquarters of telecom operator Telia Finland), about 400 residential flats and the largest commercial center in the Nordic countries with 250 shops.

There are several projects under construction or planning near the railway station. In connection with Tripla, a project of multiple skyscrapers called Trigoni were planned, the tallest of which, about 180 meters high from the top of the building, would have been visible, in good weather, all the way to the Estonian coast. However, YIT pulled out of the project in 2021. A second, more modest proposal by Skanska was instead adopted. Construction of its centerpiece, the 130-meter The Node, commenced in 2024 and is expected to be completed by 2028.

== West ==
Western Pasila (Finnish: Länsi-Pasila) was built during the 1980s. It is a mainly residential area with approximately 4,500 inhabitants. Apartment buildings in Western Pasila have a red brick facade. The Finnish national broadcasting company Yle as well as the commercial MTV3 have their main premises in the northern end of the area. Helsinki's main police station is also located in Western Pasila.

Before the 1970s, Pasila was home to dilapidated wooden houses and was known for cheap rent and crime. It was then known simply as Wooden Pasila (Finnish: Puu-Pasila). Today only a few of the old wooden structures exist.

== East ==
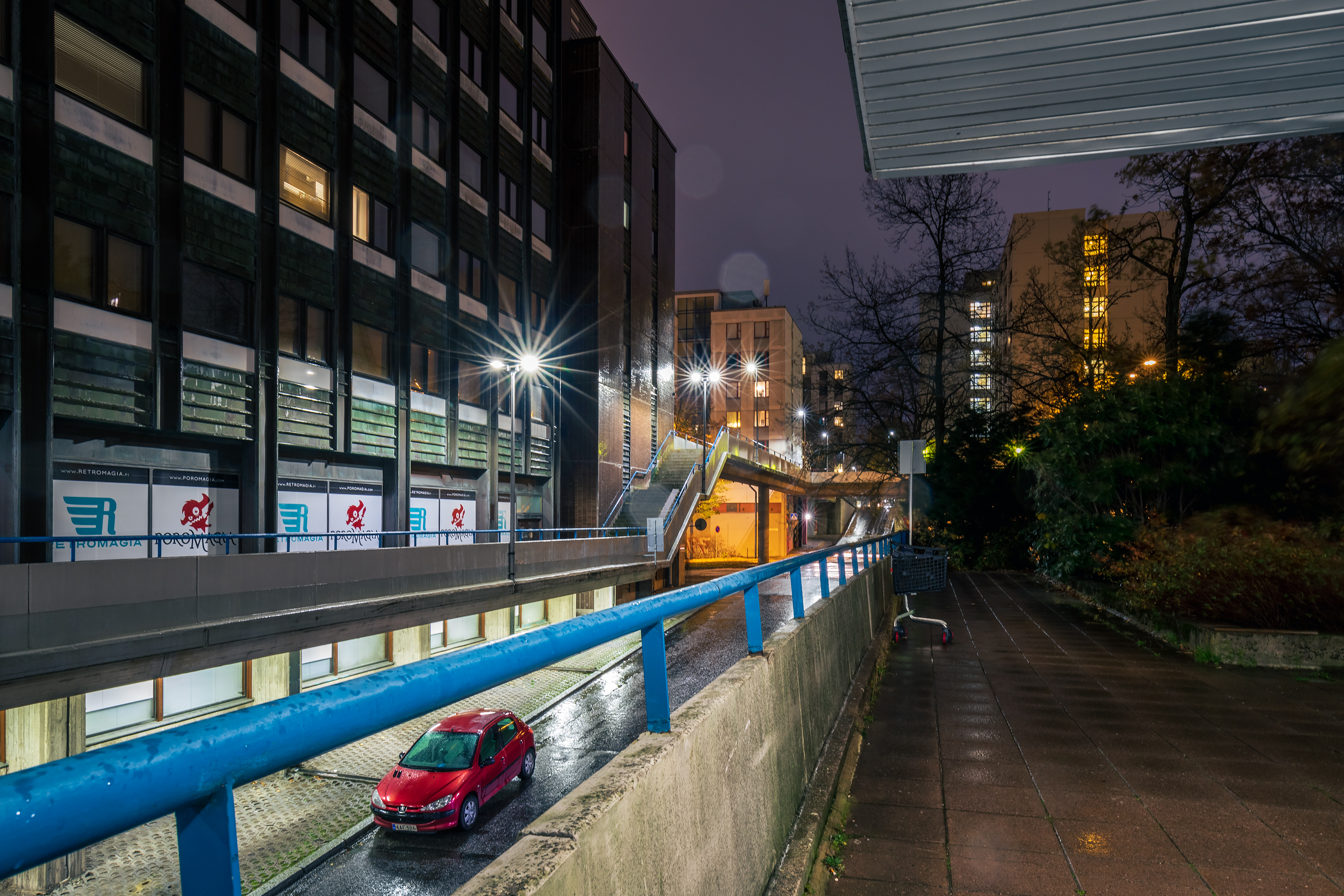
Eastern Pasila, known for its brutalist architecture, was built in the 1970s and 1980s.

Eastern Pasila (Finnish: Itä-Pasila) is a highly mixed-use area of offices, flats and commercial spaces, built in the 1970s and 1980s. In terms of urban planning the most distinct feature of the area is its pedestrian-friendly design, based around a raised, pedestrian-only podium that connects to all buildings. Master planning of the area was led by Reijo Jallinoja and was based on his 1967 thesis work. The area is home to about 5,000 residents and 11,000 workplaces. Notable institutions include Helsinki Business College, Haaga–Helia University of Applied Sciences, the Helsinki City Theatre company, the main library of the city and Finland's largest convention center, Messukeskus. The area is a telecom and media center of national significance with the headquarters of telecom operator Elisa and a major presence of telecom operator DNA, who also own the TV studios at the Asemapäällikönhovi building, operated by Streamteam Nordic. The area is home to Helsinki's most vibrant street-art scene as well as the Helsinki Urban Art center, the international hub for street art in Finland.

== North ==
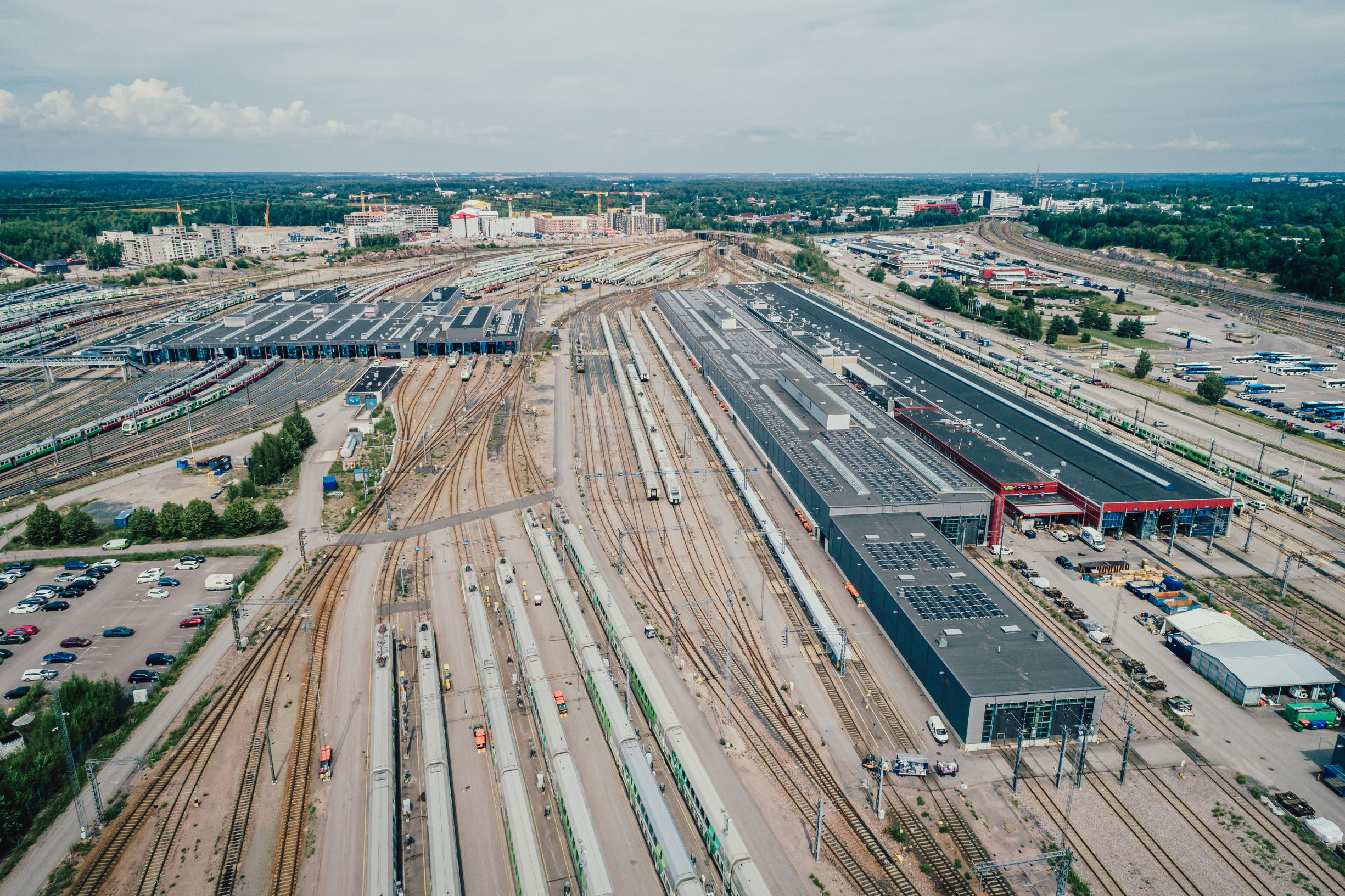
Ilmala depot is serving both long distance and commuter trains.

Northern Pasila (Finnish: Pohjois-Pasila) is mainly known for Ilmala depot and a 2010s residential area called Postipuisto.
