= World Peace (sculpture) =

Sculpture in Helsinki, Finland

- Maailman rauha (Finnish)
- Artist: Oleg Kiryuhin
- Year: 1990
- Subject: World peace
- Dimensions: 650 cm (260 in)
- Condition: Bronze
- Location: Helsinki; 60°10′41.28″N 024°57′12.55″E

World peace (Finnish: Maailman rauha, rauha maailmalle; Swedish: Världsfreden: Russian: Мир во всем мире) is a bronze sculpture donated by the city of Moscow, Russia to the city of Helsinki, Finland, created by sculptor Oleg Kiryuhin. The sculpture was located at Hakaniemenranta in Helsinki, and it was revealed on 14 January 1990, two months after the Berlin Wall had been broken. The sculpture belongs to the collection of the Helsinki Art Museum.

The sculpture is 6.5 metres tall. It represents people representing different continents of the world holding the world decorated with tree leaves with one of their arms. The people in the statue have made fists with their hands not holding the world to represent a demonstration for the cause of world peace.

The sculpture has caused much controversy in Finland. In 2008 it was chosen as both the third ugliest and the third most loved sculpture in Helsinki in a readers' poll held in newspapers.

== Background ==
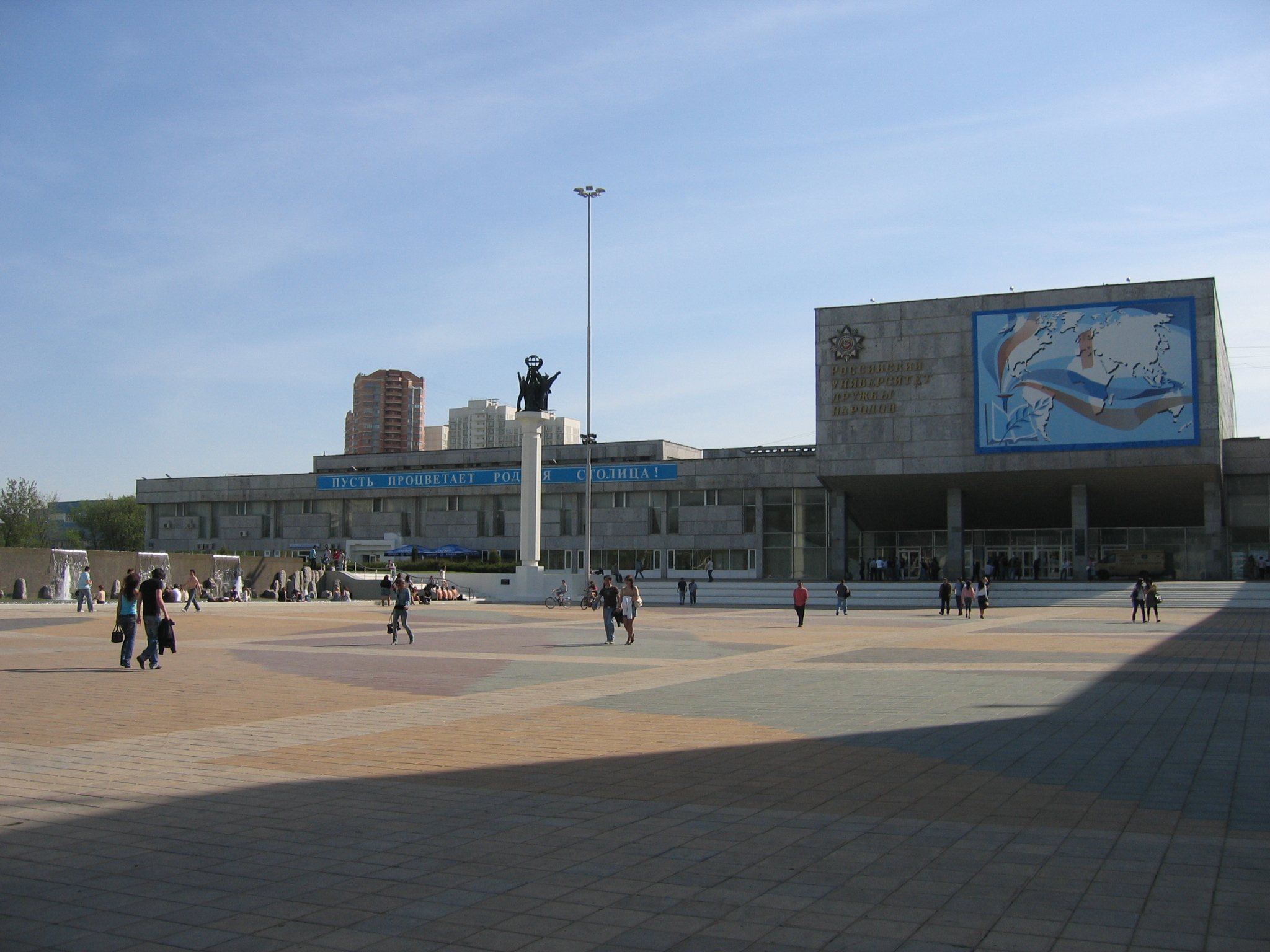
A copy of the sculpture on top of a pillar in front of the Peoples' Friendship University of Russia in Moscow.

According to the 1983 sculpture exchange treaty between Moscow and Helsinki, Helsinki donated the 1990 sculpture Children of peace by Antti Neuvonen to Moscow.

In 1983 a long cultural-political discussion was held about Oleg Kiryuhin's sculpture, where it was met with strong opposition. However, the city of Helsinki declined the alternative option to receive a statue of Lenin.

The sculpture World peace is one of many copies of the original sculpture. Copies of the original were placed in numerous cities in the Soviet Union and the copy in Helsinki was probably the last copy to be placed. Helsinki is the only location outside the former Soviet Union to host a copy of the sculpture.

The sculpture was part of the overall plan of the Hakaniemi market square in the late 1980s. According to a Helsingin Sanomat article in 1986 the market square plan would have also included two sculpture contest winners: Riemukaari ("the arch of triumph") cast in red brick by Jukka Vikberg and Hermeksen pöytä ("the table of Hermes") cast in red granite by Reijo Paavilainen. They would have been located near the Hakaniemi market hall.

The sculpture was delivered to Helsinki in 1989 in parts. Sculptor Kiryuhin oversaw welding the sculpture together.

== Reception ==
=== Revelation ===
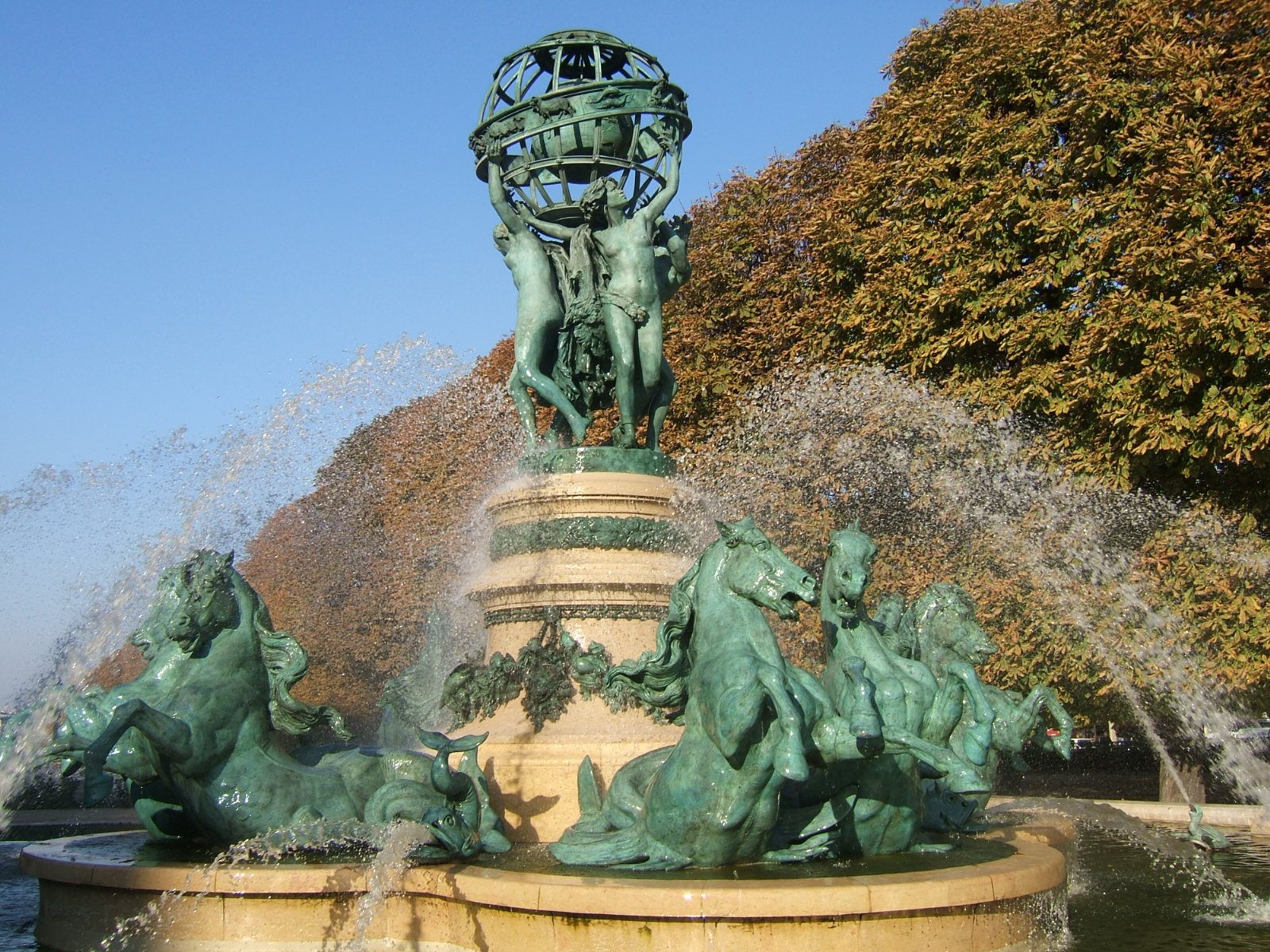
Jean-Baptiste Carpeaux: Quatre parties du monde at the Jardin du Luxembourg in Paris.

According to reporter Timo Kalevi Forss the old rhetoric of the Finno-Soviet Treaty of 1948 was still alive and well at the sculpture's revelation in 1990 and it was seen to contain "unease from great power politics and stiffness of fur cap embassies". The mayor of Helsinki at the time, Raimo Ilaskivi (National Coalition Party) described the sculpture as a "passionate, clear and concrete appeal for peace and friendship". The Soviet Union was represented by a delegation led by Valeri T. Saikin, the head of the executive committee of the Moscow city council, which also included the sculptor Kiryuhin.

According to Forss glasnost and perestroika had already influenced the thoughts of the Soviet citizens. At the revelation event, the artist said the sculpture was realist but not socialist. He also did not want to describe the female figure in the sculpture as either capitalist or socialist.

=== Interpretations ===
According to Lasse Lehtinen, a common nickname for the sculpture is "the fish-trap thieves".

The human figures in the sculpture, with their hands clenched into fists, are said to depict the different continents of the world, but there is no figure depicting Asia. Cultural journalist Hannu Marttila has interpreted the sculpture as drawing influence from the sculpture Quatre parties du monde ("four continents") by Jean-Baptiste Carpeaux at the middle of the fountain at the Jardin du Luxembourg in Paris, France.

Maija Koskinen, who has studied the art of the Cold War era has said that 1990 was probably the last possible year for a sculpture exchange between Finland and the Soviet Union. According to her, the sculpture is quite a relic and can be interpreted as a memorial to Finlandisation. At the time of the sculpture's revelation, Finland was already seeking a new relationship to its eastern neighbour.

== Controversies ==
=== Tarring (1991) ===
The sculpture was tarred on Thursday 10 October 1991 on Aleksis Kivi Day starting at 4 PM. The perpetrators were political science student Jari Kajas, law student Mikael Jungner and medicine student Sara Hirvelä. After the tarring, the perpetrators covered the sculpture in feathers. The police arrived at 4:25 PM and the situation lasted until 4:40 PM, when all three were driven away in a police car.

According to the group who had named themselves as the "Feather Group", the sculpture is ugly and does not fit into its surroundings. The intent of the group was to send greetings to the City Council of Helsinki. According to the group, Helsinki made a mistake by accepting the sculpture at a time when communism was nearing its end in Eastern Europe.

=== Explosion attempt (2010) ===
There was an attempt to explode the sculpture with a gas bottle at midnight between 9 and 10 May 2010. The police investigated the matter as serious attempted vandalism. In May 2016, a prisoner serving a sentence from a different crime confessed to the explosion attempt, and charges were brought against him. In May 2017 the court of appeal of Eastern Finland sentenced the perpetrator to two years in prison without parole. The court of appeal shortened the sentence originally given by the district court by eight months, as it saw the perpetrator had helped in investigating the crime.

=== Demonstration with the flag of Ukraine (2014) ===
During the night before the national day of Ukraine on 24 August 2014, flags of Ukraine were hung on the sculpture. According to eyewitnesses, in the morning, only torn strips remained of the flags.

=== Move to storage (2022) ===
After the 2022 Russian invasion of Ukraine in February 2022, the word "maailmanräyhää" (Finnish for "world rage", a parody of the sculpture's Finnish name) was written on the base of the sculpture and the base was wrapped in blue-and-yellow ribbon representing the flag of Ukraine.

It was moved away from Hakaniemenranta because of construction of the Crown Bridges project. The sculpture was moved along the sea on a barge to storage in eastern Uusimaa. It was placed in storage and a pedestrian walkway will be built in its place. According to the Helsinki Art Museum, the sculpture will be returned near its current location after the construction.

== See also ==
- World Peace
