= Finland State Treasury =

State Treasury
- Finnish: Valtiokonttori

Government agency overview
- Formed: 1876; 150 years ago
- Headquarters: Sörnäisten Rantatie 13, Hakaniemi, Helsinki, Finland
- Employees: 348 (2023)
- Annual budget: €2.1 billion (2023)
- Minister responsible: Ministry of Finance
- Government agency executive: Timo Laitinen, Director-General
- Website: www.valtiokonttori.fi

Finland State Treasury (Finnish: Valtiokonttori; Swedish: Statskontoret) is a Finnish central agency operating under the Ministry of Finance. The State Treasury is responsible for state internal service production and development. This includes state financing activities, central accounting, financial management, and payment transactions, as well as reporting of state financial and personnel information, internal insurance operations of the state, and state inheritance.

The State Treasury employs approximately 300 people and has offices at Hakaniemi, Helsinki, at Sörnäisten Rantatie 13. The State Treasury also supports state organizations in the changing work environment, promotes data-driven decision-making, and develops municipal financial information services. The acting Director-General of the State Treasury is Timo Laitinen.

== History ==
The State Treasury was established by an imperial decree for the management of state finances. Prior to the establishment of the State Treasury, these tasks were the responsibility of the Bank of Finland. Emperor Alexander II approved the establishment of the State Treasury on June 30, 1875. The operations of the Finnish State Treasury began on January 1, 1876.

The State Treasury was entrusted with state assets, from which it was to make state expenditures and invest any surplus profitably. From 1901 to 1932, and again from 1965 onwards, it was also responsible for the supervision, accounting, and financial statements of state cash transactions, which at other times belonged to auditing authorities.

Later, its responsibilities were expanded to include the management of state securities, state debt management, and lending and borrowing activities. Since 1959, it has also been responsible for paying pensions and burial aid from state funds.

== Organization ==
The State Treasury is led by the Director-General, supported by the management team. The organisation of the State Treasury is made up of divisions. The substantive business areas are Citizen Services, Finance, Data, and Labor, and State Grant Services. Their operations are supported by the Administration and Development and Information Technology sectors. In addition, the State Treasury's organization includes Internal Audit directly under the Director-General's supervision.

- Citizen Services handles compensation and benefits for war invalids, war veterans, and their families, as well as military accident matters. The business area serves citizens in various compensation matters and provides statutory accident and insurance services to state agencies and institutions. The area also supervises the state's right to intestate estates and handles state discharge of payment obligations.
- Finance is responsible for state borrowing and debt and cash management. It administers loans, interest subsidies, and state guarantees.
- T3 – Finance, Data, and Labor oversees the state's consolidated financial reporting and guides and develops state financial management, payment transactions, and procurement activities. The area supports state organizations in change situations, promotes data-driven management, and develops municipal financial information services. The area also provides statutory analysis and reporting services to the Government.
- State Grant Services manages the publication and service of state grant applications, the state grant information repository, and the processing and management service for state grant authorities. The State Treasury is responsible for developing web services and providing support to all users of the service.

=== Directors-General of the State Treasury ===
==== Directors-in-chief ====
- Otto Reinhold Frenckell 1875–1879
- Sixtus Viktor Calamnius 1879–1891
- Wilhelm Gabriel Geitlin 1891–1903
- Juho Kusti Paasikivi 1903–1914
- Jonathan Wartiovaara 1915–1937
- Sigfrid Reguel Lundqvist (acting) 1937–1940

==== Directors-General ====
- Juhana Minni (acting 1948) 1940–1947
- Ralf Törngren 1948–1961
- Esa Kaitila 1962–1972
- Grels Teir 1973–1983
- Jaakko Vihmola 1983–1992
- Jukka Wuolijoki 1992–2008
- Timo Laitinen 2008–present
