= Hakaniemi =

Area in Helsinki, Finland

Coordinates: 60°10′45″N 24°57′02″E

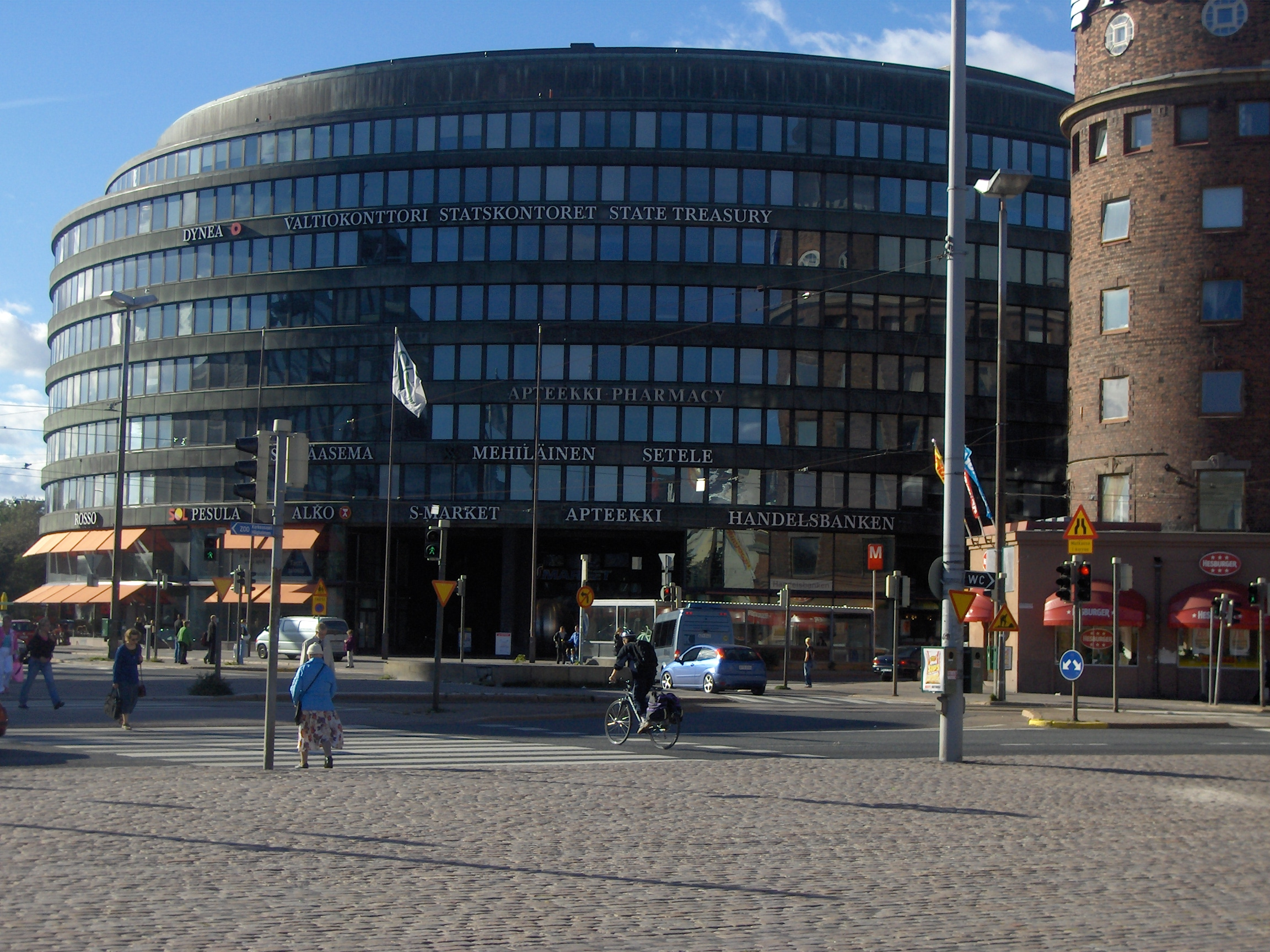
Hakaniemi's famous Ympyrätalo building

Hakaniemi (Finnish: [ˈhɑkɑˌnie̯mi]; Swedish: Hagnäs) is an unofficial district of Helsinki, the Finnish capital. It covers most of the neighbourhood of Siltasaari in the district of Kallio. Hakaniemi is located at the sea shore and is separated from the city centre by the Siltavuorensalmi strait and from the district of Linjat by the street Hämeentie. Historically, Hakaniemi was often associated with the working class and workers' associations. However, the cost of living has risen considerably in recent years and is now on par with that of the rest of central Helsinki.

The main office of the Central Organisation of Finnish Trade Unions (SAK), the party offices of the Social Democratic Party of Finland (SDP) and the Left Alliance, as well as the Helsinki workers' house Paasitorni are located in Hakaniemi. The May Day march of the working class in Helsinki usually starts at the Hakaniemi market square.

The best-known features of Hakaniemi include a large and lively marketplace, Oriental food stores with a good variety of Asian imported products the headquarters of several trade unions, the headquarters of the Social Democratic Party of Finland and the Left Alliance Party and the Helsinki Hilton hotel. Famous buildings include the round Ympyrätalo building (architects Heikki and Kaija Sirén, 1968) and the Hakaniemi market hall (architect Karl Hård af Segerstad, 1914).

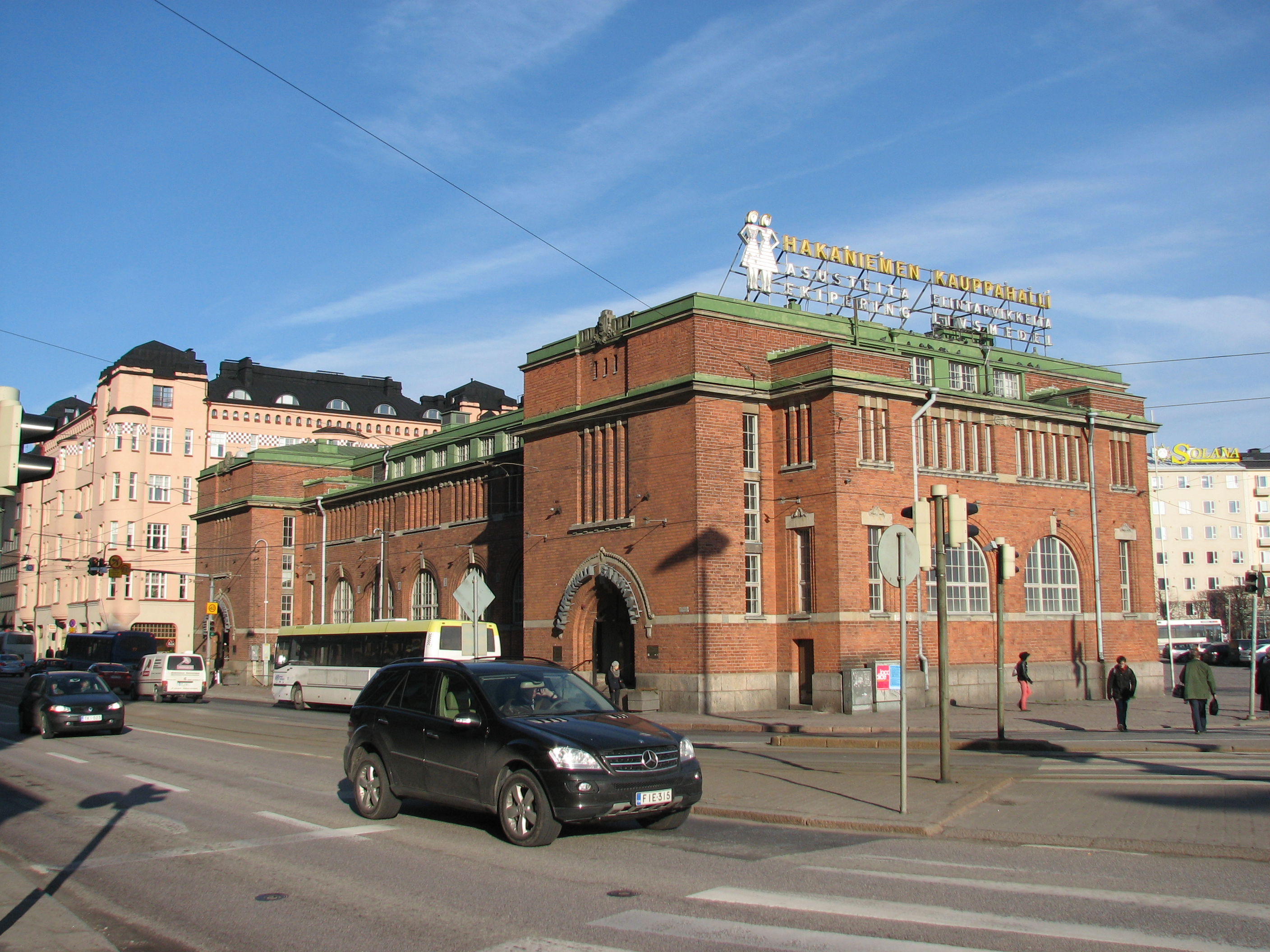
The Hakaniemi market hall is one of the three most important market halls in Helsinki. The other two are in the Market Square and in Hietalahti.

The Hakaniemi market square was built on reclaimed land. It has been the site of a farmers' market since 1897.

== Location ==
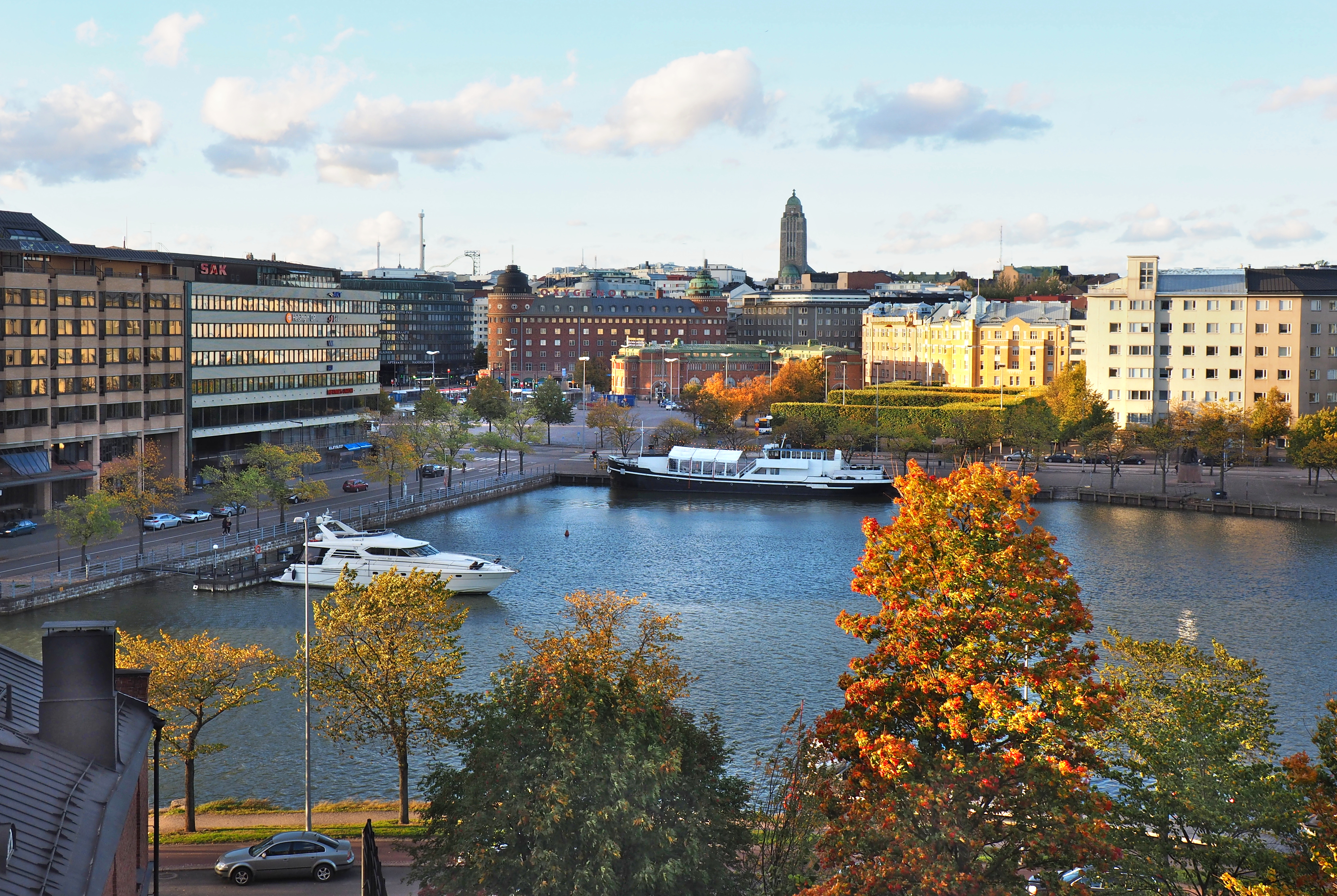
Hakaniemi seen from across the strait from the Siltavuori hill.

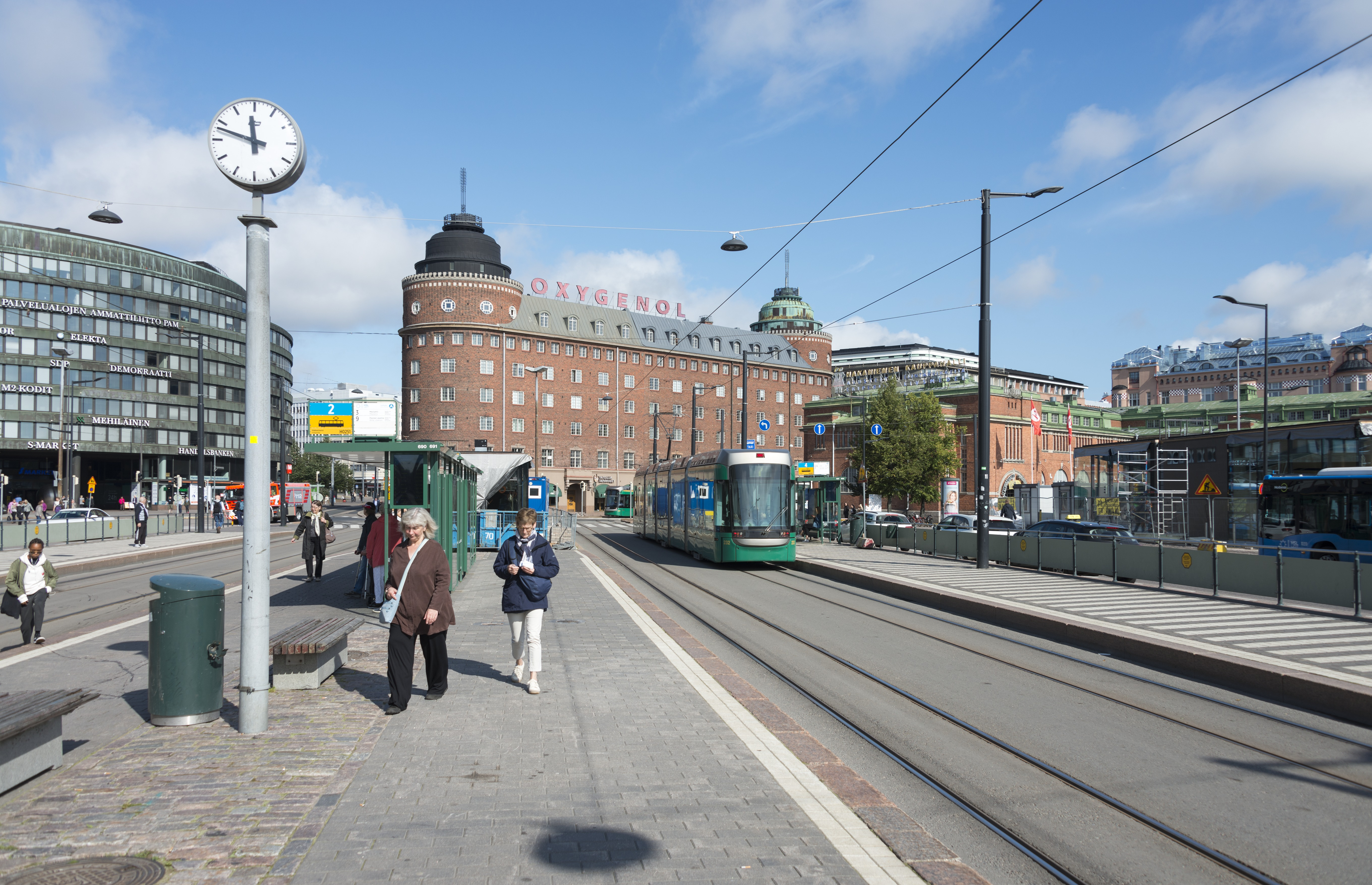
The street Siltasaarenkatu is a busy traffic route: there are many bus and tram stops near the Hakaniemi metro station. Hakaniemi is also a terminus of many bus lines to the neighbouring city of Vantaa.

Hakaniemi is located at the southern edge of the district of Kallio. It is separated from Kruununhaka by the Siltavuorensalmi strait, with the bridges Pitkäsilta and the Hakaniemi bridge crossing over it.

The official subdivision list of Helsinki does not contain any subdivision named Hakaniemi, and what exact area Hakaniemi encompasses is ambiguous. As the Hakaniemi area contains reclaimed land, it is no longer recognisable in its original peninsular form. Mostly Hakaniemi is thought of the area of the Hakaniemi market square with its immediate surroundings. This would make it include the eastern part of the neighbourhood of Siltasaari and the southernmost part of the neighbourhood of Linjat; often it is also thought of including the neighbourhood of Merihaka, which belongs to the district of Sörnäinen. The Hakaniemi metro station is located partly in Siltasaari, partly in Linjat. The street Hakaniemenranta starts at Siltaarenkatu and continues to Merihaka, going around it along the sea shore, as a pedestrian street at its easternmost part. The sculpture World peace is located along this coastal street, near a pier offering boat connections to various Helsinki islands such as Vallisaari in the summertime.

Originally Hakaniemi was a peninsula clearly sticking out into the sea, located at the area between the present locations of the market square and Merihaka. It was separated from Siltasaari by a narrow strait running diagonally across the area of the present market square. In the late 18th century there was a pasture for farm animals at the peninsula, called Generalshagen, and the entire peninsula was named Hagnäs (Swedish for "pasture cape") already at the time. The corresponding Finnish name was Hagnääsi in the 1880s and Hakaniemi since 1909. The peninsula has given its name to the Hakaniemi market hall, the streets of Hakaniemenkatu and Hakaniemenkuja, the Hakaniemi metro station, the Hakaniemi park, the street Hakaniemenranta, the Hakaniemi bridge, the Hakaniemi market square and the street Hakaniemen torikatu.

== History ==
=== Land reclamation ===
The first bridges over the Töölönlahti bay were built in 1651 for the road leading from Vironniemi (Kruununhaka) to Vanhakaupunki. When the bridges were rebuilt in 1832, the islands in the bay were named Iso Siltasaari and Pikku Siltasaari. The bridge from Siltavuori to Iso Siltasaari was called Pitkäsilta and the bridge over Pikku Siltasaari was called Pikkusilta.

Land reclamation in the strait separating Siltasaari from the mainland on its northern and eastern sides, containing the Hakaniemi area at the time, at the present location of the market square, started in 1886. This land reclamation used dredging soil from the Sörnäinen harbour. To stop reclaimed land from flowing into the sea, a dam was built from soil, rocks and spruce trunks. Soon after the reclamation was completed, the dam gave in. As there was plenty of dredging soil available, a new dam was built further away in the bay. In 1891 the Pikkusilta bridge still remained, but it had been left on dry land. The market square area dried up slowly and had to be crossed on duckboards. The land reclamation took a total of eleven years, and market vendors started sales in the area on Christmas 1897.

=== Home of the working class ===
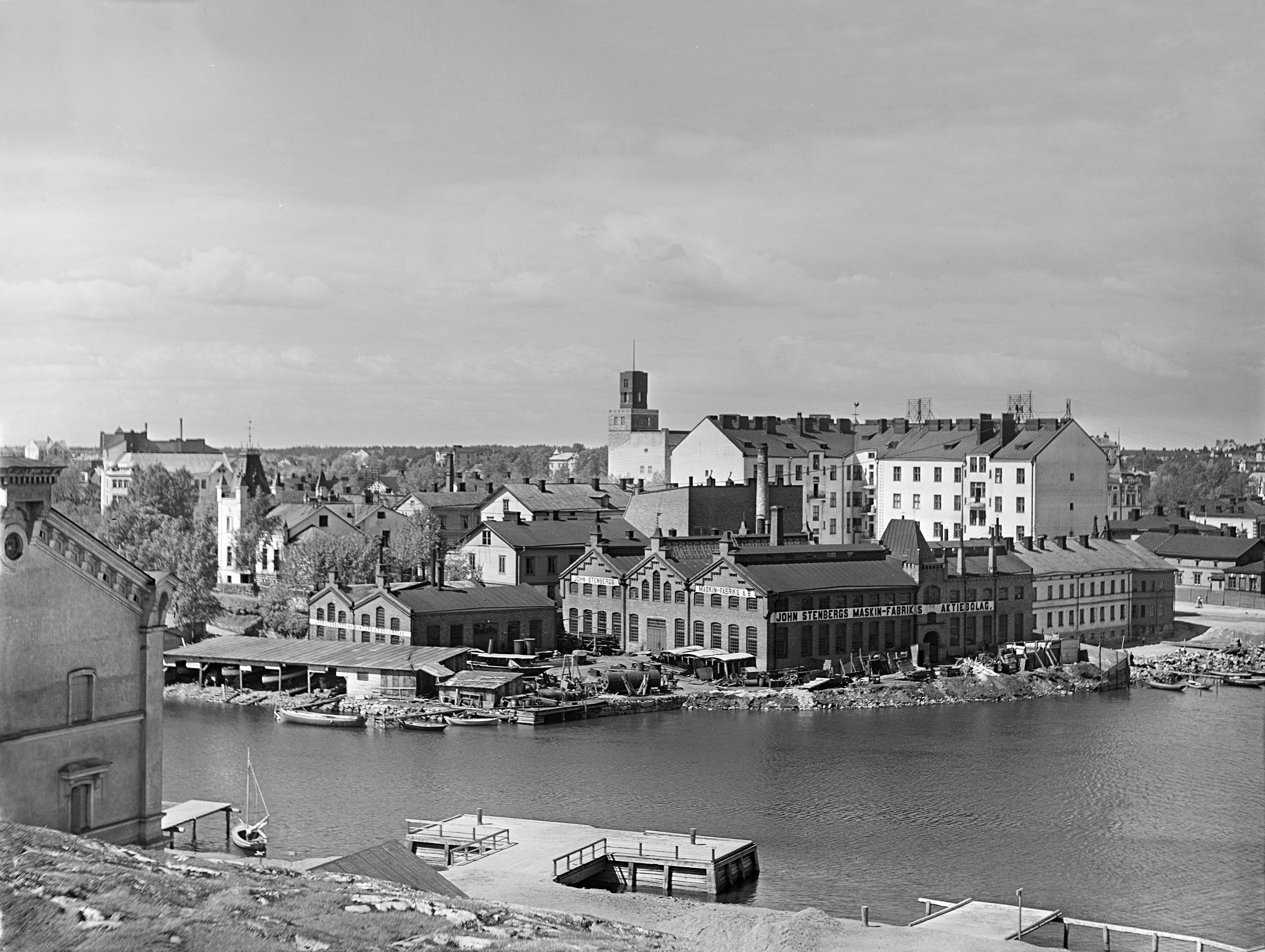
A view of Siltasaari from 1908. The John Stenberg workshop is at the front and the tower of the Helsinki workers' house is in the middle of the picture.

Up to the 19th century Hakaniemi was just a peaceful pasture. The city of Helsinki started to regulate construction to the north of Pitkäsilta since the 1820s. In 1846 the area was divided into villa and industrial lots, which the city leased with long-term contracts. Lands further away were dealt as fields and pastures. In the late 19th century the city of Helsinki started rapidly industrialising and factories were built in the Sörnäinen area. At the same time, increased rents in the city centre drove the working class further away, and Hakaniemi located on the opposite end of the Pitkäsilta bridge soon became a popular place to live in.

Pitkäsilta soon became a symbol of the class difference between the bourgeoisie in the city centre and the proletariat in the north. Hakaniemi, known as the home for many trade unions, was coloured red and many demonstrations were held at the Hakaniemi market square. During the 1906 Sveaborg rebellion the so-called Hakaniemi riot took place at the market square, which has been seen as the first clash between the red and white guards in Finland. The reds later planned a revolution at the so-called "Granite Castle", the Helsinki workers' house at Säästöpankinranta. The Finnish Civil War is thought to have started when a red lantern was hoisted on the top of the tower at the workers' house in the evening of 26 January 1918 as a sign of revolution.

=== Later phases ===
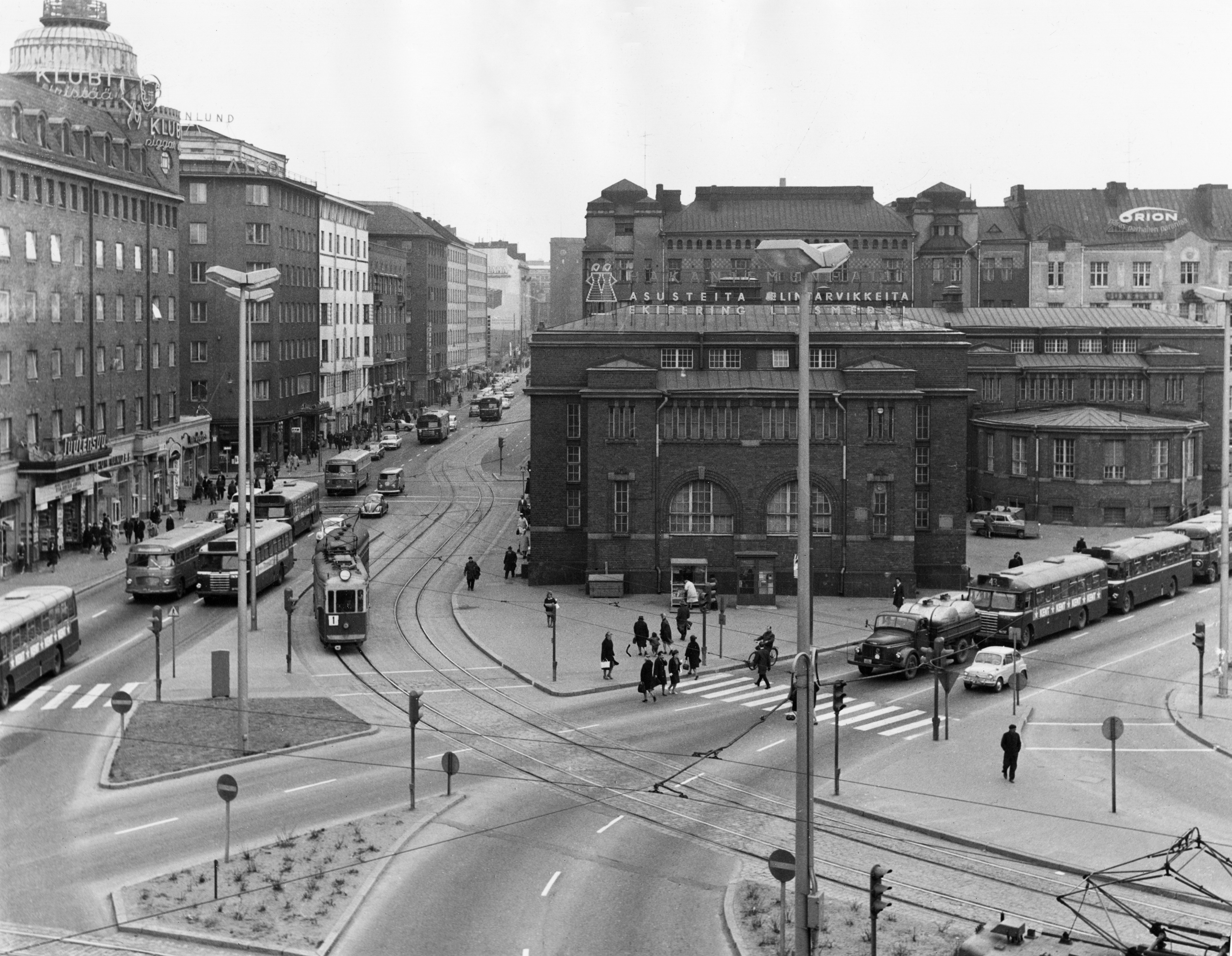
Traffic in front of the Hakaniemi market hall in 1966.

In the 1920s the industry in the area was seen as unfit to the urban image, and the Siltasaari area started to become an extension of the business centre. In 1925 Hakaniemi became a public transport hub as it started serving as a terminus for bus transport. In the early 1930s half of the Helsinki tram lines passed through Hakaniemi. The southern sidetrack of the Sörnäinen harbour rail was used to transport firewood to the Hakaniemi market square, used to heat the houses in the area. A bus terminal was built at the market square in 1963.

After the war, the wooden houses in the area were replaced with multi-storey brick and stone houses, many new businesses and government institutions moved to the area, and the population of forty thousand slowly started to decrease.

To stop the population for decreasing, the neighbourhood of Merihaka, a "concrete neighbourhood" similar to Itä-Pasila was built next to Hakaniemi. The population still kept on decreasing, and by the 1980s, the entire district of Kallio only had twenty thousand inhabitants.

== Projects ==
The Crown Bridges project was started in 2016, including a ten-kilometre-long tram connection and three new bridges between the city centre, Hakaniemi and Yliskylä. A temporary terminus will be built between Laajasalo and Hakaniemi, and tram traffic is expected to start in 2027.

Many new buildings are planned in the area around Hakaniemenranta, Merihaka and Sörnäisten rantatie. The Norwegian Arthur Burchardt would like to build a new hotel near the World peace sculpture. A new bridge will be built next to the deteriorated Hakaniemi bridge, after which the old bridge will be dismantled.

A new railway station is planned next to the Hakaniemi metro station as part of the Helsinki City Rail Loop. A new service yard is being built underneath the market hall, and a new parking garage is being planned underneath the market square.

== Pictures ==
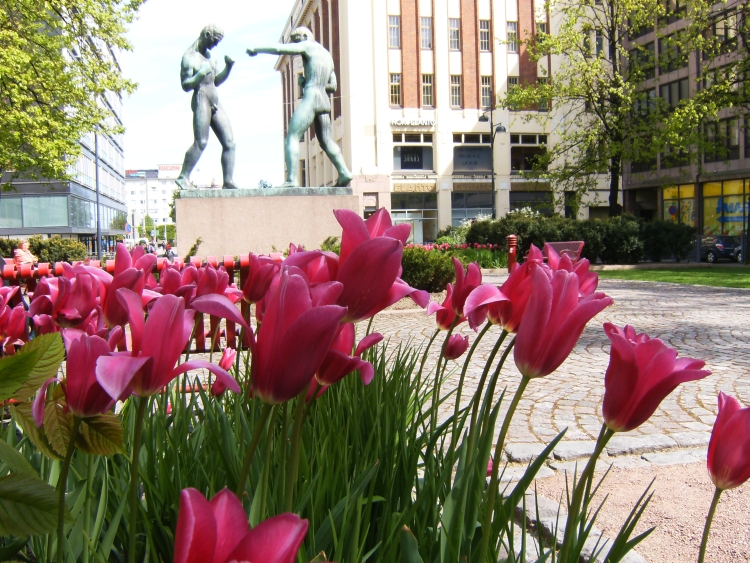
Statue by Johannes Haapasalo.

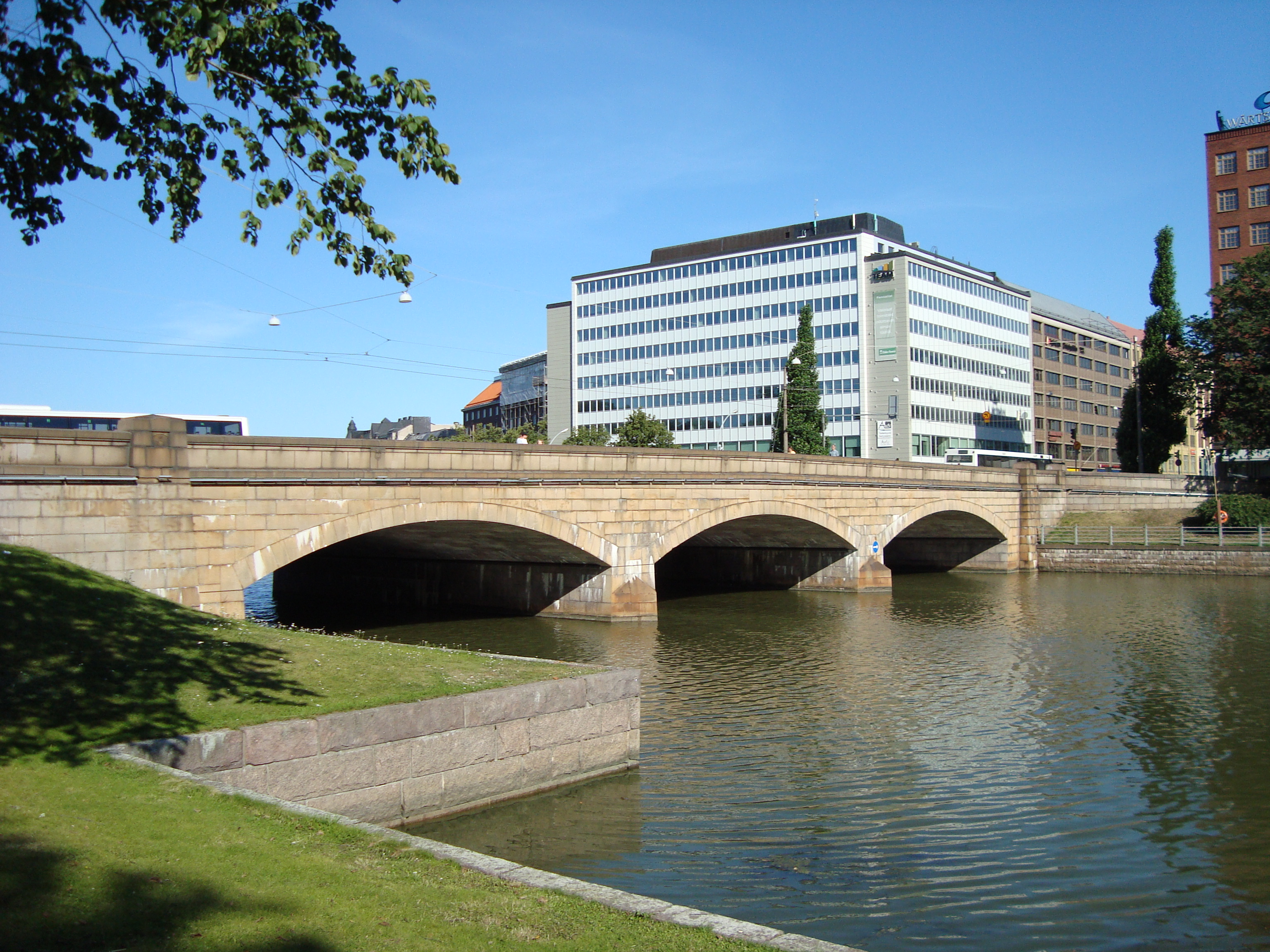
Pitkäsilta bridge between hakaniemi and Kruununhaka.

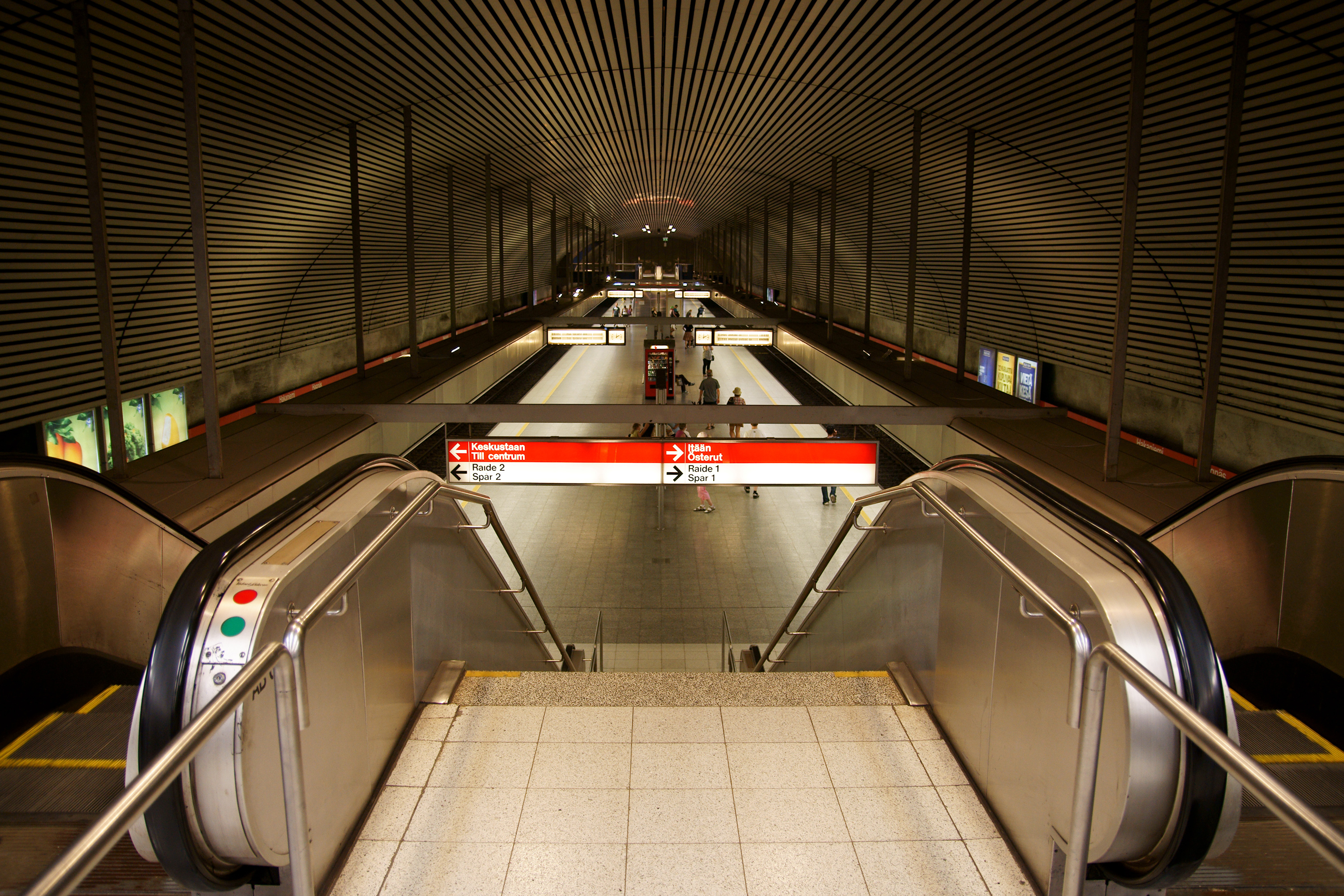
Hakaniemi metro station was opened in 1982.

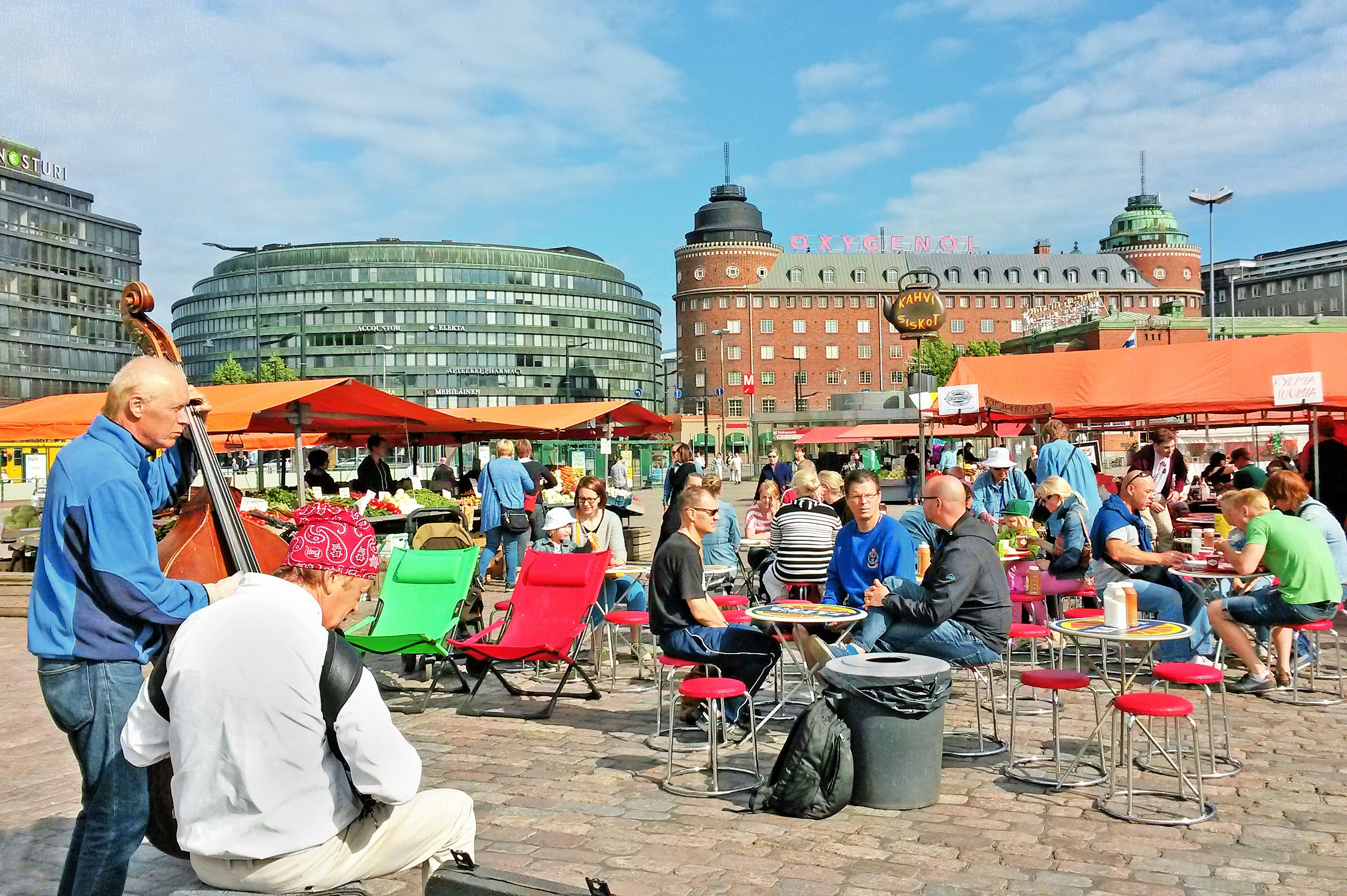
The Hakaniemi market square.

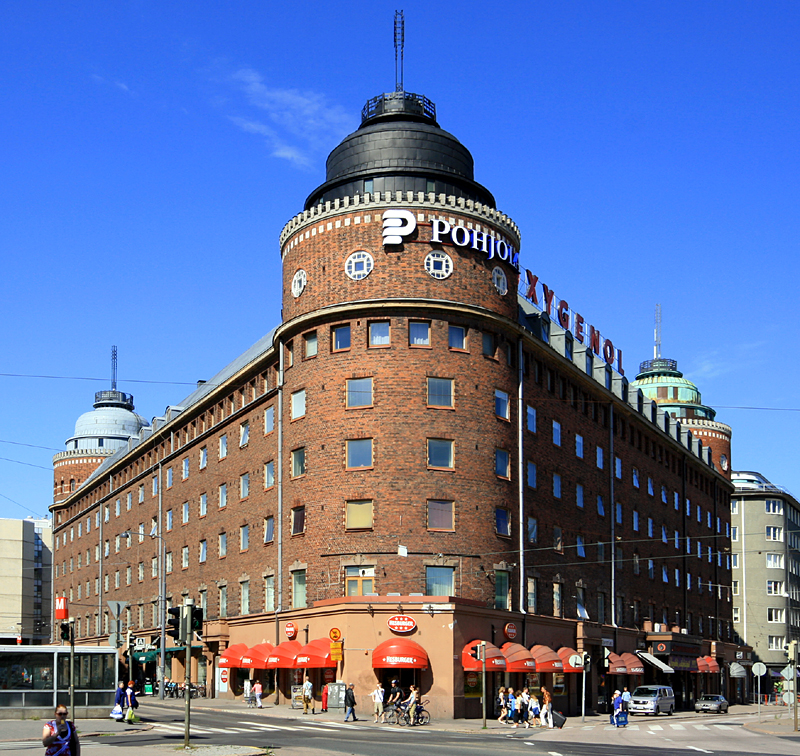
The Arena house.

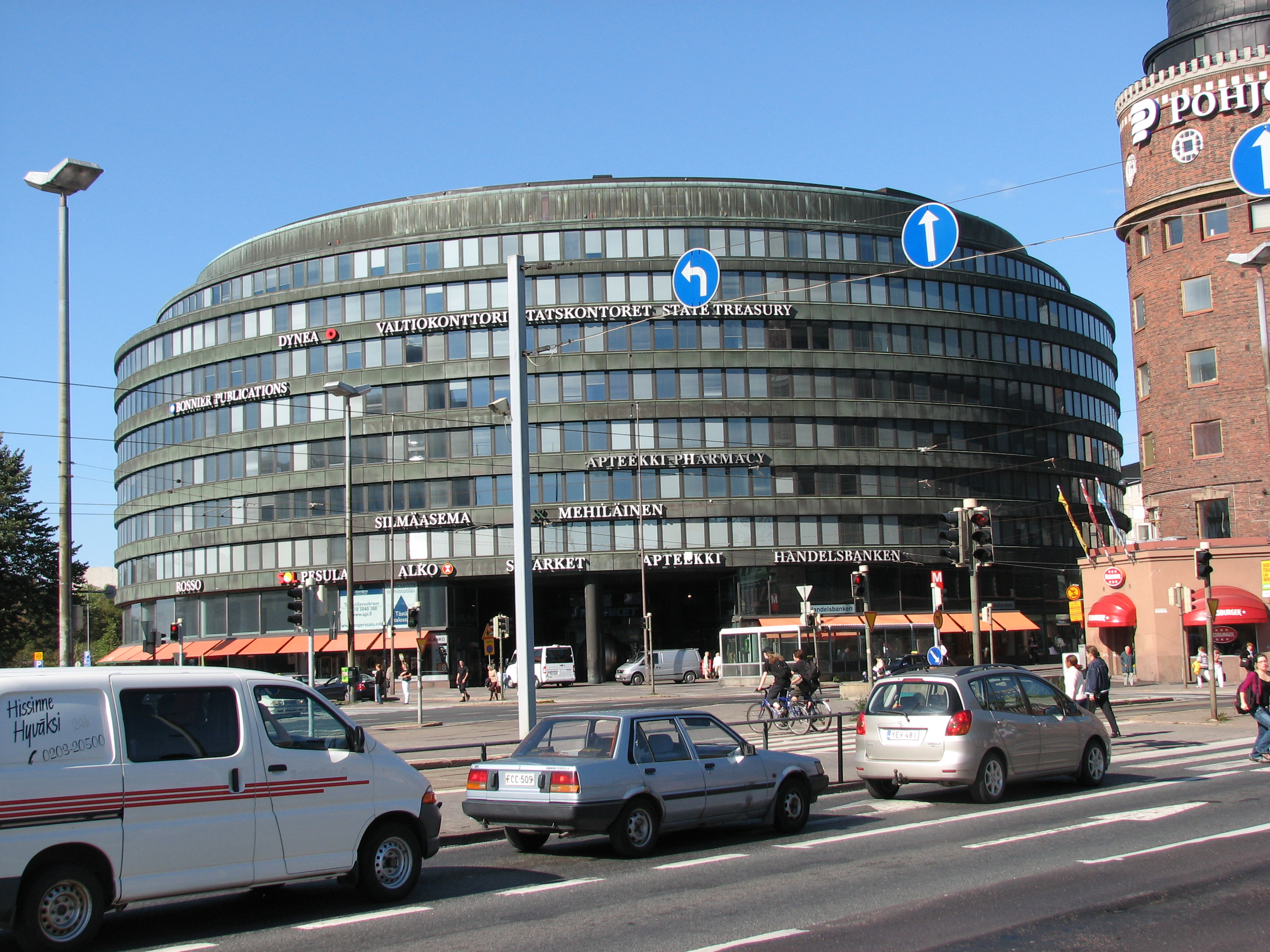
Ympyrätalo.

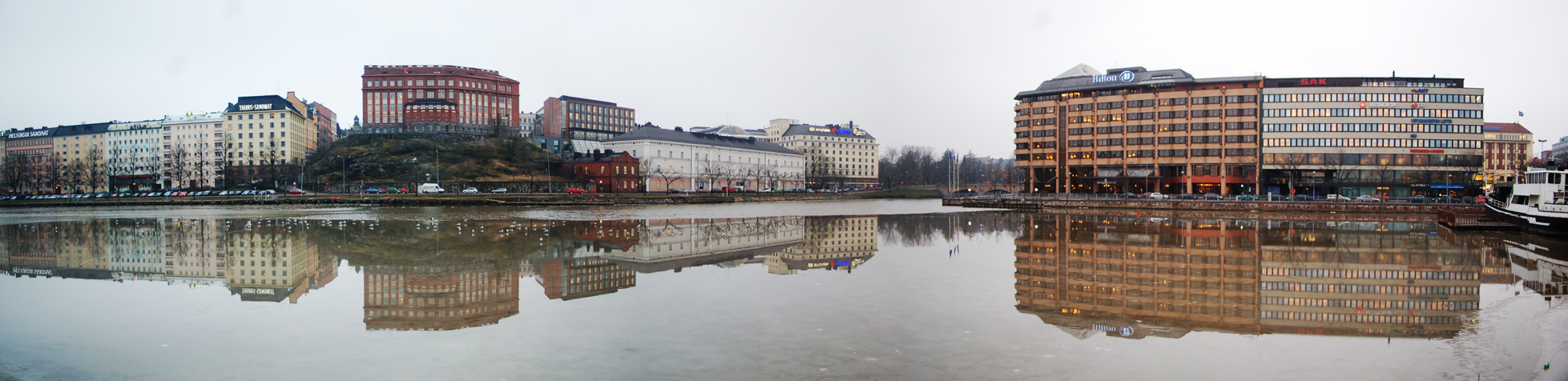
Siltavuorensalmi.

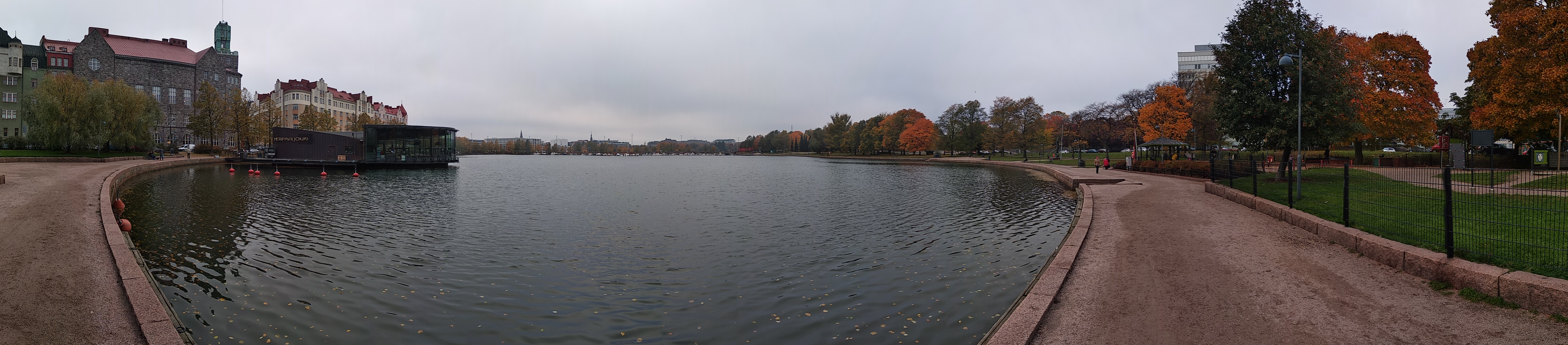
Eläintarhanlahti.

== See also ==
- Merihaka
- Kallio
- Hakaniemi metro station
