= Hakaniemenranta =

Street in Helsinki, Finland

Coordinates: 60°10′41.78″N 24°57′9.66″E

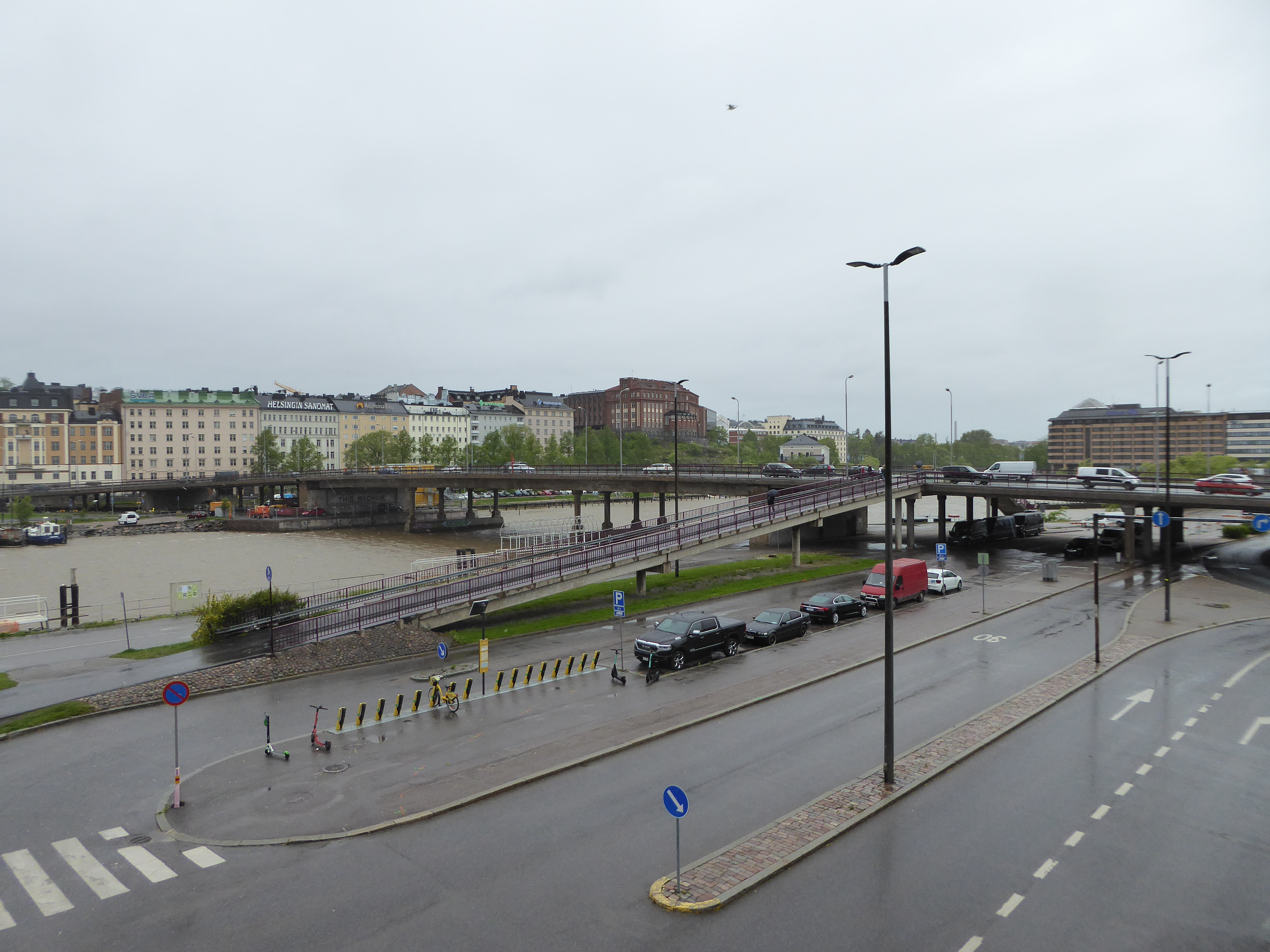
Hakaniemenranta and the 1960s Hakaniemi bridge, demolished in 2024 after being replaced with a new one.

The eastern part of the street in Merihaka.

Hakaniemenranta (Swedish: Hagnäskajen) is a street on the Siltavuorensalmi shore in central Helsinki, Finland. The street belongs to two separate districts: the western part belongs to Hakaniemi in Kallio, while the eastern part belongs to the Merihaka residential area in Sörnäinen.

== History ==
The original name of the street since 1908 was Hagnäsin rantakatu after the Swedish name of the Hakaniemi district. In the next year it was renamed Hakaniemen rantakatu. The street got its current name in 1928.

After the street Sörnäisten rantatie was widened into a larger street leading to the Itäväylä highway in the early 1960s, Hakaniemenranta also became part of the passage leading from Itäväylä to the city centre over the Pitkäsilta bridge. The other connection from Itäväylä to the city centre leads via the Hakaniemi bridge built at the same time and the Pohjoisranta street. Hakaniemenranta still has four lanes even though traffic on it has significantly decreased today.

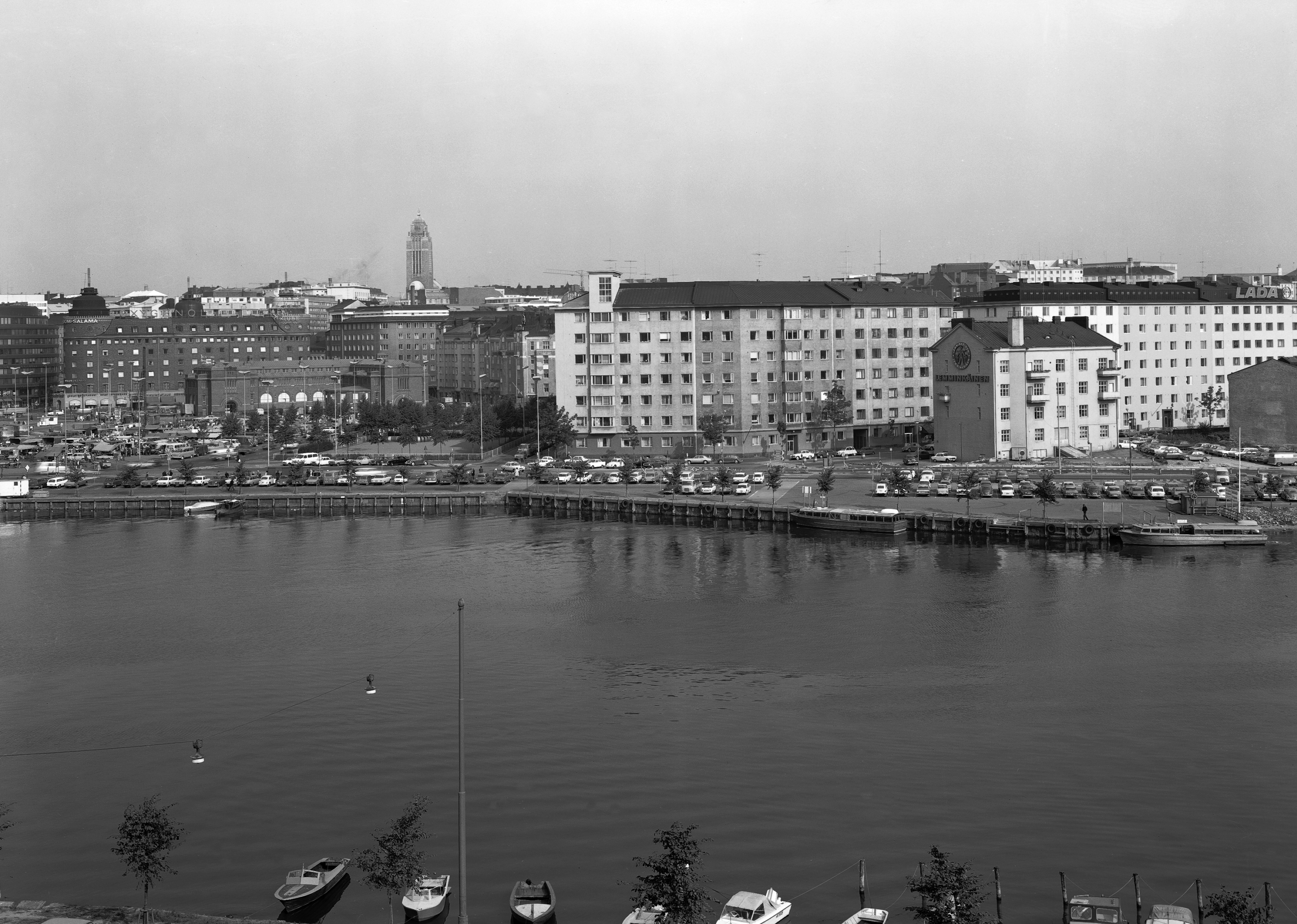
Hakaniemenranta seen from the other side of the strait from Kruununhaka in 1973.

== Projects ==
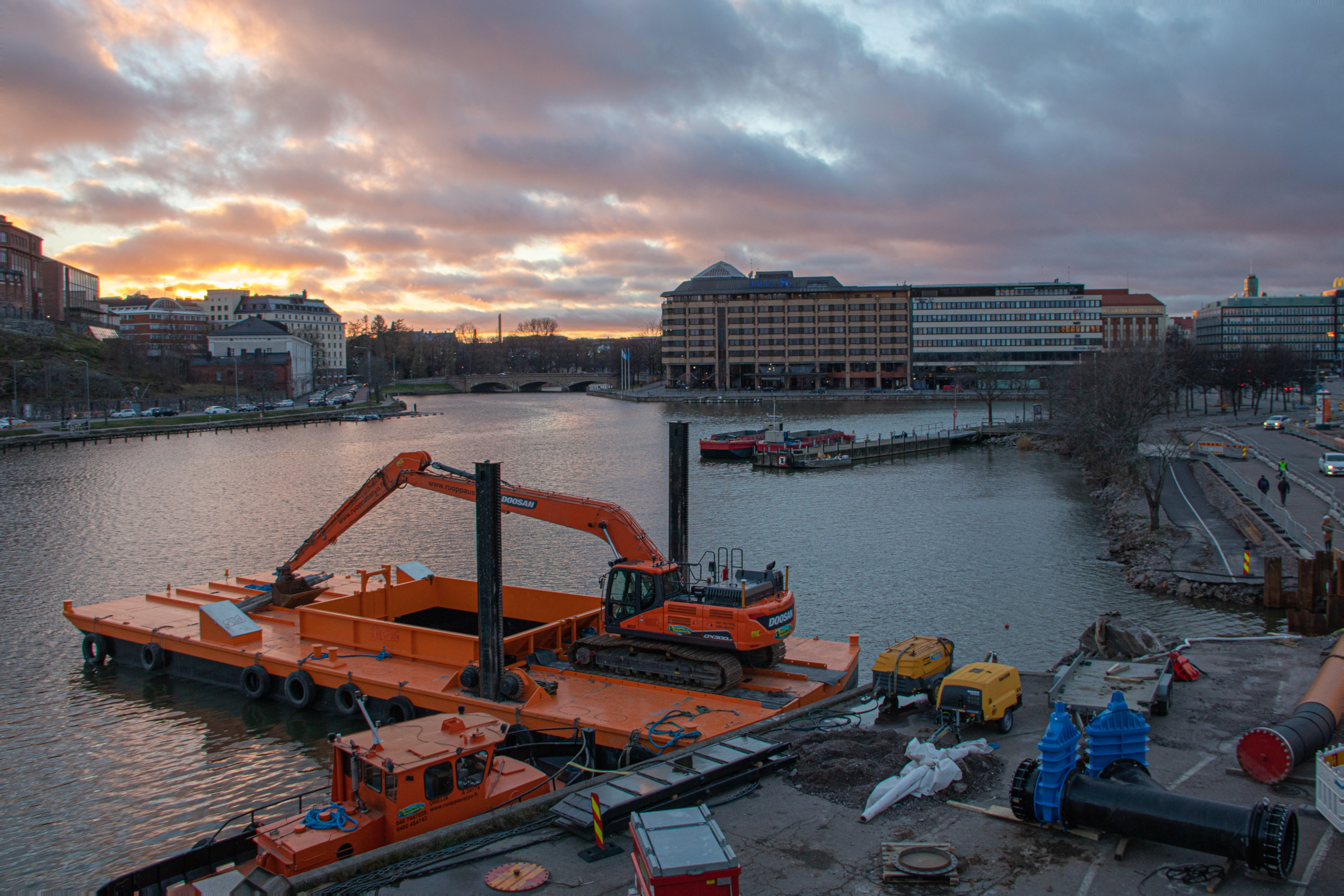
There are land reclamation projects in Siltavuorensalmi. A dredge barge and its towboat seen at Hakaniemenranta in autumn 2021.

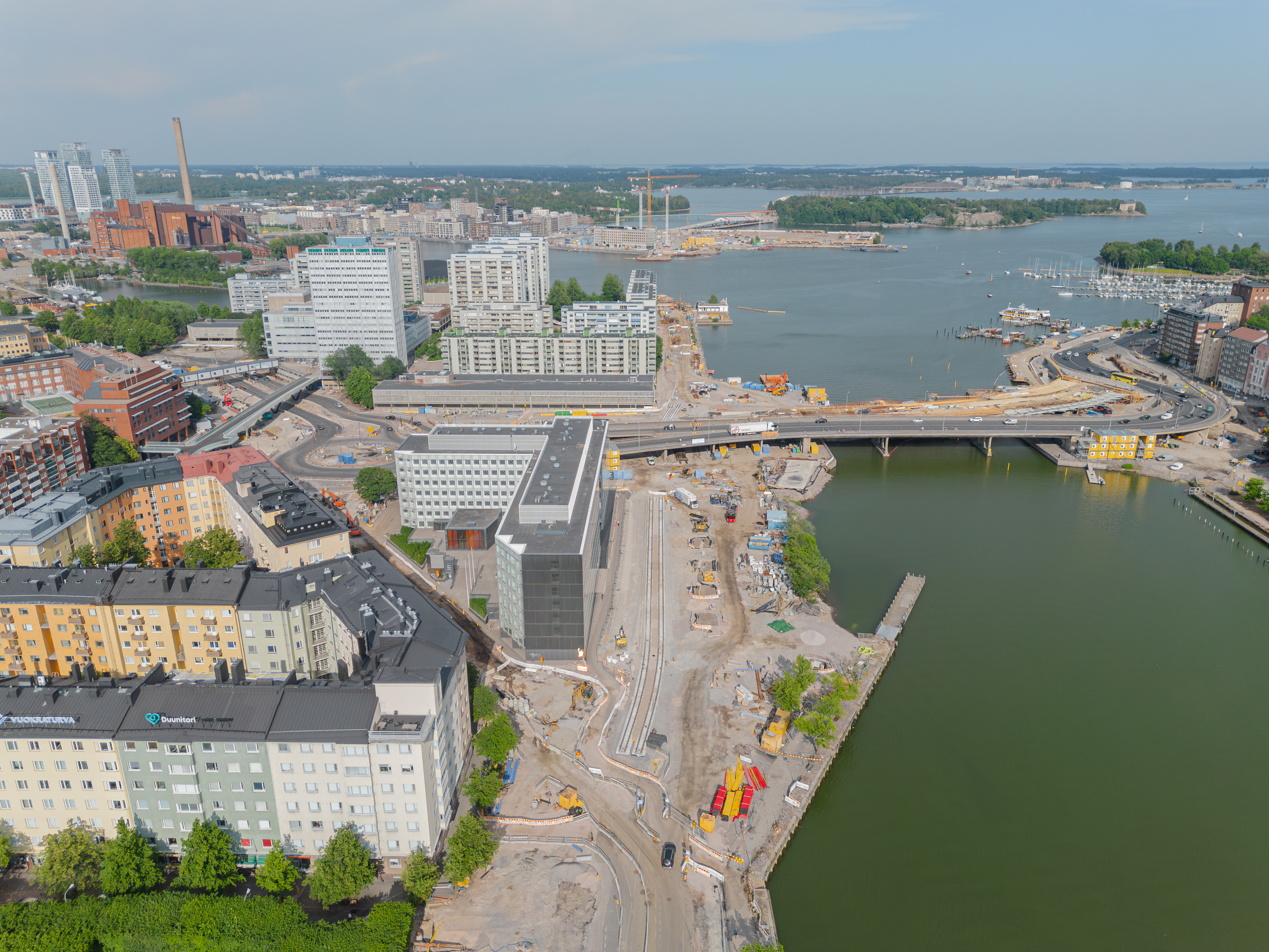
Hakaniemenranta in June 2023.

In the 2020s, tram tracks were built on Hakaniemenranta as part of the Kruunusillat project between the Helsinki Central Station and Laajasalo. A bridge about 400 metres long was built from the Kulttuurisauna building at the eastern end of the street to the Nihti island. The construction work on the bridge damaged the Kulttuurisauna, which had to be repaired.

Siltavuorensalmi will be partly filled with reclaimed land, and a hotel and new 7-floor apartment buildings will be built along Hakaniemenranta. There are plans for apartments for about 1250 inhabitants along the street. The Hakaniemi bridge was replaced with a new bridge, which connects to the Hakaniemenranta street on the same level, eliminating the current ramp connections.

Two tram stops will be built on the street, one at the western end at the Hakaniemi market square and one in front of the Merihaka area. The market square stop will serve as a temporary terminus for the first two years of traffic, and the connection to the central station will be opened in the second phase of the project.
