= Sörnäisten rantatie =

Street in Helsinki, Finland

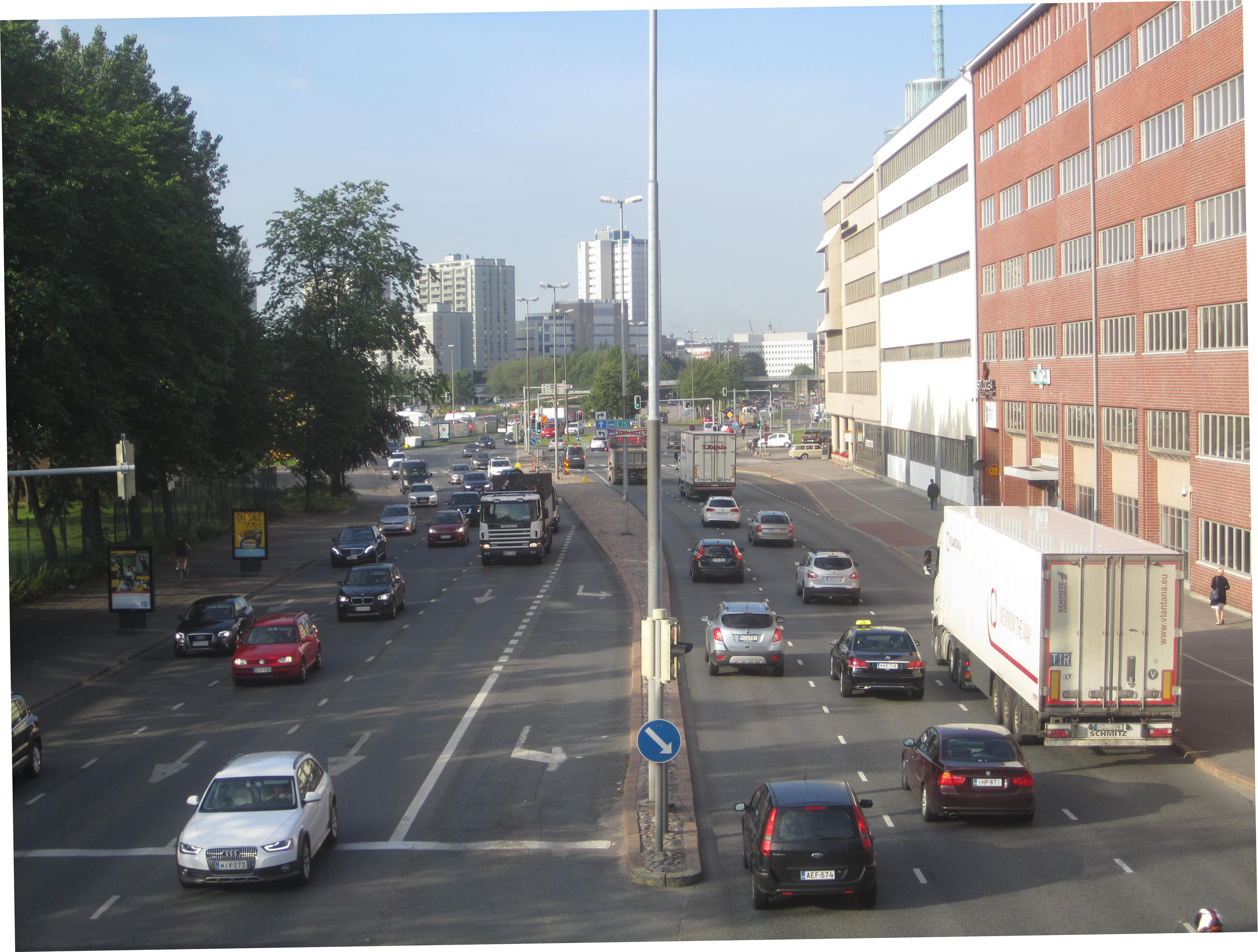
A view to the south from a pedestrian bridge over the street near Vilhonvuorenkatu.

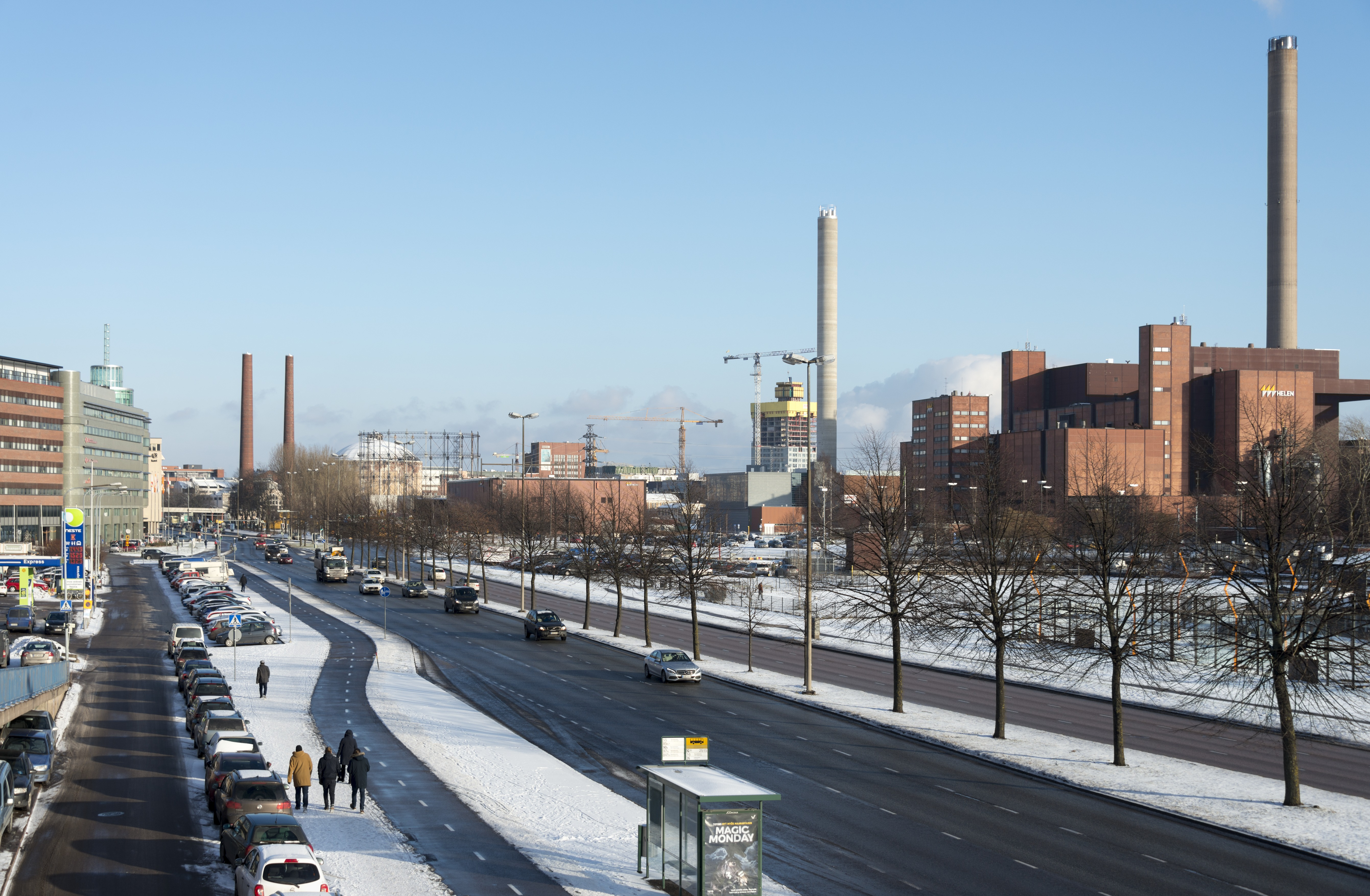
A view to the north. On the background on the right is the Hanasaari Power Plant.

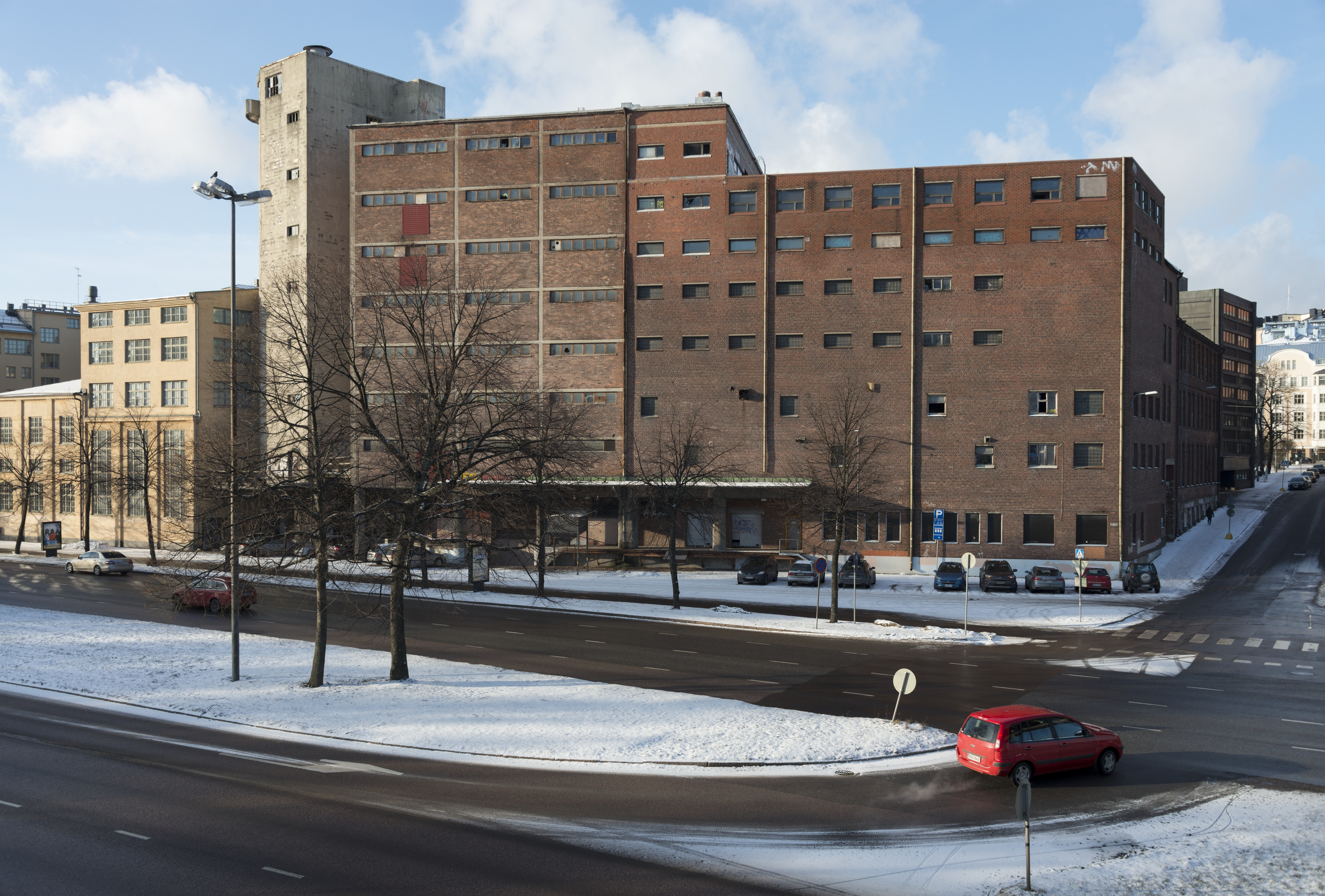
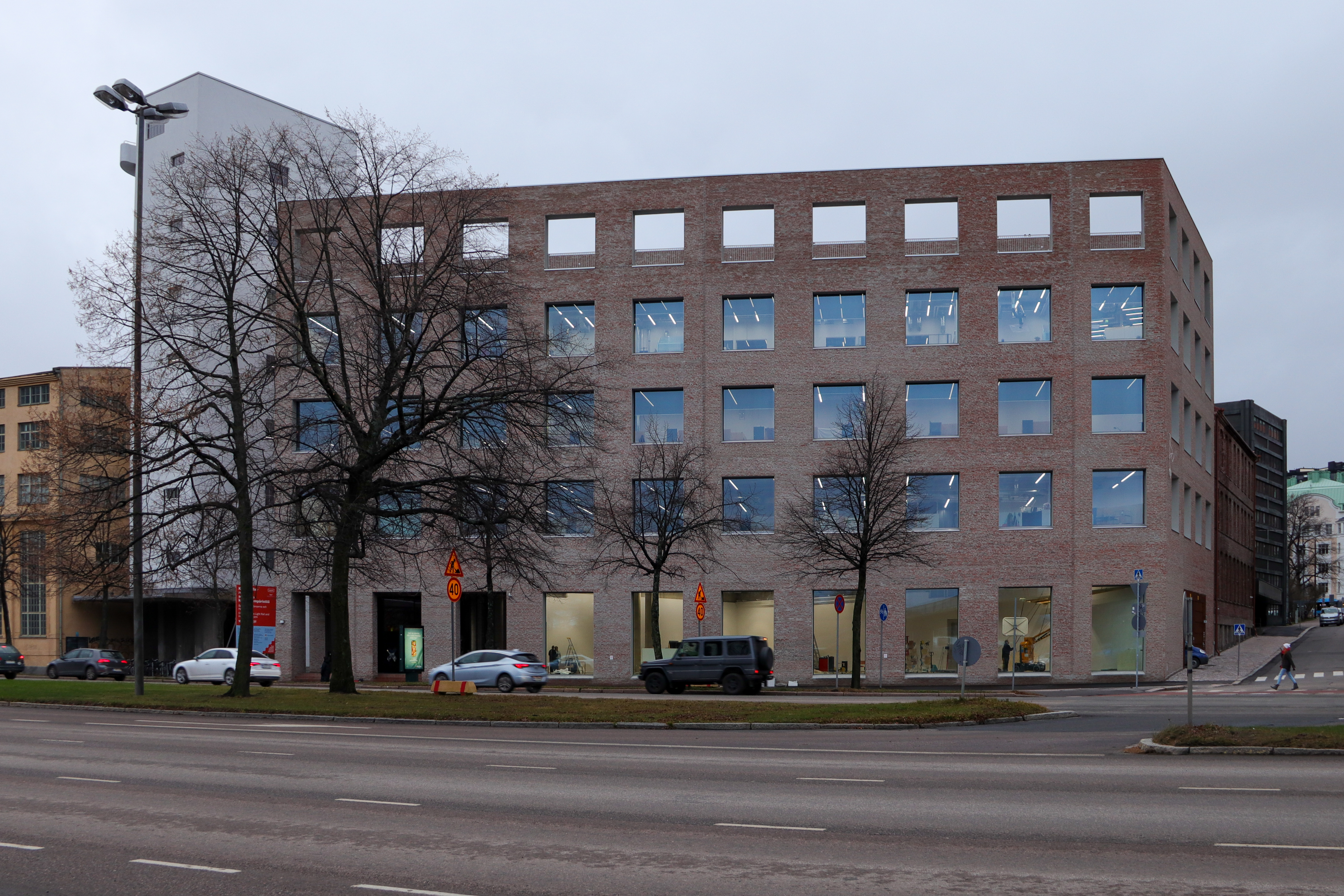
An abandoned mill on Sörnäisten rantatie in 2018, later replaced by Academy of Fine Arts main building Mylly ("mill", Sörnäisten rantatie 19).

Sörnäisten rantatie (Swedish: Sörnäs strandväg) is a wide street in Sörnäinen, Helsinki, Finland. It leads from the Hakaniemi market square to Suvilahti near the Kalasatama metro station.

Sörnäisten rantatie is a high-traffic road connecting Itäväylä to the city centre. It is also part of the European route E75. As well as Itäväylä, the street Hermannin rantatie also branches off from an intersection at the northern end of the street, going towards Lahdenväylä. The Hakaniemi bridge connects Sörnäisten rantatie to Pohjoisranta, leading to the Helsinki Market Square.

Nowadays Sörnäisten rantatie is the most important traffic connection between the eastern and northeastern radial entrance roads to Helsinki (Tuusulanväylä, Lahdenväylä, Itäväylä) connecting them to the city centre.

== History ==
Earlier, Sörnäisten rantatie was mostly an interior street in the industrial and harbour area, with a railway track branching off from the Sörnäinen harbour rail to the Hakaniemi market square running along it. It was started to expand to a larger traffic road in the early 1950s when the new Kulosaari Bridge was being constructed. The Hakaniemi bridge was completed in 1961, connecting Sörnäisten rantatie to Pohjoisranta in Kruununhaka and onwards to the South Harbour. As traffic originally went via Hakaniemenranta to the Pitkäsilta bridge, the Hakaniemenranta street remained a four-lane street until early 2020s, even though the traffic did not support this any more.

Sörnäisten rantatie connected the bridges and created a main route from Itäinen moottoritie (now known as Itäväylä) to the centre as the new East Helsinki spread to the former loosely populated areas. As traffic increased in the 1960s and 1970s the street was expanded bit by bit to six lanes wide.

The traffic on both Itäväylä and Sörnäisten rantatie decreased significantly when the Helsinki Metro was opened in 1982.

Vladimir Lenin lived at Sörnäisten rantatie 1 from August to September 1917 at the house of Helsinki militia chief Kustaa Rovio.

From 1995 to 1997 the international car racing contest Helsinki Thunder took place on a 3.3 km long track near Sörnäisten rantatie.

The westernmost part of original Sörnäisten rantatie, near the Hakaniemi market square, has become a separate, low-traffic side street. This part of the street was renamed "Miina Sillanpään katu" ("Miina Sillanpää Street") in 2022.

As outlined in the city plan, a new street called Merihaankatu was established between Sörnäisten rantatie and the new Hakaniemi Bridge in 2024. It was constructed primarily on the site of the large traffic ramps of the old Hakaniemi bridge. Merihaankatu intersects with Hakaniemenranta and transitions into Sörnäisten rantatie a little further north, near Miina Sillanpää Street and the Näkinsilta footbridge. Merihaankatu was opened to traffic on 20 May 2024, with the inauguration of the new Hakaniemi bridge.

== Tunnel plan ==
There are plans to ease the traffic to the north to Hermannin rantatie with a tunnel. The planned 1.6 km long Sörnäinen tunnel would reach from Vilhonvuorenkatu near Sörnäisten rantatie to Hermanni to the south of Haukilahdenkatu. There are also plans to connect the tunnel to the proposed Helsinki central tunnel, which could continue all the way to Länsiväylä. The tunnel would cost at least 180 million euros. According to Raine Mäntysalo, professor of strategic urban design at Aalto University, the tunnel would increase automobile traffic and worsen the environment for pedestrians and cyclists, conflicting with the city's strategic goals.
