= Hakaniemi market hall =

Building in Helsinki, Finland

Coordinates: 60°10′48″N 24°57′04″E

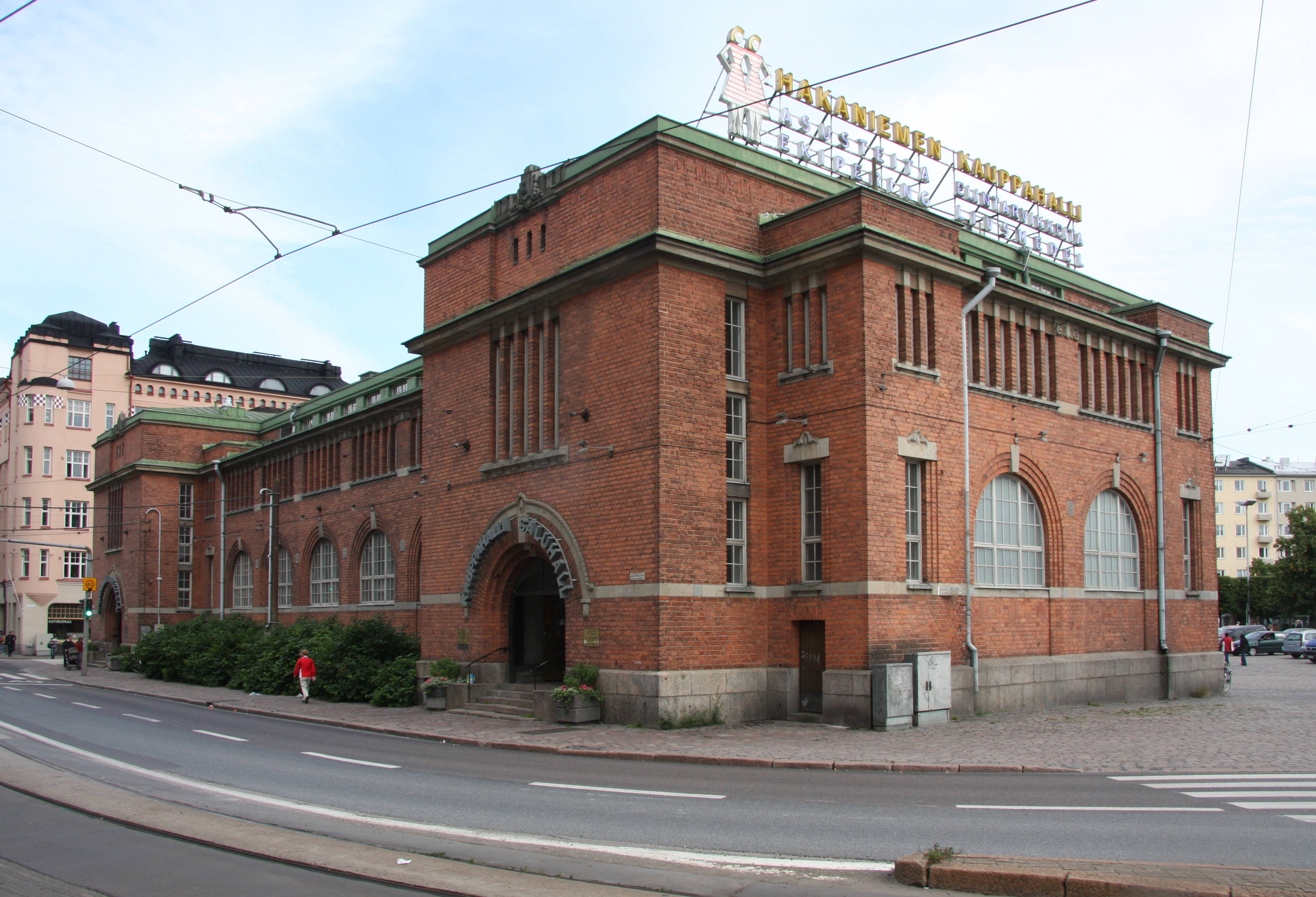
The market hall seen from Hämeentie.

The Hakaniemi market hall (Finnish: Hakaniemen kauppahalli, Swedish: Hagnäs saluhall) is a market building at the Hakaniemi market square in the district of Kallio in Helsinki, Finland. It was built at the start of the street Hämeentie in 1914.

The market hall underwent basic reparations from 2018 to 2023. During the reparations, the market operated at a heated temporary building, which was dismantled once the reparations were complete.

== History ==
=== Background ===
On 20 October 1908 the City Council of Helsinki decided to reserve a lot located at the Hakaniemi market square along the street Itäinen Viertotie (now known as Hämeentie) for building a market hall. Architect Einar Flinckenberg, deputy architect of the house architecture department of the city of Helsinki from 1910 to 1920, made two plans for a new market hall: a one-floor building solely for grocery sales and a two-floor building for both grocery sales and other sales. In 1911 the city council gave the monetary action chamber the task of designing complete sketches for the new market hall with cost and worth calculations.

Even though the two-floor building was more expensive, it was seen as more economically viable and aesthetically better. As experience had shown that trade in specialised market halls suffered, a diverse selection of products for sale was seen as better. This would also allow reorganising the trade of the entire market square. Market sales in Hakaniemi had begun already at Christmas 1897, and especially sales of coffee and food from fixed kiosks had caused problems with the general order.

On 14 November 1911 the city council made a decision to build the two-floor market hall. The market hall building would include 32 cellars, the side building would include 11 fish stores, the bottom floor would include 114 grocery stores and the top floor would include 103 stores for cloth and leather, metal, dishes, clay artworks and handicraft products.

=== Construction and opening ===
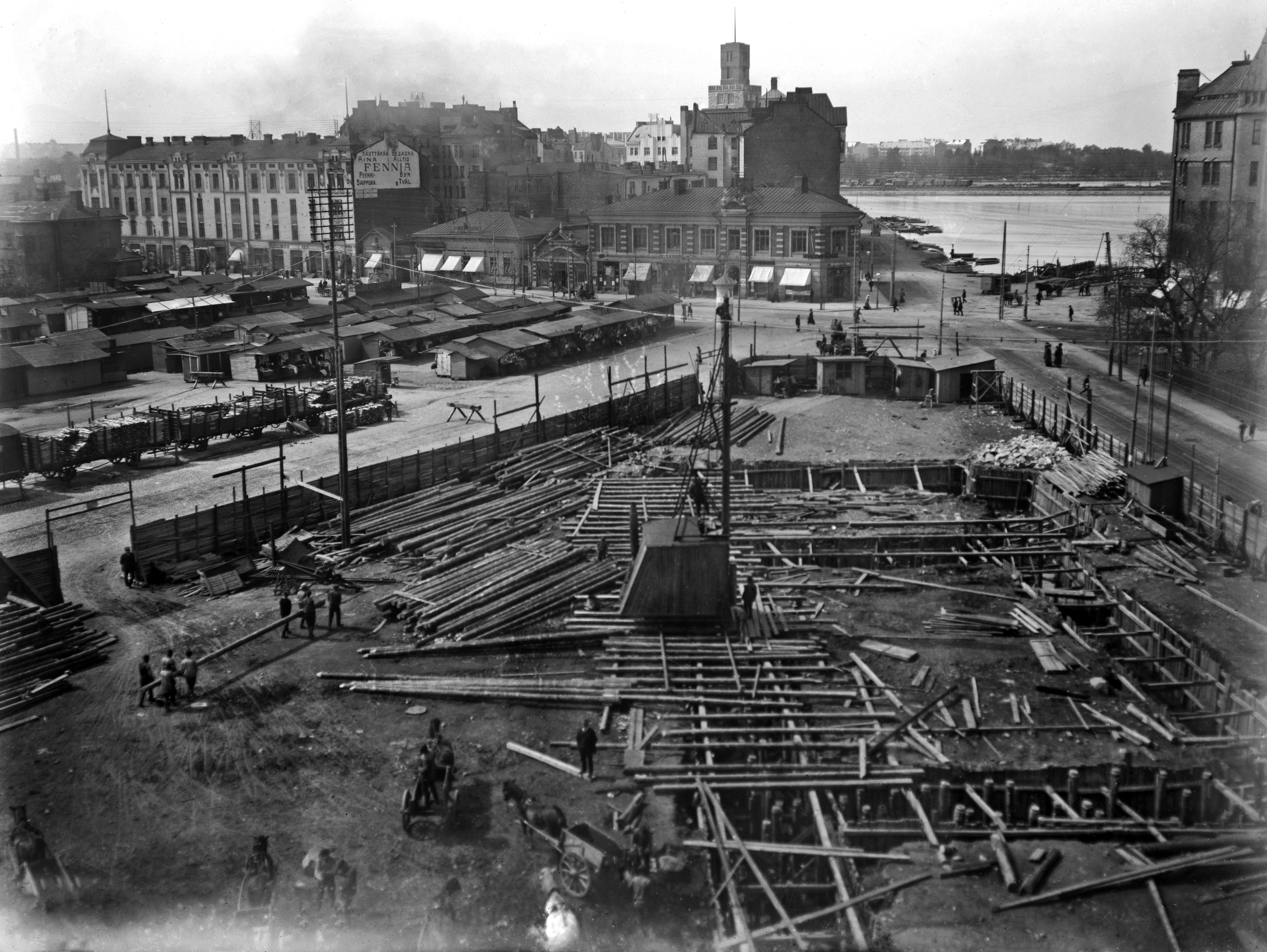
Construction of the market hall from 1912 to 1914.

The final blueprints for the market hall were made in June 1912. The blueprints bear the signatures of both Einar Flinckenberg and city architect Karl Hård af Segerstad who served as the city architect of Helsinki from 1907 to 1921, but Flinckenberg was seen as the main architect of the building. In 1912 the support beams, foundation and stone layout of the market hall building were made. After a workers' strike had stopped the construction autumn had already progressed so far that masonry work could not be started. In the next year the market hall was completed except for its interior. The market hall, which was hailed as the largest and most modern in all of Europe, was opened on 1 June 1914. On the same day, sales of food and cloths at the Hakaniemi market square were forbidden, only sales of "common products for the people" and salted fish were allowed. The space thus vacated at the market square was filled with the transfer of sales of hay from the Hietalahdentori market square.

The press made little mention of the event. Uusi Suometar published a six-row article: "The new market halls at the Hakaniemi market square were opened yesterday at 6 AM. Only a few merchants moved there yesterday. Sales of food and cloths continued at the market square." Shortly after the opening it was decided to equip every store at the market hall with electric lights up to 25 candlepower. The costs of acquiring the light and paying for its electricity fell onto the merchants. In the same year, foot pathways were made around the market hall.

During the first years, merchants at the market hall had to withstand the advance rent demanded by the monetary activity chamber, World War I and the Finnish Civil War. For the 1952 Summer Olympics in Helsinki, the market hall was fitted with a modern toilet. To acquire the necessary space for this, eight stores had to be removed and three officials had to be hired to administer the toilet. This caused complaints, as it would have been more economically viable to retain the stores at the site.

=== Basic reparations ===
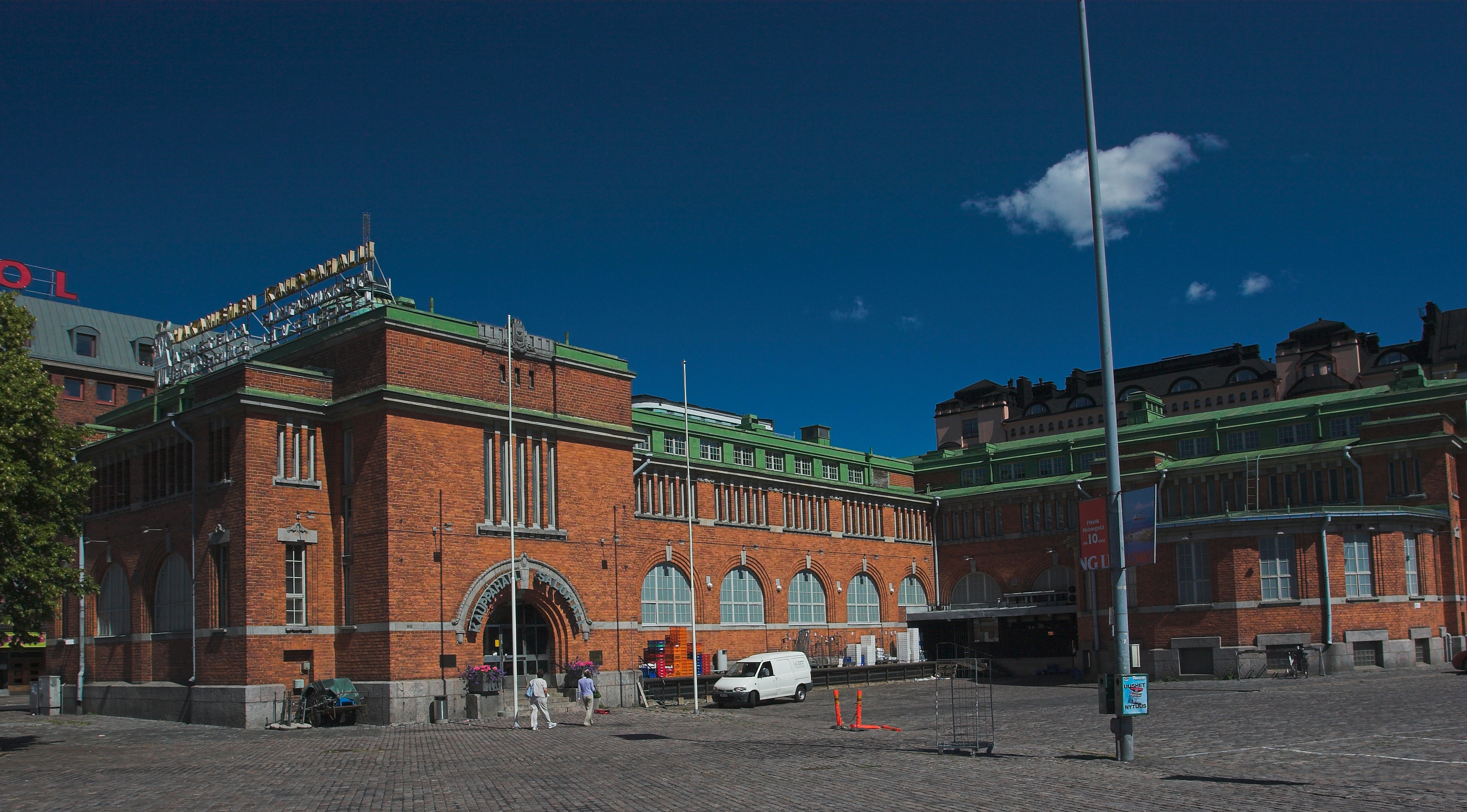
The market hall seen from the market square.

The market hall was first repaired in 1956, when it was closed for seven months. It was next repaired and renovated in 1971. This was supposed to take eight months but it ended up taking ten months. Many merchants were unemployed during the reparations and could only be re-employed when the market hall was opened on 1 December 1971. During the reparation, the air condition of the building was renovated and a set of escalators were installed between the two floors. At the same time, the rents for the stores at the market hall were doubled.

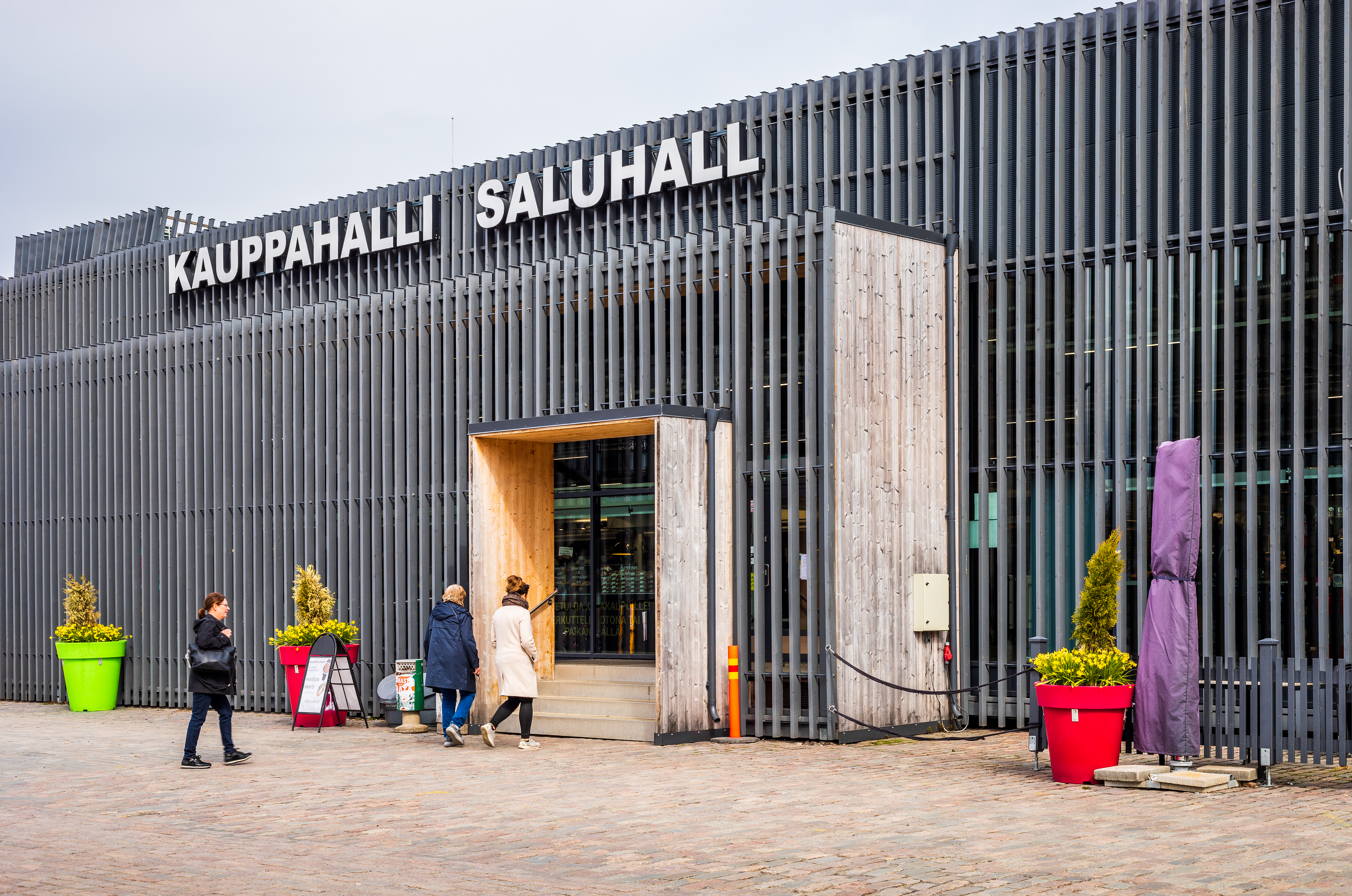
A glass pavilion was built in 2018 to serve as a temporary replacement for the Hakaniemi market hall when it was under repairs. The pavilion was received favourably by customers. The building was auctioned off to Vesa Keskinen in June 2023.

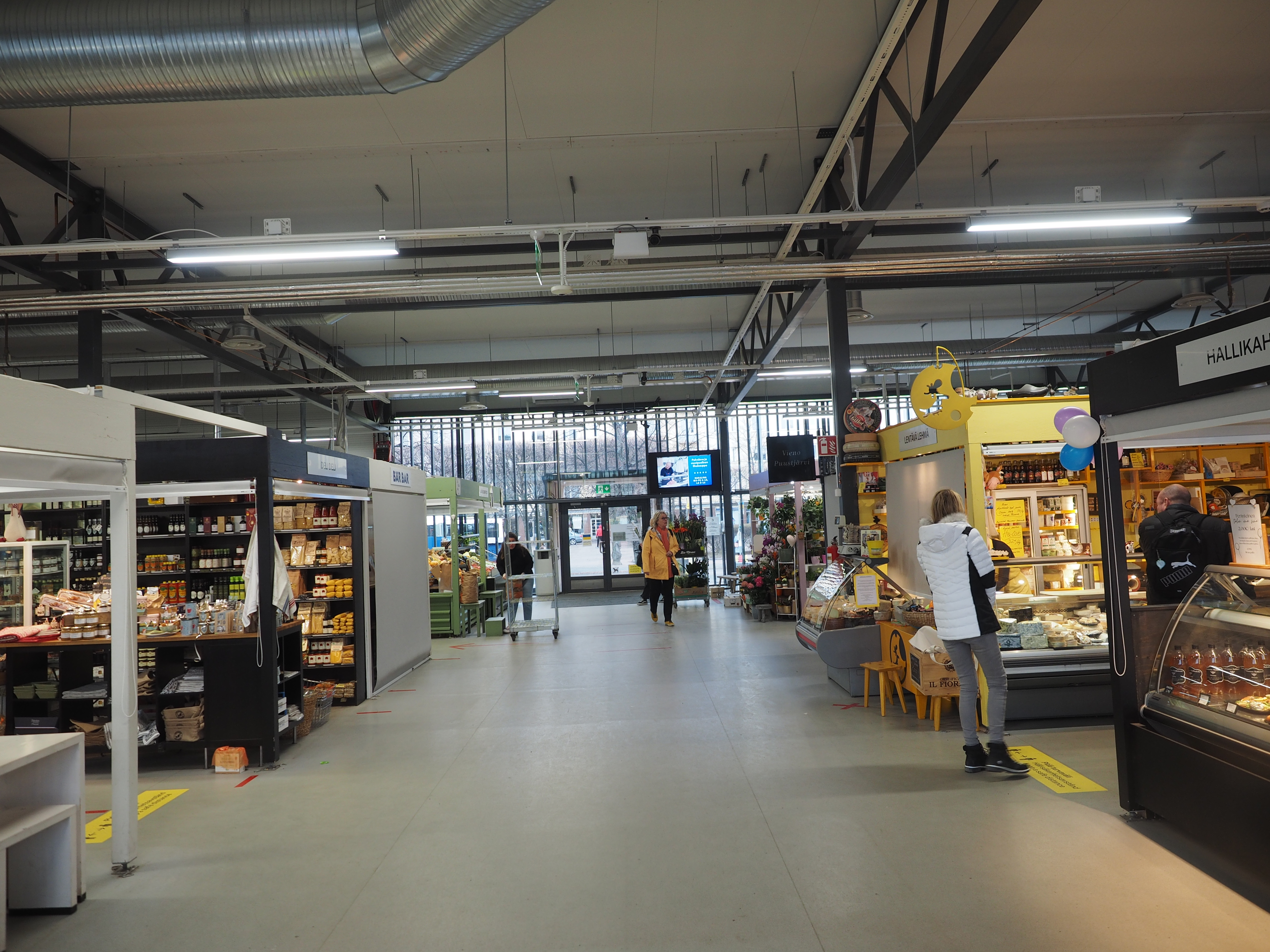
Interior of the temporary market hall.

The latest basic reparation started in 2018 was originally due to be finished in summer 2022. During the reparation the market sales continued at the heated temporary building next to the market hall. The market hall was closed on 5 January 2018, and sales at the temporary building started on 22 January. During the basic reparation, the interior of the market hall was renovated to its original state, the electricity and air conditioning systems were renovated and functional storage spaces were constructed. The old wooden support beams were also renovated. The renovation was originally supposed to be completed in late 2020, but it was delayed until summer 2022. The temporary building was originally scheduled to be dismantled in summer 2022. The basic reparation was originally supposed to cost 20 million euro, but the costs later rose to almost 40 million euro. In October 2022 it was announced that the repairs would continue to spring 2023.

The original Hakaniemi market hall was finally reopened on 27 April 2023. The temporary building was auctioned off to entrepreneur Vesa Keskinen for a sum of 440,000 euro. Keskinen announced he would relocate the building in front of his shopping centre Veljekset Keskinen to host events at the building.

== See also ==
- Old Market Hall, Helsinki

== Sources ==
- Jukka Parhiala: Katsaus Hakaniemen Kauppahallin 80-vuotis taipaleelta. Hakaniemen Kauppahalli Helsinki 1994.
- Kertomus Helsingin kaupungin kunnallishallinnosta. Vuodet 1907...1914.
