= Pitkäsilta =

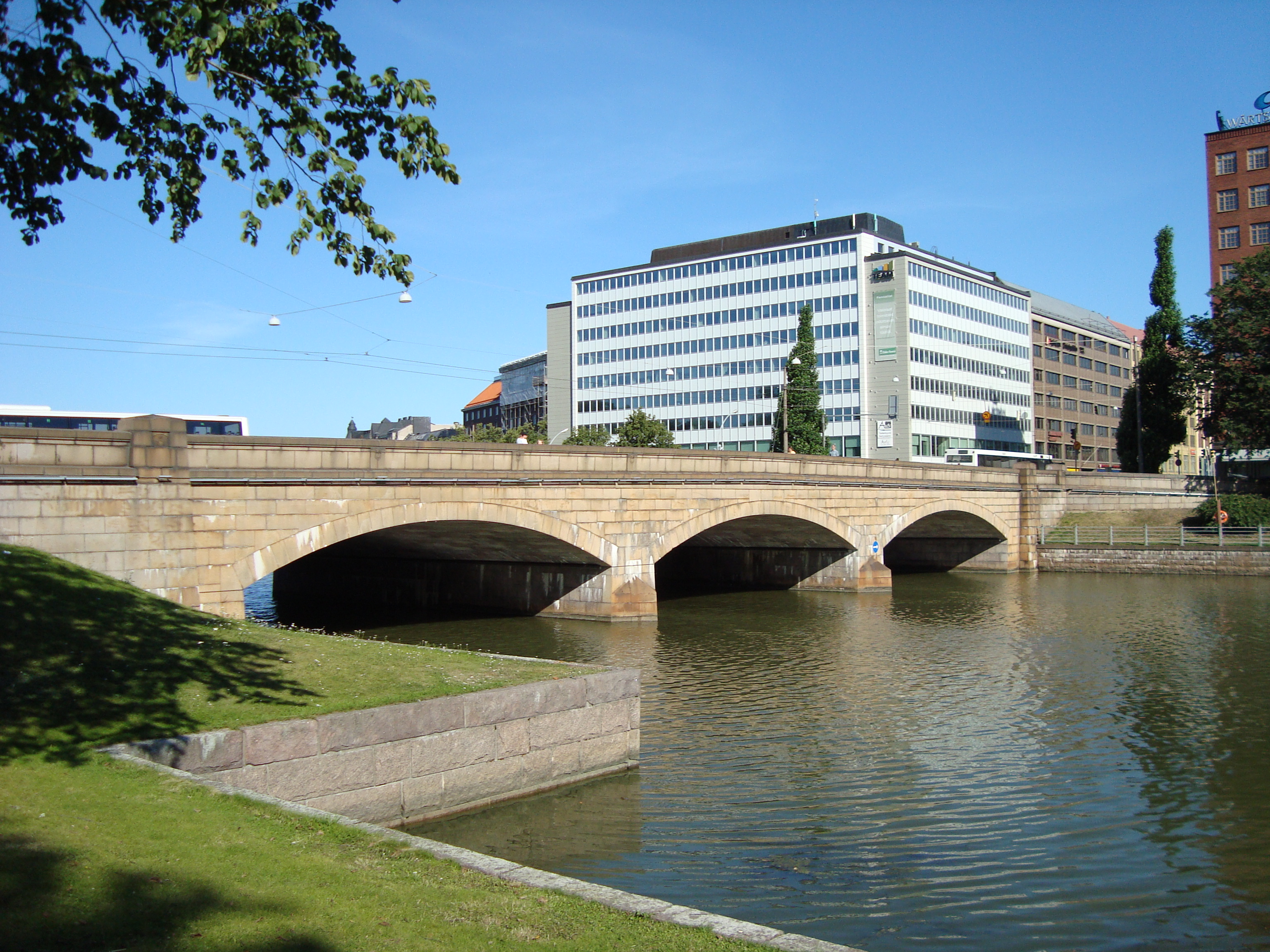
- Coordinates: 60°10′35″N 24°57′00″E
- Carries: cars, trams, bicycle, pedestrians
- Crosses: Kaisaniemi Bay
- Locale: Helsinki

Characteristics
- Design: Stone
- Total length: 75 m (246 ft)

History
- Opened: 1912

Location
- Interactive map of Pitkäsilta

The Pitkäsilta (Finnish: [ˈpitkæˌsiltɑ]; Swedish: Långa bron, lit. 'long bridge') is a bridge in Helsinki, Finland, connecting the districts of Kruununhaka and Siltasaari. It was completed in 1912 by the design of the architect Runar Eklund. Pitkäsilta is one of the best known landmarks of Helsinki. The bridge's name comes from near the end of the 19th century, when the district of Siltasaari was still an island. Two bridges led to the island, and bridge in the spot of the current Pitkäsilta was longer.

== History ==
The first wooden bridge across the Kaisaniemi Bay was opened 1651, followed by three other wooden ones until the present stone bridge was built in 1910–1912. Pitkäsilta was damaged in the 1918 Finnish Civil War Battle of Helsinki as well as in the air raids of World War II. Some of the marks are still visible.

== National symbolism ==
The Pitkäsilta connects Helsinki downtown to the once working-class districts of Siltasaari, Kallio and Hakaniemi. Most of the trade union and leftist party headquarters were also located around the northern end of the bridge. For several decades, the Pitkäsilta was considered as a divider and a symbol of the gap between the left and right. In the Finnish political jargon, the compromises between these factions are still sometimes referred as ″crossing the Pitkäsilta″ (Finnish: Pitkäsillan ylittäminen).
