= Hakaniemi Market Square =

Square in Helsinki, Finland

Coordinates: 60°10′44″N 24°57′04″E

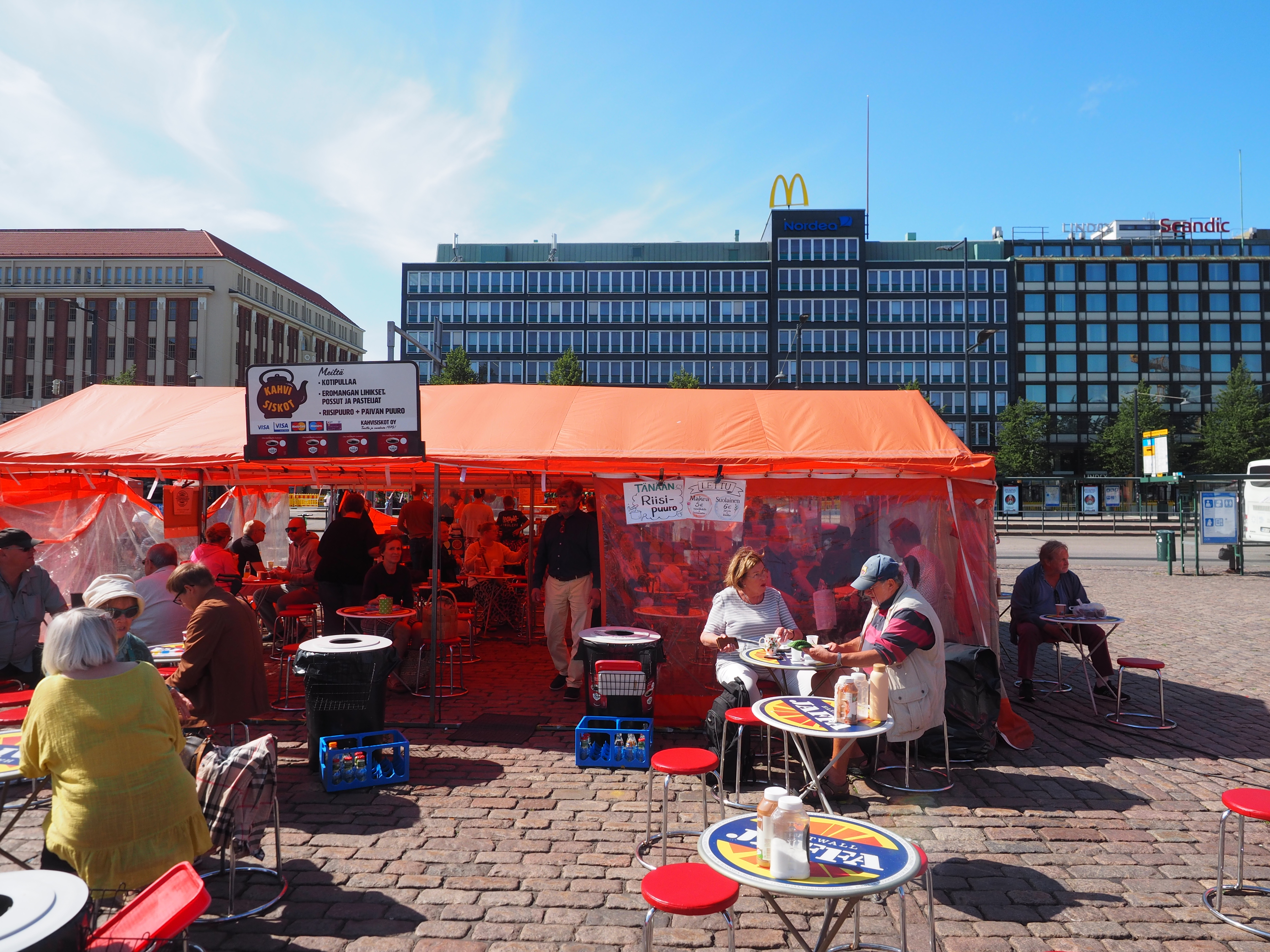
The Hakaniemi market square is a popular place to go for a coffee.

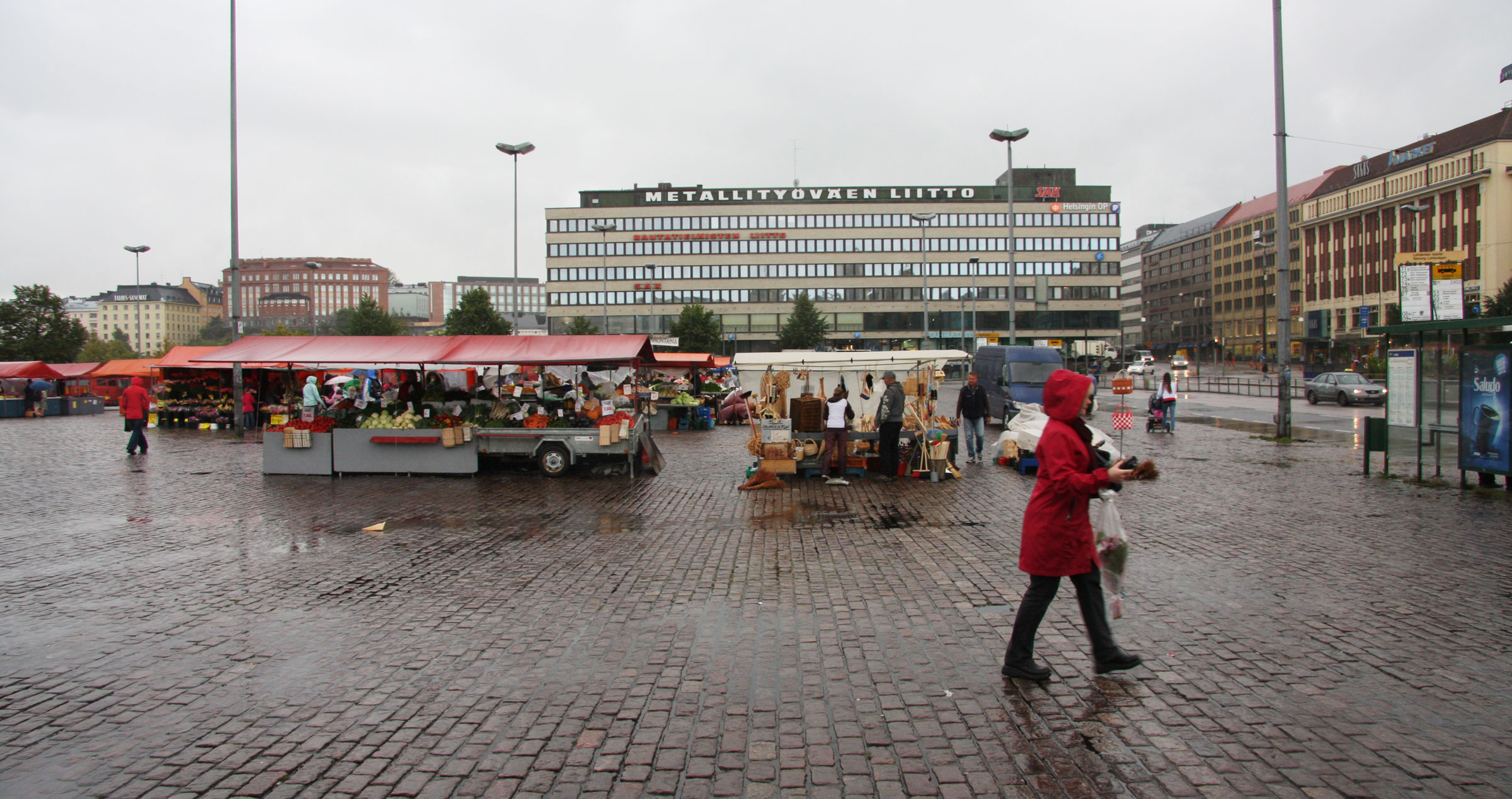
The Hakaniemi Market Square in 2008.

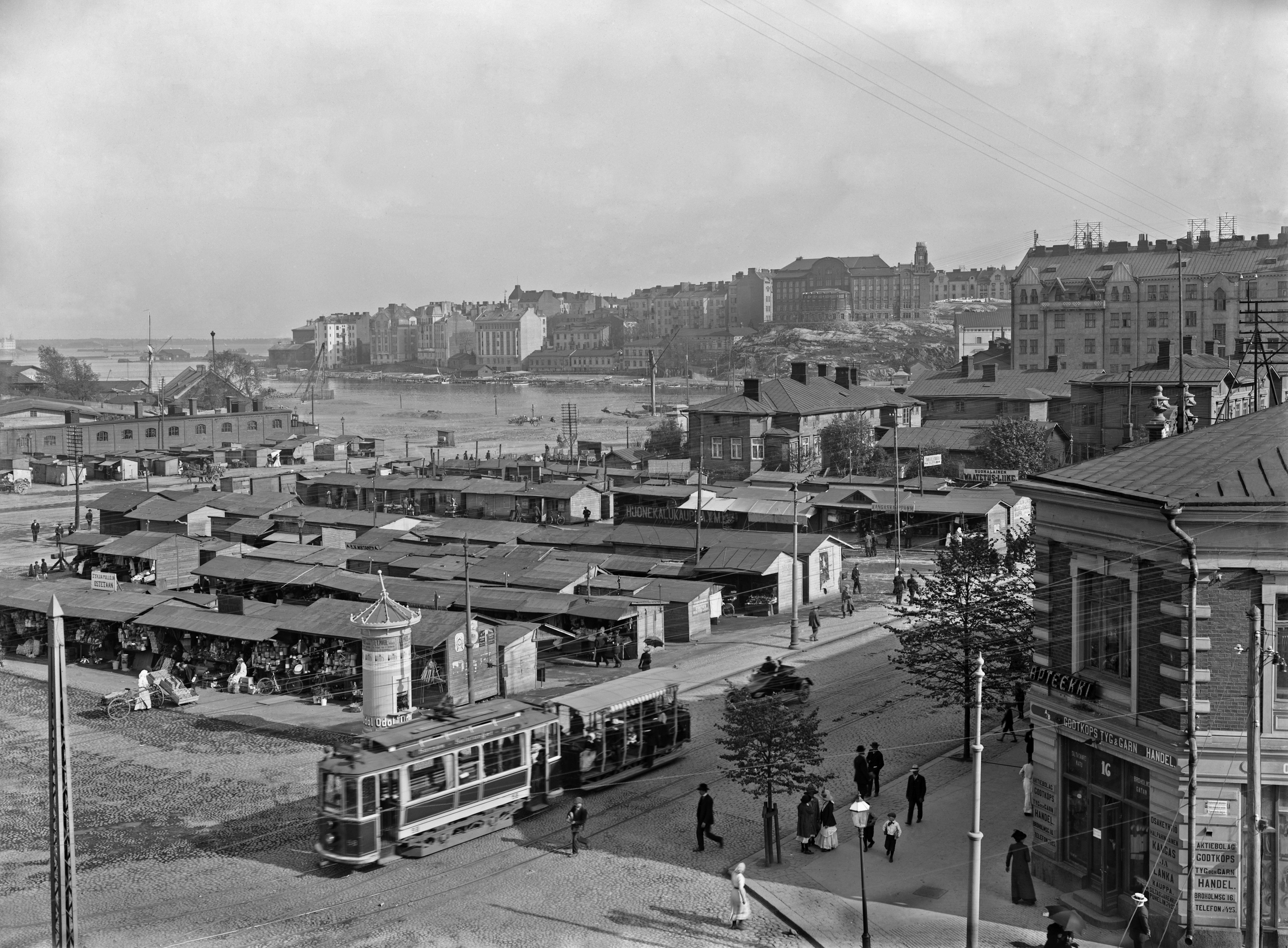
The Hakaniemi Market Square in 1913.

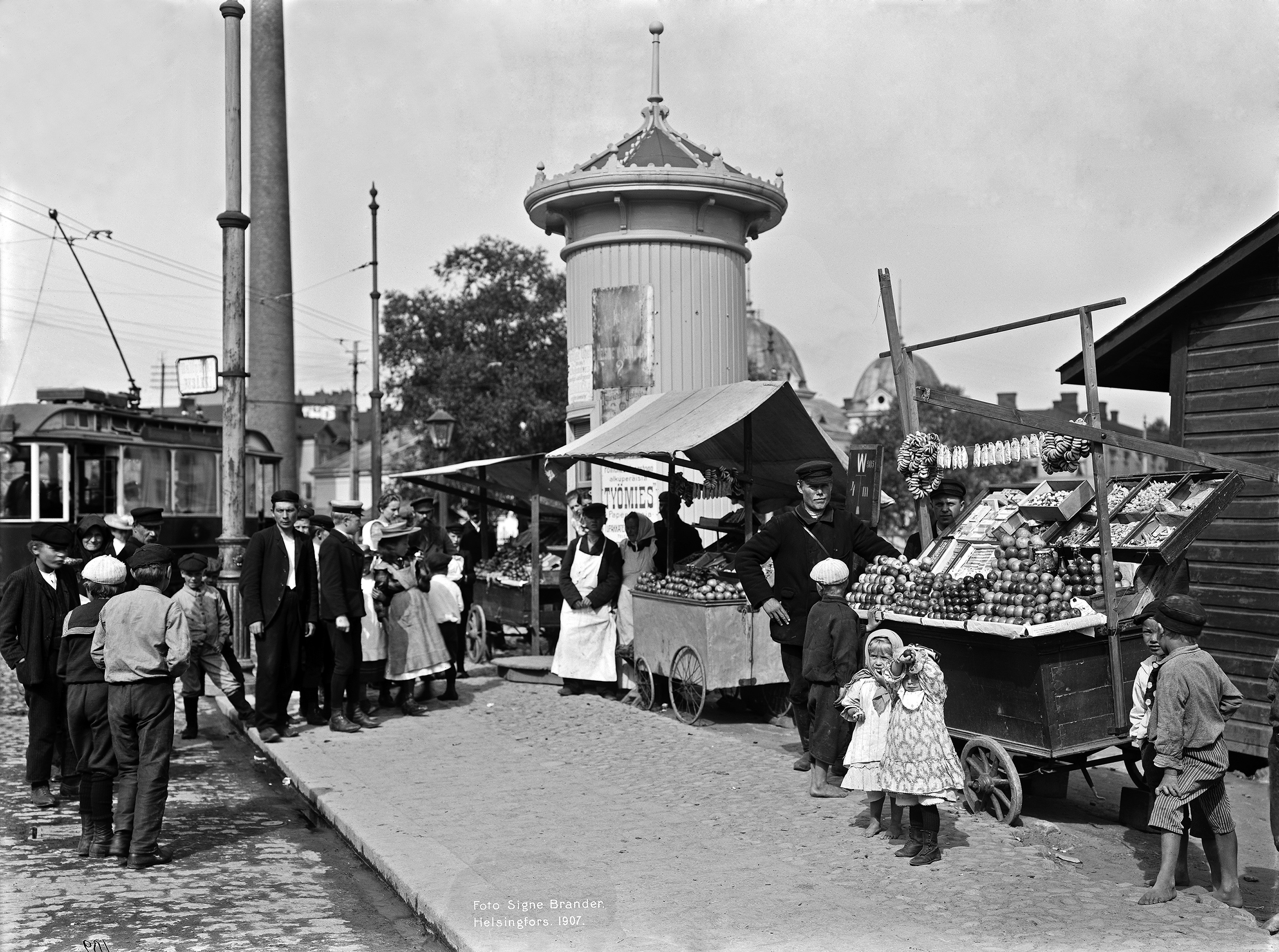
Russian fruit merchants at the Hakaniemi Market Square in 1907.

The Hakaniemi Market Square (Finnish: Hakaniementori, Swedish: Hagnäs torg) is a market square located in Hakaniemi, Helsinki, Finland, opened in 1897. Throughout its history, there have been numerous Vappu marches and demonstrations starting from the square, and it is an integral part of the history of the Finnish workers' movement. Many buildings near the square have been owned by Elanto and trade unions. The most famous buildings near the square are the circular Ympyrätalo office building and the Hakaniemi market hall. Opposite them, on the southern edge of the square, is the Metallitalo building.

The Hakaniemi Market Square was originally built on reclaimed land, located where there used to be a strait separating Siltasaari from the mainland. The square was founded to support all kinds of trade. The first merchants appeared on the square in time for Christmas 1897. All kinds of food from berries to game are sold on the square. The services on the square expanded in the early 20th century, when tailors and cloth sellers appeared on the square; fishmongers came in the 1920s. During World War II the square was full of stacks of firewood as the nearby houses needed warming. In 1979 the square was renovated and repaved with cobblestones.

The firewood stacks brought to the square were burned in a demonstration organised by the Finland–Soviet Union Peace and Friendship Society on 6 August 1940, which is known as "pinonpolttajaiset" ("the burning of the stacks").

There is trade going on at the market square on every weekday. It also hosts a fair on the first Sunday of every month.

A temporary glass pavilion was built at the square during the renovation of the Hakaniemi Market Hall for the market sellers, starting from 2017. The city council approved the plan in June 2016.

== See also ==
- Market Square, Helsinki
