= Planned tram projects in Helsinki =

Finnish proposed railway

The city of Helsinki and the neighbouring city of Vantaa have plans for a radical expansion of the Helsinki tram network within the 2020s and 2030s that would more than double the length of the network from 2021. If completed, the plans would both extend the current tram lines and build new light rail lines.

== Projects under construction ==
=== Vantaa light rail ===
The Vantaa city council approved the construction of a new 19.3 km (12.0 mi) light rail line from Mellunmäki to Helsinki Airport in May 2023. The line is projected to open in 2029 with an estimated daily ridership of 31,000. Construction began in June 2025.

=== West Helsinki light rail ===
The Helsinki city council approved the general plan for the West Helsinki trams (Finnish: Länsi-Helsingin raitiotiet) in January 2021, with an estimated total cost of €160 million. The project, previously known as the Vihdintie light rail (Finnish: Vihdintien pikaraitiotie), includes a 5 km (3.1 mi) light rail line via Vihdintie towards Kannelmäki, and new city center tram tracks via Topeliuksenkatu to relieve traffic from the crowded track on Mannerheimintie. The new light rail line from the city center to Kannelmäki is estimated to have a daily ridership of 40,000 by 2030. As of August 2023, construction was due to start in 2026.

== Line reorganisation ==
The Helsinki Regional Transport Authority is planning to re-organise the current lines as new light rail lines are being built.

In April 2022, the plan initially included small- to medium-length extensions, such as the works in Itä-Pasila and Jätkäsaari, and the extension to Laajasalo. Under this plan, the tram lines at the end of 2027 would be arranged as follows:

From	To	Line No.	Via
Eira	Käpylä	1	Bulevardi, Töölö, Helsinginkatu, Sörnäinen (M), Vallila
Olympia Terminal^{a}	Itä-Pasila	2	Kauppatori, Aleksanterinkatu, Töölö, Eläintarha, Pasila station
Olympia Terminal^{a}	Meilahti	3	Bulevardi, Central Railway Station, Kallio, Alppila, Eläintarha
Katajanokka	Munkkiniemi	4	Aleksanterinkatu, Mannerheimintie, Meilahti
Katajanokka Terminal	Central Railway Station (loop)	5	Aleksanterinkatu
Hernesaari	Arabianranta	6	Eiranranta, Bulevardi, Central Railway Station, Sörnäinen (M), Vallila
Jätkäsaari	Meilahden sairaala	7	West Harbour, Kamppi (M), Central Railway Station, Aleksanterinkatu, Kruununhaka, Sörnäinen (M), Vallila, Pasila station, Eläintarha
West Harbour	Arabianranta	8	Jätkäsaari, Ruoholahti (M), Töölö, Helsinginkatu, Sörnäinen (M), Vallila
West Harbour	Ilmala	9	Jätkäsaari, Kamppi (M), Central Railway Station, Kallio, Harju, Pasila station
Kirurgi	Pikku Huopalahti	10	Mannerheimintie, Meilahti, Ruskeasuo
Länsi-Pasila	Kruunuvuorenranta	11	Pasila station, Kalasatama, Nihti, Crown Bridges
Hakaniemi (M)	Yliskylä	12	Nihti, Crown Bridges, Kruunuvuorenranta
Nihti	Länsi-Pasila	13	Kalasatama (M), Kyläsaari, Vallilanlaakso, Pasila station

From roughly 2035, the lines would be arranged as follows:

From	To	Line No.	Frequency (tph)	Via
Katajanokka Terminal	Käpylä	1	6	Kruununhaka, Central Railway Station, Kamppi (M), Töölö, Helsinginkatu, Vallila
Eira	Messukeskus	2	8	Kamppi (M), Töölö, Taka-Töölö, Eläintarha, Pasila station
Kaivopuisto^{b}	Meilahti	3	6	Bulevardi, Central Railway Station, Kallio, Alppila, Eläintarha
Kirurgi	Munkkiniemi	4	8	Töölö, Taka-Töölö, Meilahti
Kauppatori	Pohjois-Pasila	5^{[c]}	6	Aleksanterinkatu, Mannerheimintie, Eläintarha, Pasila, Ilmala
Kolmikulma	Arabia	6	6	Central Railway Station, Sörnäinen (M), Vallila
Kaivopuisto^{b}	Meilahden sairaala	7	6	Kauppatori, Kruununhaka, Kallio, Sörnäinen (M), Vallila, Pasila station, Eläintarha
West Harbour	Arabianranta	8	6	Jätkäsaari, Ruoholahti (M), Töölö, Helsinginkatu, Sörnäinen (M), Vallila
Jätkäsaari	Ilmala	9	6	Jätkäsaari, Bulevardi, Central Railway Station, Kallio, Harju, Pasila station
Katajanokka	Pikku Huopalahti	10	8	Aleksanterinkatu, Mannerheimintie, Meilahti, Ruskeasuo
Kruunuvuorenranta	Länsi-Pasila	11	6	Crown Bridges, Nihti, Kalasatama (M), Hermanni, Pasila station
Central Railway Station, later from Jätkäsaari^{[d]}	Yliskylä	12	12 during weekday peak, otherwise 6	(West Harbour, Kamppi (M), Central Railway Station,^{[d]}) Hakaniemi (M), Nihti, Crown Bridges, Laajasalo
Central Railway Station (loop)	Länsi-Pasila	13	6	Aleksanterinkatu, Kruununhaka, Hakaniemi (M), Crown Bridges, Nihti, Kalasatama (M), Hermanni, Pasila station
Erottaja, later from Hernesaari^{[d]}	Kannelmäki	14	8	(Eiranranta, Bulevardi,^{[d]}) Mannerheimintie, Meilahti, Niemenmäki, Munkkivuori, Valimo, Lassila
Pasila station	Myllypuro (M)	15^{[a]}	8 during weekday peak, otherwise 6	Koskela, Viikinmäki, Latokartano
Central Railway Station	Helsinki-Malmi Airport, later Ylä-Malmi^{[d]} or Jakomäki^{[d]}	16	8 during weekday peak, otherwise 6	Sörnäinen (M), Vallila, Koskela, Viikinmäki, Latokartano, Tattariharju (Ala-Malmi, Malmi (Ylä-Malmi extension)^{[d]}) or (Suurmetsä, Vaarala (Jakomäki extension)^{[d]})
Central Railway Station	Pakila	17	8	Sörnäinen (M), Vallila, Käpylä, Metsälä, Maunula
Keilaniemi (M)	Itäkeskus (M)	550	12 during weekday peak, otherwise 6	Aalto University (M), Ring I, Laajalahti, Säteri, Leppävaara, Vermo, Pitäjänmäki, Etelä-Haaga, Pohjois-Haaga, Maunula, Oulunkylä, Viikki, Roihupelto
Mellunmäki (M)	Helsinki Airport	570	6	Länsimäki, Vaarala, Hakunila, Kuninkaala, Tikkurila station, Veromies, Virkamies, Aviapolis

- ^{a} Lines 2 and 3 do not turn around at their shared terminus at the Olympia Terminal: they only change their line numbers.
- ^{b} Lines 3 and 7 will not turn around at their shared terminus at Kaivopuisto: they will only change their line numbers.
- ^{c} This line and the tramways that comprise it are only tentatively proposed.
- ^{d} This extension and the tramways that comprise it are only tentatively proposed.

== Other possibilities ==
A construction of a light rail or tram system has also been proposed as a possible solution of arranging public transport in the Östersundom area annexed by Helsinki from Vantaa and Sipoo on 1 January 2009. An extension of the Helsinki Metro was originally planned as the main form of public transport for this area, but on 20 February 2009 a newspaper reported that a light rail system is being studied as an alternative to supplement or replace the Metro connection to this area due to the lower costs of a light rail link. If built, the light rail link could be extended as far east as Porvoo. As proposed in 2024, the new system would provide a transfer to Metro as well as current and planned light rail lines: Helsinki light rail line 15 in Itäkeskus, Vantaa light rail in Bredbacka, and the light-rail conversion of the bus route 560 ("Jokeri 2") in Fallbacka.

== See also ==
- Helsinki Metro
- Trams in Finland

== Bibliography ==
- Karjalainen, Marketta (2009-02-20). "Helsingin liitosalue saattaa jäädä kokonaan ilman metroa". Vantaan Sanomat (in Finnish). Archived from the original on 2011-07-20.
- "Pikaraitiotietä kaavaillaan Porvooseen asti" (in Finnish). YLE. 2009-06-25. Archived from the original on 2010-08-18.
