= Torkkelinmäki =

Coordinates: 60.186°N 24.956°E

Torkkelinmäki Torkelsbacken
- Helsinki Subdivision
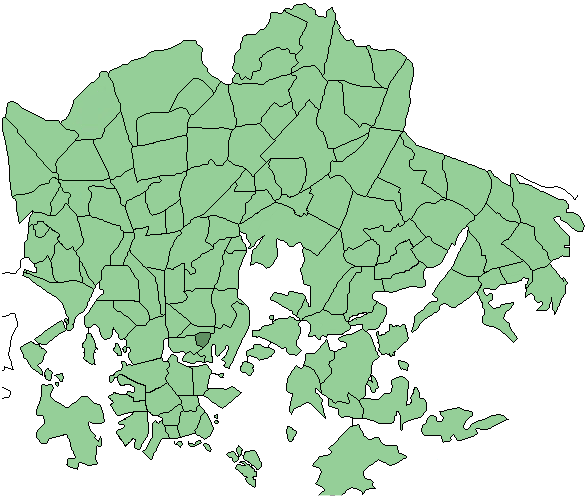
- Position of Torkkelinmäki within Helsinki
- Country: Finland
- Region: Uusimaa
- Sub-region: Greater Helsinki
- Municipality: Helsinki
- District: Central
- Area: 0.23 km^{2} (0.089 sq mi)
- Population: 7,172
  - Density: 31,183/km^{2} (80,760/sq mi)
- Postal codes: 00500, 00530
- Subdivision number: 113
- Neighbouring subdivisions: Sörnäinen, Linjat, Harju

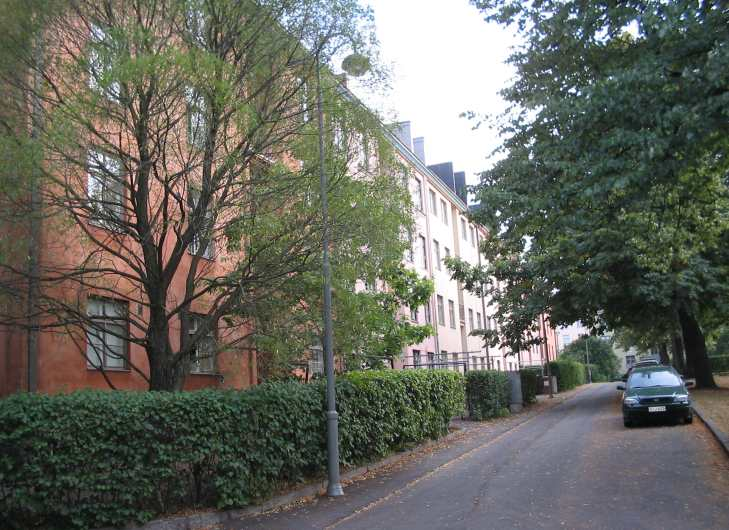
View from Torkkelinkuja

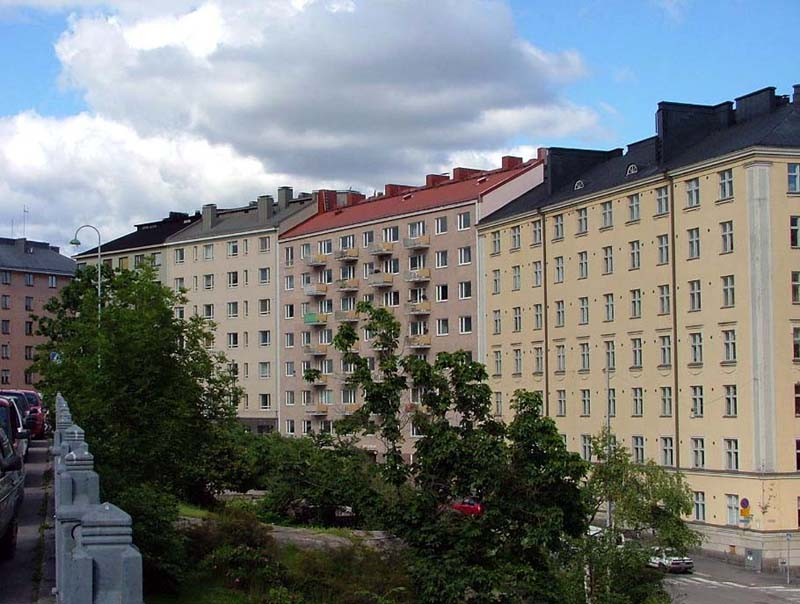
Pengerkatu

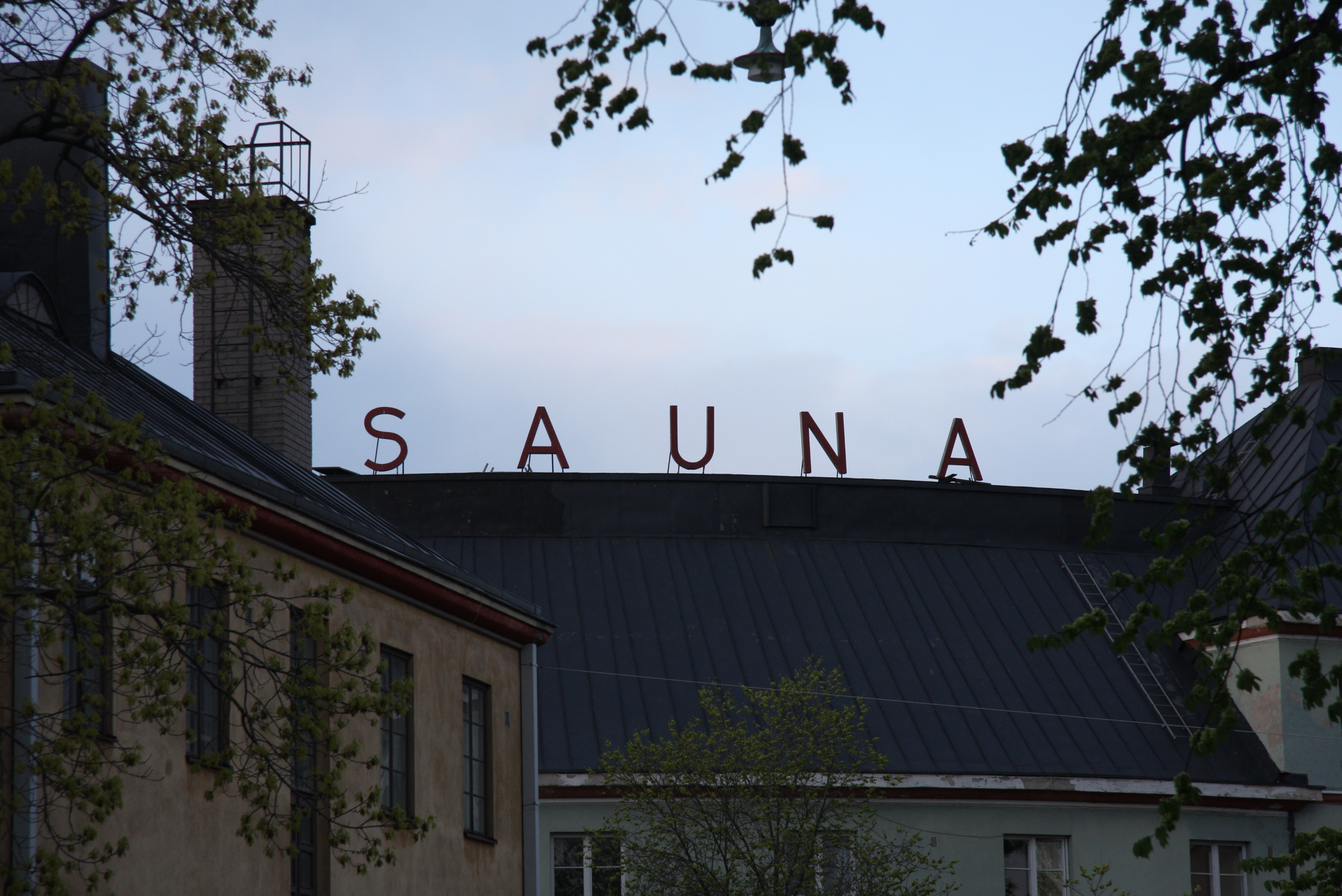
Kotiharjun sauna, traditional public sauna in Torkkelinmäki

Torkkelinmäki (Finnish), Torkelsbacken (Swedish) is a central neighborhood of Kallio, Helsinki, Finland. Its boundaries are Hämeentie on the east, Helsinginkatu on the north, Kaarlenkatu on the west and Viides linja on the south. Like elsewhere in Kallio, the area's apartments are small, mostly consisting of one or two rooms.

This small city quarter has more inhabitants than many small cities (7,172 as of 1 January 2015) and provides employment to 1,225 people (as of 31 December 2013). The population density - 31,183/km^{2} (80,764/sq mi) - is Finland's largest and comparable to Manhattan. The quarter's border streets, Hämeentie, Helsinginkatu and Kaarlenkatu are densely lined with tall apartment buildings. The neighbourhood offers good cafés and restaurants to residents and visitors.

The centre of Torkkelinmäki differs from the surrounding areas of the city; it is compact and picturesque. It was built in 1926-28 Nordic Classicism style with large gardens and parks, the streets are narrow and curved, and the buildings are usually in the centre of their lot.

Torkkelinmäki transport links are excellent most times of the day, though no public transit lines run through its streets. Sörnäinen metro station is in the northeast corner of the area and Hakaniemi in the opposite direction. Most bus lines going to northern and north-eastern parts of Helsinki and the capital region run along the eastern border street. Also, most Helsinki tram lines have their routes along the border streets of this neighbourhood. There are also Helsinki City Bikes stations at each of the four corners of the area.
