= Kalasatama Health Station =

Health center in Helsinki, Finland

Coordinates: 60°11′16.44″N 24°58′50.16″E

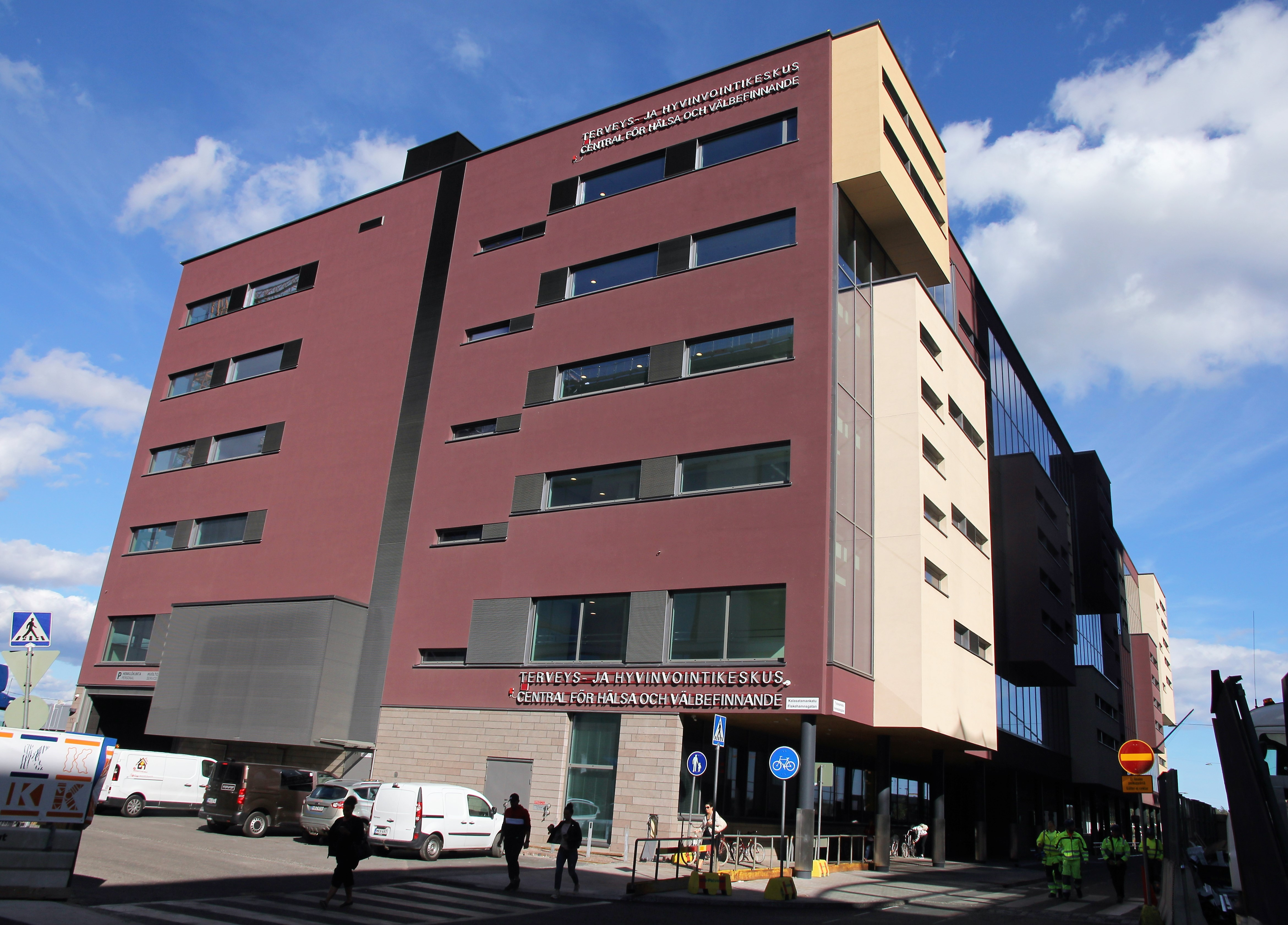
The Kalasatama Health Station

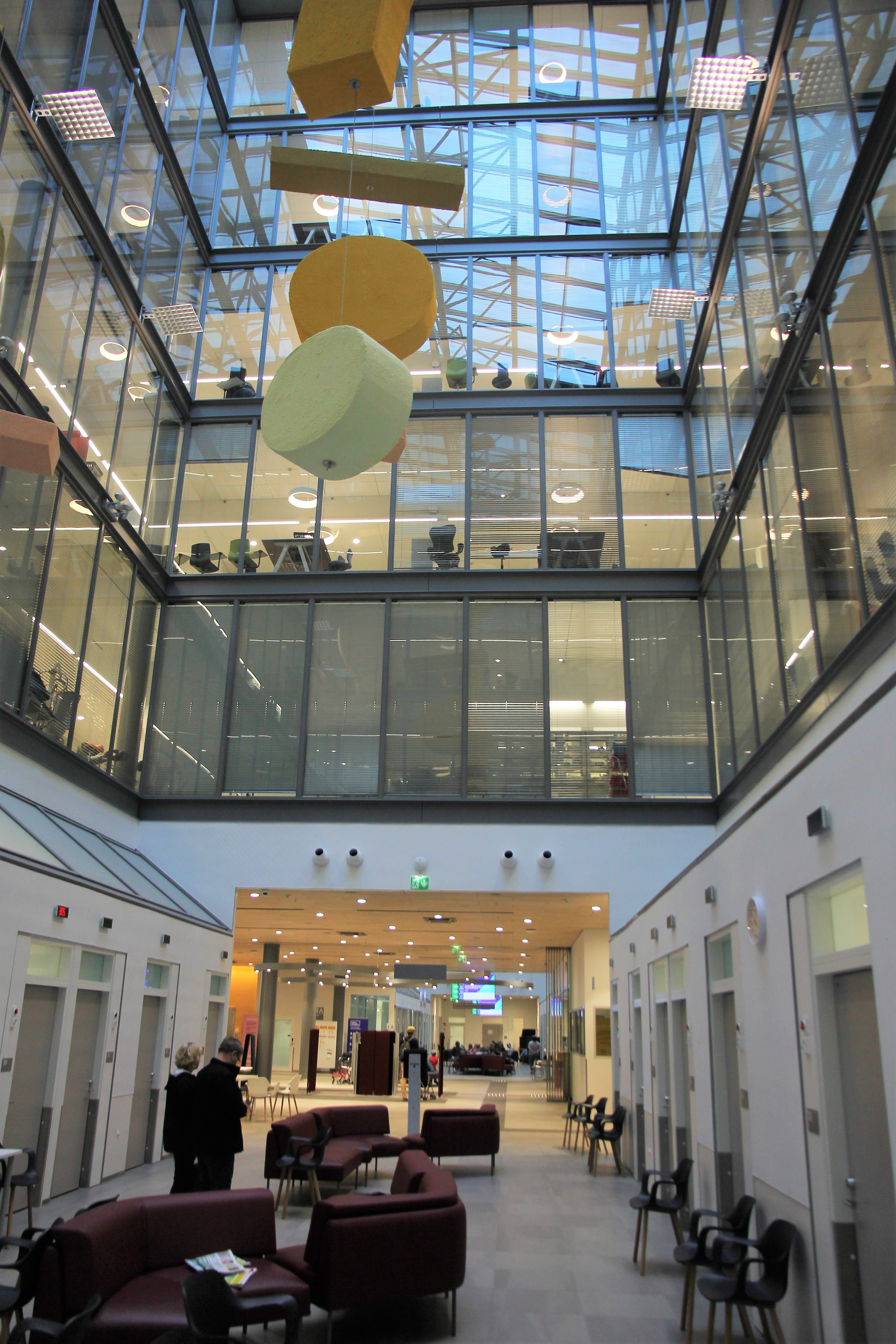
The lobby of the Kalasatama Health Station. Part of the eastern part of the sculpture Mobile E & W by Jenni Rope (2018) can be seen at the top of the picture.

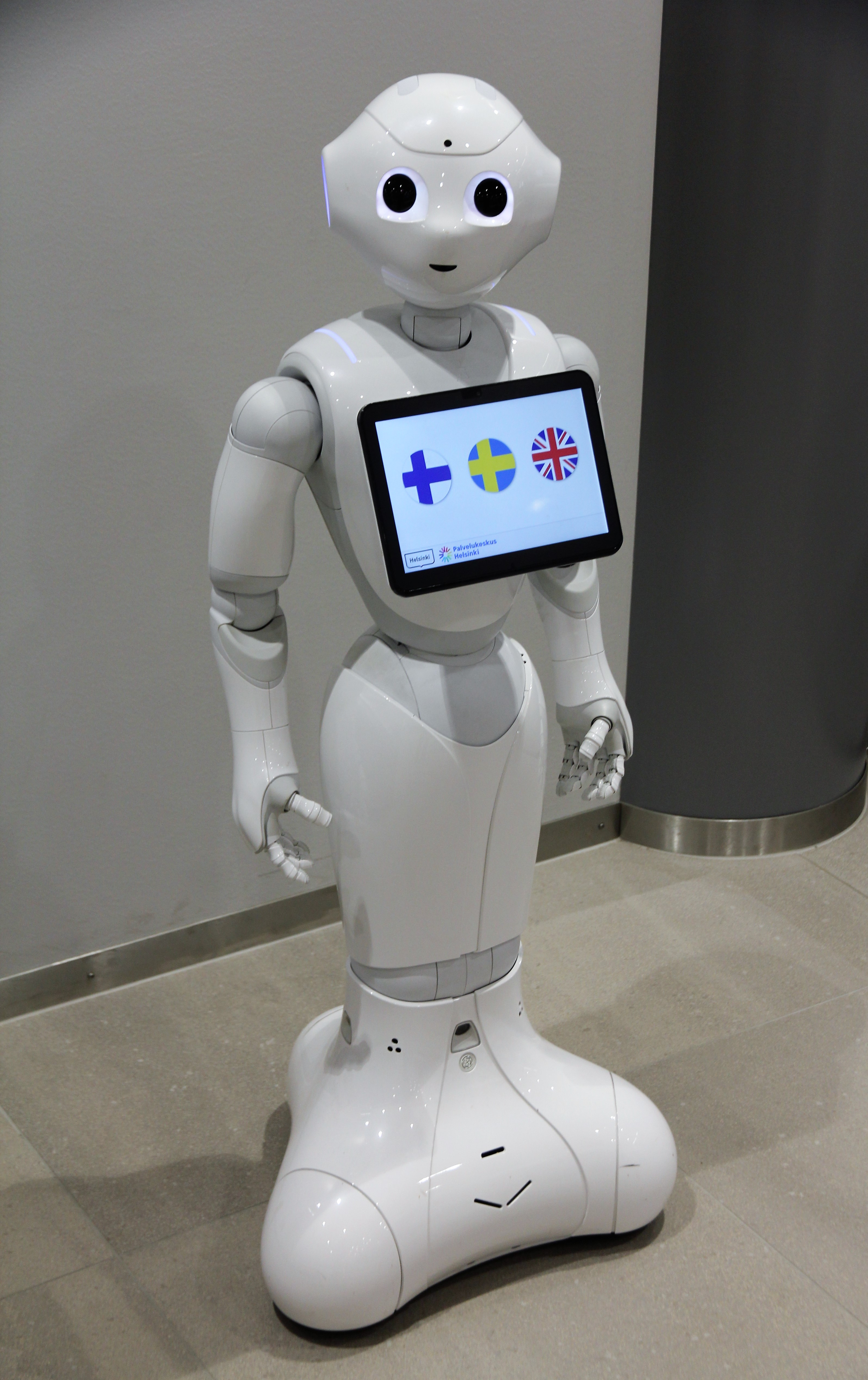
The talking service robot Pepper in the lobby, which starts talking when approached

The Kalasatama Health Station is a service centre for health and social services in the Kalasatama neighbourhood of the Sörnäinen district in Helsinki, Finland. It is located about 200 metres to the east-northeast of the Kalasatama metro station.

The Kalasatama Health Station started operations on 5 February 2018. The health stations in Herttoniemi, Kallio and Vallila closed down three days before this and their clients were directed to Kalasatama.

In its first months of operation, the Kalasatama Health Station received criticism about its transport connections, the design of its premises including the omission of an X-ray facility and lack of sunlight in its offices, the small amount of time doctors had for their clients, shortage of accessories in reception rooms and the way the Pepper service robot in the lobby kept talking to itself. The staff did not have reception rooms of their own, so some of the doctors had to move their principal tools into whichever office they had to use in a suitcase. Some changes have already been made to the activity of the health station based on the criticism and further action was sought for the problems during late 2018.

The sculpture Mobile E & W (2018) by artist Jenni Rope hangs from the ceiling of the lobby of the Kalasatama Health Station. The artwork is divided between two adjacent lobby rooms and is said to be the largest mobile sculpture in Finland.
