= Linjat =

Linjat Linjerna
- Helsinki Subdivision
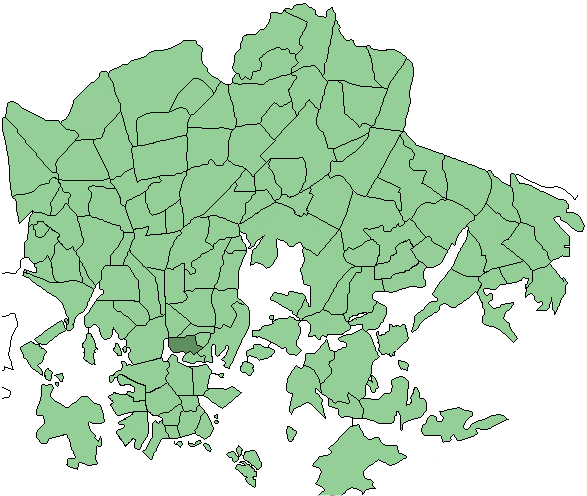
- Position of Linjat within Helsinki
- Coordinates: 60.184049°N 24.945108°E
- Country: Finland
- Region: Uusimaa
- Sub-region: Greater Helsinki
- Municipality: Helsinki
- District: Central
- Area: 0.61 km^{2} (0.24 sq mi)
- Population: 8,870
  - Density: 14,540/km^{2} (37,700/sq mi)
- Postal codes: 00500, 00530
- Subdivision number: 112
- Neighbouring subdivisions: Siltasaari, Kluuvi, Taka-Töölö, Alppila, Harju, Torkkelinmäki, Sörnäinen

Linjat (Finnish), Linjerna (Swedish) is a neighborhood of the Kallio district of Helsinki, Finland. Its name literally means "The Lines" and comes from the five parallel streets named 1st, 2nd, 3rd, 4th and 5th Line (Ensi, Toinen, Kolmas, Neljäs, and Viides linja (Finnish) / Första, Andra, Tredje, Fjärde, Femte linjen (Swedish)), which start at Hämeentie (Sw.: Tavastvägen) and run north-west, except for the much shorter Ensi linja, which starts at the southern end of Suonionkatu. The district lies to the north of Hakaniemi and Siltasaari and to the south of Alppiharju.

The boundaries of Linjat are the eastern shore of Töölönlähti Bay (west), Helsinginkatu (north), Kaarlenkatu and Viides linja, cutting Karhupuisto Park in half (east) and Hämeentie (from Viides linja to Toinen linja), Toinen linja and Porthaninrinne (south).

The area is served by the following public transport:

Metro Hakaniemi metro station's northern exit is at the junction of Porthaninkatu, Siltasaarenkatu and Toinen linja.

Tram Lines 3 and 9 run along Porthaninkatu, Viides linja and Kaarlenkatu, stopping at Kallion virastotalo (junction of Porthaninkatu and Toinen linja and Hakaniemi metro station northern exit), Karhupuisto (Viides linja) and Kaarlenkatu. In addition, lines 6 and 7 run along Hämeentie, stopping at Haapaniemi (corner of Viides linja). Also, tramlines 1 and 8 run along Helsinginkatu to the north of Linjat.

Tram stops Castreninkatu, Kuntatalo and Ensi linja are located at Ensi linja and Toinen linja. There is no regular traffic for them nowadays, but the tram tracks and the stops still exist. They can be used if the tram lines are on an exceptional route.

Bus Many routes leading to Vantaa, including the 615 to Helsinki-Vantaa Airport, run along Hämeentie, stopping at the Haapaniemi stop (from Helsinki: on the corner of Haapaniemenkatu; from airport: on the corner of Neljäs linja). Route 51 (Hakaniemi - Konala) runs along Porthaninkatu, stopping at Helsingin virastotalo tram stop, before continuing onto Fleminginkatu, Franzéninkatu and Kaarlenkatu. Routes 23 (Helsinki Central Railway Station - Ruskeasuo), 53 (Hakaniemi - Munkkiniemi) and 503 (Merihaka - Matinkylä (Espoo)) run along Toinen linja and Alppikatu, stopping at Kallion virastotalo, Castréninkatu (Toinen linja 25), Kuntatalo (Toinen linja 33), and Wallininkatu (Alppikatu 9).

Culture and education Kallio library is situated at Viides linja 11, just across the boundary in the Torkkelinmäki sub-district. Kallio Primary School (Kallion ala-aste) is at Neljäs linja 11–15. The Helsinki City Theatre (Helsingin kaupunginteatteri) is at Ensimmäinen linja 2.
