= Kallio =

Coordinates: 60°11′03″N 024°56′57″E

Kallio Berghäll
- Subdivision
- Position of Kallio within Helsinki
- Country: Finland
- Region: Uusimaa
- Sub-region: Greater Helsinki
- Municipality: Helsinki
- District: Central
- Subdivision regions: Linjat, Siltasaari, Torkkelinmäki
- Area: 1.09 km^{2} (0.42 sq mi)
- Population (2013): 27,051
  - Density: 16,494/km^{2} (42,720/sq mi)
- Postal codes: 00500, 00530
- Subdivision number: 11
- Neighbouring subdivisions: Sörnäinen, Linjat, Harju

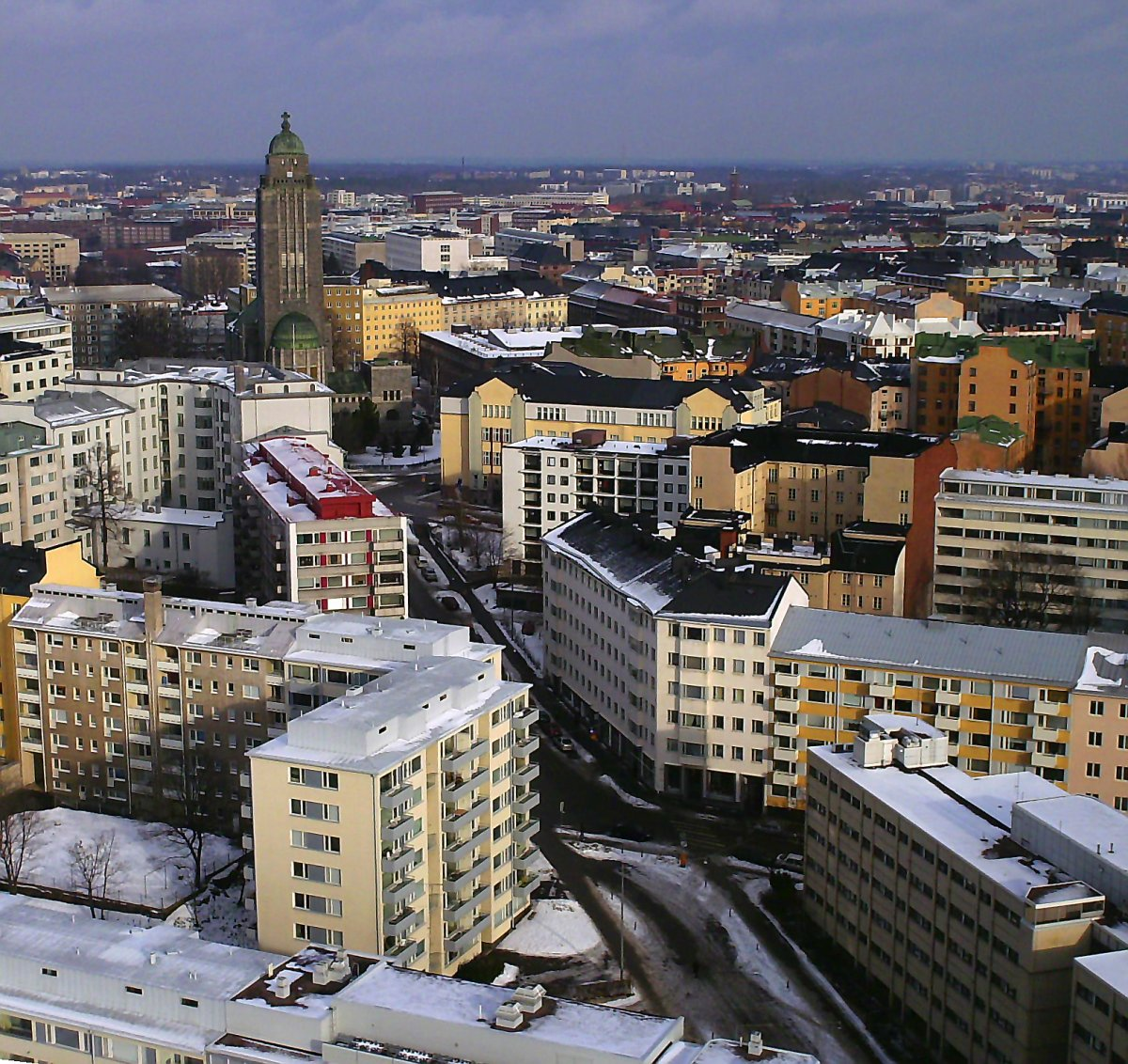
Aerial view of central Kallio

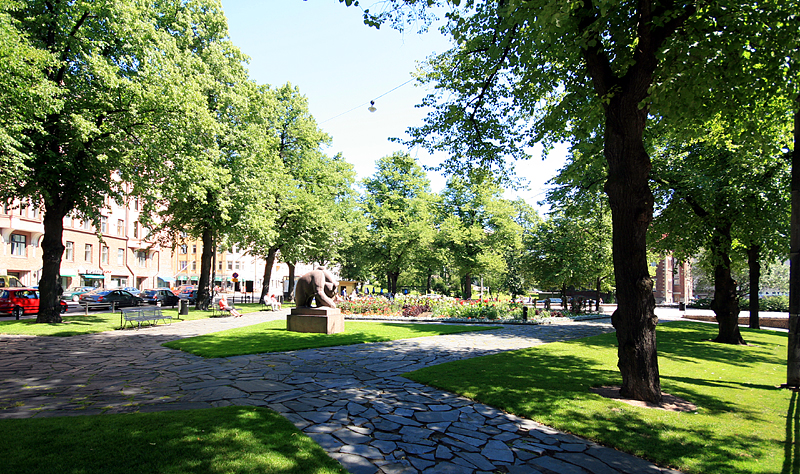
Karhupuisto

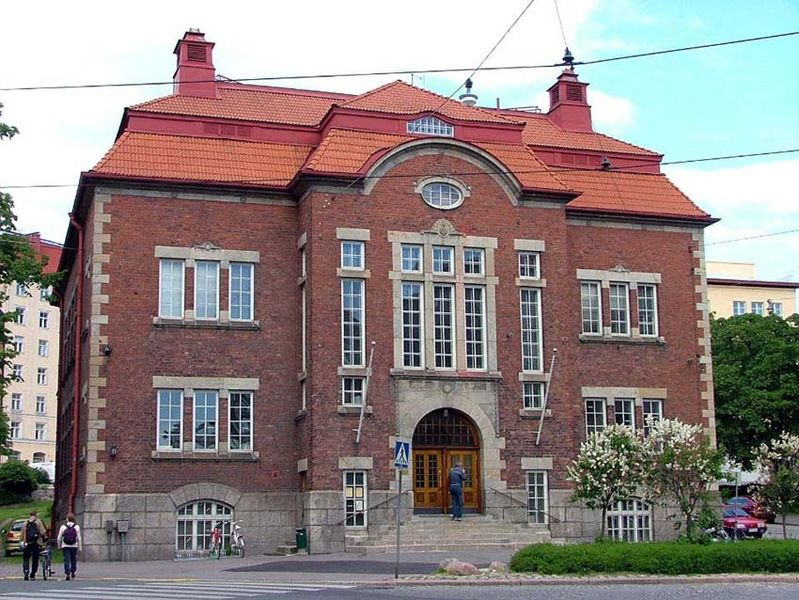
Kallio Library (1912)

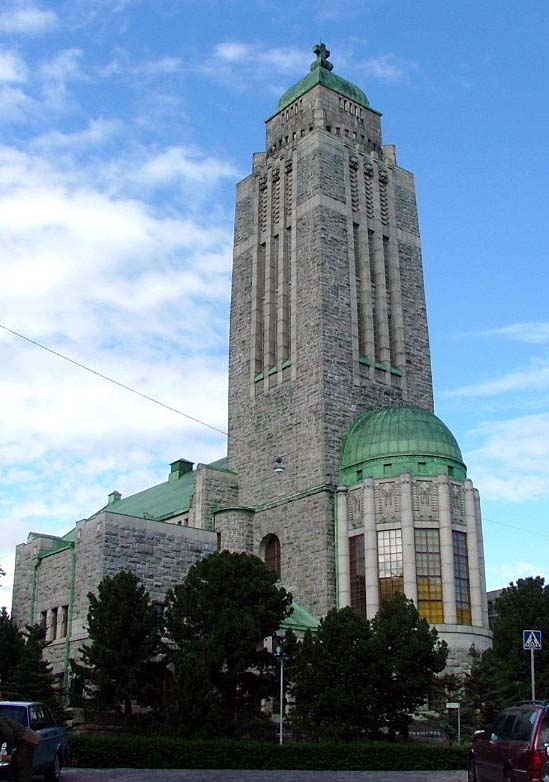
The Kallio Church, designed by Lars Sonck and built in 1908–1912, represents the Finnish national romantic school of architecture, as well as a change to Art Nouveau.

Kallio (Finnish: [ˈkɑlːio]; Swedish: Berghäll; literally "the rock") is a district and a neighbourhood in Helsinki, the capital of Finland, located on the eastern side of the Helsinki peninsula about one kilometre north from the city centre. It is one of the most densely populated areas in Finland. Kallio is separated from the city centre by the Siltasaarensalmi strait, over which is a bridge called Pitkäsilta ("long bridge"). Traditionally, the bridge symbolizes the divide between the affluent centre and the more working class areas around Kallio.

After the forming of the new centre in the 19th century, the city expanded northward. The intense industrialization which began in the 1860s in Helsinki saw the construction of the industrial areas around Sörnäinen harbour and to the workers' district of Kallio, with the area becoming inhabited mostly by factory workers. However, most of the working-class families have long ago been replaced as the most typical Kallio residents by young adults and elderly people living alone, in a process which could be seen as some sort of gentrification. For many people who move into Helsinki from elsewhere in Finland, Kallio is the area where they first settle. Most flats are small, and rents are typically lower than elsewhere in central Helsinki, partly explaining the area's popularity among students and artists. The small flat sizes also mean that Kallio is expected to resist full gentrification. However, the rents have increased as the district has grown more popular and become an increasingly desirable area to live in.

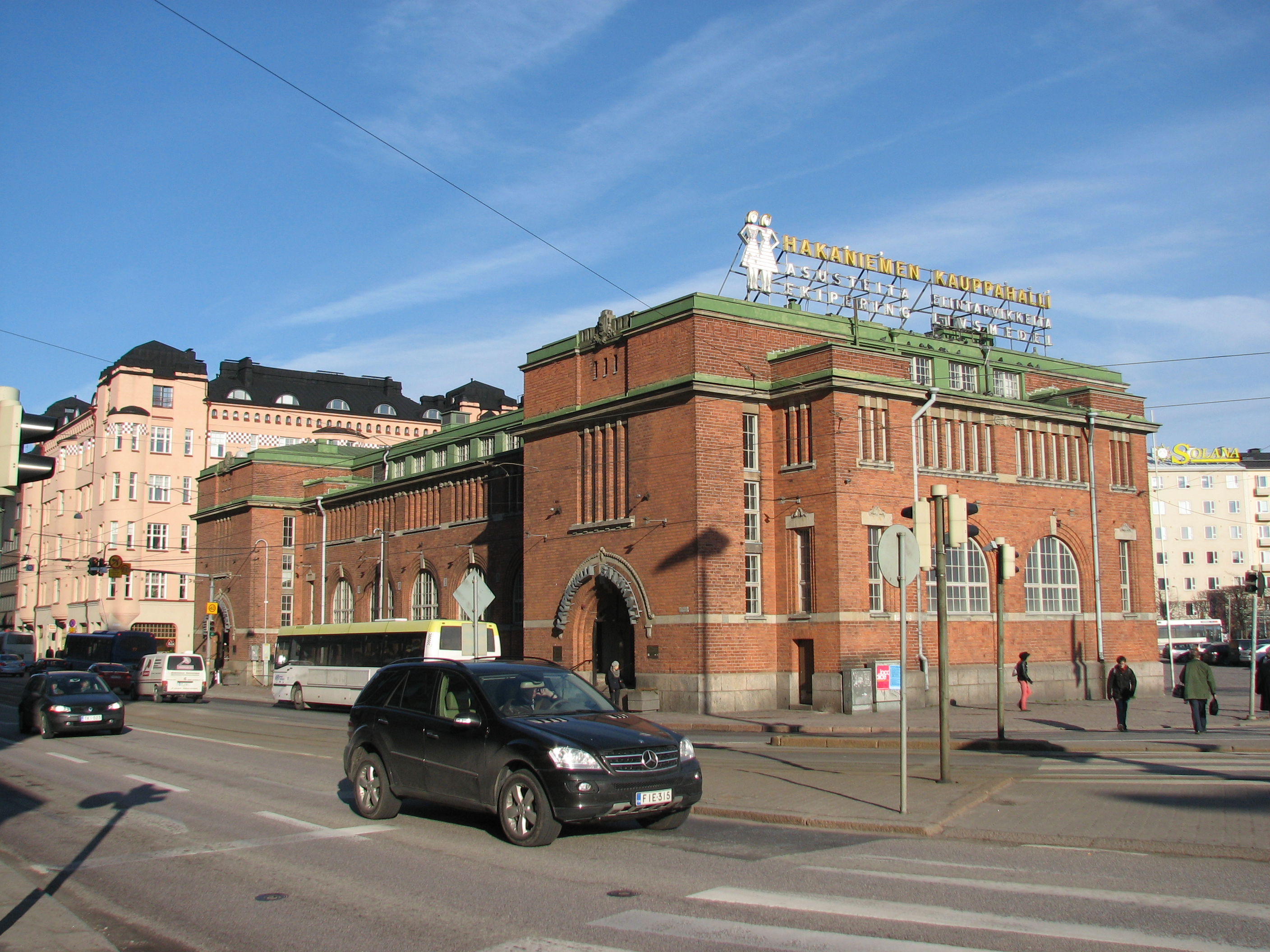
The Hakaniemi market hall (1914), is one of the three main market halls in Helsinki

Kallio (and Harju, which is often considered a part of Kallio) also has, more than any other district in Helsinki, a reputation as a "bohemian" and liberal area. The area has a heterogeneous population and many bars. The area also has a number of sex shops, strip clubs and massage parlors.

President Tarja Halonen was born in Kallio and lived there until she was elected president in 2000.

== Environment ==
Kallio was previously known as a working-class district. Up to the 1960s the small one- and two-bedroom apartments in the district were used by families with children, who moved away from Kallio as the wealth shifted elsewhere. Today Kallio has profiled itself as a district for students, young adults and artists. This has been caused by good availability of apartments, good selection of entertainment, central locality and good accessibility by public transport. The turnover rate of apartment tenants in Kallio is the highest in the entire city of Helsinki. The average time tenants live in Kallio is about three and a half years and only 29.3 percent of Kallio residents were born in Helsinki. Previously new tenants in Kallio were students needing their first place of their own or single people moving to Helsinki for work. Kallio has undergone gentrification during the last few decades.

== Services and transport ==
The apartments in Kallio are small, most have only one or two bedrooms. The population density, which is among the highest in the entire country in Finland, and the distribution of the population allows for a selection of local services that is among the best in Helsinki. There are brick and mortar shops and other services at the street level floor of almost every building. Kallio has good transport connections. The district has two Helsinki Metro stations (Hakaniemi and Sörnäinen), six tram lines and about 60 Helsinki internal and metropolitan bus lines. As well as this, the long-distance buses travelling on Lahdenväylä and Tuusulanväylä are accessible from Sturenkatu in Alppiharju, and the long-distance buses travelling on Itäväylä are accessible from Junatie in Vallila. Public services in Kallio include a library, a primary school, and a hospital belonging to the Helsinki Deaconess Institute. The area also includes the Metropolia University of Applied Sciences and two gymnasiums, the Kallio gymnasium specialising in articulacy and the Helsinki art gymnasium specialising in the arts. The Kallio Church is one of the most prominent landmarks in Helsinki. There are a lot of parks in Kallio, including the Tokoinranta park area along the Eläintarhanlahti shore as well as the Tarja Halonen park, Ilolanpuisto, Karhupuisto, the Matti Helenius park, Torkkelinpuistikko, Pengerpuisto, the Alli Trygg park, the Franzen park, the Harjutori park, the Deaconess park and the Tauno Palo park.

== The Kallio area ==
Kallio, known as a red working-class district, remains one of the most supportive areas of the Left Alliance to this day.

=== The district of Kallio ===
According to the division of the subdivisions of Helsinki, Kallio is bordered by the Siltavuorensalmi strait with the Pitkäsilta bridge crossing it and the Kaisaniemenlahti bay to the east, the Töölönlahti bay to the west, the street Helsinginkatu to the north, and the streets of Hämeentie and Näkinkuja as well as the Hakaniemi bridge to the east. The district is divided into three sub-districts: Siltasaari (about 2,400 inhabitants in early 2014), Linjat (about 9,700 inhabitants) and Torkkelinmäki (about 7,100 inhabitants). The Siltasaari sub-district contains the Hakaniemi market square with its environment. The name of the Linjat sub-district ("The Lines") comes from the five numbered streets in the area, Ensi Linja through Viides Linja ("First Line" through "Fifth Line"), but as well as the city blocks between them. the sub-district also contains the villa area of Linnunlaulu on the Töölönlahti shore, with a character completely different from the rest of Kallio.

=== The Kallio region ===
Together with the district of Sörnäinen to the east of Hämeentie, Kallio forms the Kallio region, also including the districts of Merihaka, Hanasaari and Sompasaari.

=== In colloquial speech ===
In colloquial speech, the name Kallio refers to an area larger than the official district of Kallio, which is thought to also contain the area of Harju in the district of Alppiharju near the Vaasankatu street and the Brahenkenttä sports field.

== Kallio in popular culture ==
Kallio has often appeared in Finnish popular culture. Kallio is the setting for Pirkko Saisio's 1975 debut novel Elämänmeno. The main character lives on Fleminginkatu and the events are mostly located in the border between Kallio and Sörnäinen. This gives the book "an air of a city block and district novel". Mikko Rimminen's 2004 novel Pussikaljaromaani takes entirely place in the streets and bars of Kallio. Ville Jankeri's film Sixpack (Finnish: Pussikaljaelokuva) based on the book was premiered on 2 September 2011. In the Juoppohullun päiväkirja books by Juha Vuorinen, the main character, Juha, lives in Kallio.

Kallio also appears in Finnish television series and films. The ideological significance of Kallio to the character of Helsinki stands out in Aki Kaurismäki's 1985 film Calamari Union where 15 people all named Frank go on a journey from Kallio to Eira in search of a better life. Kallio also serves as the background milieu for the Pekka ja Pätkä films featuring housekeeper Pikkarainen. The events in Tapio Piirainen's television series Raid are mostly located in Kallio, especially at Linjat. The main characters in the drama series Kotikatu moved during the 2004-2005 season from Ullanlinna to Kallio near the Karhupuisto park. Also the events in the television series Aikuiset are mostly located in Kallio.

In music Kallio is mentioned in many of the songs by Tuomari Nurmio, in the song Pois Kalliosta by Happoradio, in the songs Kalliossa and Tyttö huutaa hii! by Lapinlahden Linnut, in the song Kallioon by Plutonium 74, in the song Hagiksesta pohjoiseen by Juno and in the performance Kolmatta linjaa takaisin by Fredi. The song Kolmatta linjaa by Jontti & Shaka and many songs by Heikki Kuula also feature Kallio. Tuomari Nurmio's Helsinki slang song Tonnin stiflat features Kallio: "luudataan Hesarilla ja dallataan Hagikseen" ("we wander around on Helsinginkatu and then walk to Hakaniemi"). The lyrics of many songs by Sir Elwoodin Hiljaiset Värit feature Kallio, for example Flemarilla tuulee, Kaduilla Kallion and Ohut kosketus. The second verse of Kaija Koo's song Yhtä kaikki also features Kallio. The verse mentions the Karhupuisto park and the famous restaurant Cella in Kallio. Kallio is also mentioned in many songs by Laineen Kasperi and Julma-Henri. The 2009 song Kallioon! by Pertti Kurikan Nimipäivät represents the punk music style. Pelle Miljoona, another punk musician, mentions Kallio in his song Kallion kuu. The 2013 album Kallio by the jazz band Dalindeo contains twelve songs about Kallio. Vain hullut asuu Kallios ("Only crazy people live in Kallio") is the debut single by Vilma Alina. Despite the name, the lyrics of the song are about the street Vaasankatu in the district of Alppiharju.

== Street names ==
Five SE–NW streets of Kallio are named with Finnish ordinal numbers: Ensi linja, Toinen linja, Kolmas linja, Neljäs linja and Viides linja, meaning First Line, Second Line, Third Line, Fourth Line and Fifth Line, forming thus an example of numbered streets, rare in Europe and unique in Helsinki.

The SW–NE streets in the same area are named after Finnish scientists from the 18th and 19th century. Starting from South-east these include:

- Porthaninkatu, named after Henrik Gabriel Porthan, known as the Father of Finnish History.
- Suonionkatu, named after Julius Krohn, known by his pen name Suonio.
- Castréninkatu, named after Matthias Castrén, ethnologist and philologist.
- Wallininkatu, named after Georg August Wallin, orientalist and explorer.

To the east, the Torkkelinmäki area also has:

- Franzéninkatu, named after Frans Michael Franzén
- Agricolankatu, named after Mikael Agricola, Protestant reformer and the father of Finnish written language.

Many of the streets on both sides of Helsinginkatu in the Kallio and Harju are named after Swedish kings and lords of the 16th and 17th century

- Vaasankatu, named after the royal House of Vasa that ruled Sweden 1523-1654
- Kustaankatu, named after the first Vasa king Gustav I of Sweden, reign 1523-1560
- Kaarlenkatu, named after Charles IX of Sweden, reign 1604-1611
- Fleminginkatu, named after the Fleming family
- Sturenkatu, named after the Sture family
- Brahenkatu (eastern and western), named after the Brahe family

== Gallery ==
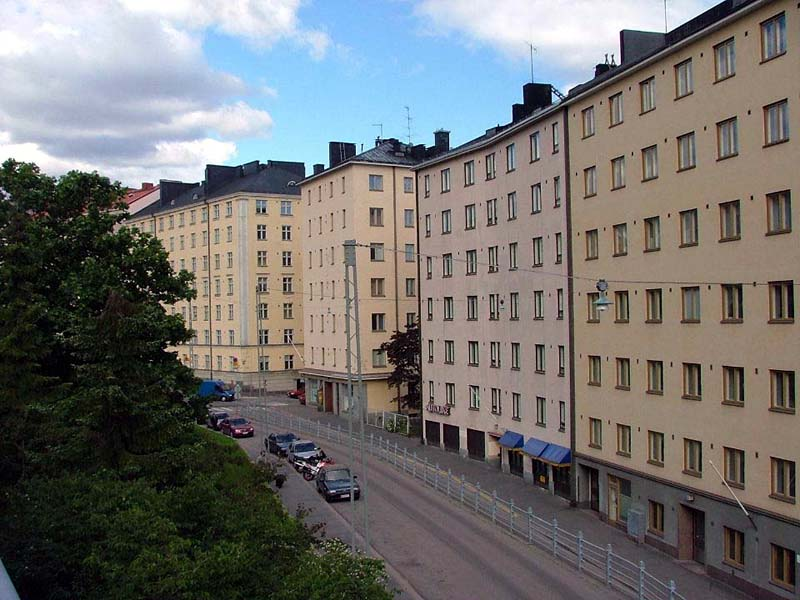
A view of the Pengerkatu street.

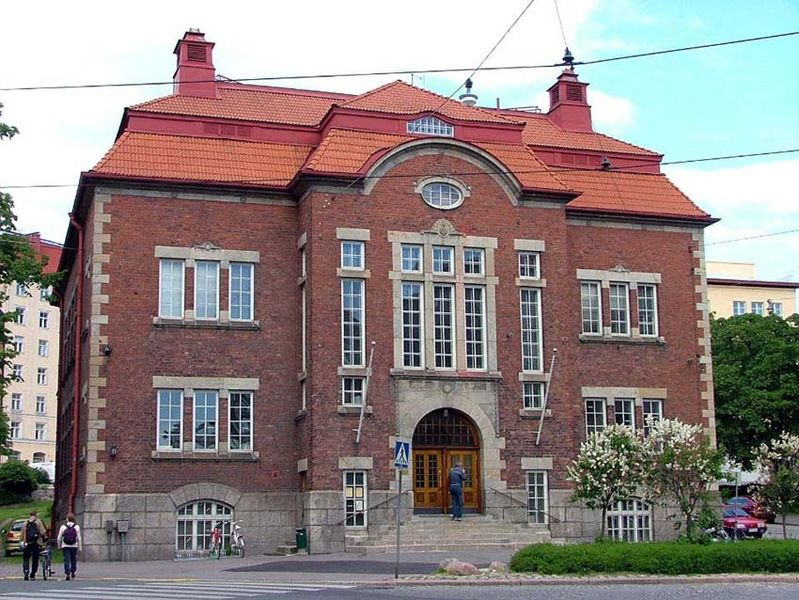
The Kallio library (1912) was the first library in Finland funded entirely by a municipal grant.

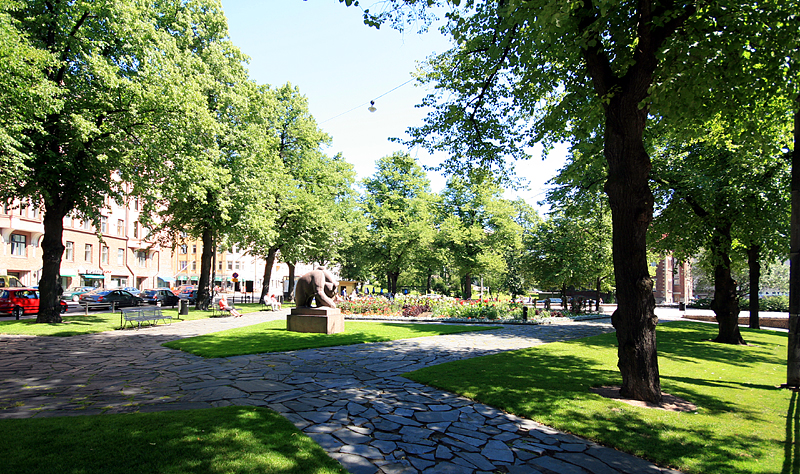
The Karhupuisto park.

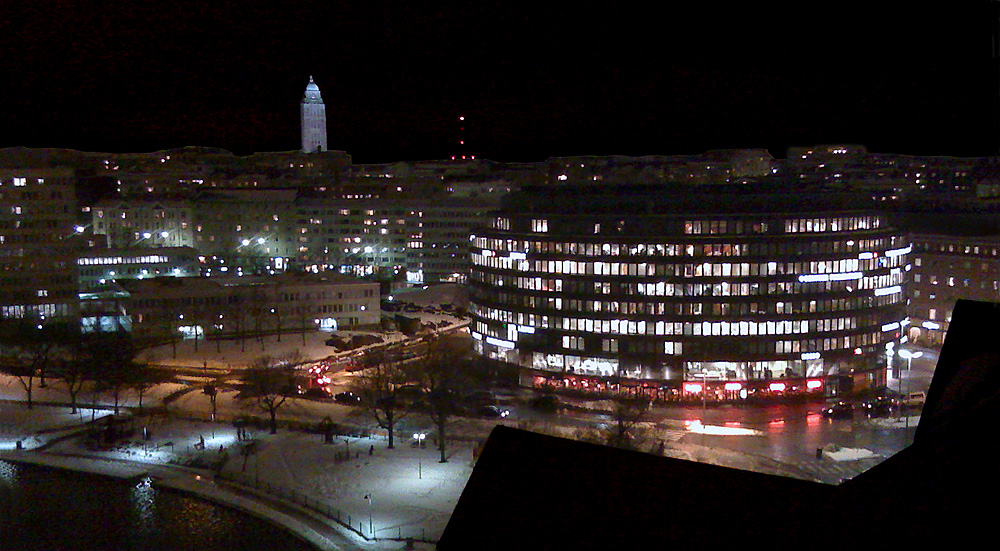
Kallio seen from the tower of the workers' house in Hakaniemi in January 2008.

Kotiharjun Sauna, the oldest public sauna of Helsinki

== See also ==
- Hakaniemi
- Sörnäinen
- Merihaka
- Vaasanpuistikko
