= Merihaka =

Residential area in Helsinki, Finland

Coordinates: 60°10′45″N 24°57′40″E

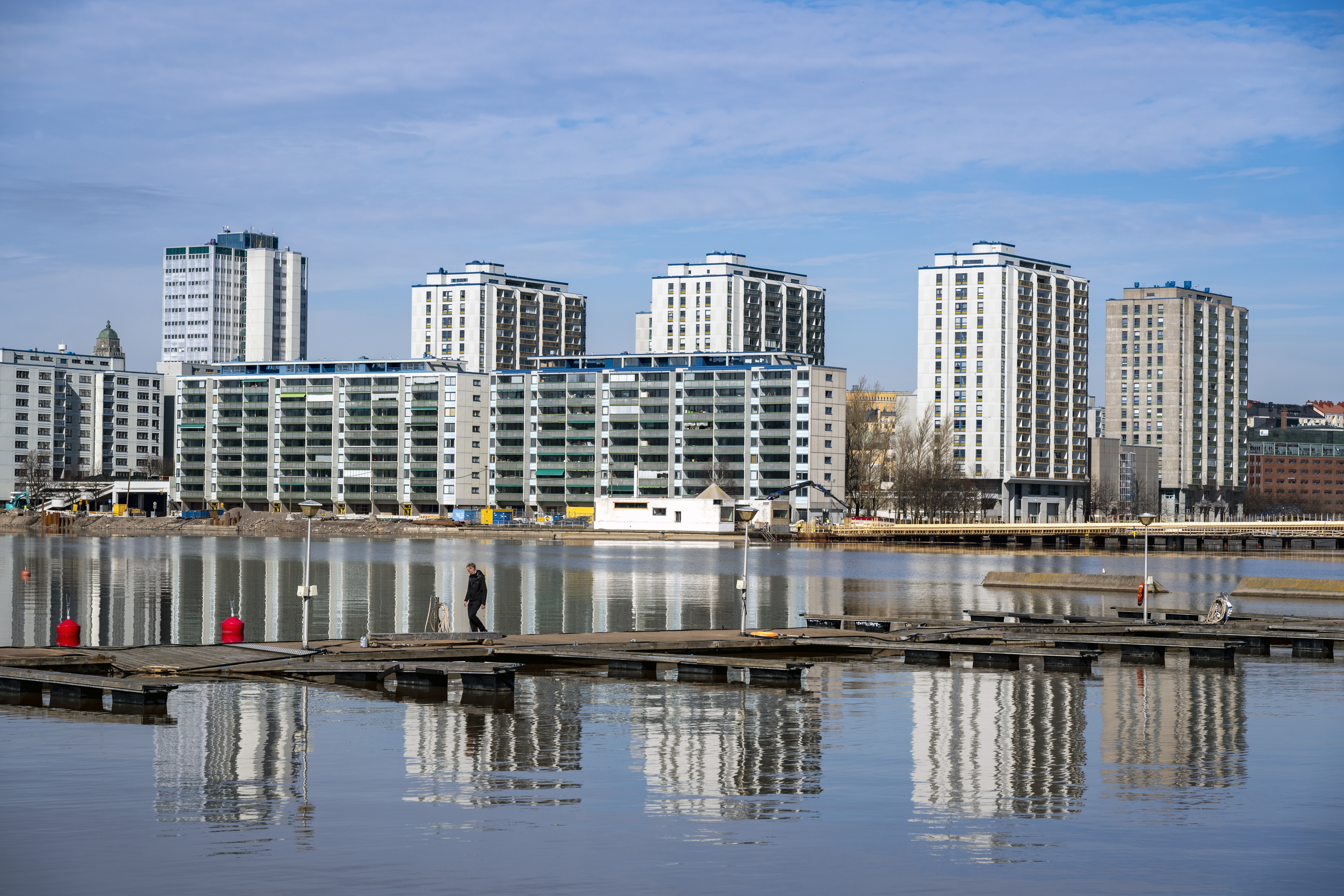
A view on Merihaka in April 2024

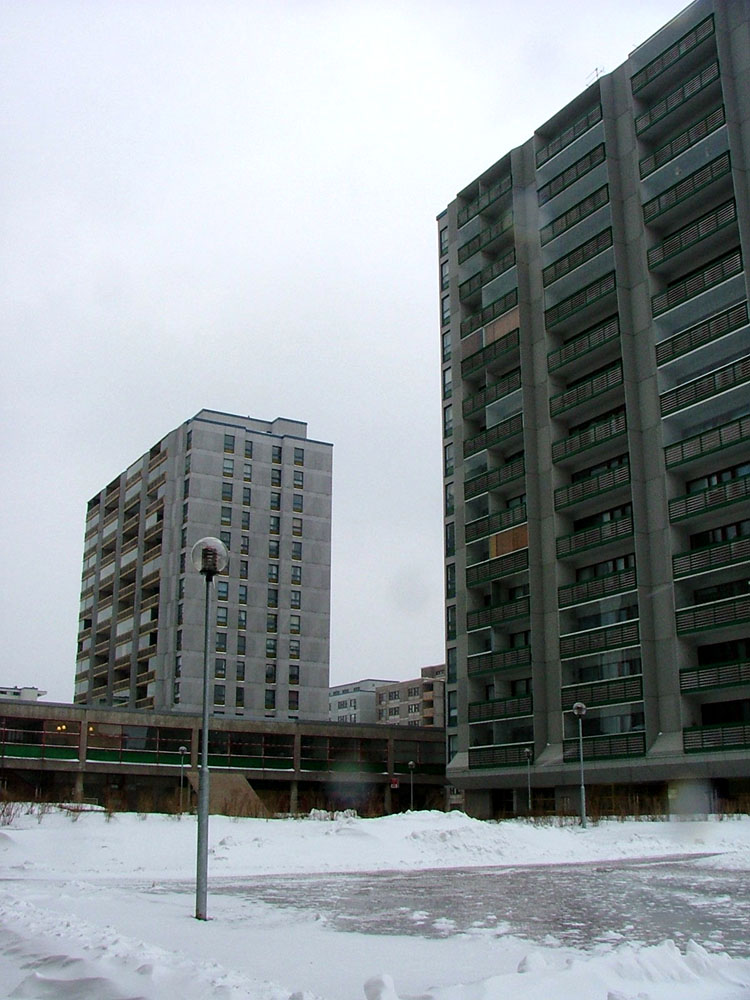
Apartment blocks in Merihaka during the winter

Merihaka (Swedish: Havshagen) is a coastal residential area in central Helsinki, Finland consisting of large high-rise concrete housing blocks. It is located by the Baltic Sea next to districts of Hakaniemi, Kallio and Sörnäinen. It is known for its tall, grey buildings. The residents of Merihaka tend to value highly the scenery, central location, tranquil atmosphere and lack of cars. The housing complex was built, partly on reclaimed land, during the 1970s and 1980s, and today it is home to some 2,300 people.

A distinctive feature, shared with some other places in Helsinki such as Itä-Pasila, is traffic segregation: the streets for cars and buses together with large car parks are on a level of their own, below that of pedestrian footways and the main entrances to the buildings. This arrangement was to increase the cosiness of the area as well as improve traffic safety.

The area has a central location, only about 1 kilometre (0.62 mi) from the core of downtown Helsinki. Some flats with sea views command very high prices. The attractiveness of Merihaka is increased by its small-boat harbour and many residents are members of the local yacht club. Public transportation possibilities are diverse and rapid.

Former residents Merihaka include the former prime minister of Finland, Kalevi Sorsa.
