= Harju, Helsinki =

Quarter of Helsinki, Finland

Coordinates: 60.188327°N 24.953095°E

Location of Harju within Helsinki

Harju (Swedish: Ås) is a quarter of Helsinki, Finland. It is located northeast of the city centre, part of Alppiharju neighbourhood, between the quarters of Alppila, Torkkelinmäki, Linjat and the neighbourhoods of Sörnäinen and Vallila. Harju has a population of 7,237 (as of 1 January 2005) and an area of 0.27 km^{2}.

Harju has the highest population density per km^{2} in Finland, along with the neighboring Torkkelinmäki quarter. Apartments in Harju are usually very small, single-person flats. Harju also contains dozens of pubs, fast-food restaurants and Thai massage parlors, despite its very small size by area.
