= Hermanni (Helsinki) =

Coordinates: 60°12′N 24°59′E

Hermanni Hermanstad
- Helsinki Subdivision
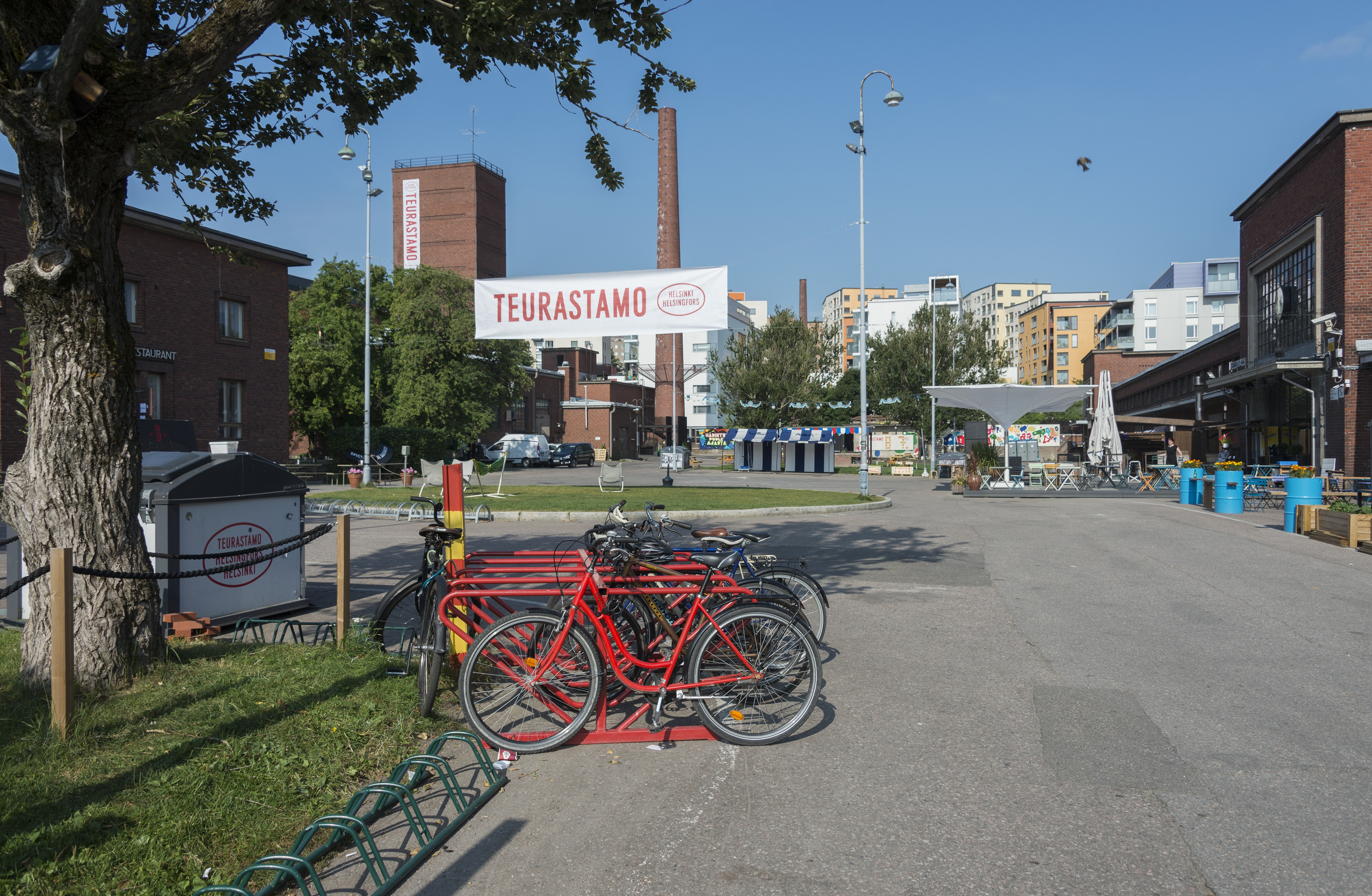
- The restaurant area Teurastamo in Hermanni

- Position of Hermanni within Helsinki
- Country: Finland
- Region: Uusimaa
- Sub-region: Greater Helsinki
- Municipality: Helsinki
- District: Central
- Subdivision regions: is a quarter of the Vallila neighbourhood
- Area: 105 km^{2} (41 sq mi)
- Population (1.1.2012): 5 124
  - Density: 4/km^{2} (10/sq mi)
- Postal codes: 00550, 00580
- Subdivision number: 21
- Neighbouring subdivisions: Sörnäinen; Alppiharju; Arabianranta; Toukola; Kumpula

Hermanni ([ˈhermɑnːi]; Swedish: Hermanstad, Finland Swedish: [ˈhermɑnˌstɑːd]) is a neighbourhood in Central major district of Helsinki, Finland. As of 2012, Hermanni has 5,124 inhabitants living in an area of 1.05 km^{2}. Hermanni is part of Vallila district.

Hermanni's well-known areas include Teurastamo, known as a popular food and city culture hub, which once housed the city's historic slaughterhouse from 1933 to 1992.

Helsinki Prison is located on the district. It opened in 1881 and is the only prison operating in Helsinki proper.

== Politics ==
Results of the 2011 Finnish parliamentary election in Hermanni:

- Green League 19.8%
- Left Alliance 19.8%
- Social Democratic Party 19.3%
- National Coalition Party 16.9%
- True Finns 12.7%
- Centre Party 3.3%
- Swedish People's Party 3.3%
- Christian Democrats 1.9%
