= Alppiharju =

Coordinates: 60°11′18″N 24°56′43″E

Alppiharju Åshöjden
- Helsinki Subdivision
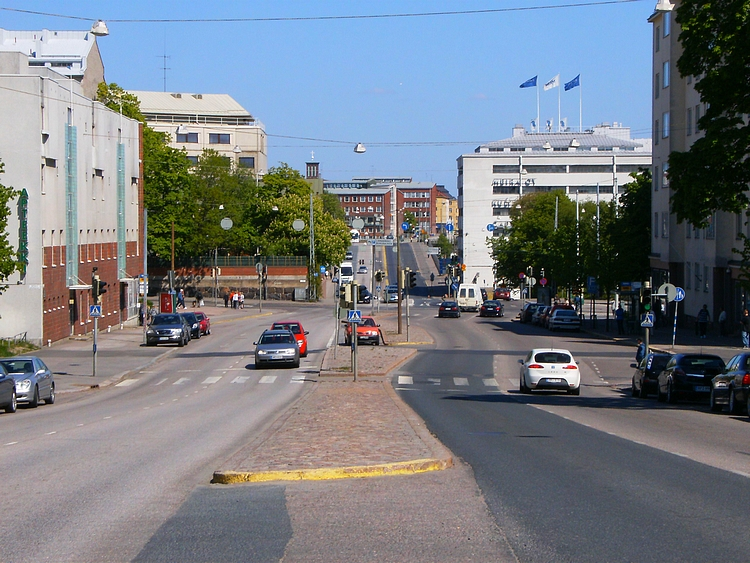
- Sturenkatu street towards the east in Alppiharju.

- Position of Alppiharju within Helsinki
- Country: Finland
- Region: Uusimaa
- Sub-region: Greater Helsinki
- Municipality: Helsinki
- District: Central
- Area: 0.87 km^{2} (0.34 sq mi)
- Population: 11,481
  - Density: 13,197/km^{2} (34,180/sq mi)
- Postal codes: 00510, 00520
- Subdivision number: 12
- Neighbouring subdivisions: Sörnäinen, Kallio, Taka-Töölö, Pasila, Vallila

Alppiharju (Swedish: Åshöjden) is a district of approximately 12,000 inhabitants in the eastern part of the Central major district of Helsinki, Finland. It consists of sub-districts Alppila and Harju, and is bordered by Kallio in the south, Taka-Töölö in the west, Pasila in the north-west and north, and Vallila in the north-east and east.

== Statistics ==
When comparing the districts of Helsinki, Alppiharju has on average the smallest apartments (average of 38 m^{2}, or 409 square feet), the highest population density (approximately 13,200 inhabitants per km^{2}, or 34,150 per square mile) and smallest households (on average 1.36 persons per household). Because of small-sized apartments, there are few families with children in Alppiharju (4% of the inhabitants of the district are under 16). At the end of the year 2012, there were 3,140 people employed in various workplaces within the Alppiharju district.

== Buildings and attractions ==
The residential buildings of Alppiharju have mainly been built during the first half of the 20th century. Bögelund cardboard factory, belonging to Serlachius company, was located at Street Aleksis Kiven katu 52–54 from year 1920. The factory ceased its operation in 1925, but the building still exists; it has been expanded and turned into a residential building. The oldest parts of the building were designed by architect W. G. Palmqvist. One of the largest condominiums in Finland, Satakallio, is located in the Harju sub-district of Alppiharju. Also Brahenkenttä, serving as a sports field used for football, basketball, minibasketball, skating and iceball, depending on the season, is located in Harju.

Amusement park Linnanmäki has been operating in the Alppila sub-district ever since the year 1950. Next to Linnanmäki is located the House of Culture that was designed by Alvar Aalto, and originally built for the Communist Party of Finland. The building was completed in 1958. On the opposite side of Linnanmäki is Park Alppipuisto, which is a popular place where people like to gather in the summertime.

== See also ==
- Vaasanpuistikko
