= Karhupuisto =

Park in Helsinki, Finland

Coordinates: 60°11′02″N 24°57′09″E

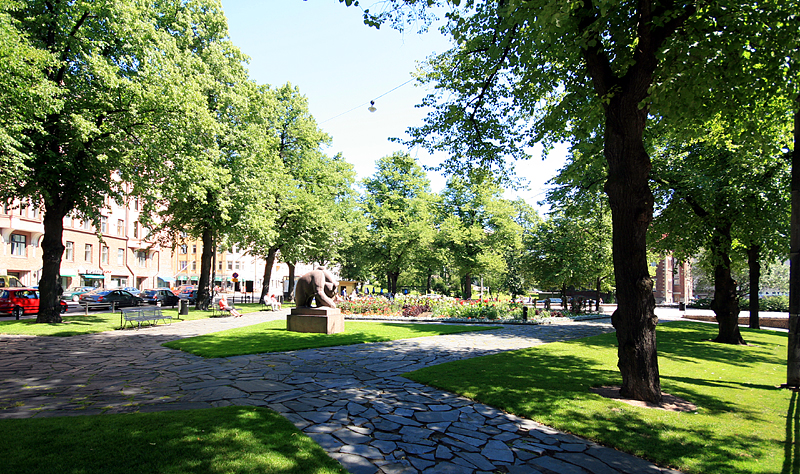
Karhupuisto, Helsinki

Karhupuisto (Swedish: Björnparken, lit. Bear Park) is a small triangular park in the Kallio district of Helsinki, Finland. It is located next to Kallio Library and Kallio Church.

The park was originally known as Agricolan puistikko (Swedish: Agricolaskvären). The current name, which it got in 1956, was inspired by the 1931 red granite statue Mesikämmen muurahaispesällä (The Bear on the Anthill) in the park. The statue by the sculptor Jussi Mäntynen depicts a bear stooping on top of an anthill.

The park was restless in the 1970s and 1980s, attracting drunkards due to its central location and causing work for the police. In the wildest years the police had to help dozens of people passed out in the park in a single day. The area was not violent, but caused nuisance for the neighbours.

In the mid-1990s a community group consisting of pensioners living in the area, neighbourhood activists, city officials and park workers, the police, Kallio parish and others started planting flowers in the park. Many people volunteered as park attendants, promising to take care of the plants. Gradually families and pensioners started frequenting the park and in a couple of years it had transformed into the communal hotspot it is today.

In 2025 the City of Helsinki turned the streets surrounding Karhupuisto into pedestrian-friendly 'summer streets' in a pilot programme intended to provide more greenery, seating and activities in the neighbourhood during the summer months. The summer street concept received positive feedback and returned in 2026. After the 2026 season, the city announced that the summer streets will return also in 2027 and permanent changes to the streets are in planning based on the experiences from the two pilot years.
