= Alppila =

Quarter of Helsinki, Finland

Coordinates: 60°11′30″N 024°56′34″E

Location of Alppila within Helsinki

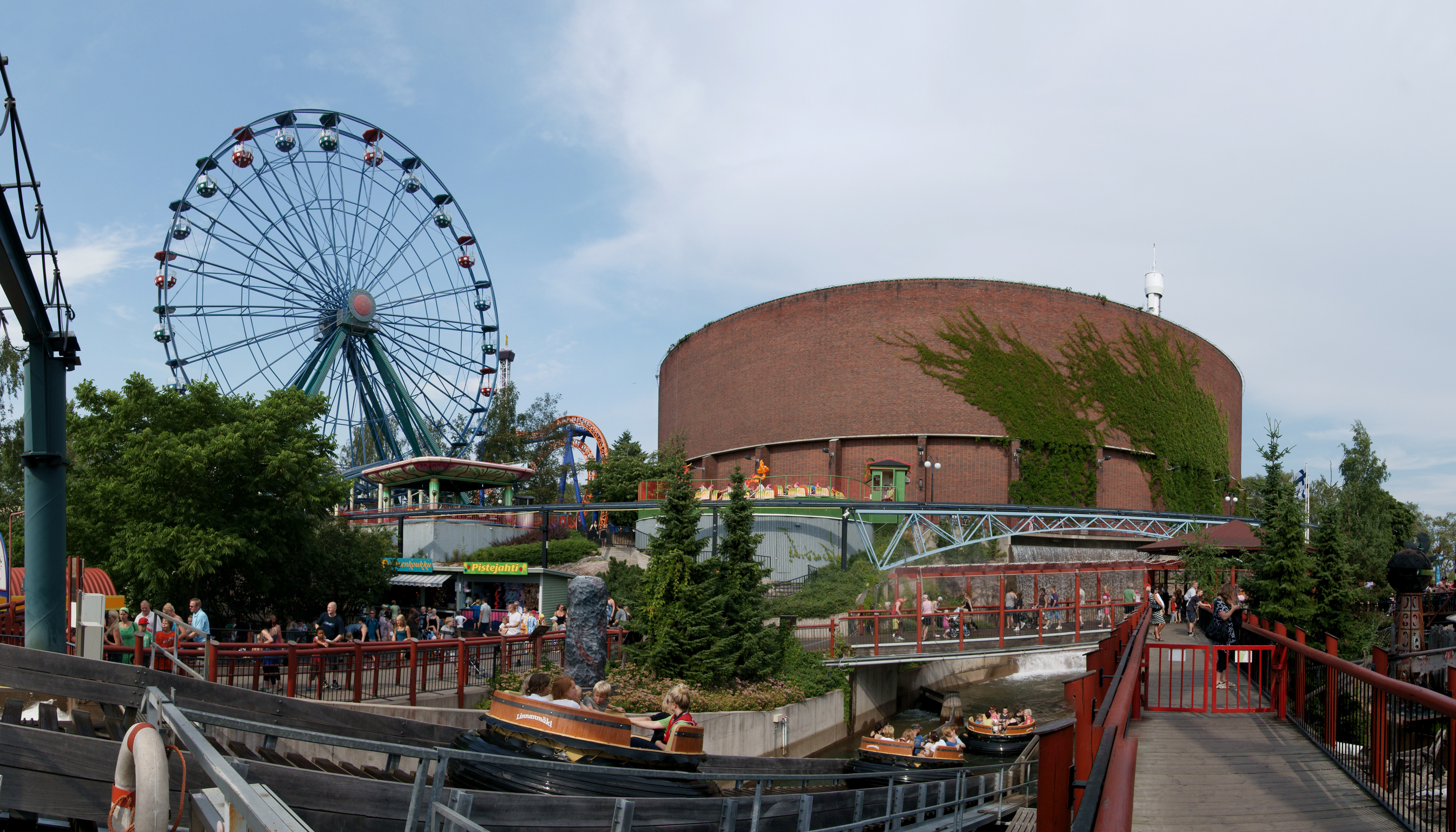
Alppila water tower in the Linnanmäki Amusement Park, Helsinki

Alppila (Swedish: Alphyddan) is a quarter of Helsinki, Finland. It is located north of the city centre, between the districts of Kallio and Pasila, and together with Harju it forms the district of Alppiharju. Alppila has a population of 4,244 (as of 2005) and an area of 0.60 km^{2}.

The Linnanmäki amusement park and the Kulttuuritalo (House of Culture) are located in Alppila.

The Alppila Church, a 1957 structure next to the amusement park, serves several different minorities, including Chinese, Estonian, and Hungarian.
