= Kulttuuritalo =

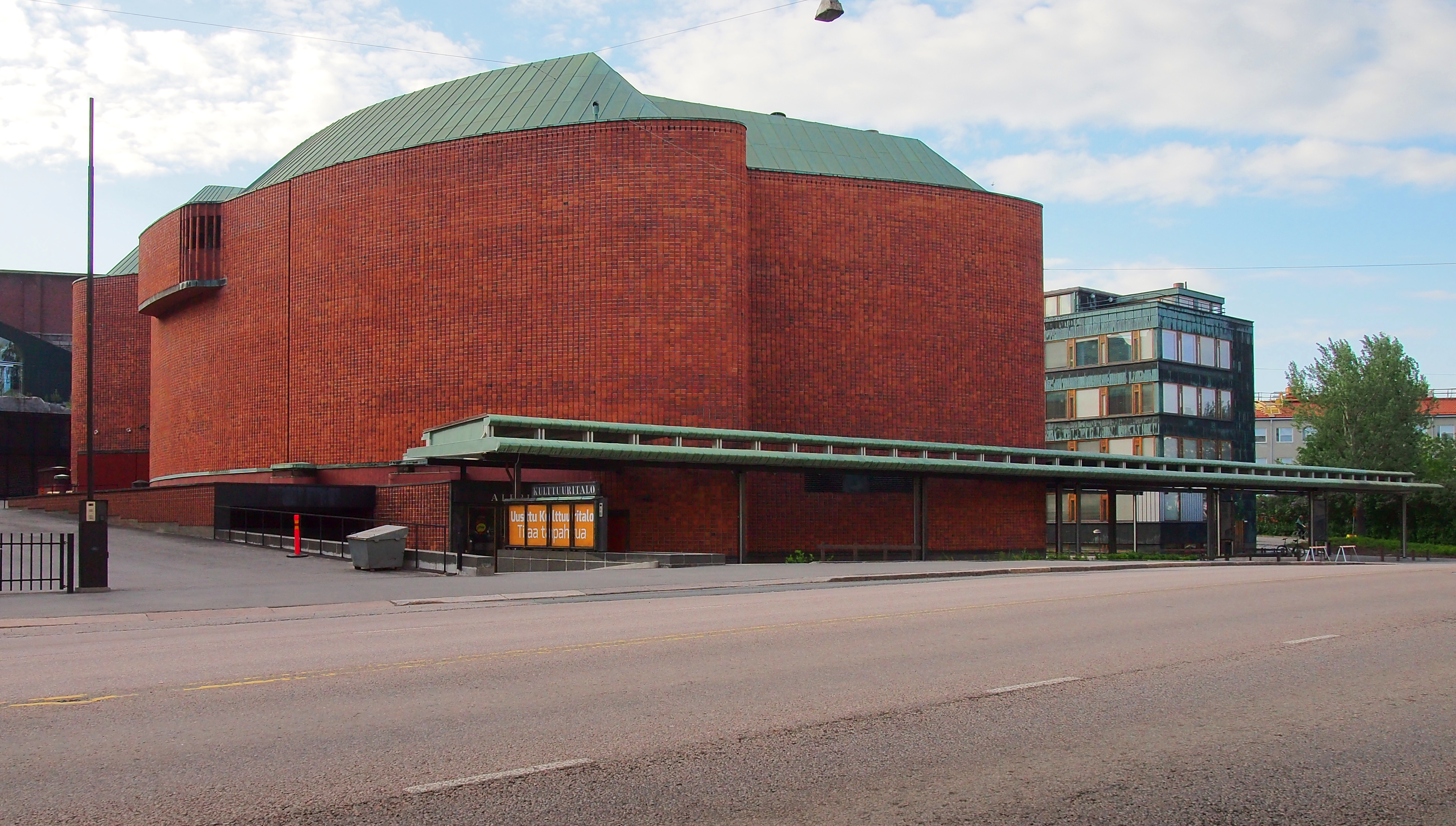
- Interactive map of the Kulttuuritalo area

General information
- Type: Cultural
- Architectural style: Modern
- Location: Alppila, Helsinki, Finland, Sturenkatu 4
- Coordinates: 60°11′18″N 024°56′39″E
- Current tenants: Sodexo
- Construction started: 1955
- Completed: 1958
- Owner: Helsingin Kulttuurihub Oy

Design and construction
- Architect: Alvar Aalto

Other information
- Seating capacity: 1452 + 2

Website
- https://www.kulttuuritalo.fi/en/home/

UNESCO World Heritage Site
- Official name: House of Culture, Helsinki
- Part of: Aalto Works
- Criteria: Cultural: ii
- Reference: 1752
- Inscription: 2026 (48th Session)

Kulttuuritalo (Finnish: Kulttuuritalo; Swedish: Kulturhuset) is a building in Alppila, Helsinki, Finland. The building was designed by Alvar Aalto, and is considered to be one of his main works. In July 2026, the House of Culture, along with 12 other Aalto Works, was designated by UNESCO as a World Heritage Site.

== Description ==
The building combines a concert hall, an office building and a lecture-theatre block connecting the two. Uniting the whole, along the street frontage, is a 60-metre (200 ft) canopy.

== History ==
Kulttuuritalo was originally built for Finnish Communist cultural organizations. Aalto designed the building pro bono and was given complete artistic freedom; the construction work was done largely by volunteers. Work began in 1955, and the building was opened in 1958.

The building was owned by the Communist Party by a nonprofit foundation until the 1990, when the bankruptcy of the Finnish Communist Party forced its sale.

Today its owned by the government owned Senate Properties. The building is protected by a decision made by the Finnish Council of State in 1989.

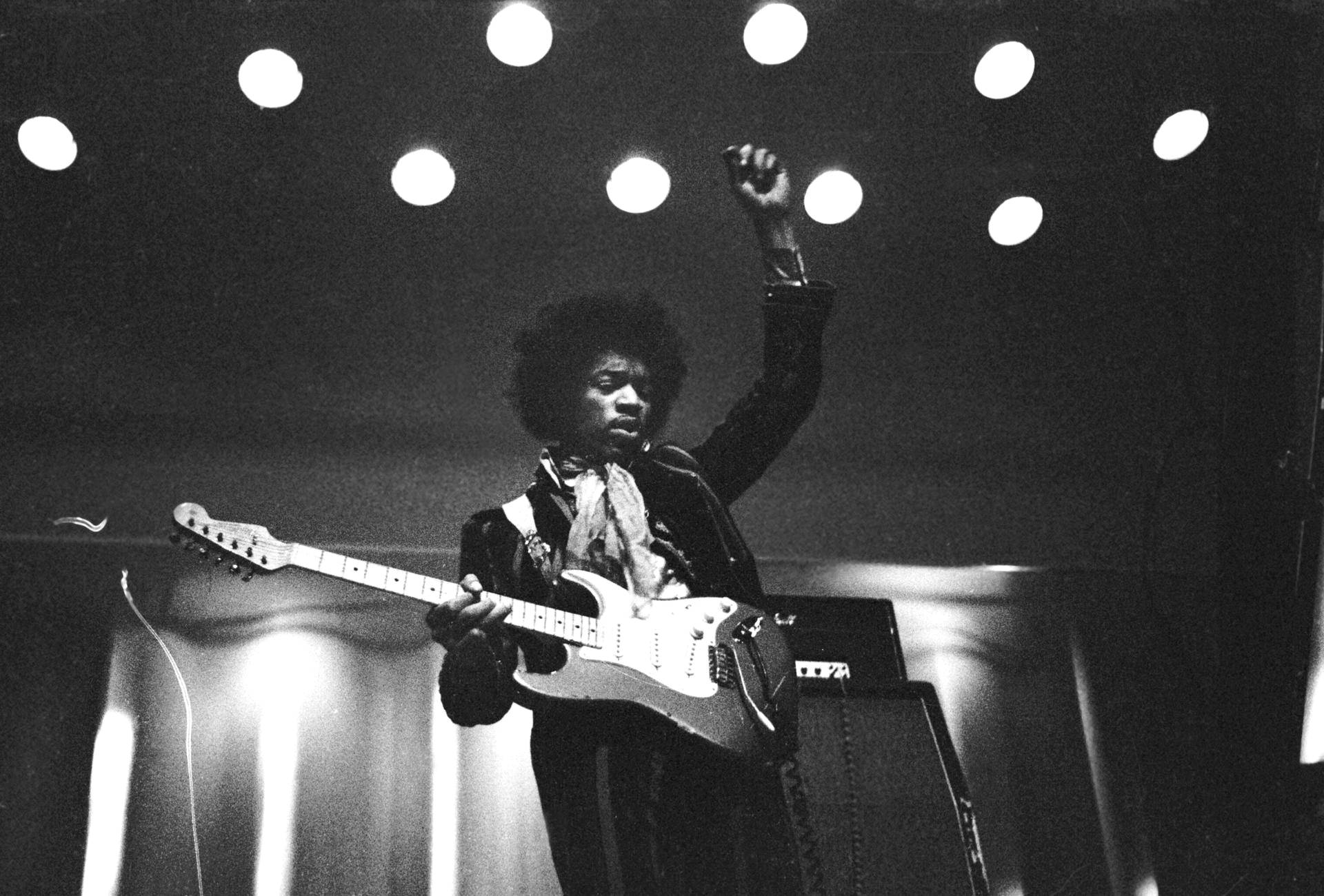
Jimi Hendrix performing at Kulttuuritalo on May 22, 1967

Notable artists who have played at the venue include:

- Duke Ellington in 1961, 1963, and 1964
- Ella Fitzgerald in 1963, 1964, and 1965
- Jimi Hendrix in 1967
- Cream in 1967
- Led Zeppelin in 1970
- Jethro Tull in 1970, 1994, 2000, 2001, 2006, 2009, 2022, and 2023
- Status Quo in 1973, 1974, 1996, and 2017
- Frank Zappa in 1974 (Three concerts in September 1974, portions of which were released on You Can't Do That on Stage Anymore, Vol. 2 in 1988)
- Queen in 1974
- AC/DC in 1977
- Ramones in 1977 and 1990
- New Order in 1981
- Mireille Mathieu in 1982
- Tina Turner in 1982
- Metallica in 1984
- Hanoi Rocks in 1985
- Leonard Cohen in 1985
- Johnny Winter in 1987
- Iron Maiden in 1995
- Lady Gaga in 2009
- Stratovarius in 2010
- Helloween in 2010
- Muse in 2025
