= Vallila =

Coordinates: 60°11′40″N 24°57′24″E

Vallila Vallgård
- Helsinki Subdivision
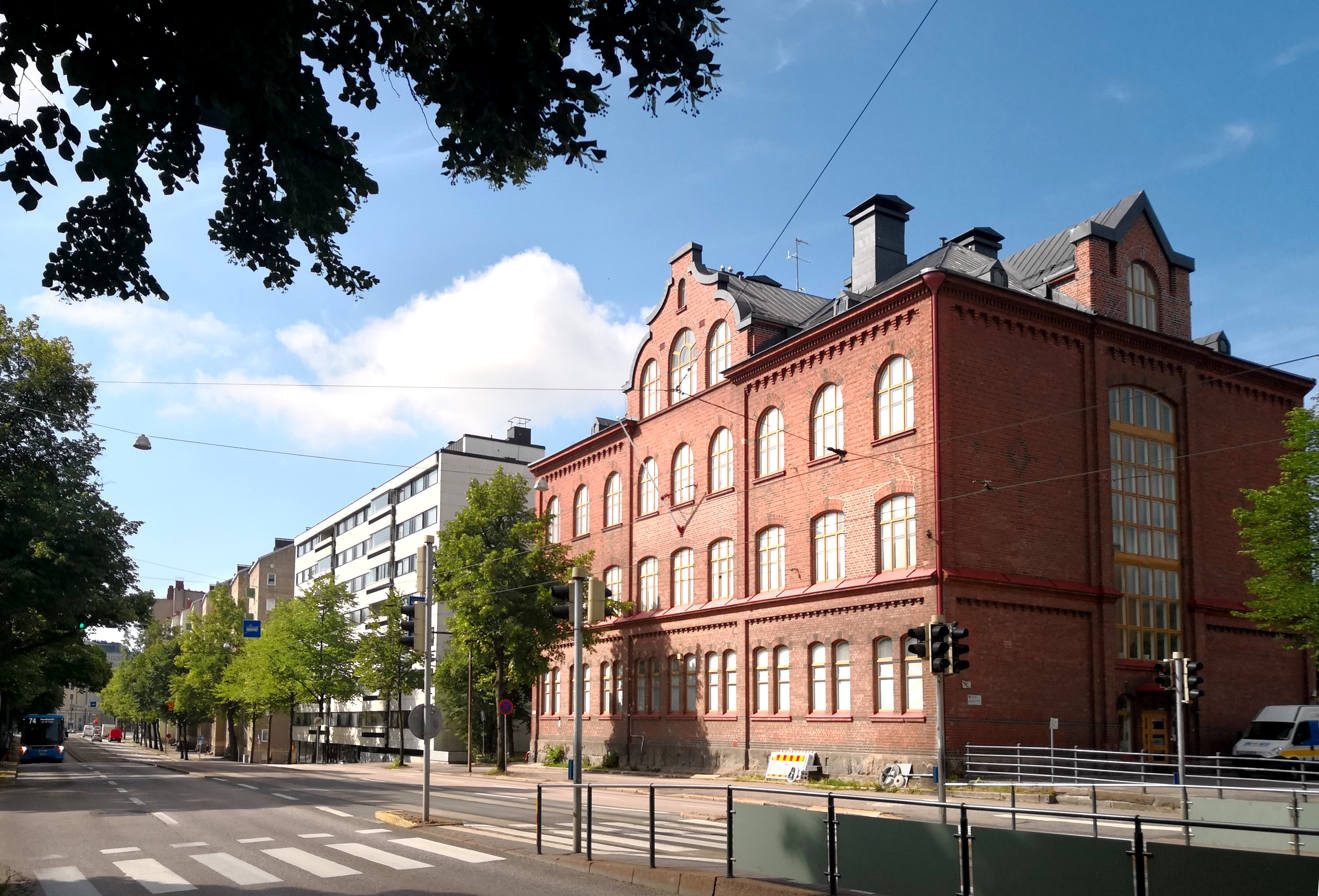
- The Vallila Folk School along Hämeentie

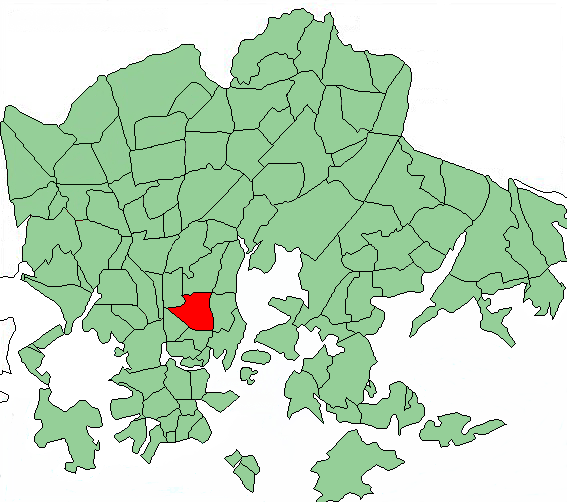
- Position of Vallila within Helsinki
- Country: Finland
- Region: Uusimaa
- Sub-region: Greater Helsinki
- Municipality: Helsinki
- District: Central
- Area: 1.30 km^{2} (0.50 sq mi)
- Population (2020-12-31): 10 462
  - Density: 8,048/km^{2} (20,840/sq mi)
- Postal codes: 00510, 00520, 00550
- Subdivision number: 22
- Neighbouring subdivisions: Sörnäinen, Alppiharju, Pasila, Hermanni, Toukola, Kumpula

Vallila (Swedish: Vallgård) is a neighbourhood in Helsinki, the capital of Finland. It is a central-northern neighbourhood, bordered by Pasila to the west and Alppiharju to the south. Like Kallio, Vallila is mostly residential and has a reputation of being a working-class neighbourhood. In the past two decades people from artistic professions have found the area. Vallila though still retains its roots from 1910s to 1980s by being one of the rare neighbourhoods which still has an industrial area and abundant amount of workshop businesses.

Because of gentrification Vallila is nowadays considered a trendy area in Helsinki (like Kallio) among young adults and housing is expensive, particularly in Puu-Vallila. Several major companies, such as S Group, Telia Finland, OP Financial Group and Nordea, have their headquarters in Vallila.

Vallila is famous for its many old wooden houses dating back to the 1900s–1920s, which are spread over many blocks. Many buildings by the main streets are fine examples of Nordic Classicism from the 1920s–1930s. It is located closest to the city center of all the wooden-house residential areas in Helsinki. This area is called Puu-Vallila (Wooden Vallila). Puu-Vallila was built 1910, while the rest of Vallila was built in the 1920s and 1930s. Before this Vallila was a villa area for wealthy people living in Helsinki centre.

Perhaps the most famous scene in Vallila is the small flea market square featured in Aki Kaurismäki's film The Man Without a Past.

Ville Valo, lead singer for the Finnish band HIM, was born in Vallila.

Vallila is also the name of a basic city administrative district. It includes both Vallila and Hermanni neighbourhoods and has 16,851 inhabitants. Vallila itself has 10,462 inhabitants (31.12.2020).

In the 2025 Time Out's "Coolest Neighbourhoods in the World" list, Vallila ranked 9th out of 39 neighbourhoods on the list.
