= Siltasaari =

Siltasaari Broholmen
- Helsinki Subdivision
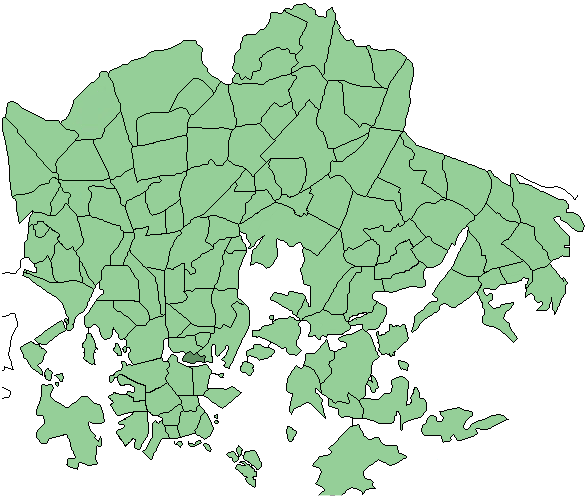
- Position of Siltasaari within Helsinki
- Coordinates: 60.17678°N 24.95089°E
- Country: Finland
- Region: Uusimaa
- Sub-region: Greater Helsinki
- Municipality: Helsinki
- District: Central
- Area: 0.22 km^{2} (0.085 sq mi)
- Population: 2,266
  - Density: 10,300/km^{2} (27,000/sq mi)
- Postal codes: 00500, 00530
- Subdivision number: 111
- Neighbouring subdivisions: Kruununhaka, Kluuvi, Linjat, Sörnäinen

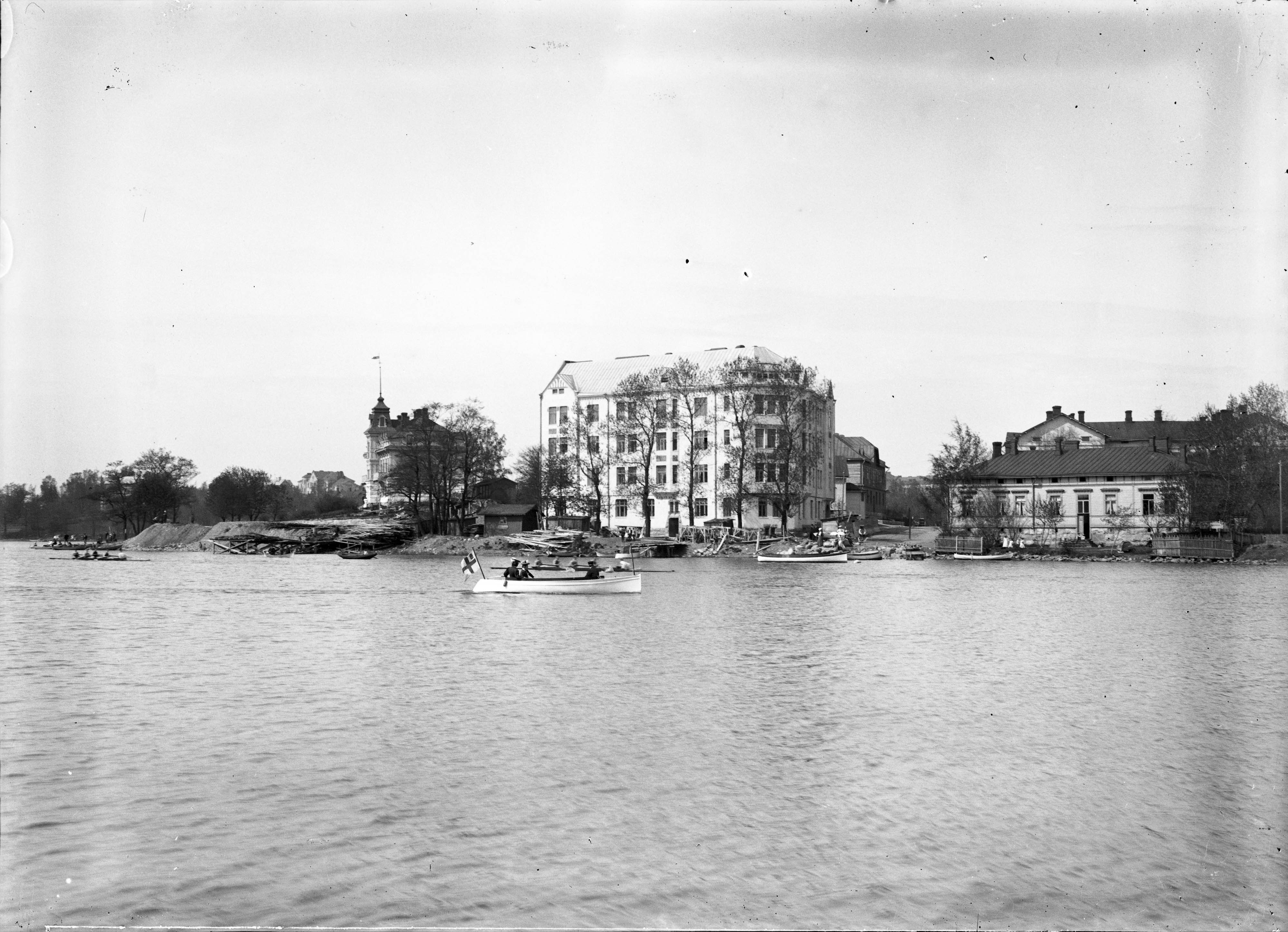
Siltasaari around 1900.

Siltasaari (Finnish), or Broholmen (Swedish), is a central neighborhood of Helsinki, Finland. Most of its area is unofficially known also as Hakaniemi.
