= Sörnäinen metro station =

Helsinki Metro station

Sörnäinen Sörnäs
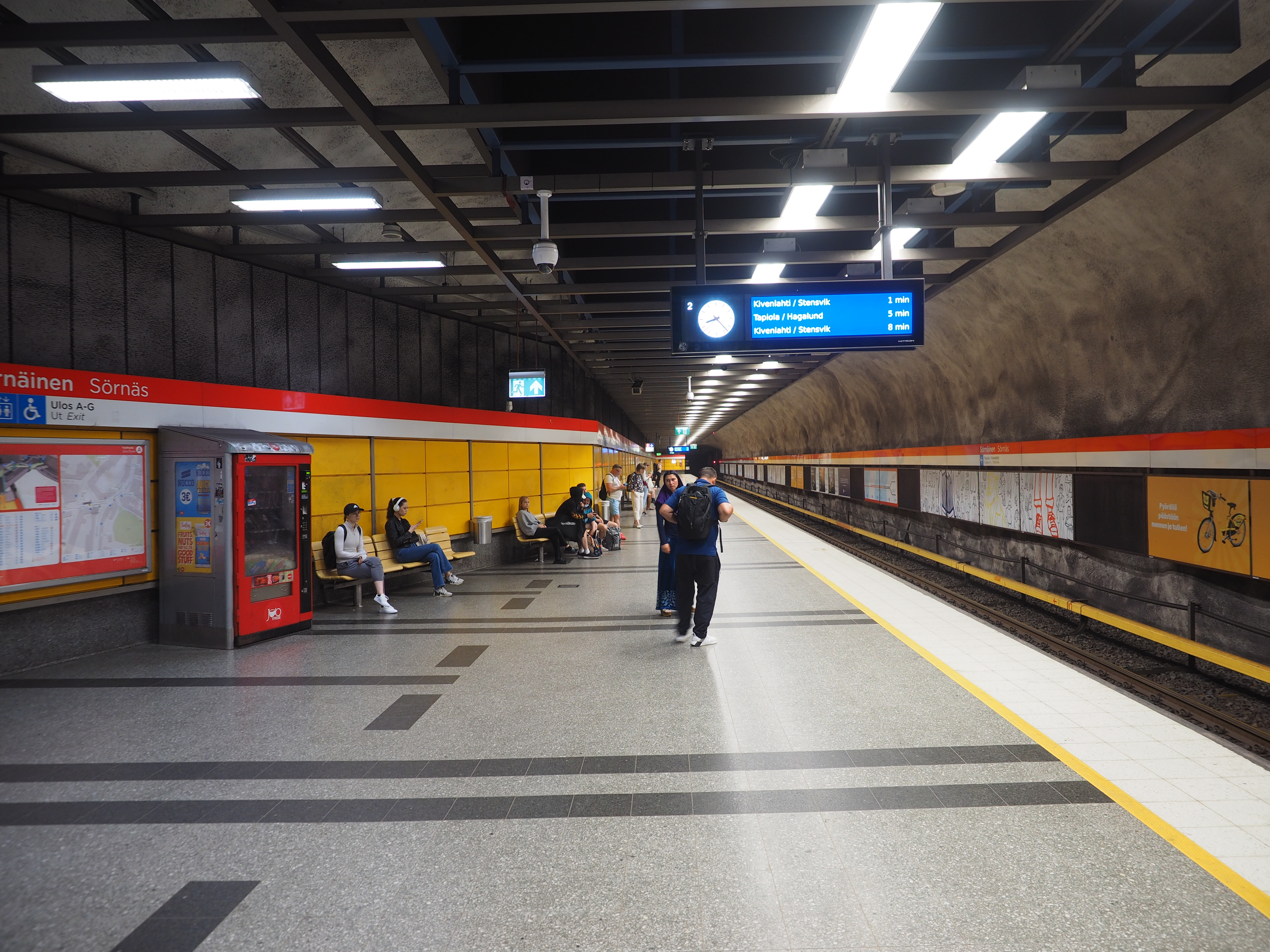

General information
- Location: Helsinginkatu 1, Helsinki
- Coordinates: 60°11′15″N 24°57′40″E
- System: Helsinki Metro station
- Owner: HKL
- Platforms: 1 island platform
- Tracks: 2
- Connections: Helsinki tram lines 1 6 7 8 Helsinki buses

Construction
- Structure type: Underground
- Depth: 25 m (82 ft)
- Accessible: Yes

Other information
- Fare zone: A

History
- Opened: 1 September 1984

Passengers
- 56,000 daily

Services
Preceding station	Helsinki Metro	Following station
Hakaniemi towards Kivenlahti	M1	Kalasatama towards Vuosaari
Hakaniemi towards Tapiola	M2	Kalasatama towards Mellunmäki
Location

Sörnäinen metro station (Finnish: Sörnäisten metroasema, Swedish: Sörnäs metrostation) is a station on the Helsinki Metro. It serves the central Helsinki districts of Sörnäinen and Kallio. Sörnäinen is the easternmost station on the system to be located underground.

The station was opened on 1 September 1984 and was designed by Jouko Kontio and Seppo Kilpiä. It is located 900 meters from Hakaniemi metro station, and 1.1 kilometers from Kalasatama metro station. The station is situated at a depth of 25 meters below ground level and 3 meters below sea level.

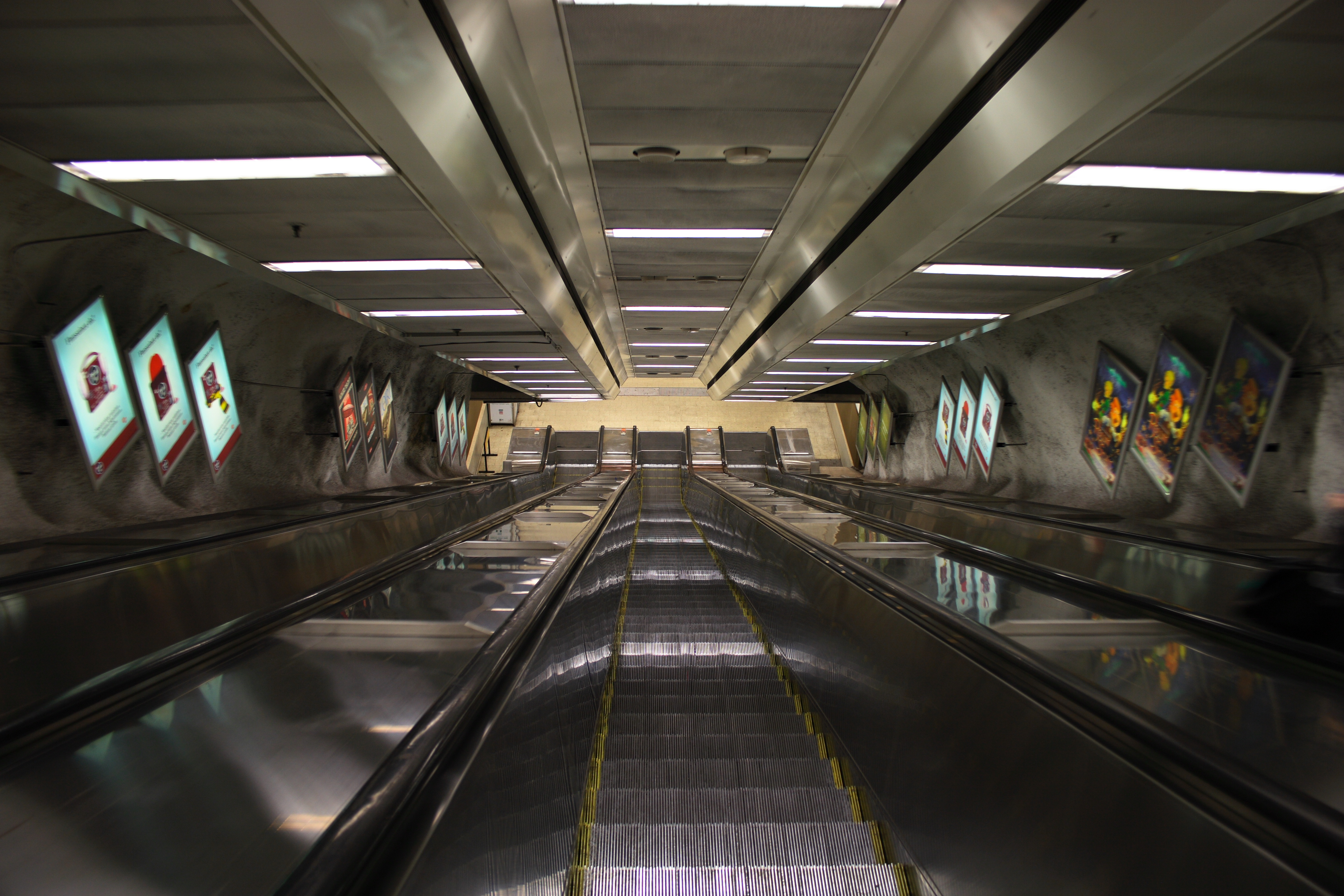
Metro station escalators

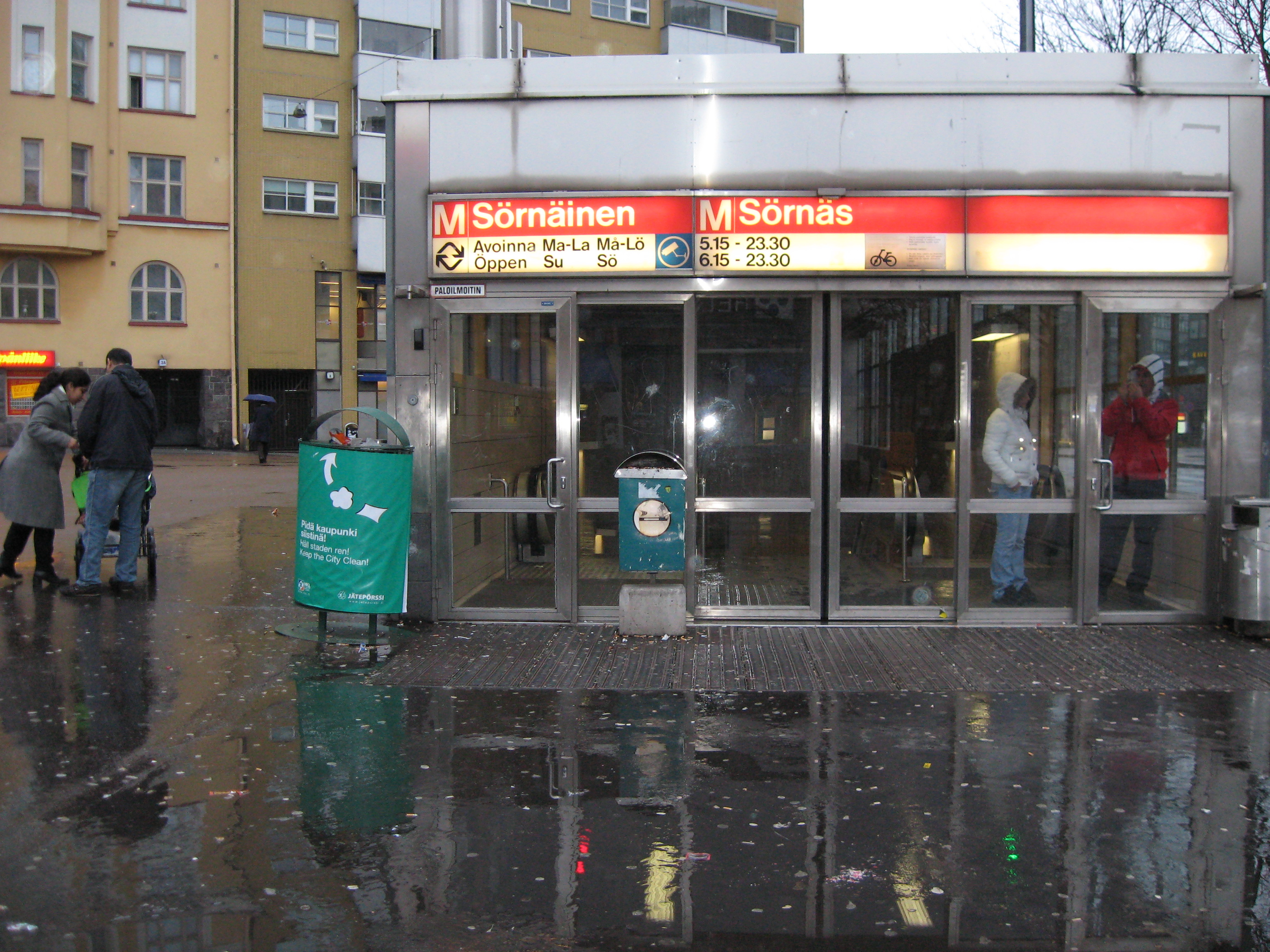
Station entrance, pre-facelift

== See also ==
- Sörnäinen curve
