= Sörnäinen =

Coordinates: 60°11′N 24°58′E

Sörnäinen Sörnäs
- Helsinki Subdivision
- Position of Sörnäinen within Helsinki
- Country: Finland
- Region: Uusimaa
- Sub-region: Greater Helsinki
- Municipality: Helsinki
- District: Central
- Area: 166 km^{2} (64 sq mi)
- Population (1 January 2004): 7,052
  - Density: 4,248/km^{2} (11,000/sq mi)
- Postal codes: 00500, 00580
- Subdivision number: 10
- Neighbouring subdivisions: Kruununhaka, Kallio, Alppiharju, Mustikkamaa–Korkeasaari, Hermanni, Vallila, Kulosaari

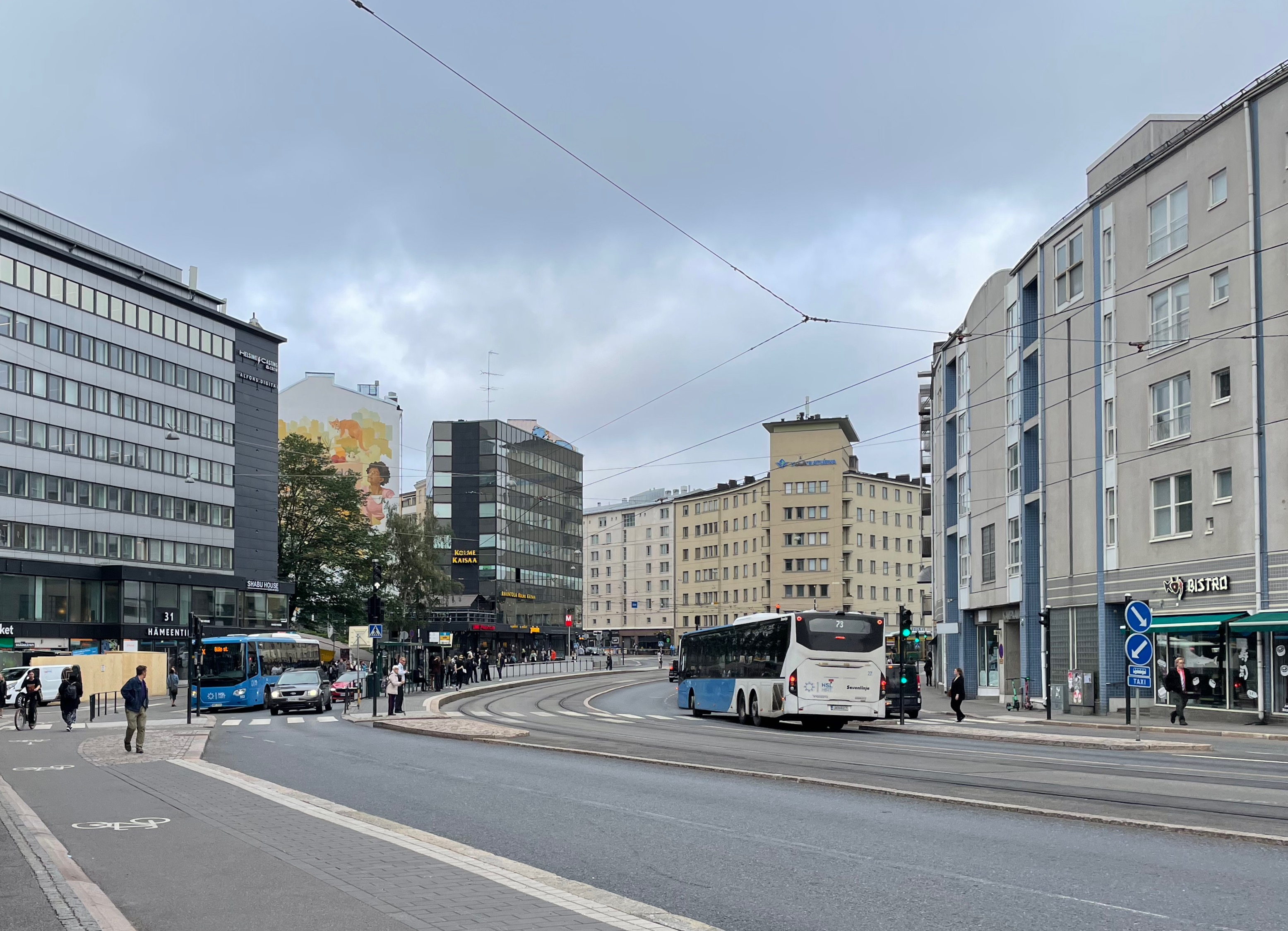
The Sörnäinen curve

Sörnäinen (Swedish: Sörnäs; Sörkkä or Sörkka in Helsinki slang) is a neighbourhood in the city of Helsinki, Finland.

Sörnäinen is located a little more than one kilometre north from the coastal centre of Helsinki, near the district of Hakaniemi. The east side of Sörnäinen borders the sea.

Sörnäinen used to be primarily an industrial district with many shipping companies and warehouses, however, nowadays it is a thriving urban area divided into four districts: Vilhonvuori, Kalasatama, Sompasaari and Hanasaari. It also has two metro stations: Sörnäinen metro station and Kalasatama metro station in the Kalasatama quarter.

The headquarters of Senate Properties (Senaatti-kiinteistöt) is located in Sörnäinen. Also the Helsinki Prison is located there.

== Etymology ==
The name "Sörnäinen" comes from the Swedish name "Södernäs" ("Southern cape") and was first mentioned in the foundation document for the New Helsinki in 1639, although the name is probably much older. At the time, there were plans to relocate the city to the area of present-day Sörnäinen. In the end, the city was relocated to Vironniemi instead. Already in the 18th century the name Södernäs had changed to the dialectical form Sörnäs on maps. In Finnish, the name was first used as "Sörnäsi" in the late 19th century and then as "Söörnäinen" in the early 20th century. In 1928 it was officially established as Sörnäinen - Sörnäs.

In Helsinki slang the area is known by the names Sörkka and Sörkkä. These names probably come from the Swedish language slang name Sörckan.

== History ==
=== Birth of the harbour ===
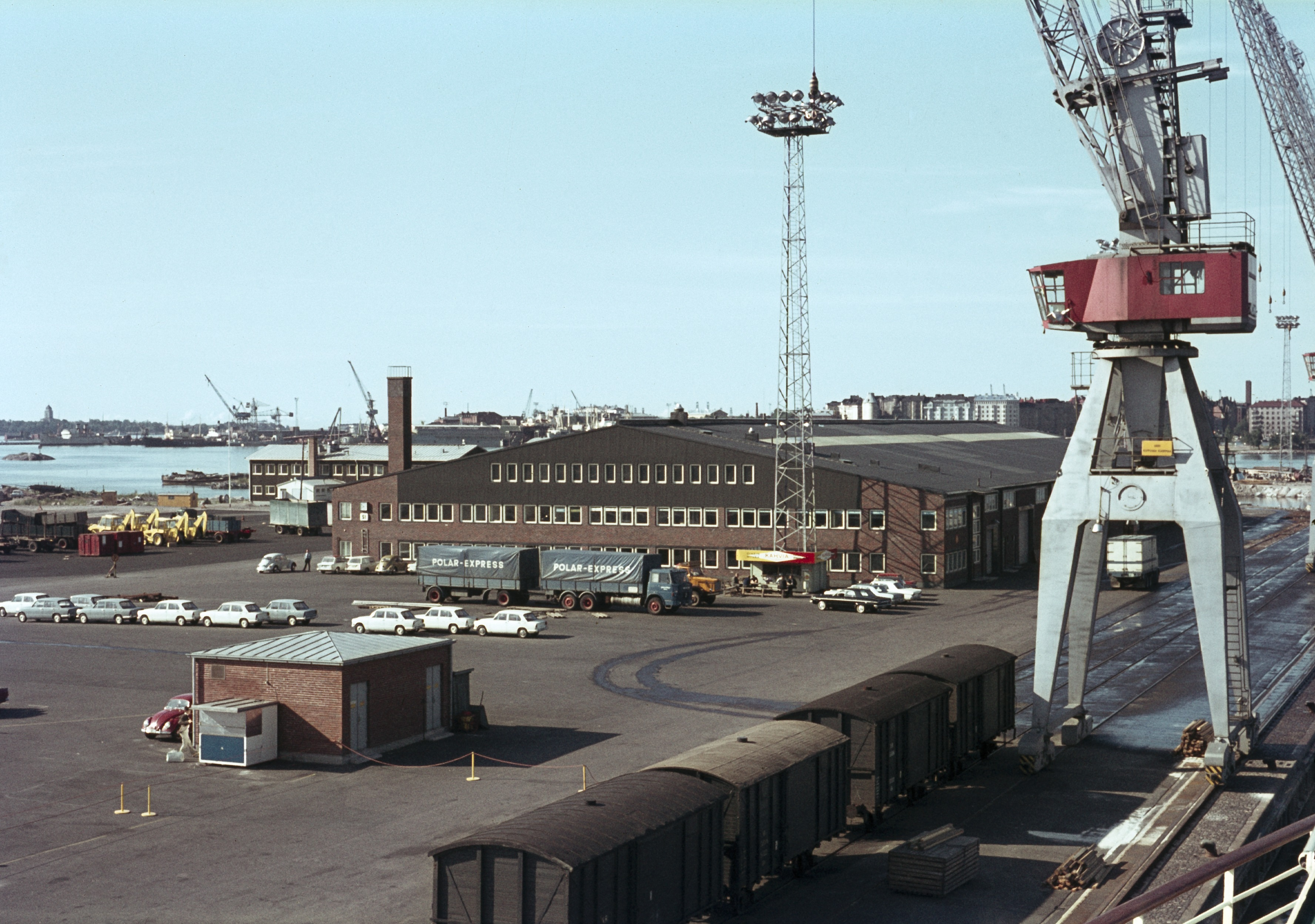
The Sörnäinen Harbour was in use until 2008.

In the early 19th century the area of present-day Sörnäinen consisted of countryside, although there was already a brick factory in Lintulahti at the time. Sörnäinen began to industrialise in 1825, when the city ordered factories and workspaces to be located on the edges of the city because of danger of fires. Building the street Itäinen Viertotie (now known as Hämeentie) from Siltasaari to Kumpula in the 1850s was important for the development of the eastern part of the city proper. Factories rose on the eastern side of the street and residential buildings on the western side. The largest continuous industrial area formed on the Sörnäinen shore when the Sörnäinen Harbour was built there. Finland's first harbour track, the Sörnäinen harbour rail, was built in 1863. The track led from Pasila to the Sörnäinen harbour along Teollisuuskatu. This started the rapid growth of Sörnäinen.

The harbour was expanded by the growth of exports in the 1860s and 1870s. In 1889 Finland's first oil harbour was built in the area, but it was later moved to Herttoniemi because of fire security reasons in 1938. The harbour switched from export to import in the late 19th century, when the forestry export started to travel via Kotka and Vyborg.

=== Other industry ===
Sörnäinen has been a central area in electricity production. The Suvilahti power plant was taken into use in 1909. The A plant of the Hanasaari Power Plant was built in 1960 and the B plant was built in 1974. The A plant was dismantled in 2008, and the B plant was shut down on April 1, 2023.

Near the former Sörnäinen Harbour, along both sides of Sörnäisten rantatie, there have been many factories, for example Kone- ja Siltarakennus and the Elanto factories. Early industrial facilities of the area include the Kokos factory built in 1911, which represented the same architectural age and style as the Suvilahti power plant. The factory made soap and margarine from coconut fat. In 1926 the premises were bought by Kone, which used them to make elevators. Kone moved away from the premises in 1967. The logistically outdated premises were left empty and were bought by the working class oriented building company Haka to be dismantled, but the youth of the city squatted the premises in 1990. After the squat the Kokos factory was closed down, and the Helsinki Theatre Academy has worked at the premises since 2000. The economic activity of the working class was concentrated on Sörnäinen for a long time: premises located in the area included OTK-EKA's and Elanto's red brick headquarters designed by Väinö Vähäkallio in the 1920s as well as storehouses, logistics, Elanto's main bakery, the main mill of OTK, a coffee roaster and other activities. The premises have since been converted into apartments, offices and academic premises. After the industry moved away, the Partek headquarters were built on Sörnäisten rantatie, whose exhibition space has been converted to the library of the working class movement.

Urban construction spread from Sörnäinen to Kallio, when a group of industrialists founded a joint-stock company to house their workers, which caused a row of "corporate villas" to be built. Large numbers of workers lived in the villas. Many of the apartments lacked a toilet and entire families of four people could live in a single small room. These proletariat conditions gave rise to the Helsinki slang in the early 20th century.

=== Residential use ===
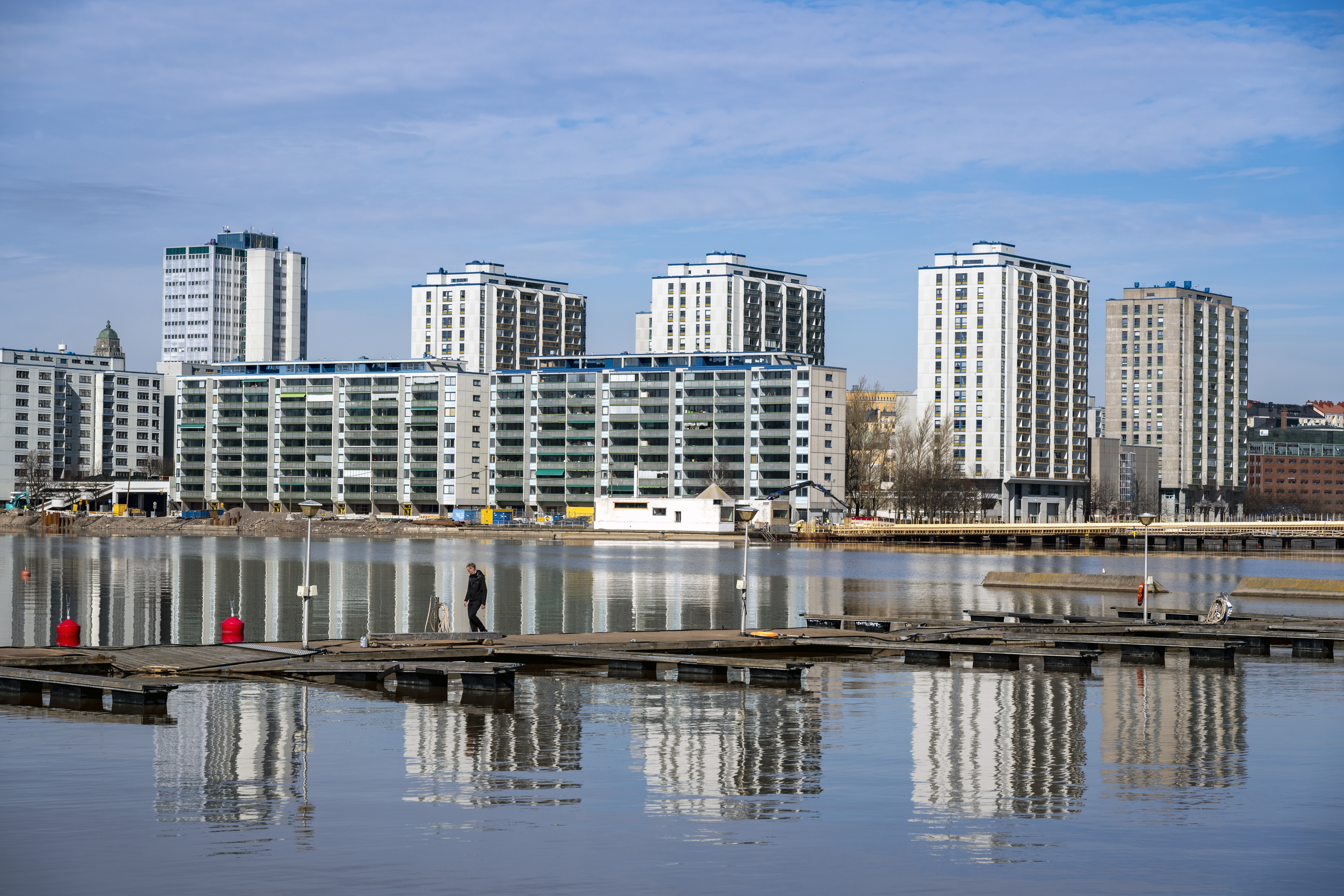
Merihaka, belonging to the Vilhonvuori quarter, was built on the Sörnäinen shore, partly on reclaimed land, in the 1970s.

The city proper gradually grew too tight for industrial activities, which moved away to the suburbs. Converting old industrial premises to residential areas started in Merihaka in the 1970s and is still ongoing. A new Lintulahti residential area has been built on the old industrial area of Sörnäinen, as well as jobs, cultural services and the Helsinki Theatre Academy. The Sörnäinen harbour, which had been in use for over a century, was shut down in November 2008 after the completion of the Vuosaari Harbour. The immediate surroundings are being developed in accordance of the changed nature of the area.

Along with the rest of the city proper, Sörnäinen, Alppiharju and Kallio are among the most tightly-built areas in Helsinki and in the whole of Finland. The percentage of small apartments is the largest in Helsinki: a whole 80 percent. Because of the small size of the apartments, most of the residents are young adults living alone, or elder or childless couples.

A new marine Kalasatama area is being built as part of the eastern part of the city proper in the Sörnäinen harbour area and its surroundings from the 2010s to the 2030s. It will house 25 thousand inhabitants and 10 thousand jobs. The old harbour areas of Sompasaari and Nihti are also being converted into residential areas.

== Traffic ==
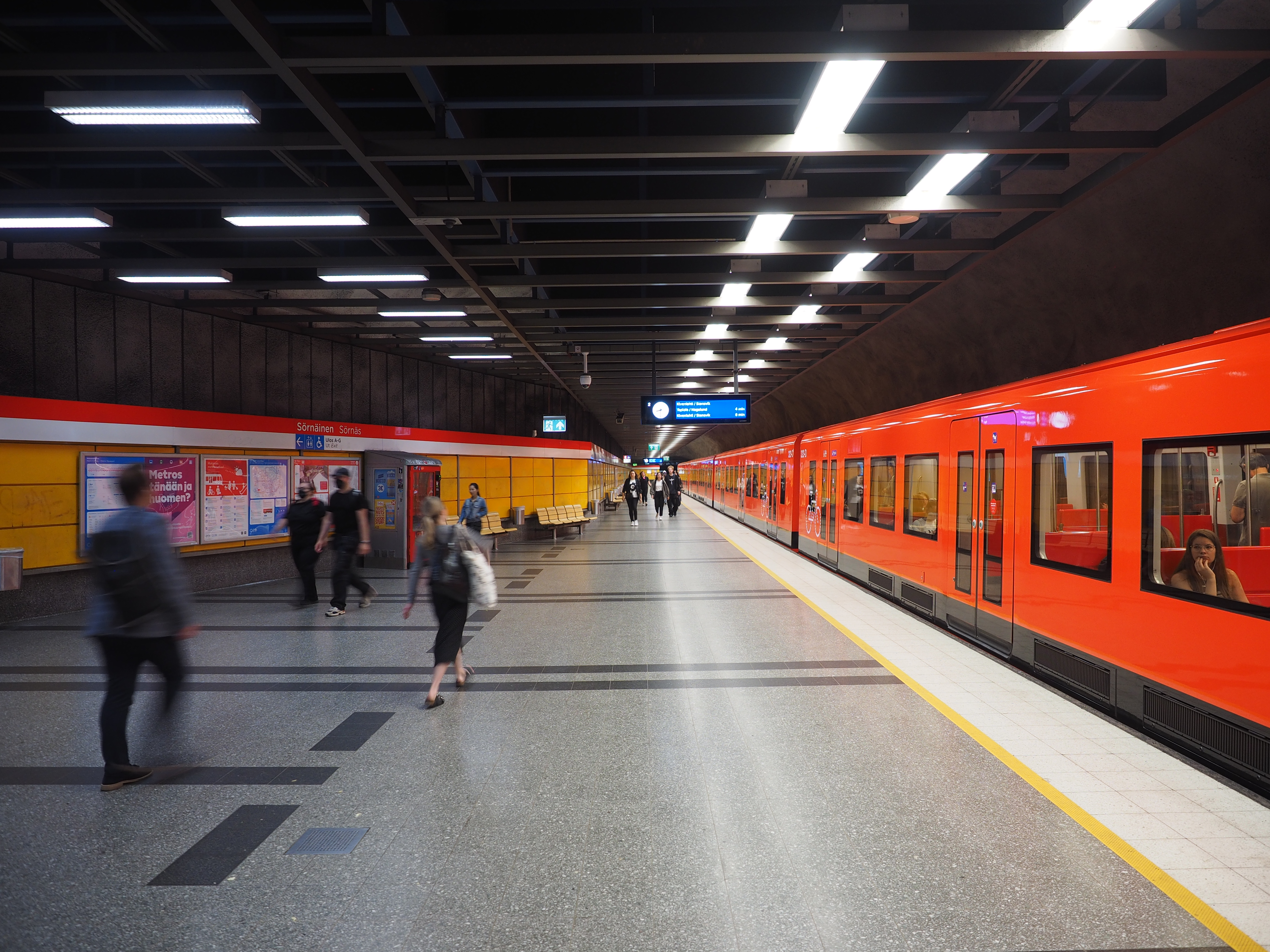
The Sörnäinen metro station is located at the Sörnäinen curve, at an intersection point of public transport.

In the eastern part of the city proper, the number of cars in proportion to the population is the smallest in the entire city of Helsinki. The area is well served with basic services which are often close by. The Sörnäinen area is served by almost all bus lines going from the city centre to northeastern and eastern Helsinki as well as eastern Vantaa, along with several through-city lines. Particularly the so-called Sörnäinen curve is a traffic hub for many public transport lines. Many Helsinki tram lines run along Hämeentie, and the Sörnäinen metro station was taken into use and the Kalasatama metro station in 2007. The public transport connections from the area to all around the capital region are excellent.

== See also ==
- Hermanni (Helsinki)
- Kalasatama
- Merihaka
- Suvilahti
