= Hämeentie =

Street in Helsinki, Finland

Coordinates: 60.1892°N 24.9643°E

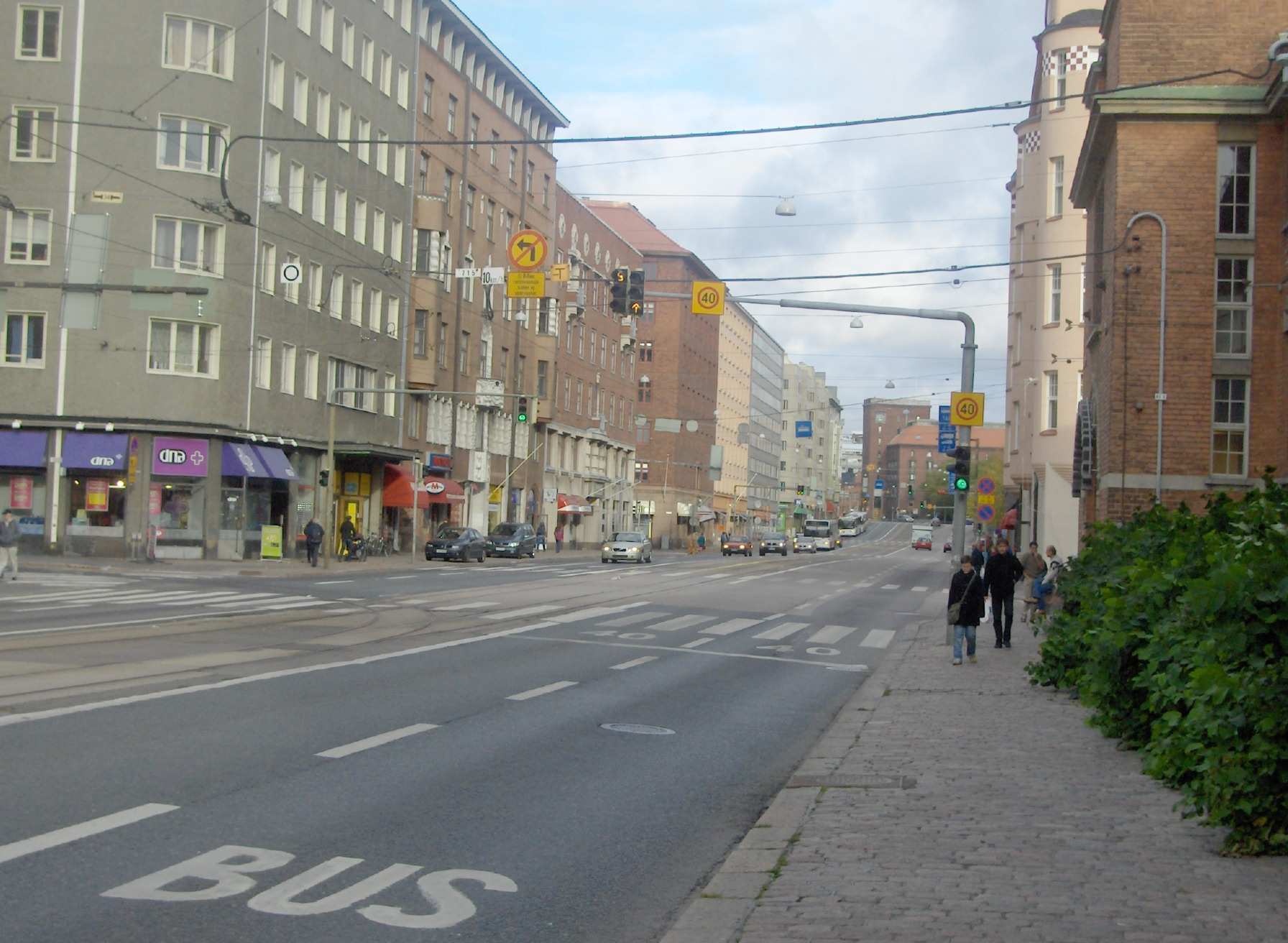
Hämeentie.

Hämeentie (Swedish: Tavastvägen) is the second longest street in Helsinki, Finland, and among its major thoroughfares. Hämeentie is a multi-lane street beginning at the Hakaniemi square in Siltasaari, and ending near Vanhankaupunginkoski on Koskelantie.

Old streets were made into main roads in the 1850s, and the eastern one was named Itäinen Viertotie (Swedish: Östra Chaussén) from 1909 to 1928. It was one of Helsinki's main entryways, the other being Läntinen Viertotie (Swedish: Västra Chaussén), from 1942 named Mannerheimintie. Hämeentie originally formed the starting part of a main road leading from Helsinki to Hämeenlinna, travelling through the districts of Viikki, Malmi (nowadays Kirkonkyläntie) and Hyrylä.
