= Borgström Tobacco Factory =

Tobacco processing plant in Finland

Coordinates: 60.1703°N 24.9589°E

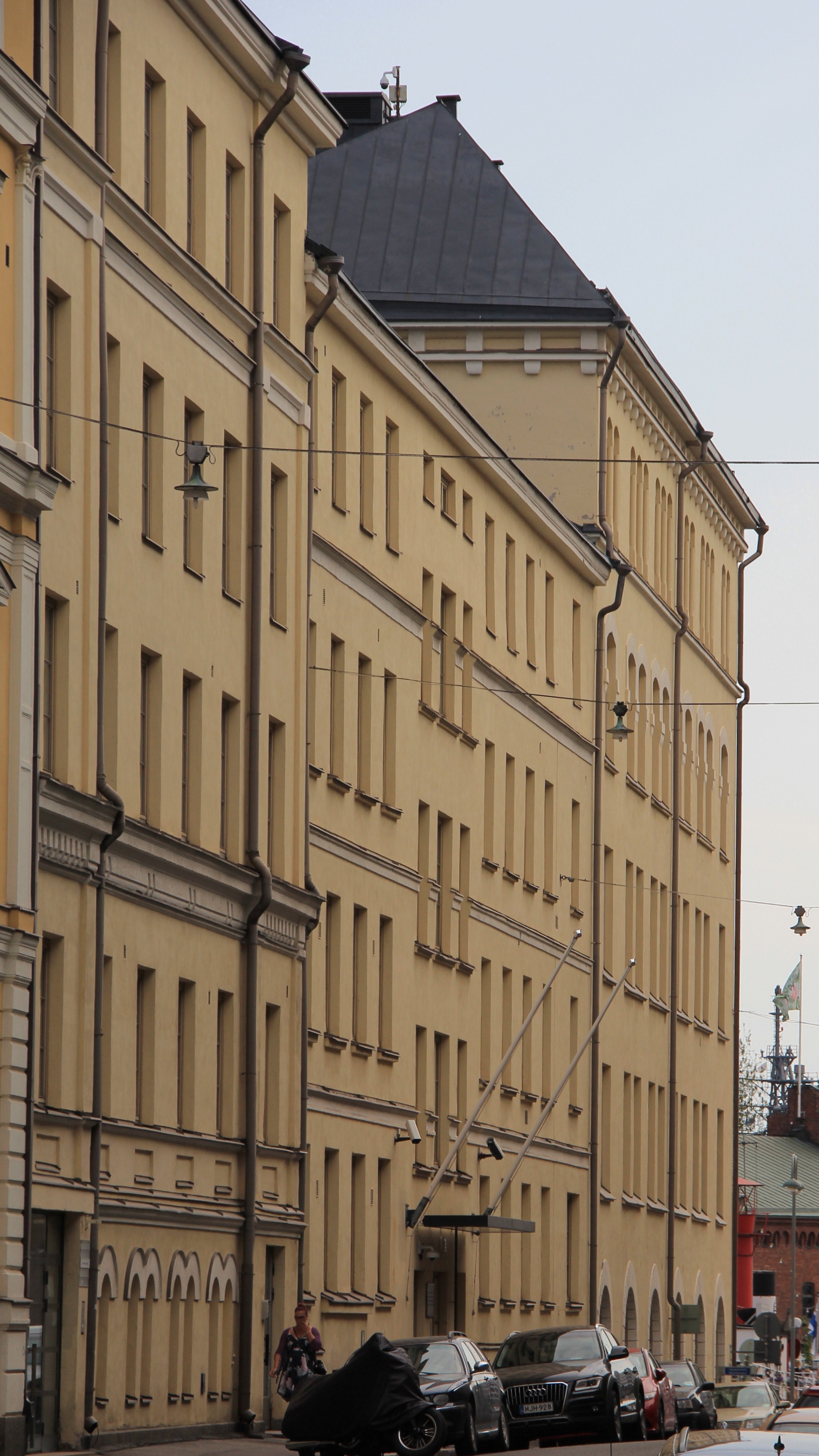
Borgström tobacco factory buildings seen from Meritullinkatu.

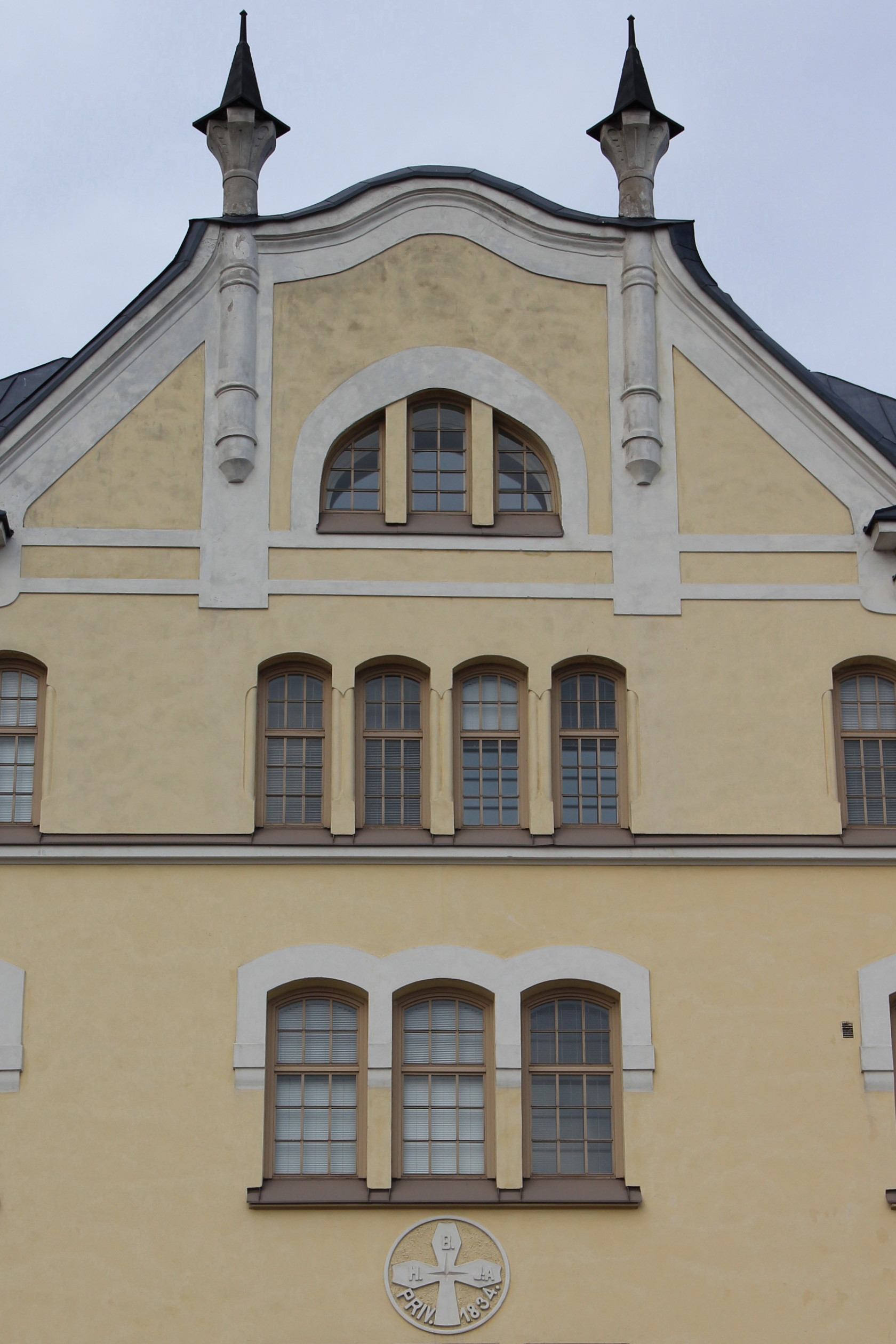
The factory building at Meritullintor; the company emblem, a clover leaf, is visible on the facade.

The Borgström Tobacco Factory was a tobacco manufacturing center located at Meritullinkatu 1 in Kruununhaka, Helsinki, Uusimaa, Finland, from 1839 onwards. The Borgström company was founded by trade advisor Henrik Borgström (Senior) in 1834. The factory ceased operations in 1928.

The factory's two-story stone building finished in 1857, took eighteen years to complete, and was later expanded into a large complex with additional buildings finished in 1865, 1873 and 1888. After Henrik Borgström's death, the company passed to his son, the trade advisor Johan Leonard Borgström, and in 1903 to his son, Arthur Travers-Borgström.

The factory operated from 1904 as a limited company under the name H. Borgström J:r Tobaksfabrik Ab, and it was the largest tobacco factory in Helsinki at the beginning of the twentieth century. It counted some 700 employees in 1913, with an annual production value of 4 million marks. The factory's cigarette brands included Kaukasiska, Kalif Prima, Odessa, and Tilaus, as well as the most famous cigar brand, Fennia. The factory also produced pipe tobacco. The factory was further expanded to the side of Meritullintor with a five-story building completed in 1904, designed by Waldemar Aspelin.

During the Finnish Civil War, in connection with the occupation of Helsinki in April 1918, the end building of the tobacco factory and the cell wing building of the main garrison in Helsinki, located to the south, were damaged by artillery fire from the Imperial German Navy.

In 1919, the company's shares were transferred to Ab Ph. U. Strengberg & C:o Oy, who owned the Strengberg tobacco factory. The operation of the Borgström tobacco factory ended in August 1928 and the company was merged with Strengberg in 1929. The property on Meritullinkatu remained Strengberg's ownership, and between 1946 and 1966 the property was owned by Oy Armiro Ab, to whom Strengberg's real estate was sold in 1946. In 1966, the properties owned by Armiro were sold to Finnish tobacco tycoon Gilbert von Rettig (1928–1994).
