= Tervasaari =

Island and park in Helsinki, Finland

Coordinates: 60°10′25.2″N 24°58′6.6″E

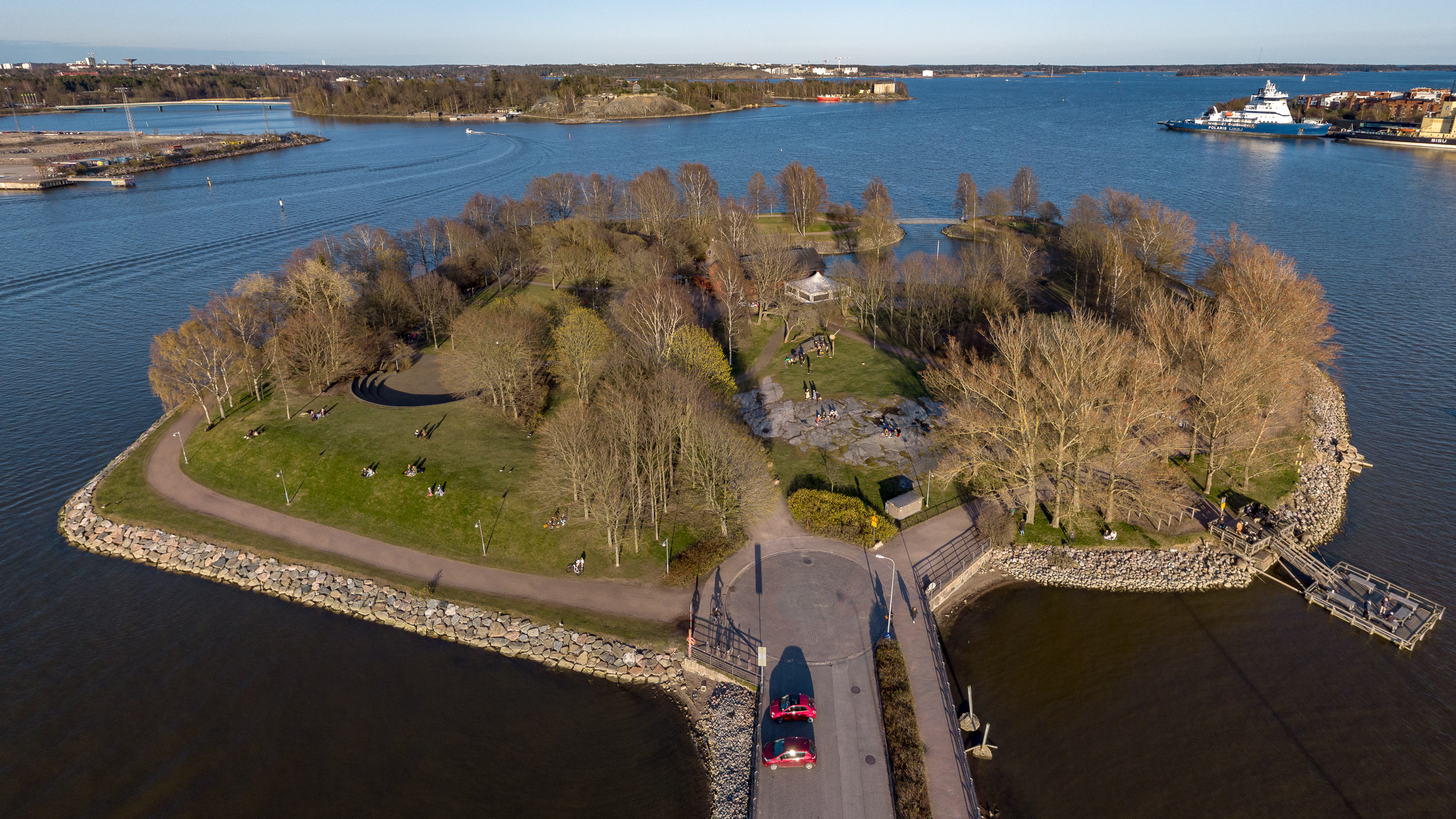
Tervasaari in spring 2020.

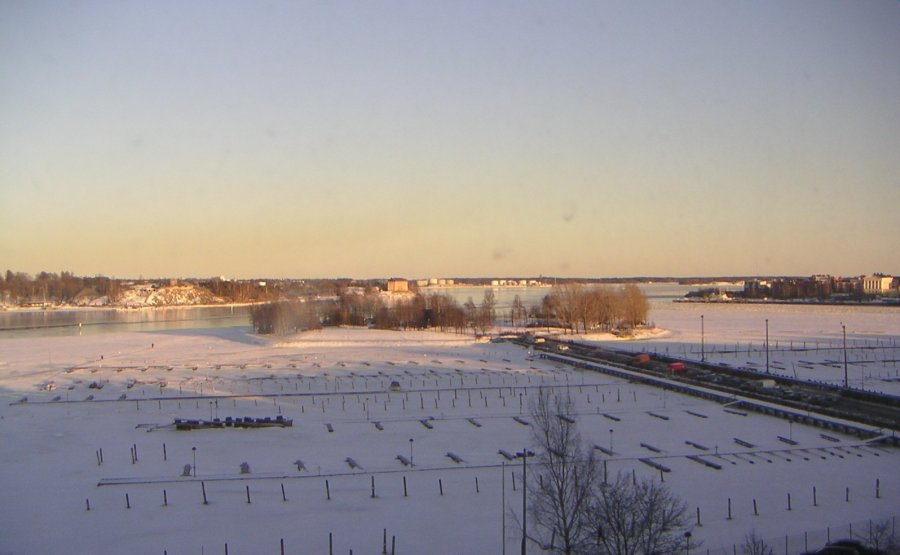
Tervasaari in winter 2005. To the left is Korkeasaari, in the background is Hylkysaari and to the right is Katajanokka.

Tervasaari (Finnish: [ˈterʋɑˌsɑːri]; Swedish: Tjärholmen), meaning "tar island", is an island in Helsinki, Finland, in front of the district of Kruununhaka. Tervasaari is connected to the mainland by a long causeway called Tervasaarenkannas. The causeway is connected to the Pohjoisranta street on the eastern edge of the city centre.

Facilities on the island include a granary restaurant, a children's play park, an area for dogs with a dog swimming place, an event venue and a pier for washing mats. Tervasaari was renovated into a functional island in the 1990s.

== History ==
Tervasaari got its name from a storage used by tar merchants, located on the island. The island appeared on maps in the 1640s as Tiäruholmen. The name Tervasaari was established in the late 19th century.

In 1804 Tervasaari was leased as a plank storage to plank merchant Petter Heidenstrauch. In 1805 Heidenstrauch built a tar granary on the island. This granary is the only building on the island to survive to this day. The granaries were located in Tervasaari because of risk of fire.

At the time, houses in cities were made of wood and topped with flammable materials such as shingles, birch bark or peat, and hay and firewood were stored in the yards. The fire-fighting equipment at the time was also inefficient. Because of these reasons the risk of fire was great. For example Helsinki was almost completely destroyed in a fire that started on 17 November 1808.

During the wars Tervasaari hosted an anti-aircraft gun and the granary was used as an outpost for its crew. In 1939 the Tervasaarenkannas causeway was built to connect Tervasaari to Pohjoisranta. When a permanent connection to the island had been established, the city began using the island as a storage. A tall plank fence was built around the island. In wintertime Tervasaari acted as a dumping ground for excess snow.

In 1970 Tervasaari was fully opened to the public. At the time the last functioning cement foundry on the island moved away. Tervasaari was expanded by land reclamation. During the last renovation in 1995 the artificial pond on the island was filled up.

== Use ==
After storing tar, the island has been used in many ways. In 1967 restaurant Tervasaaren Aitta was opened in the granary on the island. Restaurateurs on the island have included Oy Primula Ab, Leila Orpana's Pirkkis Ky and Wolfgang Wiegand, owner of restaurant Zinnkeller. Since 2007 the current restaurateur is A&S Ravintolat operating under the name of restaurant Savu.

After the renovations in the 1990s Tervasaari has become a park in the city of Helsinki containing a children's play park and an area for dogs. The Tervasaarenkannas causeway hosts the marina of the Helsinki Motorboat Club with docking places for outsider boats. Tervasaari also has an event venue with an inclined auditorium. The amphitheatre hosts two professional theatres every year: HIT Helsinki holds plays for the whole family, and Teatteri Helsinki founded in 2005 holds plays for adults.

== Gallery ==
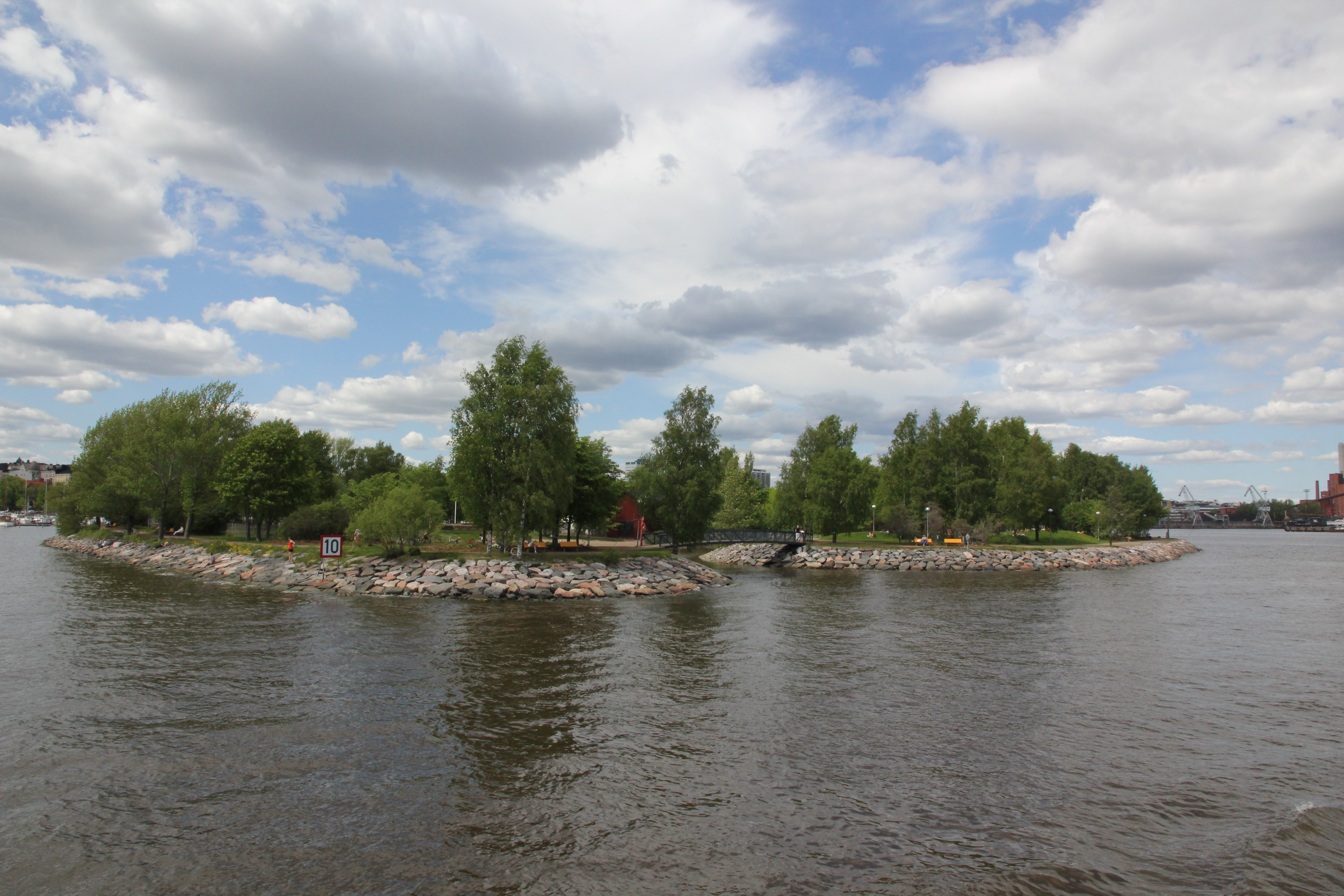
Tervasaari in 2012.

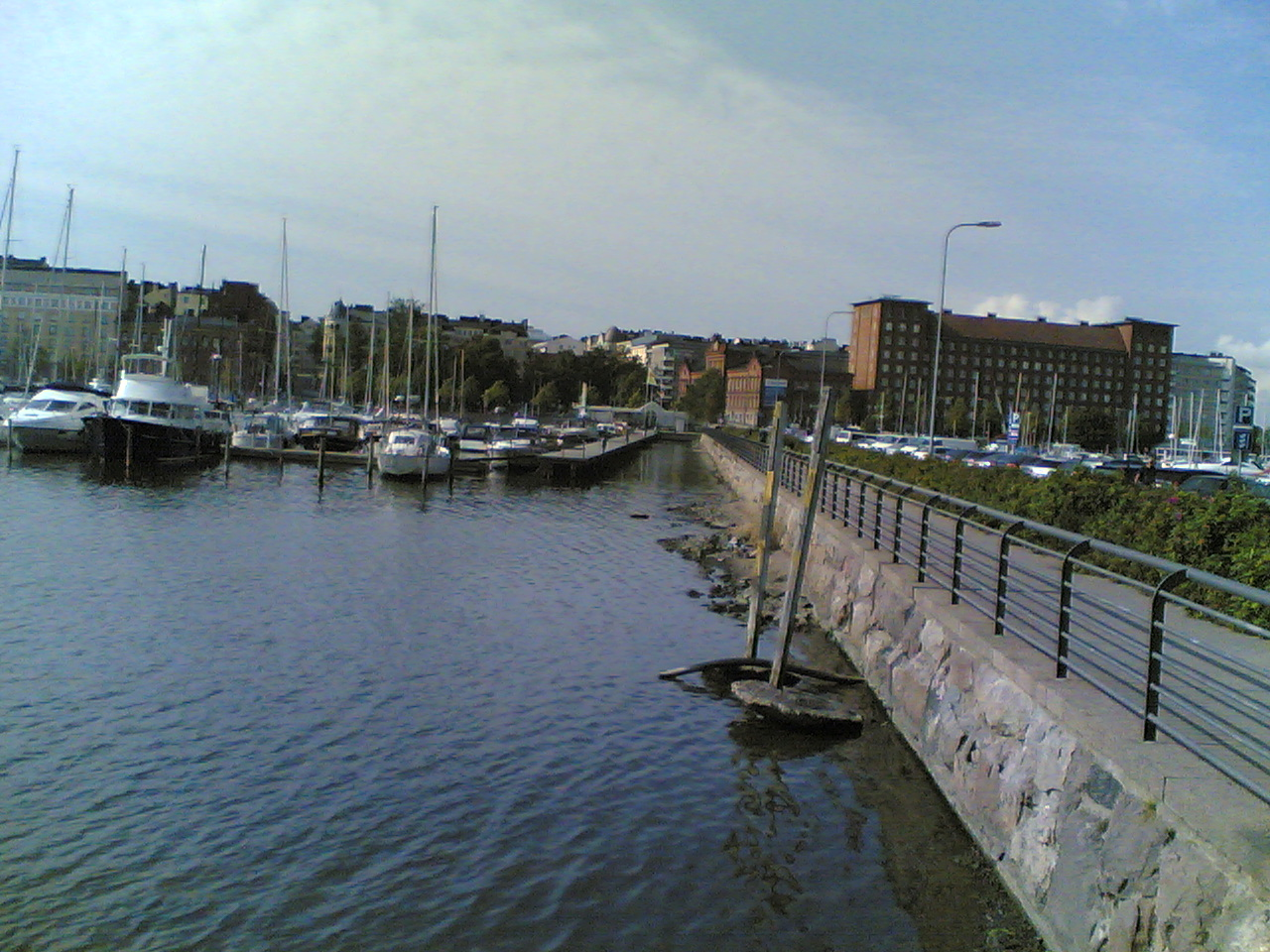
The Tervasaarenkannas causeway connects the island to the mainland.

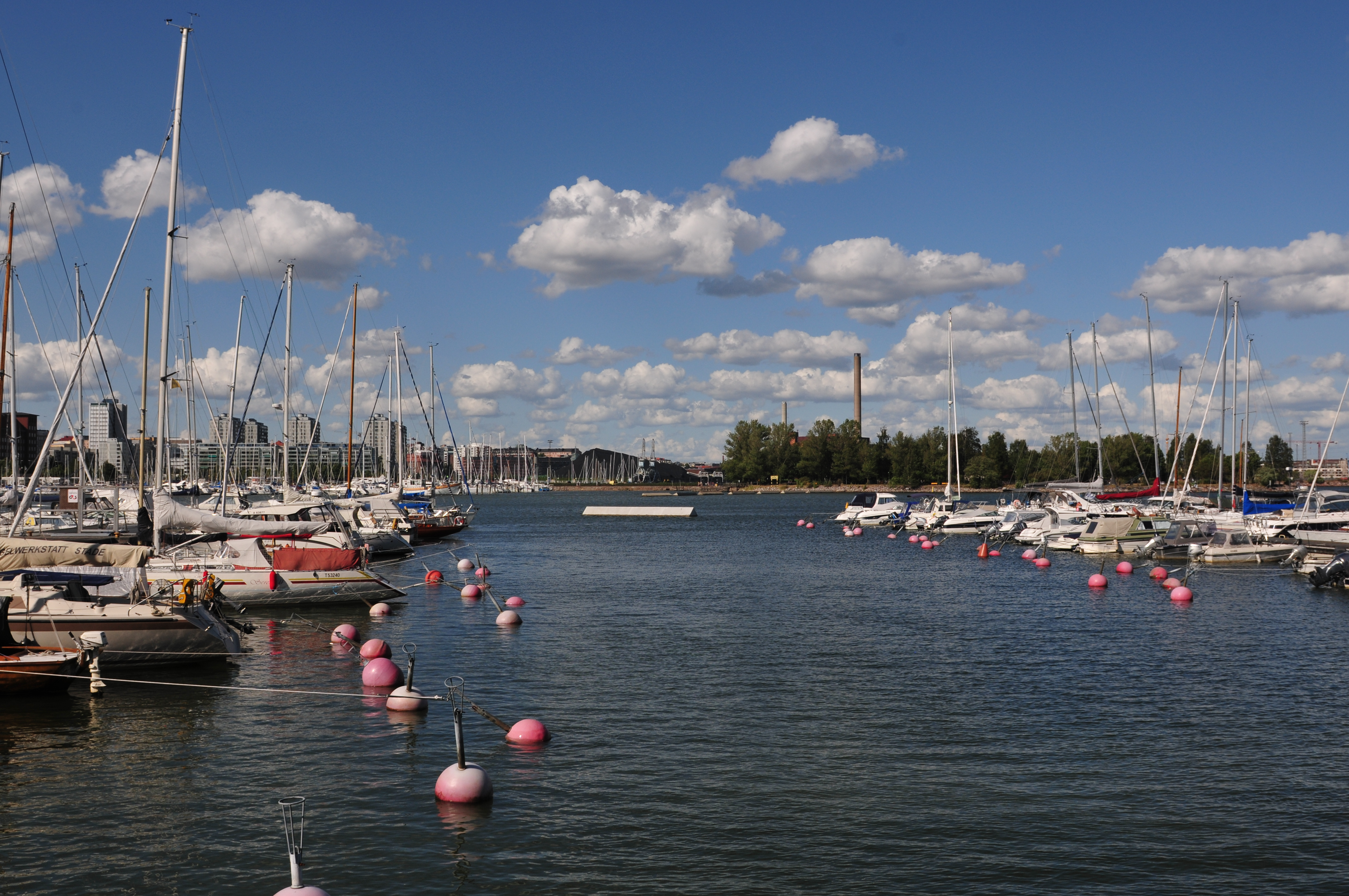
There is a boat harbour for guest boats along Pohjoisranta in front of the island.

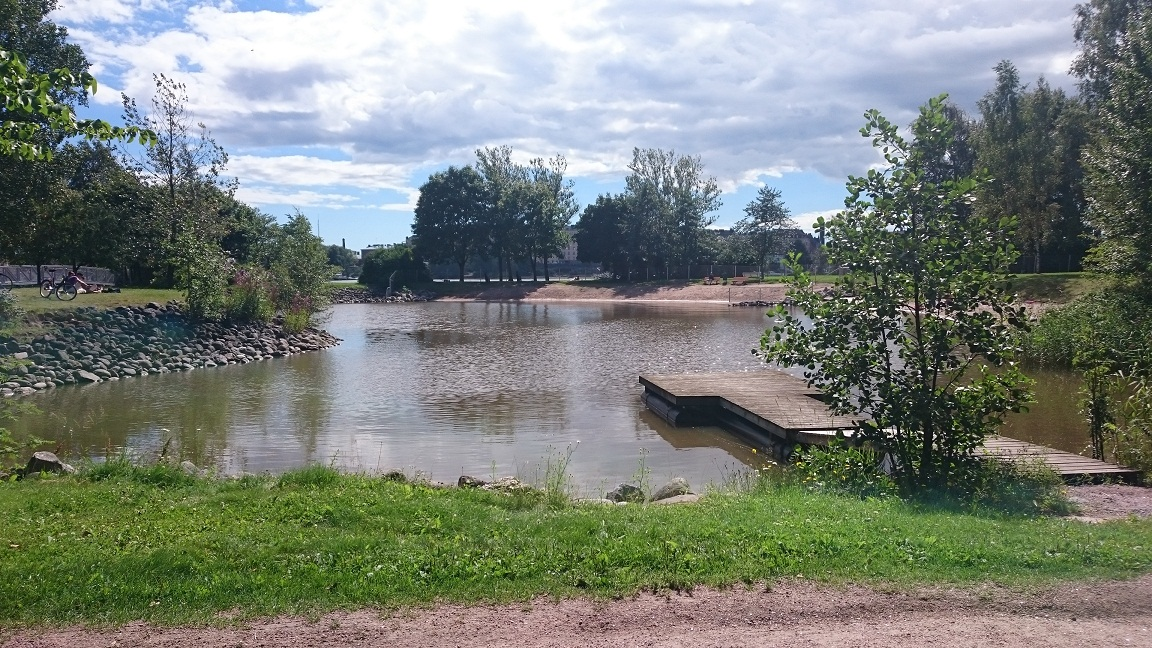
The dog area with its swimming place in July 2016.

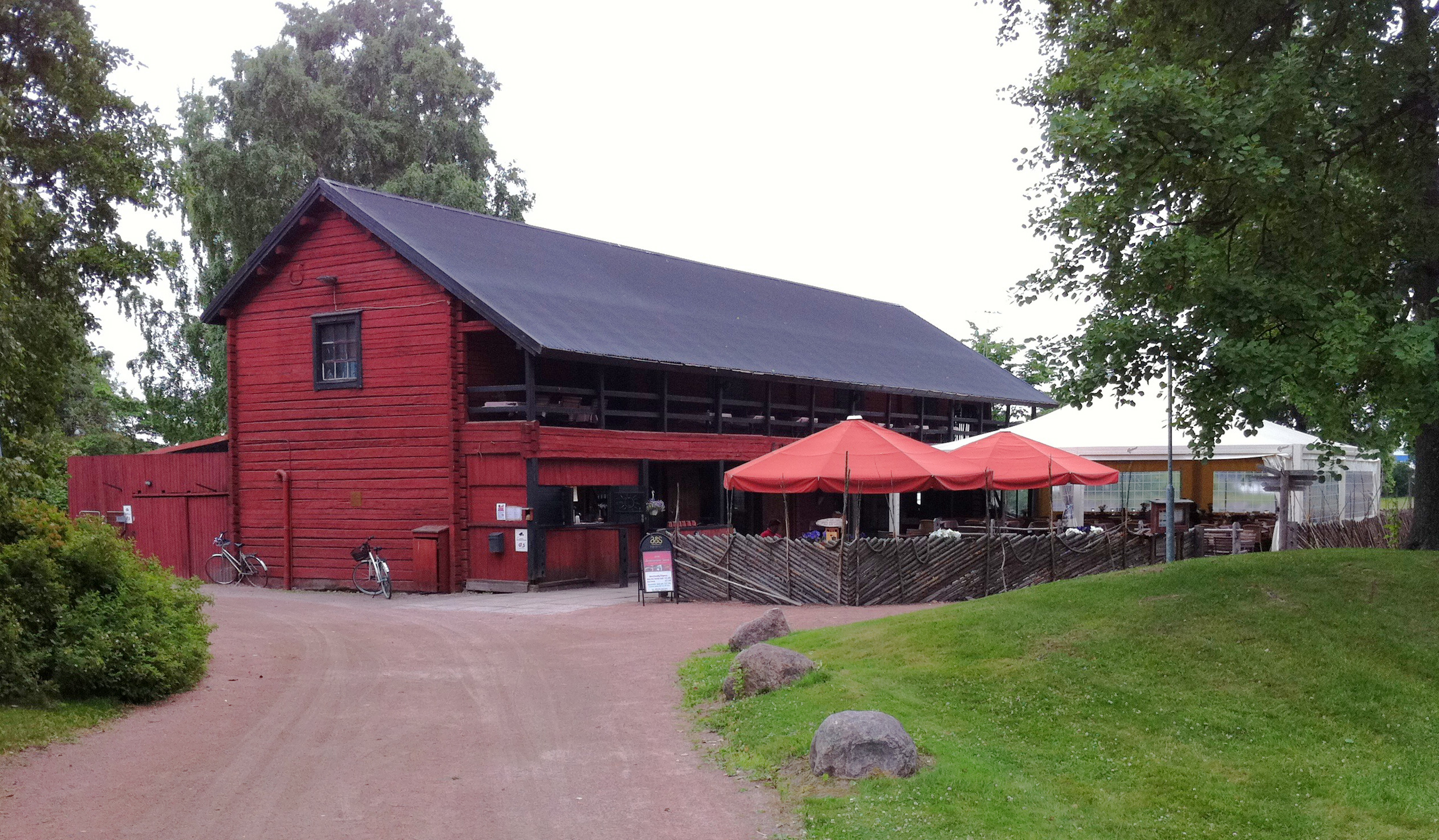
Restaurant Savu.

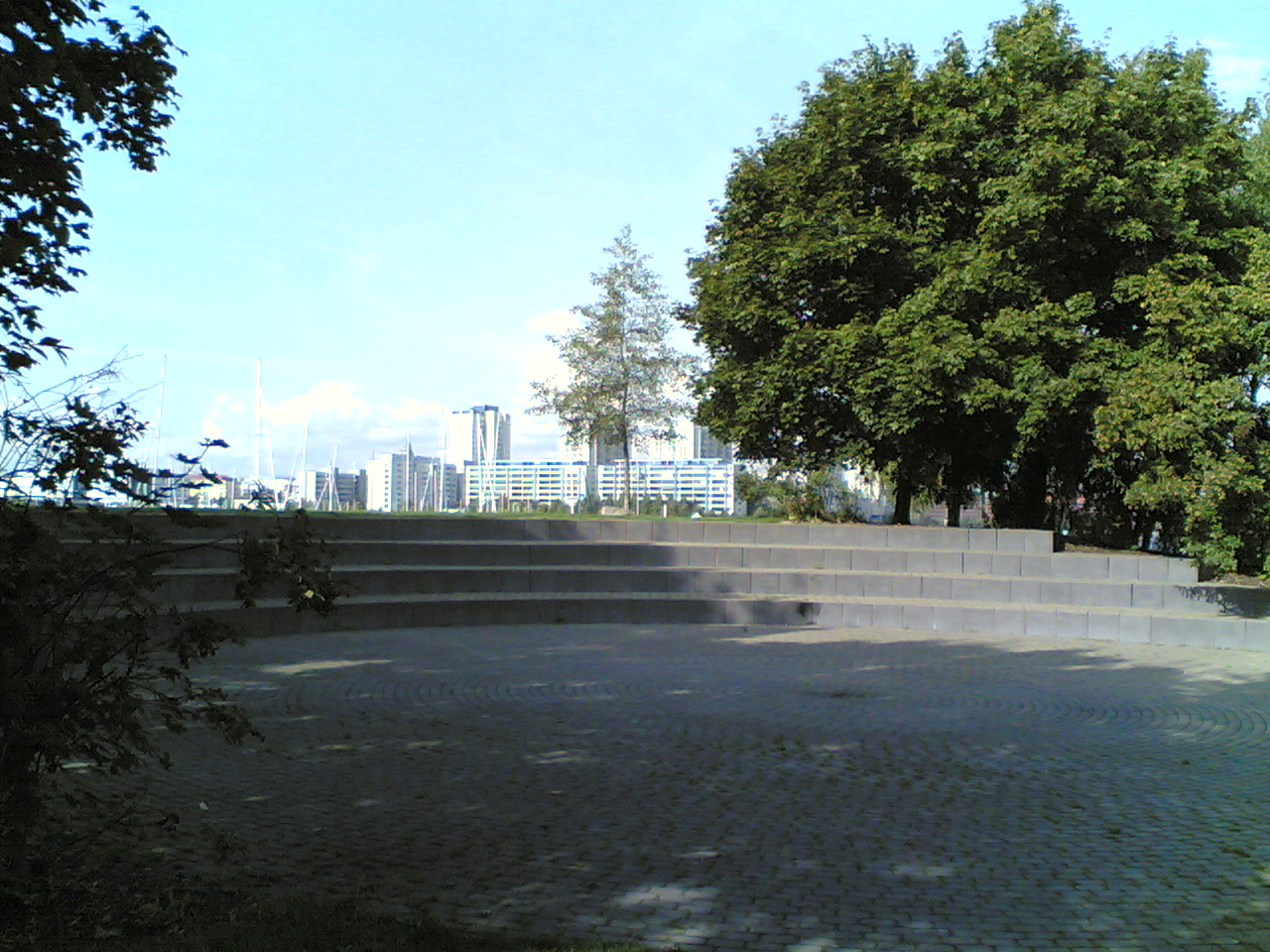
The Tervasaari amphitheatre.
