= Pohjoisranta =

Street in Helsinki, Finland

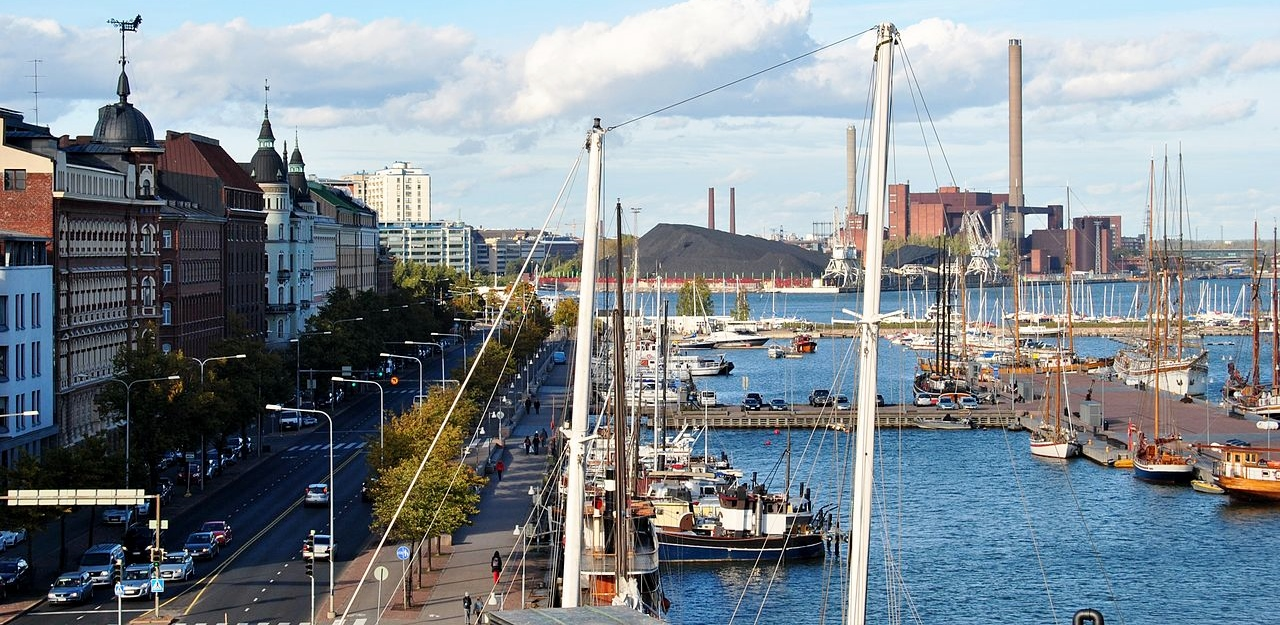
A view of Pohjoisranta.

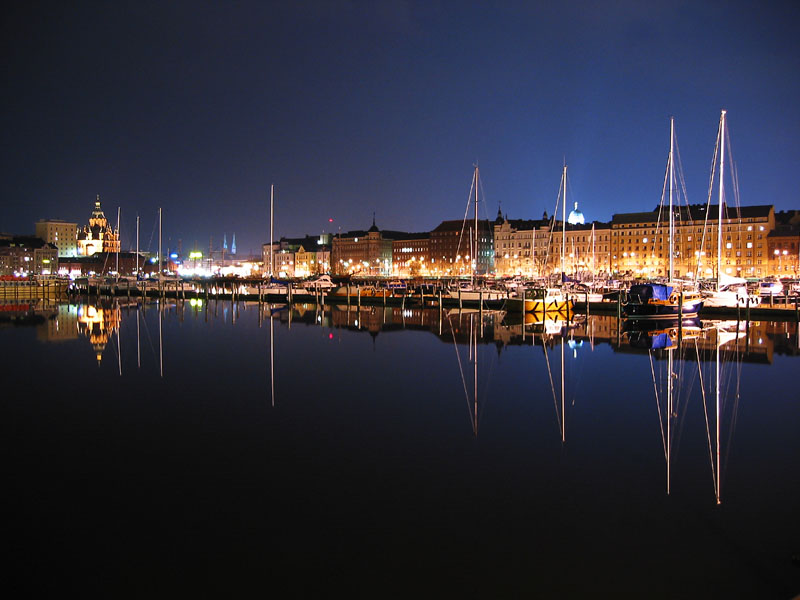
Pohjoisranta at night.

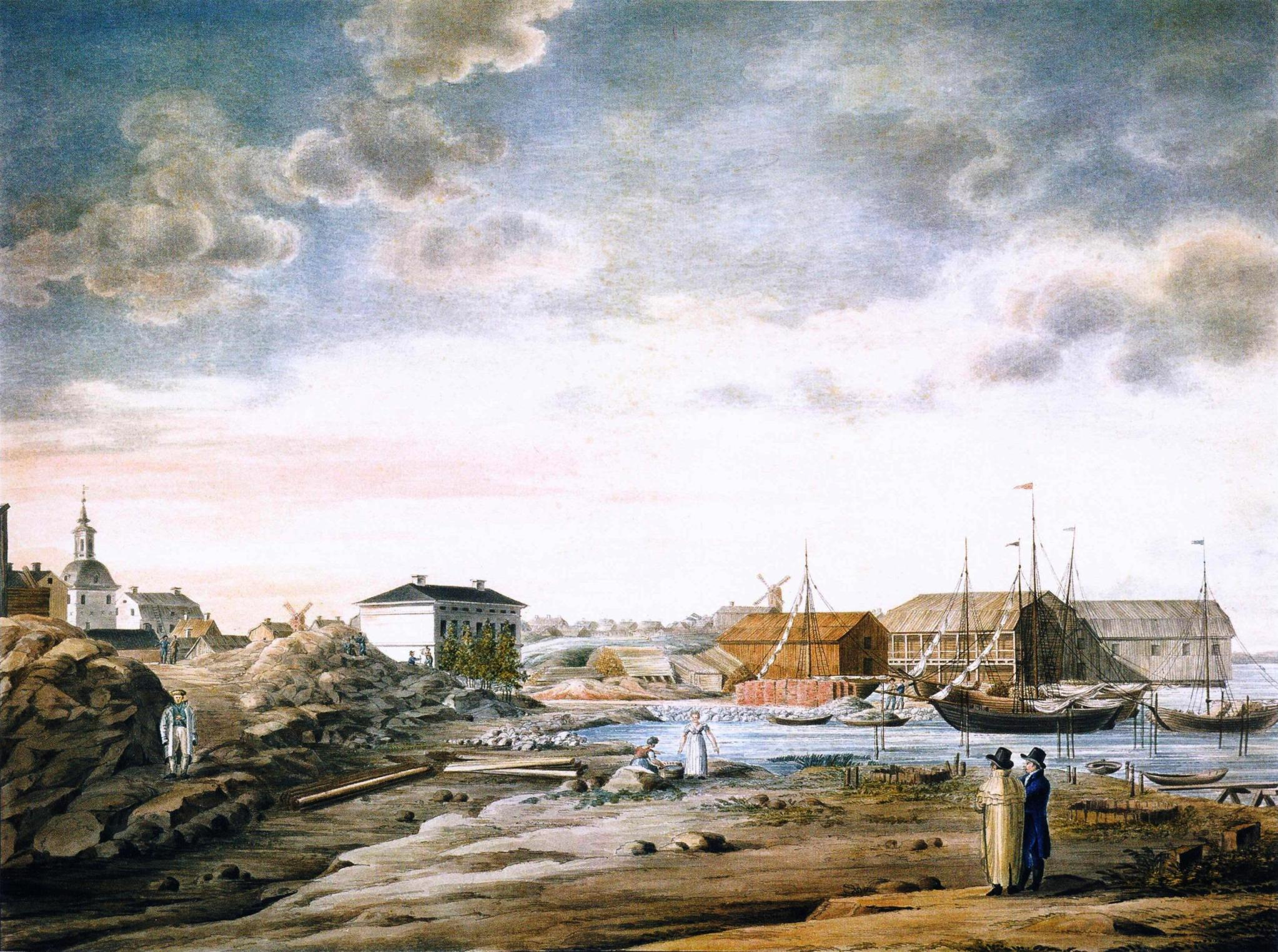
A watercolour painting of the North Harbour by Carl Ludvig Engel in 1816. In the centre is the old customs office of Helsinki.

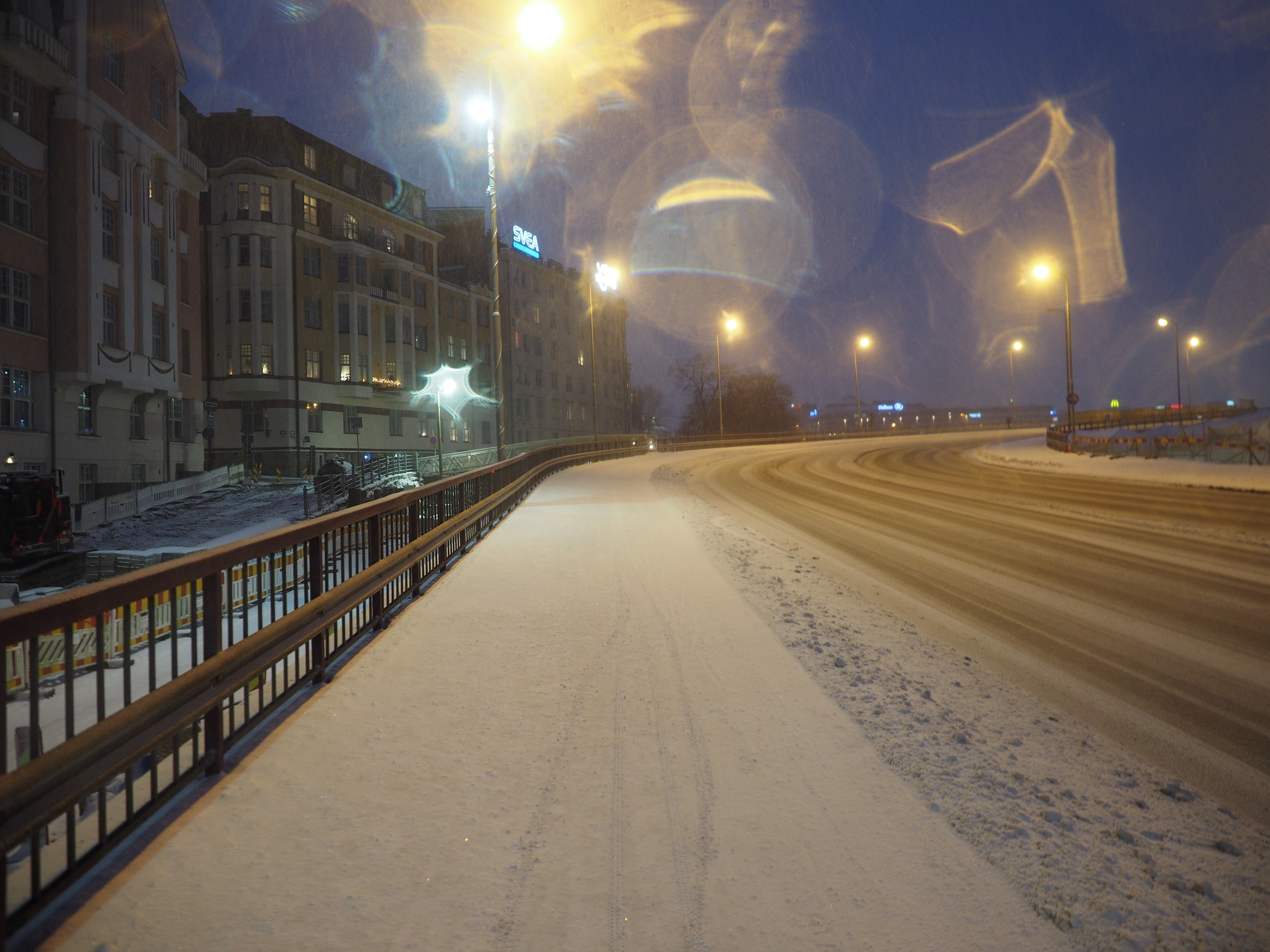
Pohjoisranta in winter.

Pohjoisranta (Swedish: Norra Kajen), meaning "northern shore", is the eastern shore of the district of Kruununhaka in Helsinki, Finland and a street running along it.

== Description and history ==
Pohjoisranta is known for the Halkolaituri (Vedkajen, "firewood pier") pier which nowadays serves as a home for historical wooden ships. The pier got its name when the entire Pohjoisranta pier still was an import harbour for wood. The entire port of Helsinki was located in Pohjoisranta in the 17th and 18th centuries. Pohjoisranta also has a causeway connection to the outdoor island of Tervasaari. Pohjoisranta is surrounded by valuable buildings designed by Onni Tarjanne, Lars Sonck and Theodor Höijer.

After the Hakaniemi bridge leading from Pohjoisranta to Sörnäisten rantatie was built in 1961 Pohjoisranta became an important traffic connection. Together with Esplanadi and Sörnäisten rantatie it forms a part of the connection from the city centre to the Lahdenväylä and Itäväylä highways, also forming part of the Finnish national road 4 and 7 as well as the E-road E75. The street also serves as the main connection to the South Harbour and the Olympia Terminal. The Pohjoisranta street is trafficked by about 29 thousand vehicles per day.

In the early 1990s the street was widened by land reclamation, creating a wide foot and bicycle traffic way right at the coastline. Nowadays the proper traffic way is at the centre of the street while a separate traffic way is located at its western edge separated by a row of trees, use of which is only allowed for traffic leading to the buildings on the edge of the street and their parking lots.

== Buildings ==
- Pohjoisranta 4 (Standertsköld house): Built in 1885, designed by Theodor Höijer. Represents Renaissance Revival architecture.
- Pohjoisranta 6 (Bäck house): Built in 1882, designed by Theodor Höijer. Facade is made of red brick.
- Pohjoisranta 8: Built in 1926, designed by architect David Frölander-Ulf. Represents Nordic Classicism.
- Pohjoisranta 10: Built in 1910, facade designed by Lars Sonck and building plan by Onni Tarjanne. Represents Art Nouveau.
- Pohjoisranta 12 (Donner house): Built in 1899, designed by Magnus Schjerfbeck based on sketches by Sebastian Gripenberg. Represents Renaissance Revival architecture. Serves as the home of the Donner family.
- Pohjoisranta 14-16: Built in 1927, designed by master builder Toivo Pajunen. Represents Nordic Classicism.
- Pohjoisranta 18: Built in 1885, designed by architect Albert Mellin. Represents Renaissance Revival architecture.
- Pohjoisranta 20 (Kiholinna): Built in 1929, designed by architect Kalle Lehtovuori. Originally built as a dormitory for military officers.

== Sources ==
- Helsingin Sanomat: Kertomuksia keskustan kortteleista, part 15
- Korttelit.fi
