= Zinnkeller =

Restaurant in Finland

Coordinates: 60°10′27.7″N 24°57′30.4″E

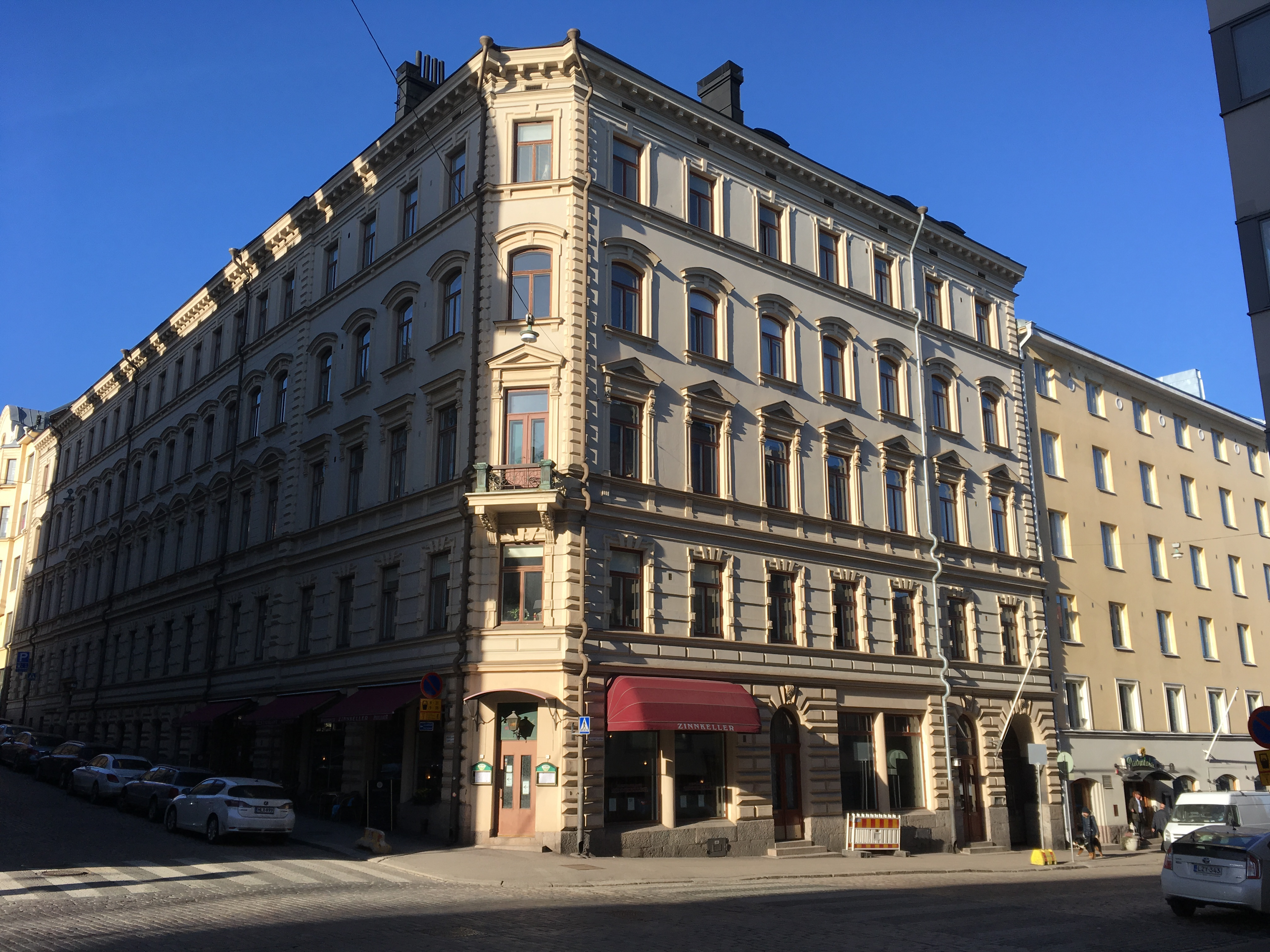
Restaurant Zinnkeller in the corner of Liisankatu and Meritullinkatu.

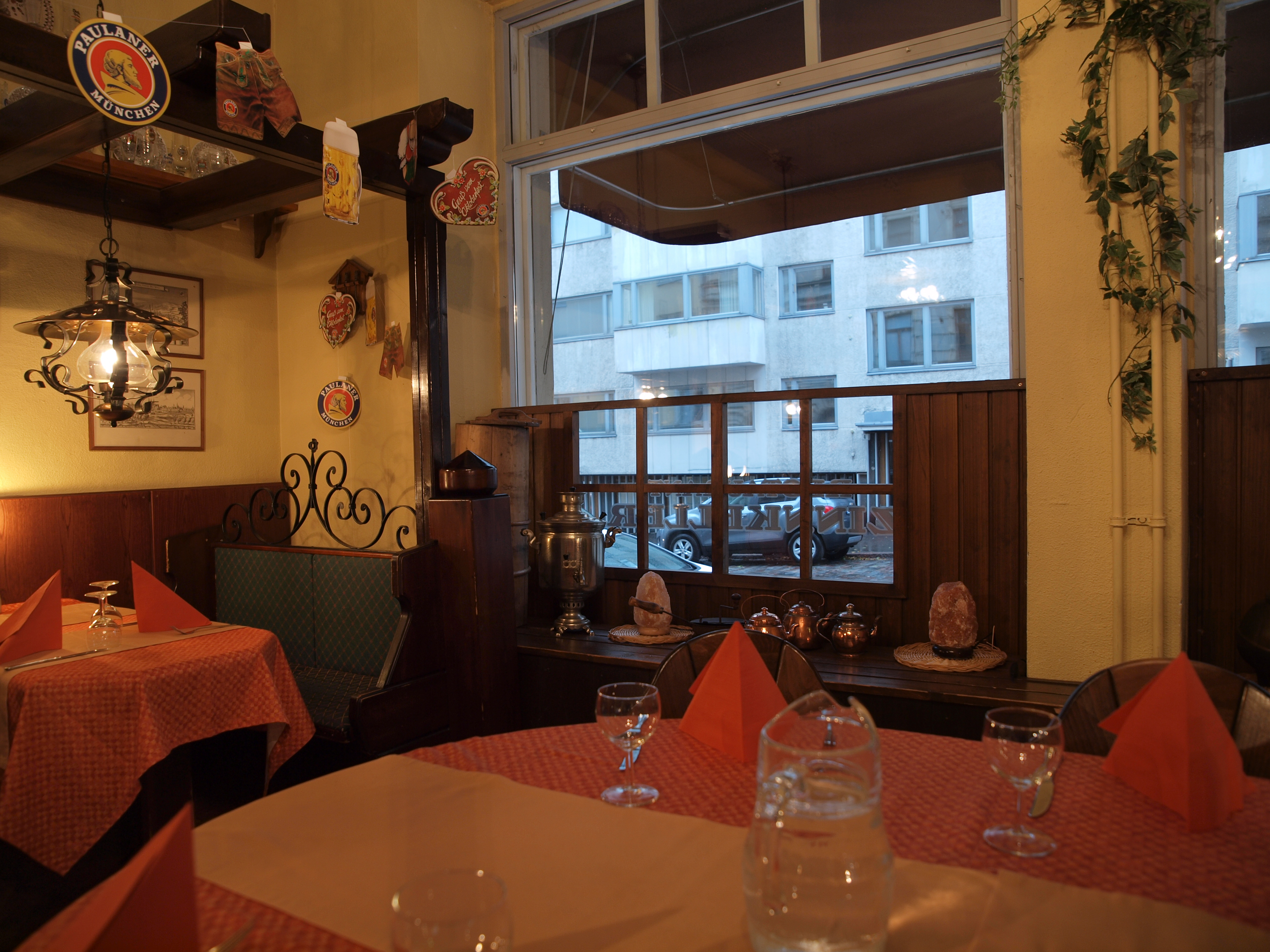
Interior of the restaurant (2015).

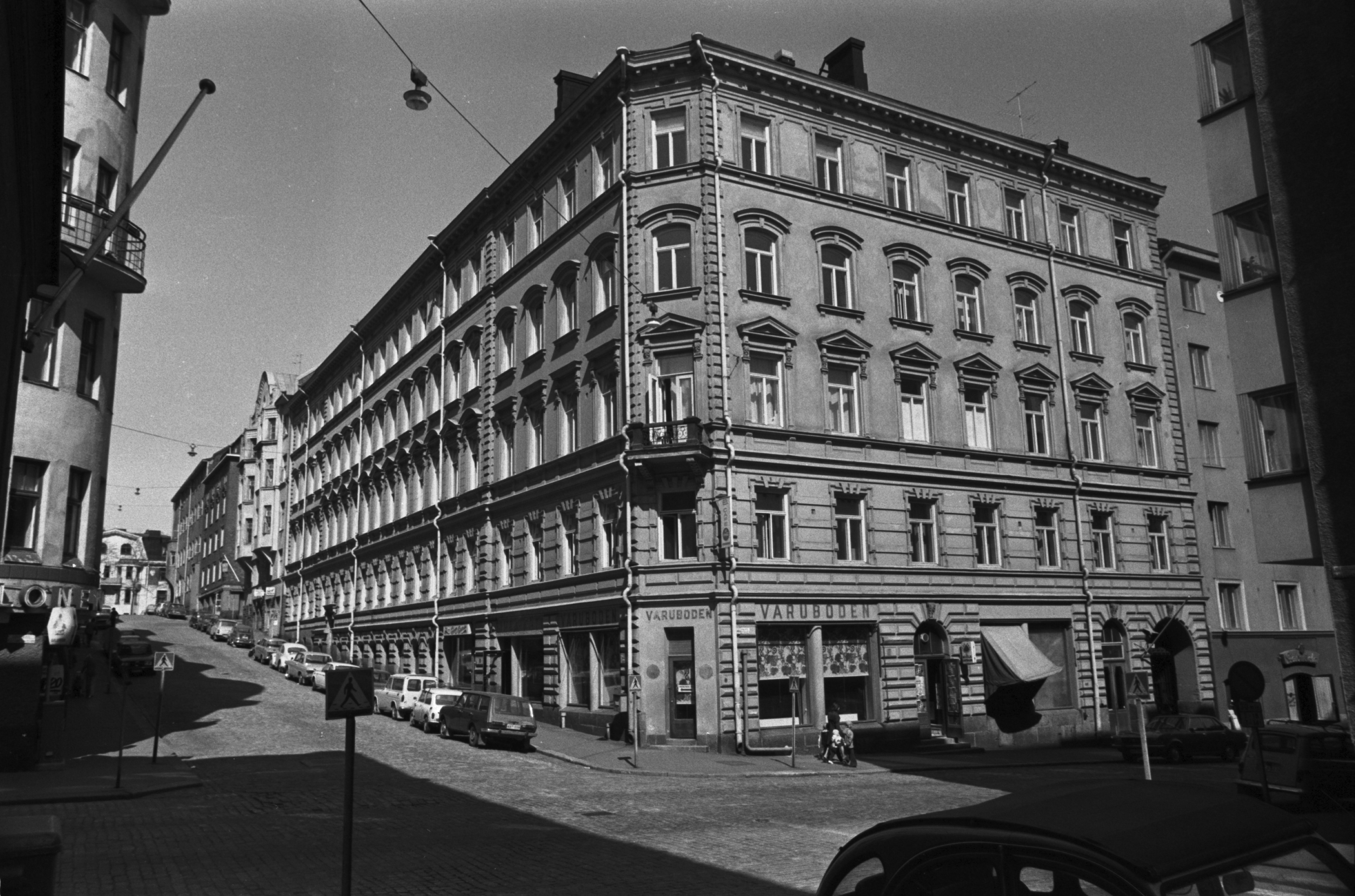
Liisankatu 7 before restaurant Zinnkeller was founded.

Zinnkeller is a German restaurant in Kruununhaka, Helsinki, Finland. It was founded by chef Wolfgang Wiegand in 1980. In autumn 2016 ownership of the restaurant was transferred to Wolfgang Wiegand's daughter Nina Wiegand, who had been working at the restaurant since 1996. Nina Wiegand was educated as a kindergarten teacher.

Zinnkeller is located in a house built in 1895 at the corner of the streets Liisankatu and Meritullinkatu, designed by J. Rosenberg. The dishes in the restaurant come from such places as Berlin, Schleswig-Holstein, Hamburg, Baden-Württemberg and Schwarzwald. Part of the ingredients in the kitchen as well as all the wines and beers come from Germany.

As well as the asparagus weeks, the restaurant features Martin's goose and Spanferkel, a whole grilled pig. Annual themes include Oktoberfest held in autumn.
