= Main Guard Post, Helsinki =

Guard post building in Helsinki, Finland

Coordinates: 60°10′8.36″N 24°57′27.44″E

Main Guard Post
- Päävartio (Finnish)
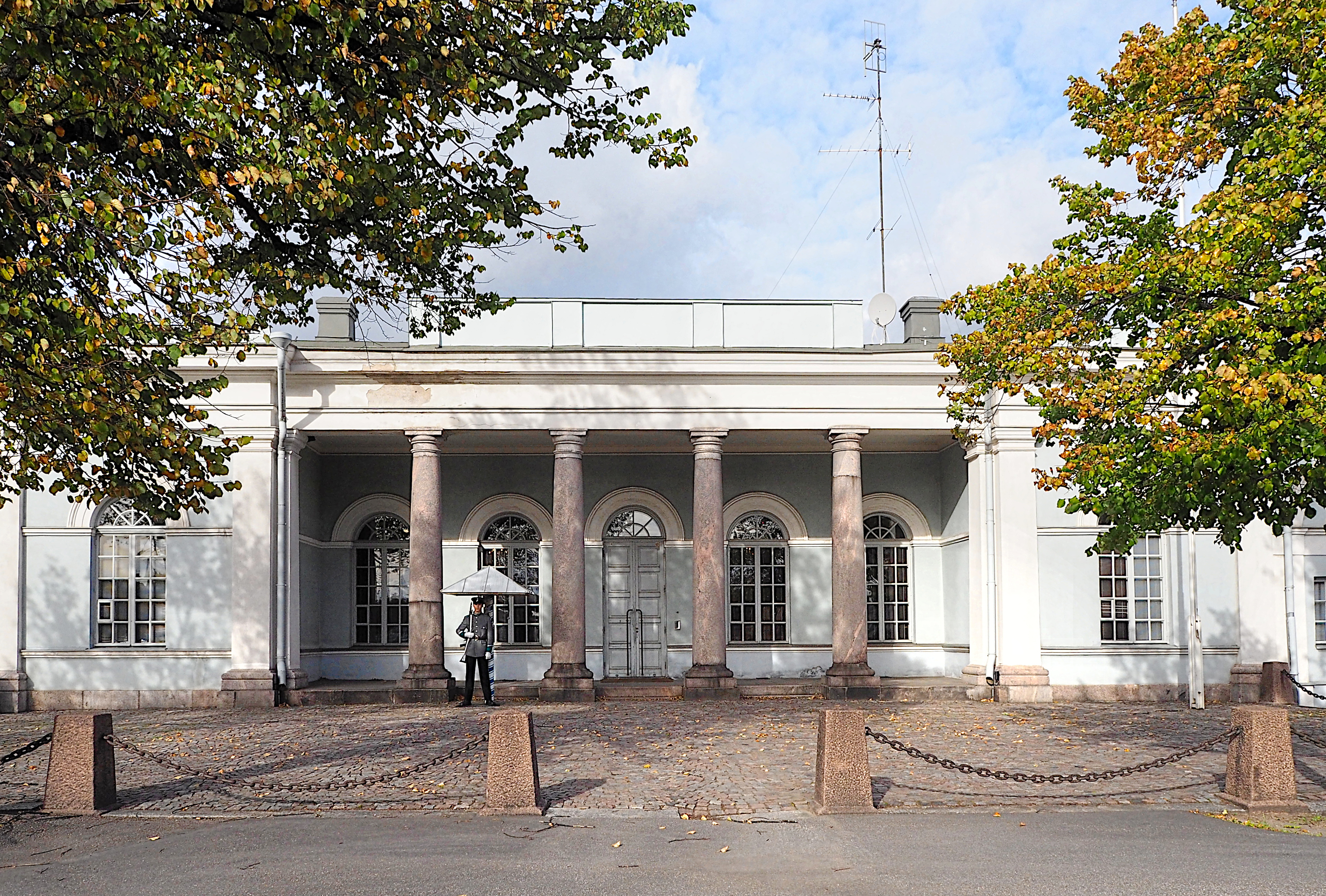
- The Main Guard Post in September 2019.
- Interactive map of Main Guard Post
- Location: Helsinki, Finland

The Main Guard Post (Finnish: Päävartio) is a guard post building and a city block in the district of Kruununhaka in Helsinki, Finland, in connection with the Presidential Palace at Mariankatu 1. The buildings in the block mostly date from 1843. As well as the guard post building, the block includes the financial building of the Presidential building, containing offices, maintenance spaces, garages and apartments. The building is most often cited as designed by Carl Ludvig Engel, but sometimes by Eduard von Anert.

From 1820 to 1840 the Main Guard Post was located at the base of the Helsinki Cathedral. This former Main Guard Post building was dismantled in 1836 as it was seen that detaining prisoners, the main purpose of the Main Guard Post, was not something fit near a church.

When the Heidenstrauch house was renovated into the Imperial Palace (and later into the Presidential Palace) in 1843, the Main Guard Post was also moved in connection with it. Historically, the Main Guard Post has been the central guard post of the Helsinki garrison, acting as a post to guard the most important military targets, military behaviour and the overall situation of military targets. It has also been used to detain soldiers detained because of, for example, absence without leave or consumption of alcohol.

Both the main guard post and the financial building remain in almost their original use to this day. The main guard post hosts offices for the Helsinki garrison. The disused prison cells now serve as break rooms for the guards.

The most visible part of the Main Guard Post is the guard in front of its main entrance. Enlisted men serving as guards are selected from the military police serving in the Guard Jaeger Regiment. The guard is present at the entrance from 07:45 in the morning to 22:00 in the evening and one guard shift lasts an hour at the most, only 20 minutes in cold winter weather. During their shift, guards must stand absolutely still. Some guards have felt dizzy or even fainted during their shift. The guards carry assault rifles on their backs but these have been disabled so that they can not be actually fired. This is because of safety reasons: if someone were to steal a guard's rifle, they could not use it to fire.

During the Finnish Civil War, the Main Guard Post was one of the last bastions of the Reds in Helsinki. In 1918 the building was also used to retain political prisoners. A metal disc attached to the door of a prison cell signified the background of the prisoner: a red disc meant a political prisoner, a blue disc meant a criminal.

The building is listed on the Finnish Building Heritage Register.
