= Kruununhaka =

Coordinates: 60°10′20″N 024°57′23″E

Kruununhaka Kronohagen
- Helsinki Subdivision
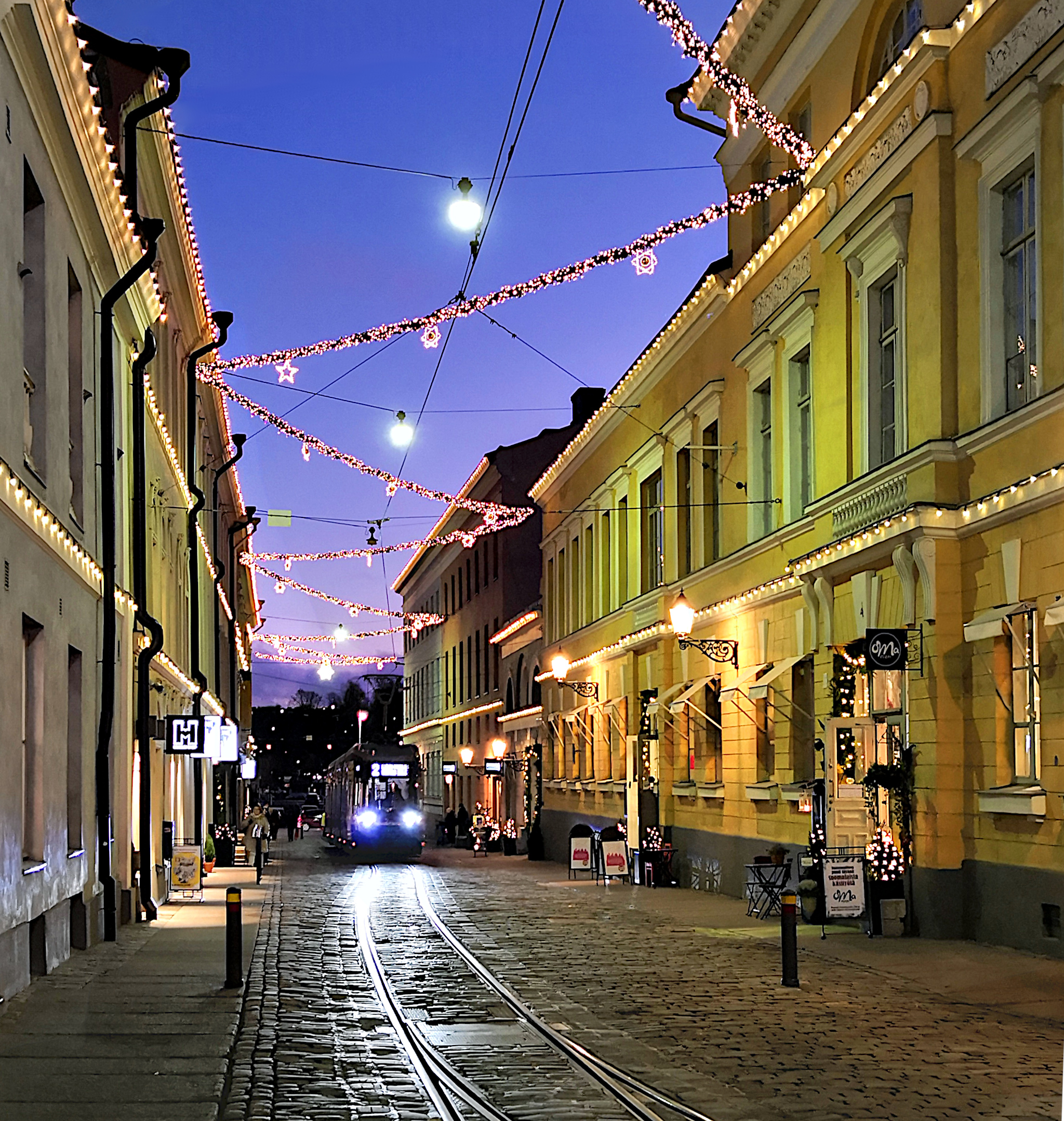
- Katariinankatu street at Christmas time in Kruununhaka

- Position of Kruununhaka within Helsinki
- Country: Finland
- Region: Uusimaa
- Sub-region: Greater Helsinki
- Municipality: Helsinki
- District: Southern
- Subdivision regions: none
- Area: 0.57 km^{2} (0.22 sq mi)
- Population (2003): 6,763
  - Density: 11,860/km^{2} (30,700/sq mi)
- Postal codes: 00170
- Subdivision number: 01
- Neighbouring subdivisions: Kluuvi; Katajanokka; Kaartinkaupunki; Kallio; Siltasaari; Sörnäinen

Kruununhaka (Finnish: [ˈkruːnunˌhɑkɑ]; Swedish: Kronohagen, often nicknamed "Krunika", "Krunikka" or "Kruna") is a neighbourhood of Helsinki, the capital of Finland. As of 31 December 2024 there were about 7400 inhabitants in Kruununhaka and as of 31 December 2022 there were about 9100 jobs. Kruununhaka is bordered by the street Unioninkatu to the west and the Pohjoisesplanadi street on the Helsinki Market Square to the south, in other directions it is bordered by water.

The name "Kruununhaka" (literally "pasture of the Crown") comes from a pasture for horses for the artillery of the Crown that used to be located near the current Rauhankatu street. Up to the early 18th century it used to be located slightly outside the city proper, but nowadays almost the entirety of the urban area of Helsinki at the time is said to be included in Kruununhaka.

Kruununhaka became the area next to the harbour and the center, when Helsinki was moved from the earlier location in the mid-1660s. From the very beginning, the residents included city and state officials.

Many buildings of the University of Helsinki are also situated in Kruununhaka. The area has become known for its vintage shops.

A central part of Kruununhaka is the Helsinki Senate Square built in the Empire style as well as the area between the Pohjoisesplanadi and Aleksanterinkatu streets. Kruununhaka is a district of valuable institutions. The Helsinki Cathedral, the main building of the Bank of Finland, the Presidential Palace, the Government Palace, the old Helsinki town hall, the Helsinki City Hall, the House of the Estates, the House of Nobility, the House of Sciences, many famous law bureaus and buildings of the city centre campus of the University of Helsinki are located there. The Sibelius gymnasium school, one of the most famous schools in Finland is located on the Liisankatu street. The eastern shore of Kruununhaka is called Pohjoisranta. Pohjoisranta contains the Pohjoissatama boat pier and a short connection to the refreshment area of Tervasaari.

== History ==
When construction of the Suomenlinna fortress started, the area in the northwest of the Vironniemi peninsula was taken under ownership of the Swedish Crown in 1748. This area, bordered to the south by the current Vironkatu street and in the east two the streets Snellmaninkatu and Unioninkatu, consisted of a pasture and eight fields and was called Brobergshagen (Siltavuorenhaka, literally "bridge-mountain pasture"). Already in the 1750s the name Brobergshagen gave way to a newer name Kronohagen, and in the middle of the 19th century the entire district north of Aleksanterinkatu and east of Snellmaninkatu was called Kronohagen. In a 1866 map the area is shown with a Finnish name Kruununhaka. Historical documents also show the name Gamla Stads Kronohagen ("pasture of the Crown in the old city") in the 1770s and Kronbergshagen in 1805. Kruununhaka-Kronohagen was made the official name of the district in 1959.

== Street names ==
The current street network in Kruununhaka was originally planned in Johan Albrecht Ehrenström's 1812 zoning plan. Only some of the southernmost streets were already present during Swedish rule. The street names also stem from the 1820 and 1830s, and only few streets have been renamed since then. Most of the streets have been named after members of the House of Romanov, and a large part of the names in general are reminiscent of the political atmosphere of the first decades of the Grand Duchy of Finland. The oldest street names still in use are Unioninkatu ("union street") and Liisankatu ("Elizabeth street"), which emperor Alexander I of Russia confirmed when he was visiting Helsinki in 1819.

== Traffic ==
Kruununhaka is served by the daily bus line 16 (Railway Square - Kulosaari - Mustikkamaa). The westernmost and southernmost parts of Kruununhaka are also served by the Helsinki tram line 7 on Liisankatu and Snellmaninkatu, lines 4 and 5 on Aleksanterinkatu and line 2 from the Senate Square. The Kaisaniemenpuisto stop on the western edge of Kruununhaka is also used by many Helsinki city bus lines and tram lines 3, 6 and 9 travelling from the Helsinki Central railway station northeast and north on the street Hämeentie.

== Notable people ==
- Kirka Babitzin, singer
- Harri Holkeri, politician
- Magnus Lindberg, composer
- Johannes Virolainen, politician
- Bror-Erik Wallenius, sports commentator
- Valtteri Bottas, racing driver

== Gallery ==
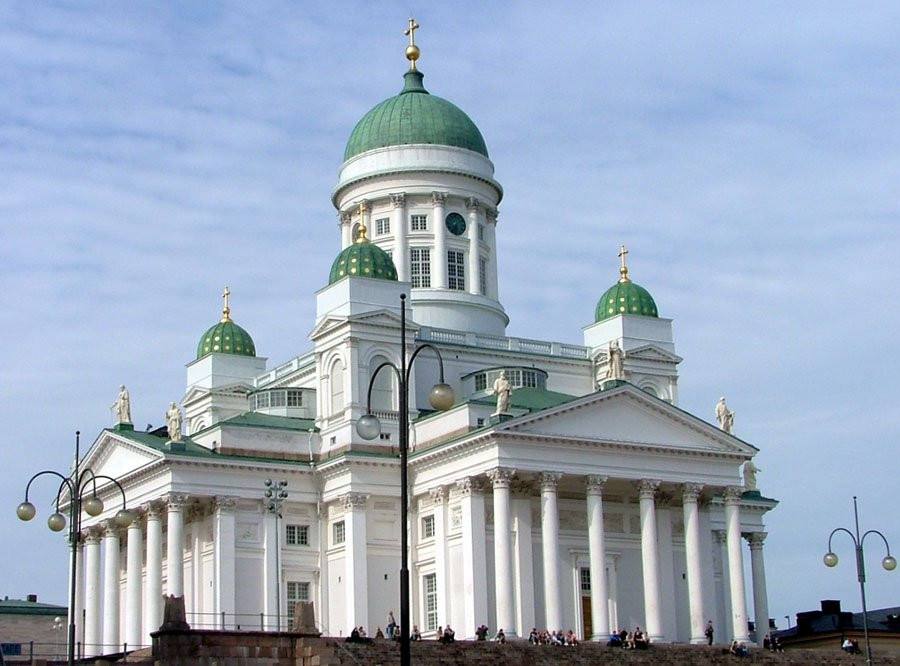
Helsinki Cathedral

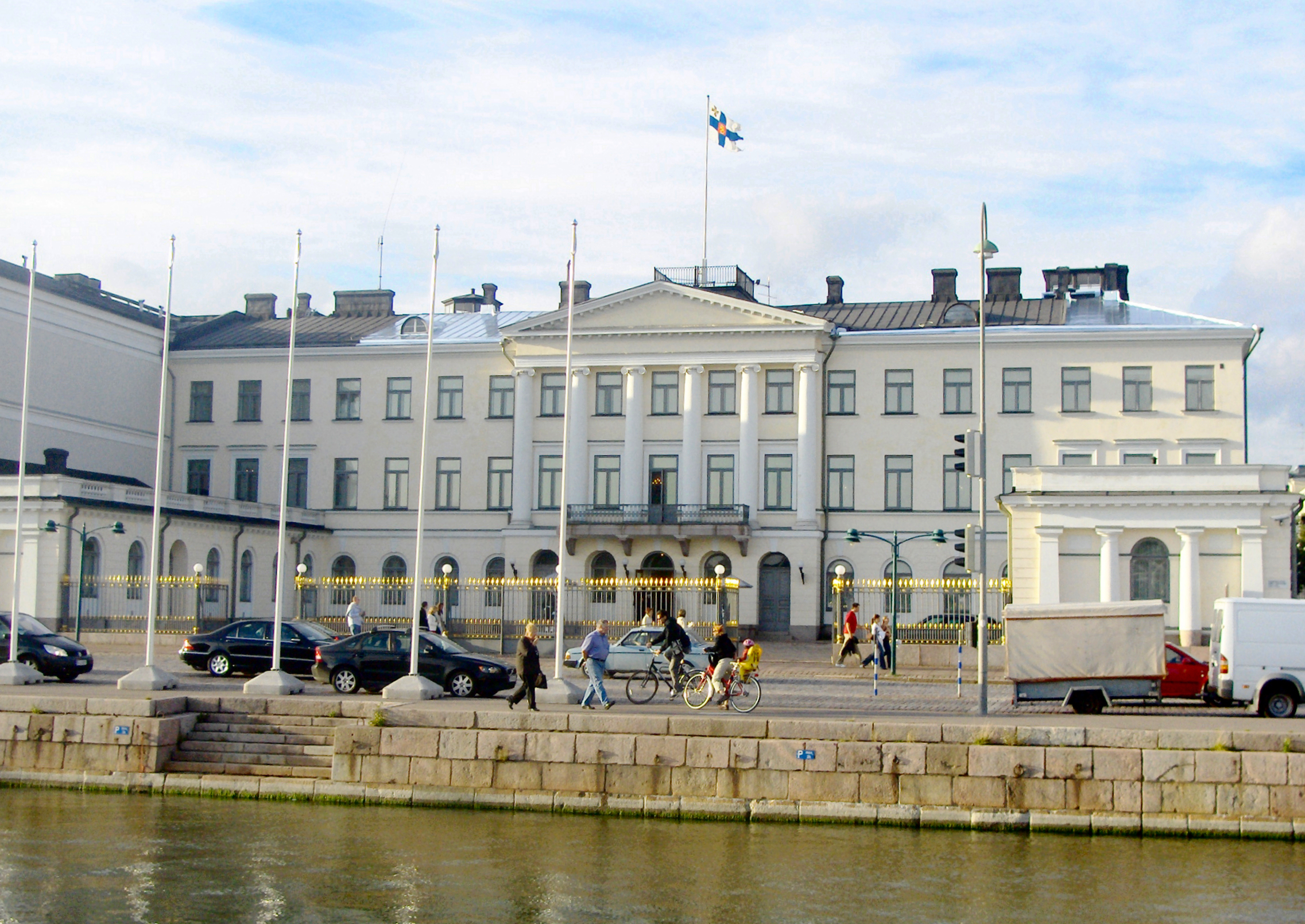
Presidential Palace

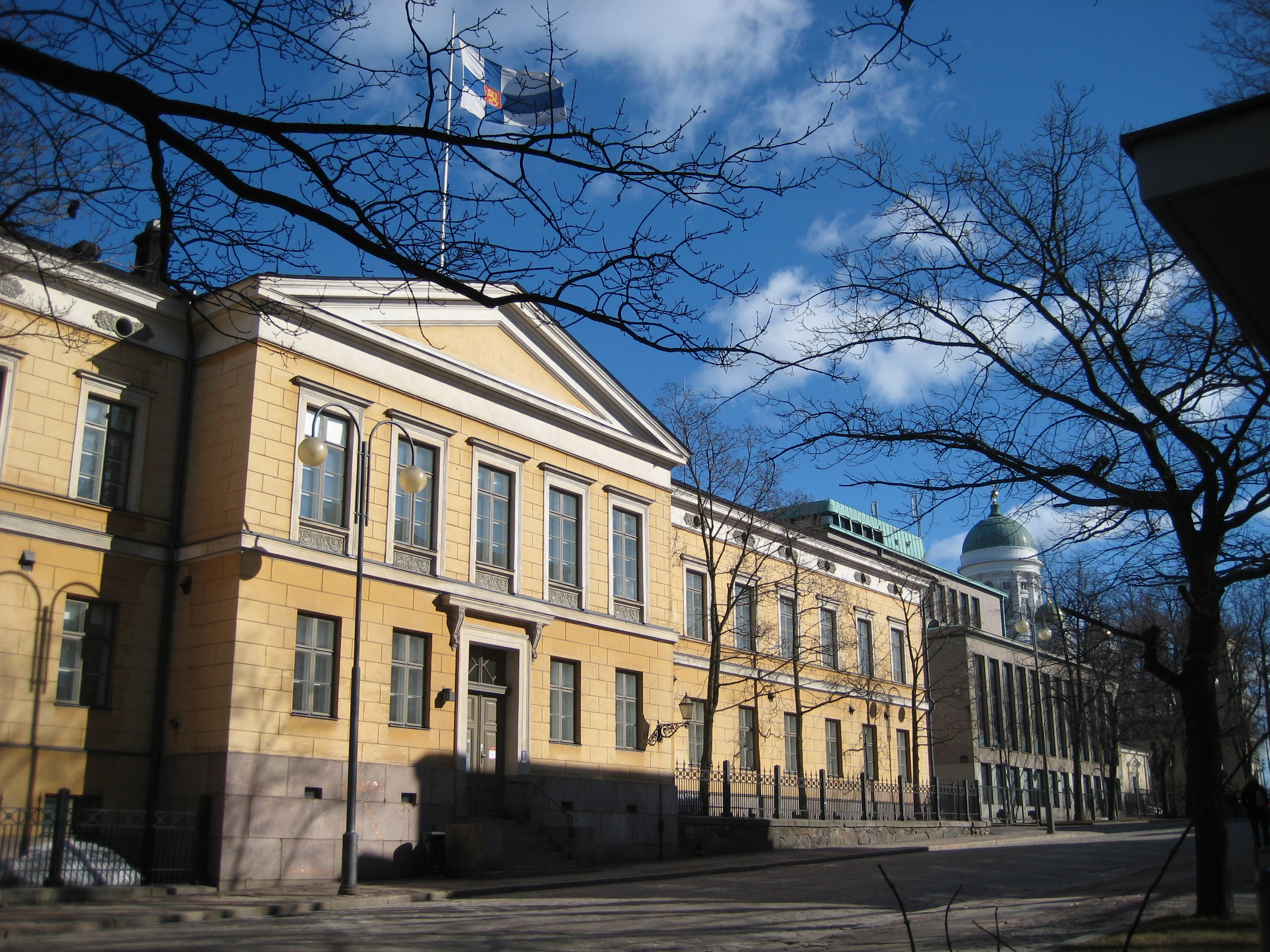
Aleksanteri Institute

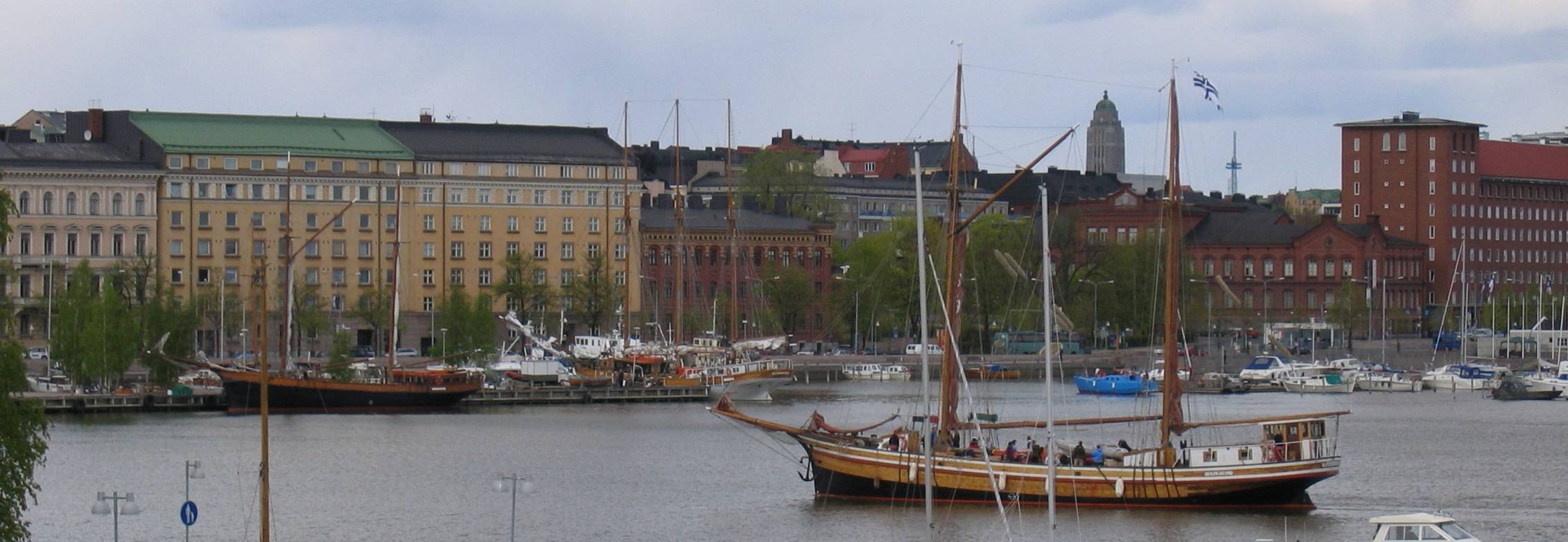
Pohjoisranta waterfront in Kruununhaka as seen from nearby Katajanokka

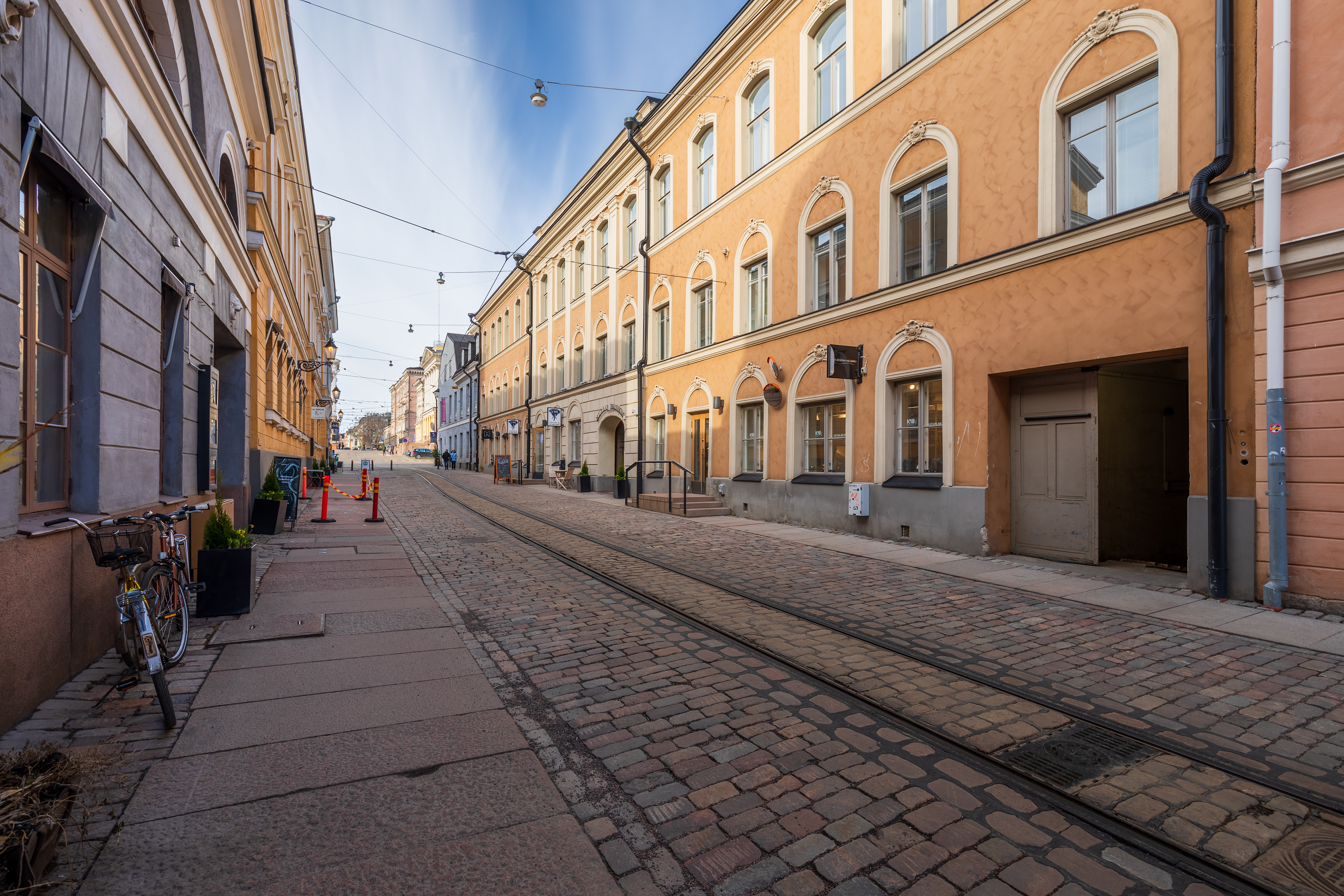
Katariinankatu street in April 2022

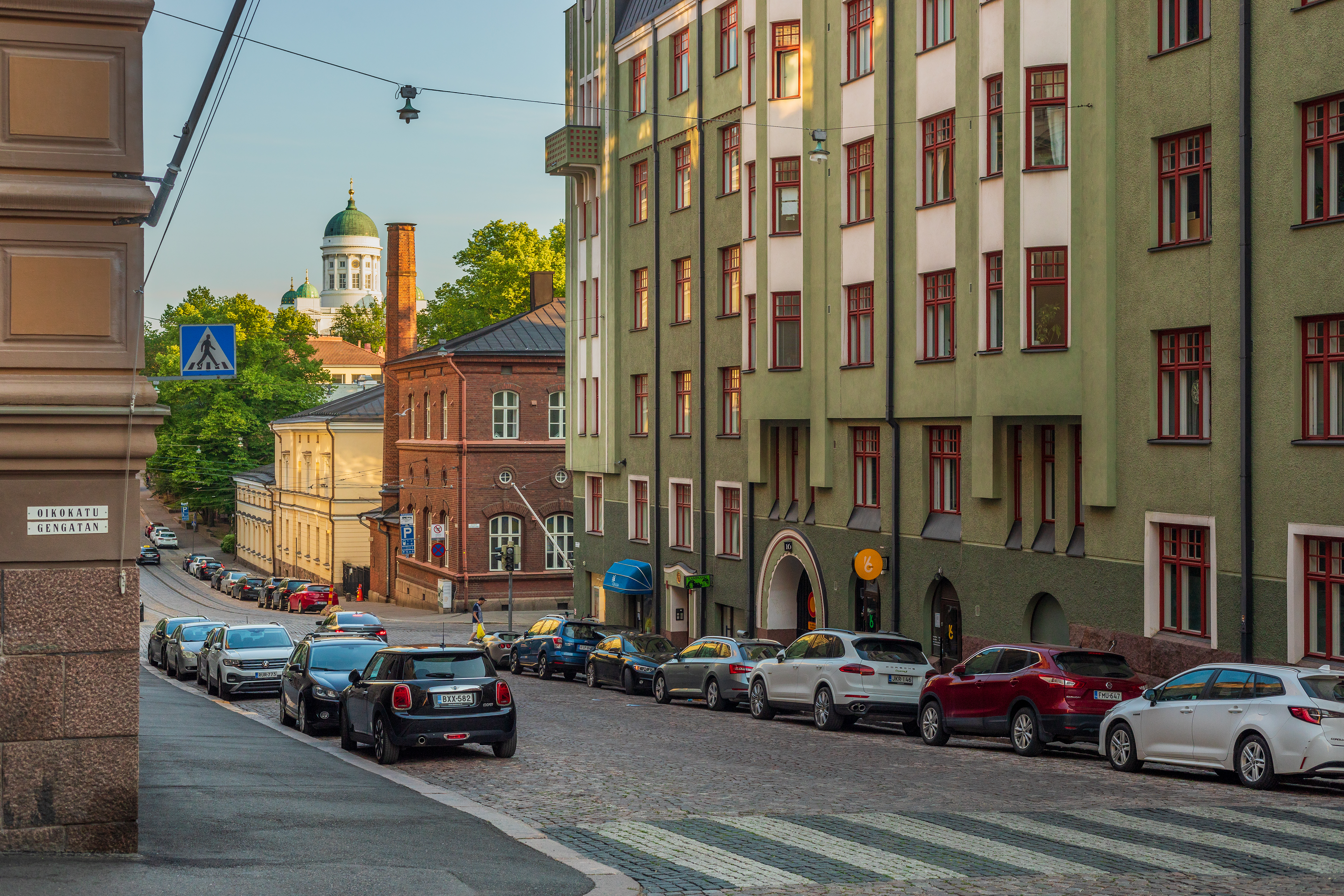
Snellmaninkatu street in June 2022

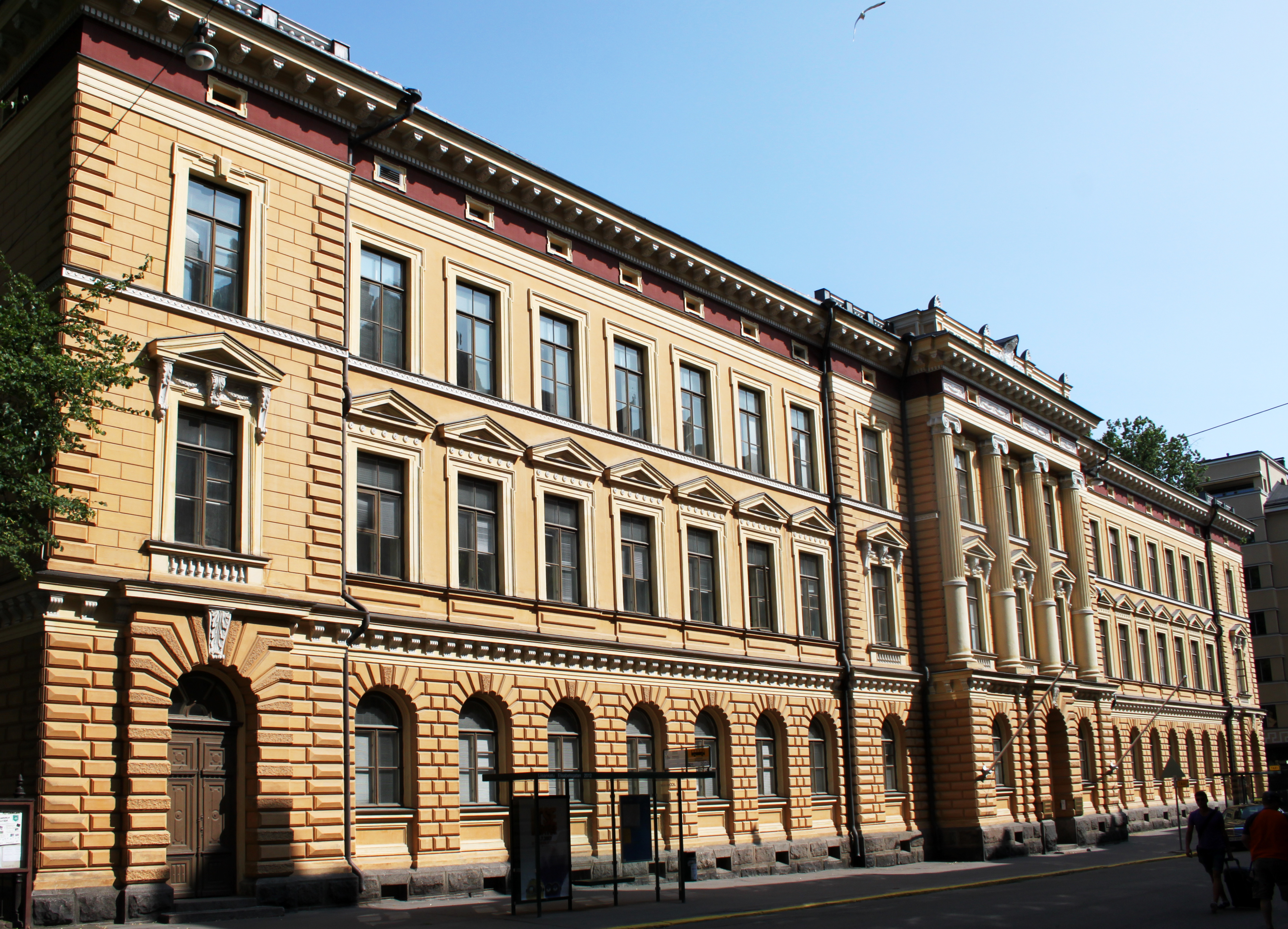
Former barracks of Uusimaa Battalion, current Hotel Maria

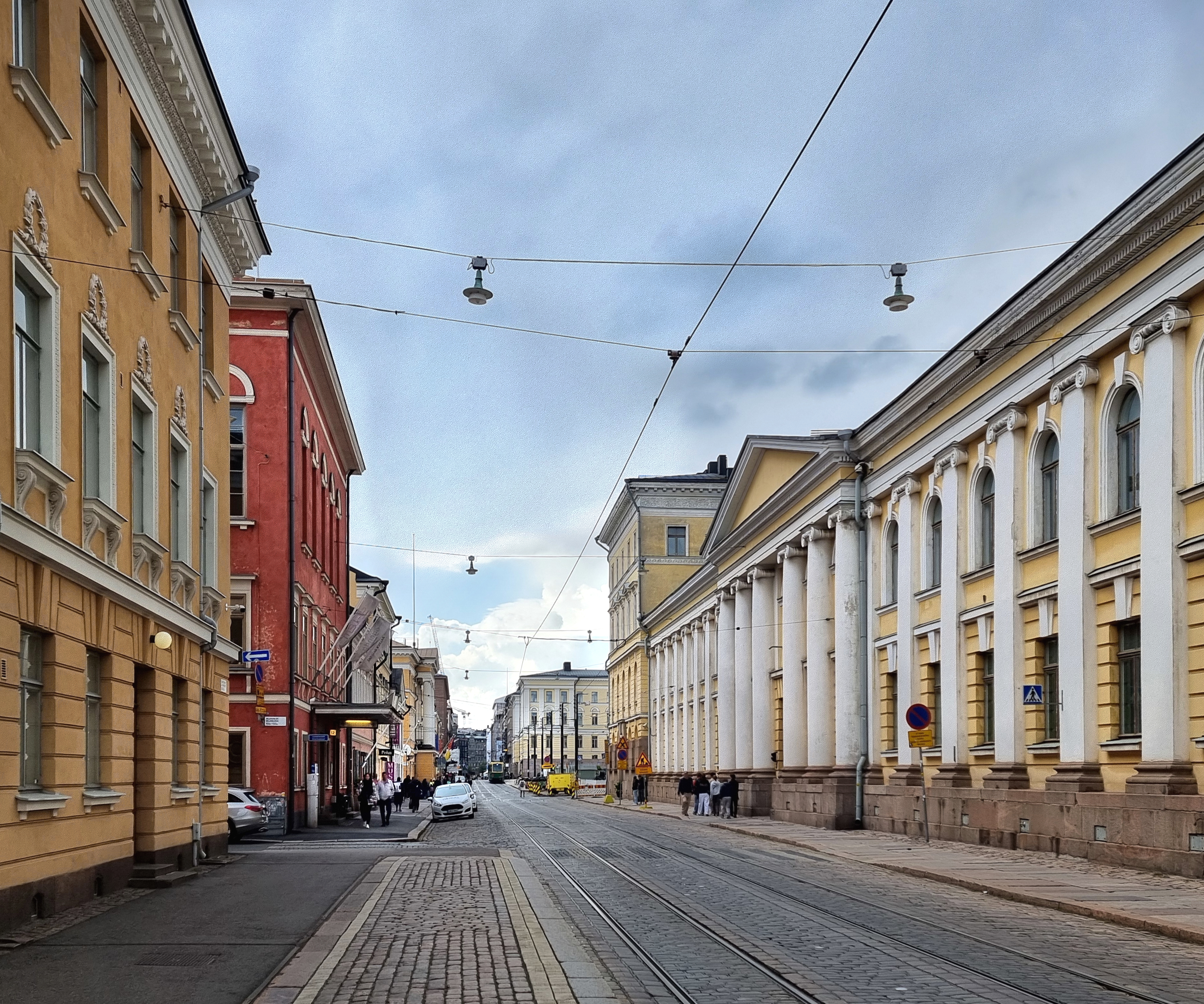
Aleksanterinkatu

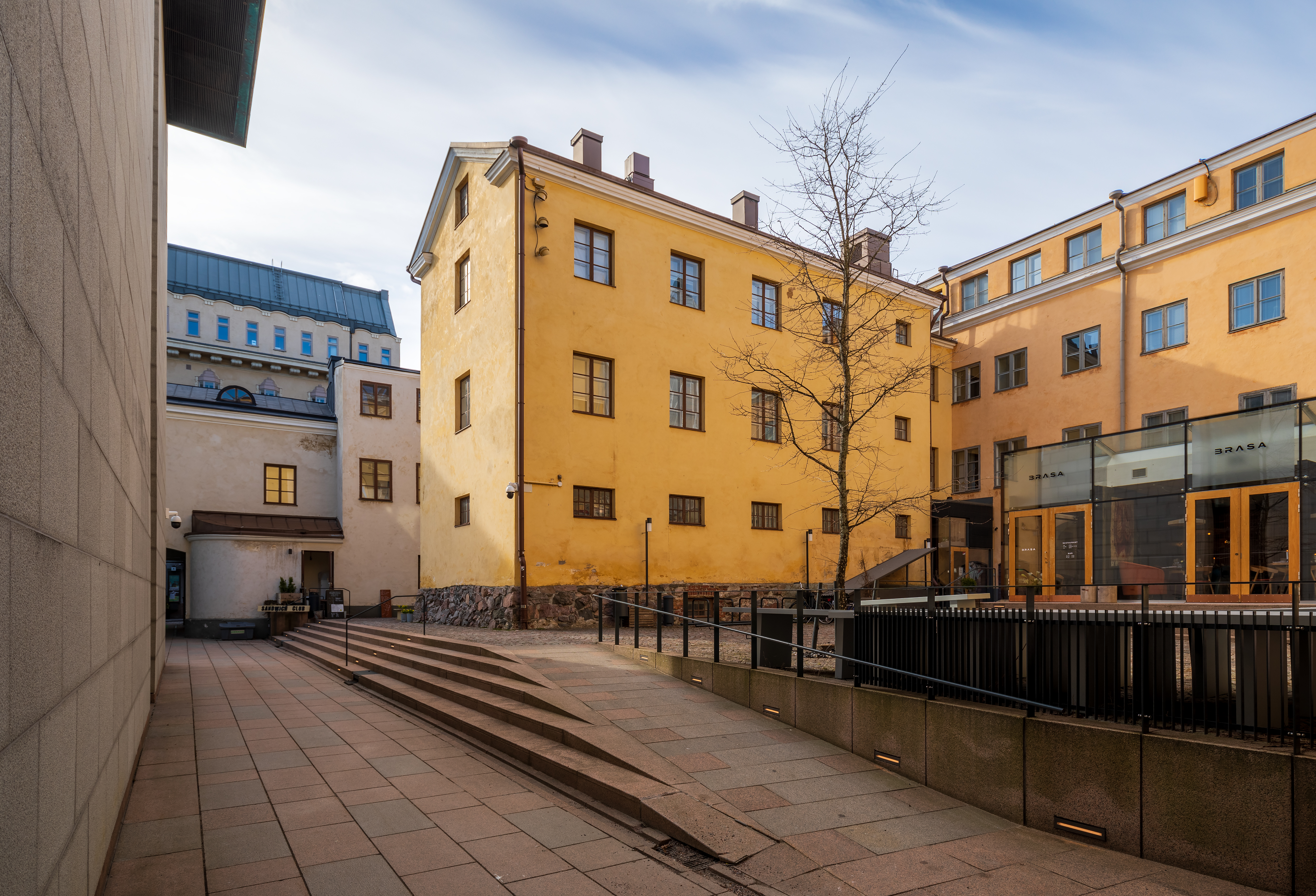
Inner yard at Aleksanterinkatu 20–24

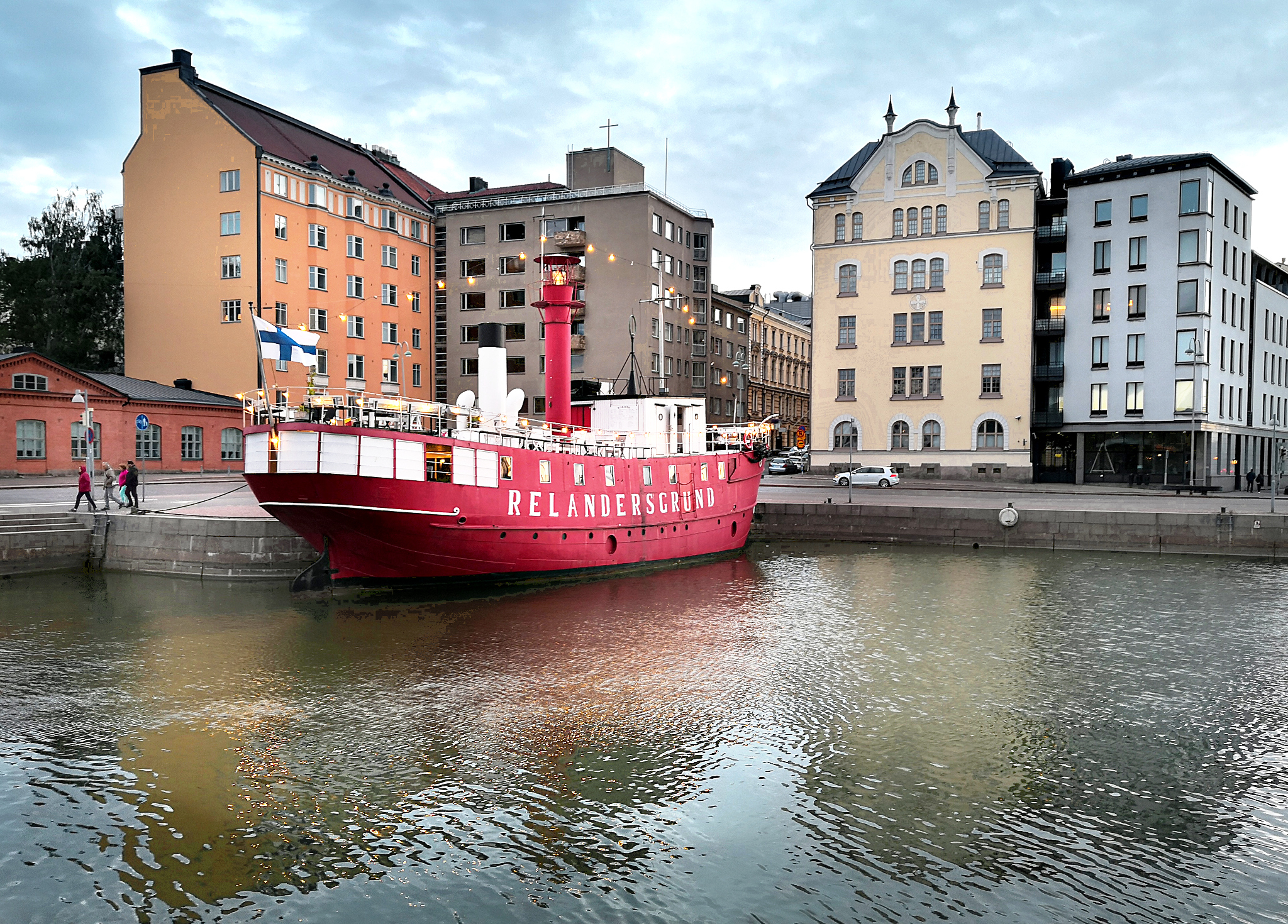
Meritullintori

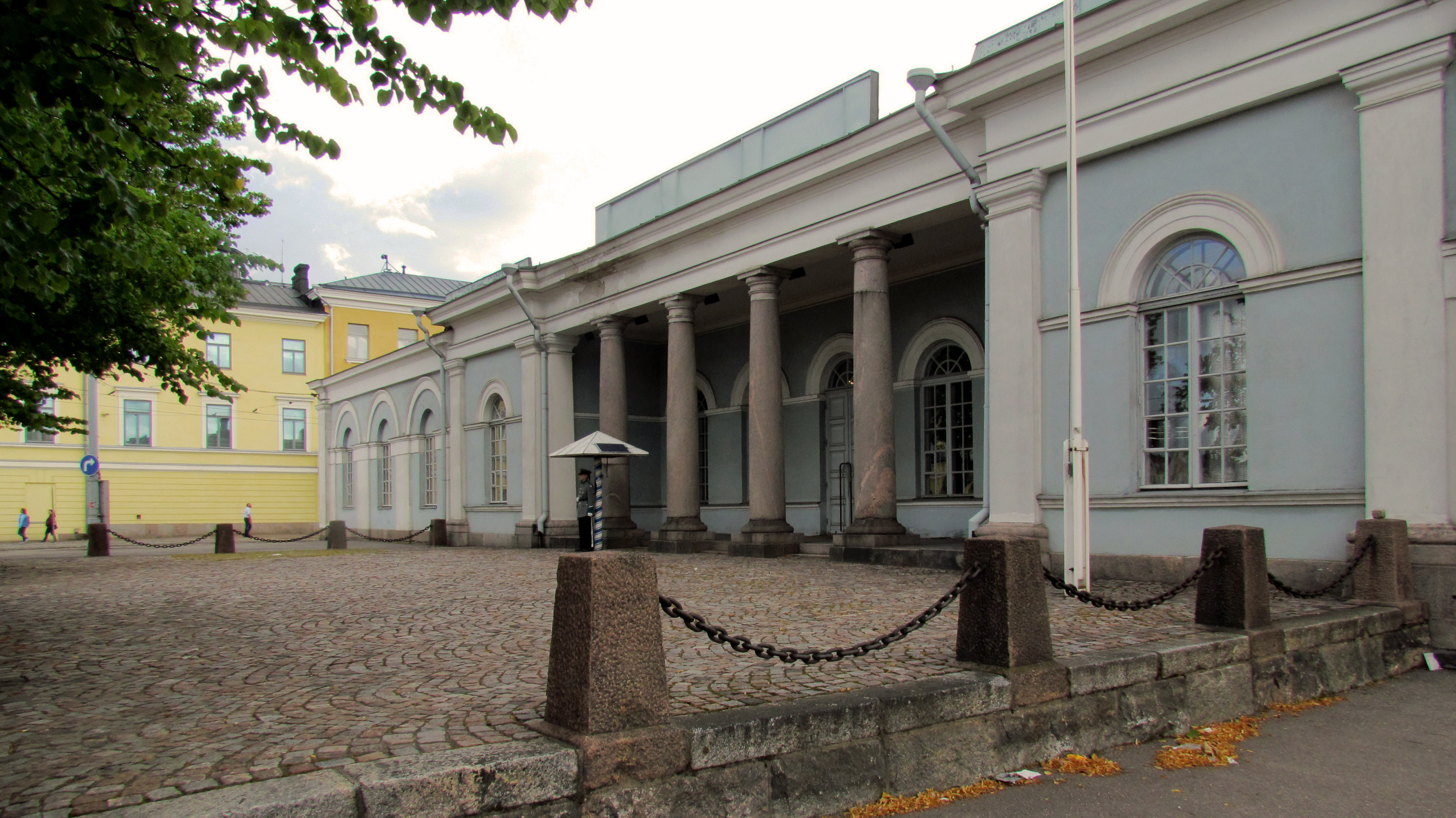
Main Guard Post

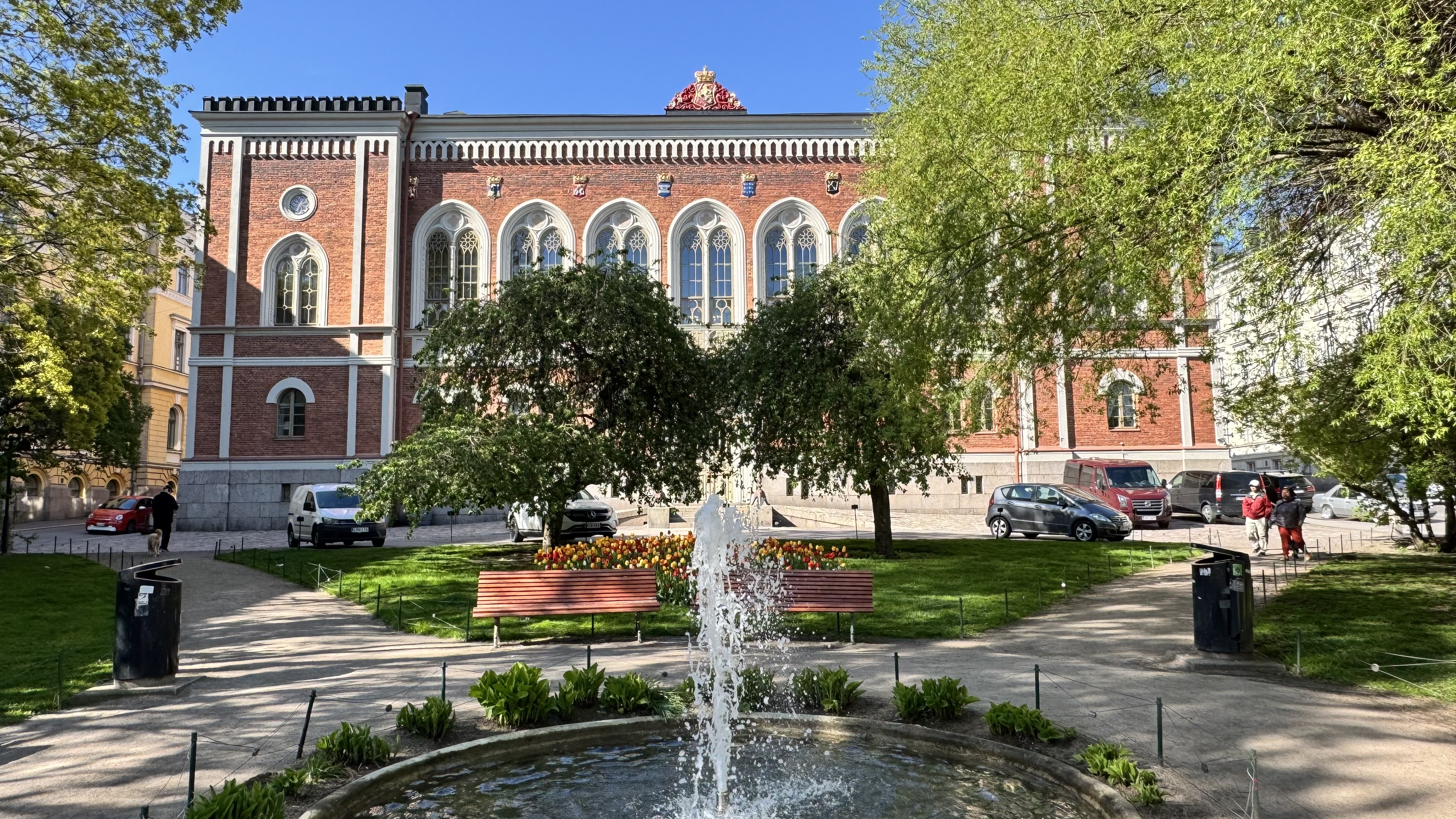
House of Nobility

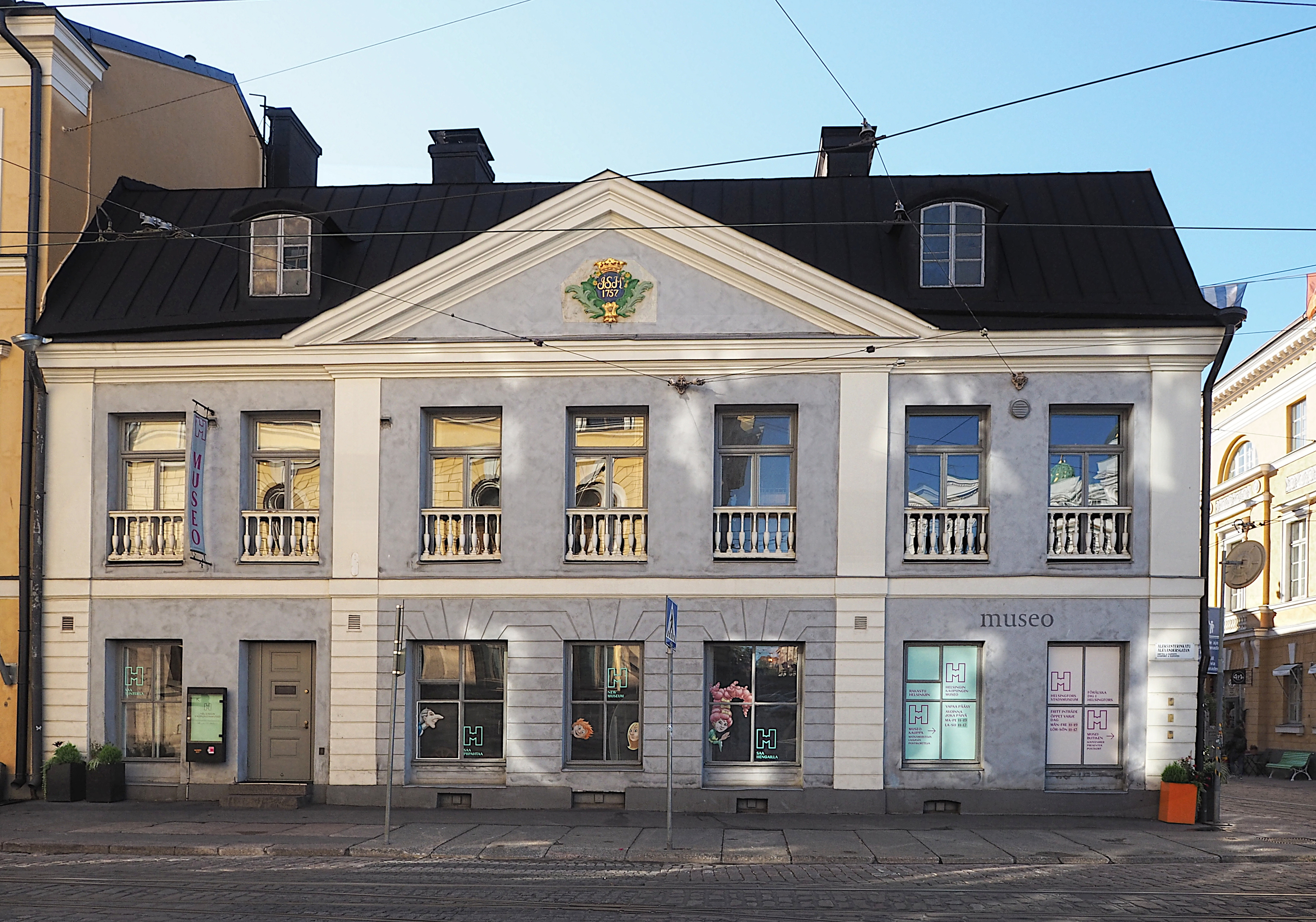
Sederholm House

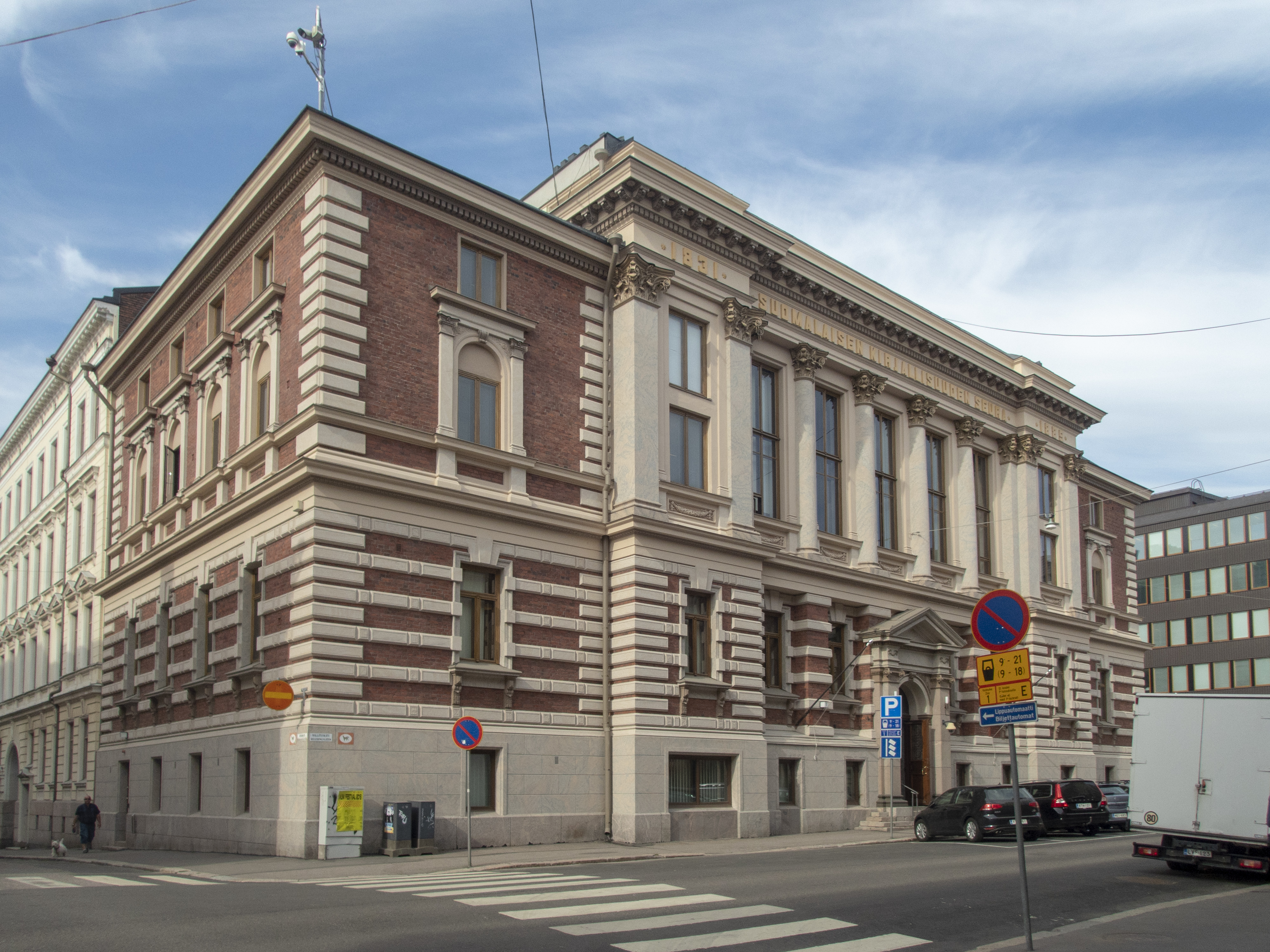
Finnish Literature Society

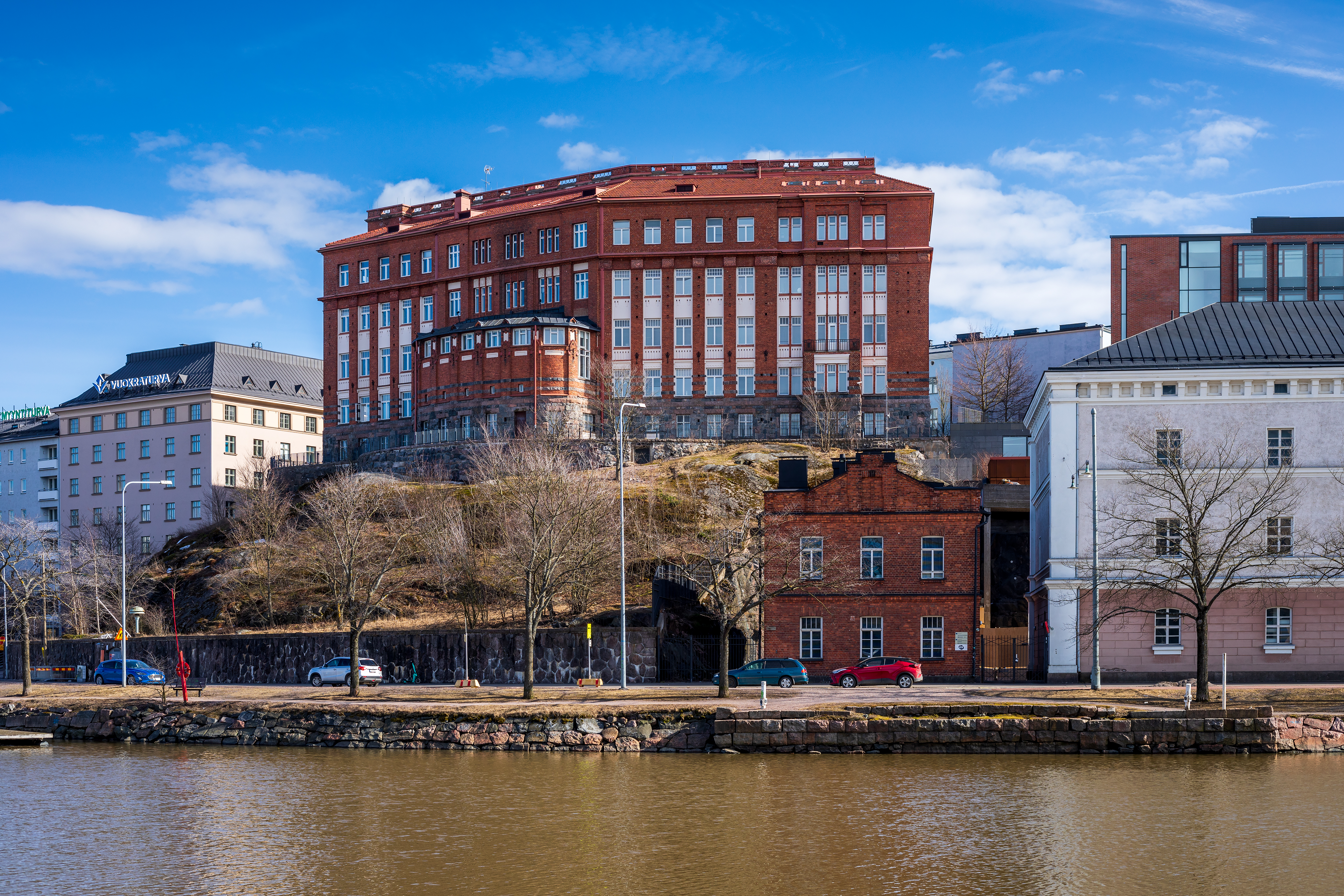
Siltavuori

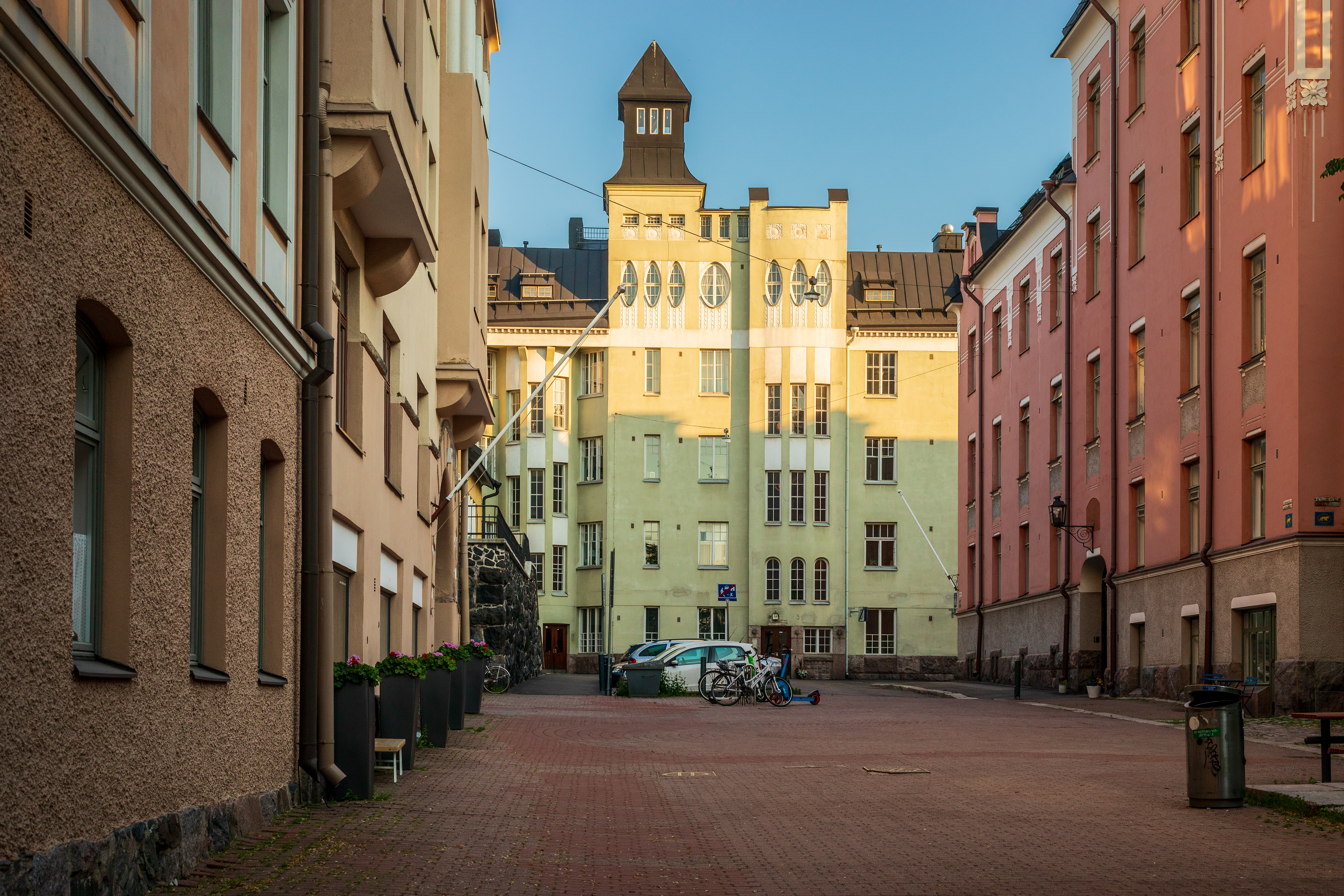
Karelian House

== See also ==
- Katajanokka
- Kluuvi
- Pohjoisranta
- Ullanlinna
- Vironniemi
