= Vanhakaupunki =

Coordinates: 60°13′N 24°59′E

Vanhakaupunki Gammelstaden
- Helsinki Subdivision
- Position of Vanhakaupunki within Helsinki
- Country: Finland
- Region: Uusimaa
- Sub-region: Greater Helsinki
- Municipality: Helsinki
- District: Central
- Area: 0.32 km^{2} (0.12 sq mi)
- Population (1/1/04): 225
  - Density: 703/km^{2} (1,820/sq mi)
- Postal codes: 00560
- Subdivision number: 27
- Neighbouring subdivisions: Toukola, Kumpula, Käpylä, Koskela, Oulunkylä, Viikki

Vanhakaupunki (Finnish: [ˈʋɑnhɑˌkɑu̯puŋki]; Swedish: Gammelstaden) is a neighbourhood of the city of Helsinki, Finland, to the north of Toukola. It is also the name of a district of the city, which contains the neighbourhood and its surroundings. The name (meaning "old town") comes from the fact that Helsinki was originally founded in the Vanhakaupunki area. The Swedish name Gamla Helsingfors (meaning "Old Helsinki") appears in the new Helsinki foundation document from 1639, as the city was moved to its later location, and the forms Gamla staden or Gammelstaden came into use after this. The Finnish translation of the name only started appearing in the late 19th century. The current names were established as official in 1909. The neighbourhood was named Vanhakaupunki in 1959.

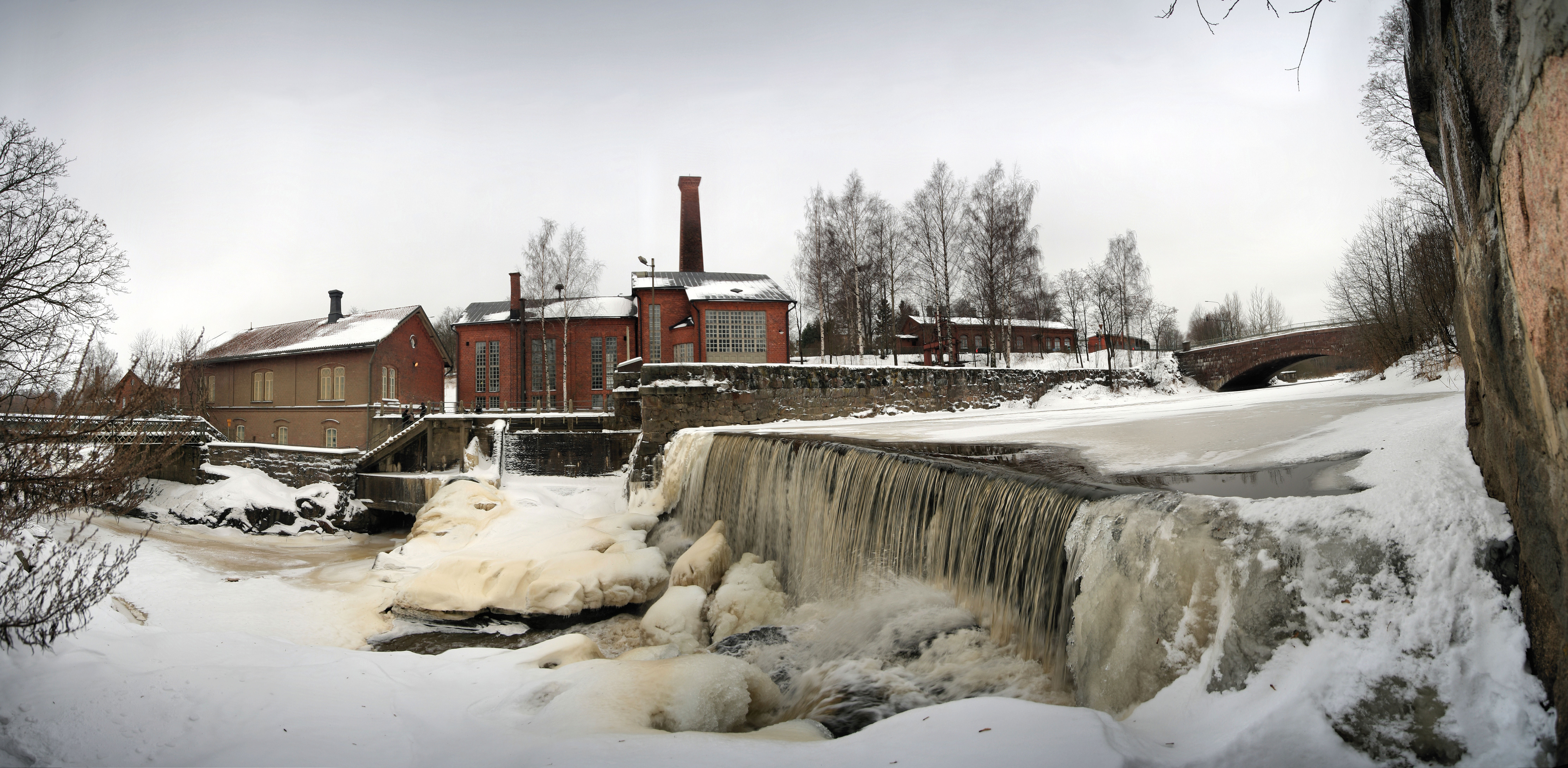
A weir in Vantaa River and a small hydro-electric power station by Kuninkaankartanonsaari island.

== History ==
The Swedish king Gustav Vasa founded Helsinki on June 12, 1550 on the mouth of the Vantaa River on the site of the medieval village of Forsby (Finnish: Koskela). The city was to compete with Tallinn for the commerce in the Bay of Finland and to reduce the illegal trading done by peasants. The inhabitants from the city were drawn from the cities of Rauma, Ekenäs, Ulvila, and Porvoo, which were discontinued.

In 1570, a fire broke out in Helsinki in the winter, and in summer, the black plague spread into the city. The city had about 500 inhabitants at that point.

In the 1640s, Helsinki was moved to its current location on the Vironniemi peninsula because of better harbour conditions, to boost the city commerce. Vanhakaupunki was slowly deserted.

Only one map, a small-scale map drawn by Hans Hansson in 1645, remains of the first Helsinki. It depicts the city's location and the layout plan for its later years. The city blocks appear in the map, but the lots aren't marked. The only building drawn on the map is the church, which was located west of the north end of the current Vanhankaupungintie road.

== Currently ==
Today, Vanhakaupunki is the name of two different organisational subdivisions of Helsinki. It is a neighbourhood, with an area of 0.32 km² west of the Vanhankaupunginlahti bay. The area has about 230 inhabitants and 850 jobs.

Additionally, the Vanhakaupunki district (Vanhankaupungin peruspiiri) is a subdivision of the Helsinki central major district, and includes the Vanhakaupunki neighbourhood as well as the neighbourhoods of Arabianranta, Toukola, Kumpula, Käpylä, and Koskela. The district has an area of 5.38 km² and about 22000 inhabitants in total.
