= Metsälä =

Coordinates: 60.2217°N 24.9409°E

Metsälä Krämertsskog
- Helsinki Subdivision
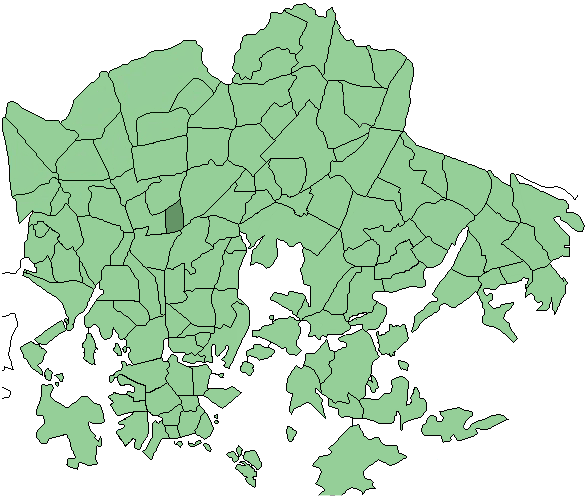
- Position of Metsälä within Helsinki
- Country: Finland
- Region: Uusimaa
- Sub-region: Greater Helsinki
- Municipality: Helsinki
- District: Northern
- Area: 0.56 km^{2} (0.22 sq mi)
- Population (Jan 1 2005): 1,005
  - Density: 1,795/km^{2} (4,650/sq mi)
- Postal codes: 00620, 00621
- Subdivision number: 283
- Neighbouring subdivisions: Maunulanpuisto, Maunula, Patola, Käpylä, Pohjois-Pasila

Metsälä (Swedish: Krämertsskog) is a subdivision of Helsinki with about 1,000 inhabitants. It has predominantly small houses and it is situated between Maunula and Käpylä. Administratively speaking, Metsälä is a part of the Maunula district. The distance to Helsinki City Centre is about 6 kilometres from Metsälä. The primary housing type has been wooden single-family homes, and many terraced houses have been in the area in the 1970s. Nowadays Metsälä has few unbuilt lots.

Metsälä can be separated into two functionally different parts. In the north, there is a residential area dominated by small houses. On the west side of this area, there is an urban forest belonging to the Maunulanpuisto park in the Helsinki Central Park. In the east, Metsälä is bordered by Tuusulanväylä. On the other side of the highway, there is Patola, or the old part of Oulunkylä.

Traffic connections to Metsälä are excellent. It can easily be reached by bicycle, mass transit or car. In the southeast part of the area, there is Käpylä railway station belonging to the Helsinki commuter rail system. Using walkways, Metsälä can be reached easily from the west through Central Park and from the east along the railway and through the station area.

Metsälä used to be a busy logistics centre, especially south of Asesepäntie and north of the Pasila railway yard. Transportation and freight traffic companies in this area used to provide the majority of 1,020 jobs in Metsälä (as of December 31, 2003). As of 2018, DB Schenker's old building is the only one left, as residential buildings are being built and distribution centres moved closer to the Vantaa airport or other Uusimaa locations.

== Related links ==
- Satellite imagery over Metsälä.
