= Oulunkylä =

Oulunkylä Åggelby
- Helsinki Subdivision; Former municipality
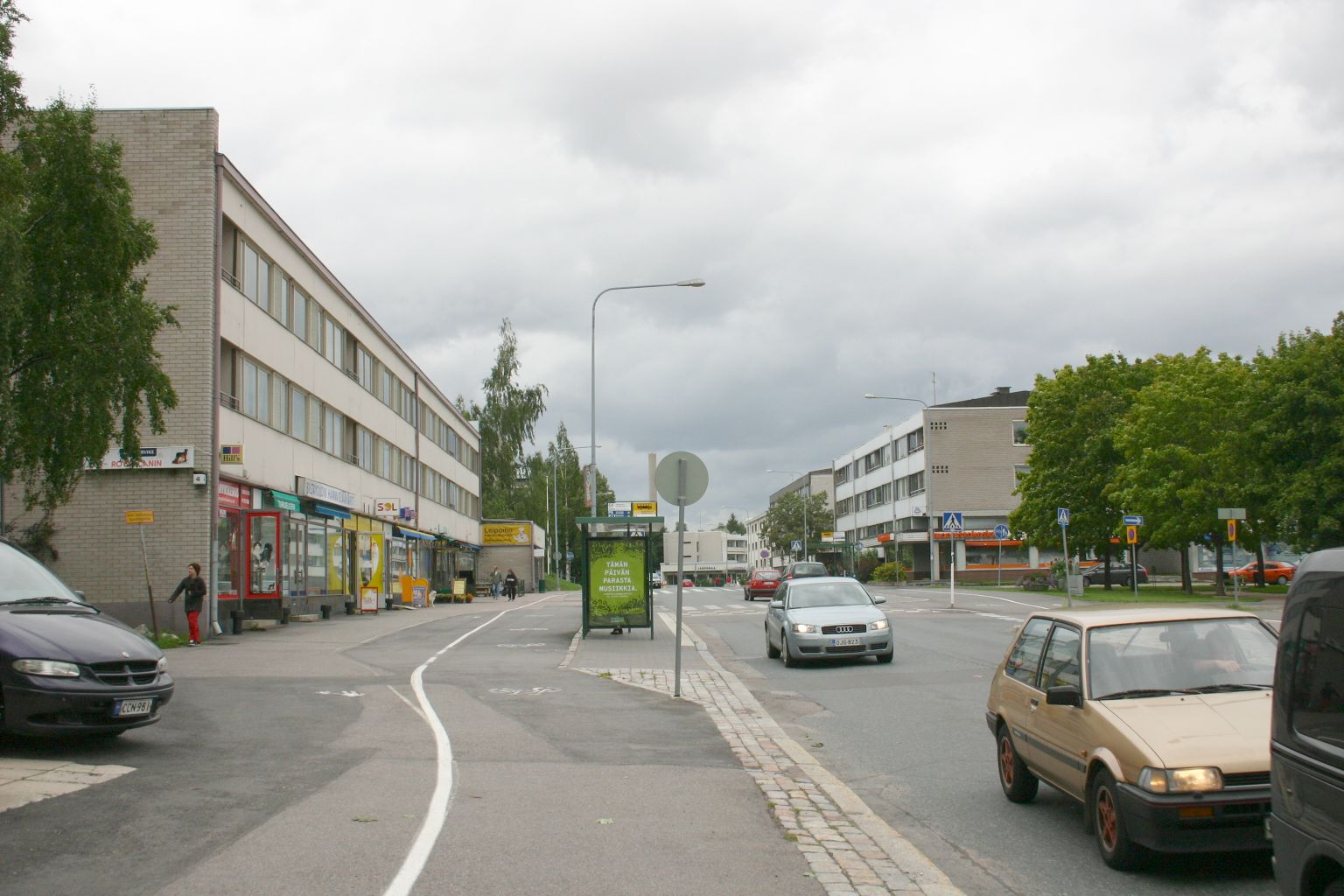
- Siltavoudintie Street in Oulunkylä in 2005.

- Position of Oulunkylä within Helsinki

- Location of Oulunkylä municipality in Finland (1935).
- Interactive map of Oulunkylä district
- Location within Uusimaa Location within Finland Location within Europe
- Country: Finland
- Province: Uusimaa Province
- Region: Uusimaa
- Sub-region: Helsinki metropolitan area
- Municipality: Helsinki
- District: Northern
- Established from Helsingin maalaiskunta: 1921
- Merged to Helsinki: 1946
- Subdivision regions: Maunula, Maunulanpuisto, Metsälä, Patola, Pirkkola, Veräjälaakso, Veräjämäki
- Area: 8.61 km^{2} (3.32 sq mi)
- Population (12/3/22): 22,420
  - Density: 2,614/km^{2} (6,770/sq mi)
- Postal codes: 00620, 00630, 00640, 00650
- Subdivision number: 28
- Neighbouring subdivisions: Pasila, Käpylä, Koskela, Haaga, Kaarela, Pakila, Viikki, Pukinmäki, Malmi

Oulunkylä (Swedish: Åggelby, also known as Ogeli) is a suburb and a neighbourhood of Helsinki, the capital of Finland. It is located 6 kilometres (4 mi) north from the center of the city.

It has been inhabited since the 13th century. Earlier an independent municipality, it was made part of Helsinki in 1946. It's neighbouring municipalities were Huopalahti and Haaga to the west, Helsingin maalaiskunta to the north and west, and Helsinki to the south.

Oulunkylä is also the name of a district. It consists of Patola, Veräjämäki and Veräjälaakso, and has a total area of 4.51 km^{2}.

== History ==
For centuries, Oulunkylä was part of Helsingin pitäjä (now Vantaa). The neighbourhood started to grow after a railway station was founded there in 1881 along the Finland's first railway line between Helsinki and Hämeenlinna. In the late 19th century and early 20th century Oulunkylä was known for many villas that were built there. In 1921 it was separated from Helsingin pitäjä and became an independent municipality. However, most of the Oulunkylä area was already owned by the City of Helsinki and in 1946 Oulunkylä, along with many other suburbs, was annexed by Helsinki.

The modern Oulunkylä is largely constructed according to the zoning scheme of 1953 that transformed the neighbourhood from a villa community into an apartment building suburb.

== Sports ==
Oulunkylä Ice Rink, a rink used for speed skating and bandy, is located in Oulunkylä. It was the first artificial ice pad for those sports in Finland. The Bandy World Championship has been hosted here.

=== Bandy ===
Botnia-69 has Oulunkylä Ice Rink as its home arena.

=== Ice-hockey ===
Oulunkylän Kiekko-Kerho

=== Football ===
IF Gnistan is a team.

== Notable people ==
- Ville Valo
- Tapio Rautavaara
- Cynthia Makris
- Raimo Sirkiä
- Mikko Paananen
- Tito Colliander
- Joel Lehtonen
- Larin-Kyösti
- Friedebert Tuglas
- Helena Hietanen
- Vladimir Lenin lived here hiding from the Russian police.
