= FIMR =

FIMR may refer to:

- ICAO call sign for Sir Gaëtan Duval Airport
- Finnish Institute of Marine Research
