= Koskela teen murder =

2020 murder in Helsinki, Finland

Koskela teen murder Koskela (Finland)
- Location: Koskela, Helsinki, Finland.
- Date: December 4, 2020; 5 years ago
- Attack type: Murder
- Deaths: 1
- Perpetrator: Three teenage boys

The Koskela teen murder was a homicide that occurred in Koskela, Helsinki, Finland on 4 December 2020. The victim was a 16-year-old, the name of whom has yet to be released by Finnish law enforcement due to privacy regulations. The police charged three juvenile males, all aged 16, with the murder. They were incarcerated in the Helsinki District Court on 10 December. The perpetrators and the victim knew each other beforehand. According to the police, the motive for the act was to punish the victim for some earlier activity.

The prosecutors requested a sentence of nine years in prison without parole for the accused. The district court gave an intermediary sentence on 24 March 2021, sentencing the accused to psychiatric assessment.

The final verdict was given on September 3, 2021 in the Helsinki District Court, where the three defendants received prison sentences of 10 years one month, 9 years 2 months, and 8 years 2 months respectively.

== Background ==
The victim of the homicide was a 16-year-old boy, who was described as loyal, nice, gifted and personal, but also as very lonely and quiet. He had met two of the accused already in kindergarten and went to school together with them in Käpylä. He met the third member of the accused in high school. One of the victim's schoolmates described the victim and one of the accused as being best friends during primary school. The victim had, however, suffered extensive bullying since primary school, at the hands of both the accused as well as students. The bullying had begun as name-calling and insulting, but later progressed to physical violence. In his last years the victim had suffered from severe depression and his circle of friends had shrunk.

The victim's parents long sought for help for their son, and in autumn 2020 the victim was placed in a state care in Helsinki per his parents' request.

Before the homicide, the accused had robbed the victim in August 2020. The robbery had involved violence and the victim was robbed of property and money. The incident was reported to the police in September. The accused had repeatedly assaulted the victim since summer. According to the police, the killers viewed the victim as submissive and treated him like a "rag doll" they could abuse. The theme of the assault and homicide was a "punishment game" connected to the bullying.

== Timeline ==
The victim and the perpetrators had been at the birthday party of one of the perpetrators near the Koskela Hospital on Friday 4 December. The perpetrators had planned in advance to force the victim to drink alcohol. At first the four spent the evening quietly. At some point the three boys began to assault the partially defenseless fourth boy. The victim begun to cry, asked the perpetrators to stop and tried to stop the blows with his arms, but did not participate in violence himself.

The victim was assaulted in various locations close to the hospital. According to the police, the violence lasted three to four hours and was humiliating to the victim: the perpetrators forced the victim to drink an entire bottle of Vergi vodka, hit him on various parts of his body very violently with their fists and a metal pipe and spit and urinated on him. The victim had become severely inebriated from the alcohol. One of the boys strangled the victim, tried to break his arm and jumped on him from on top of a crate.

A woman who had been walking at the Koskela Hospital area at eight o'clock in the evening had seen two of the accused and the victim, who was clearly in a bad way. One of the perpetrators was absent at the time and returned later to continue to participate in the violence. They were also seen at 8pm by a younger woman who was walking in a park near the hospital. She also saw three boys, one of whom was lying down. The woman had shouted to ask what was happening, to which the boys had replied that there was no problem and asked the woman to leave. The woman could not judge the situation herself as it was too dark. She telephoned her elder sister to come and judge the situation. The women deemed the situation to be threatening and did not intervene. The boys moved to the other side of the hospital and dragged the boy, who had been lying down, holding him by the shoulders.

The accused recorded their act on video with their mobile phones, demonstrating how they exploded a firecracker between the victim's buttocks. At the end of the video all three perpetrators laughed loudly and shook hands with each other. In the video, the victim was lying on his side with his trousers pulled down and could not move at all. As the assault continued, the victim could no longer speak but to tried to raise his hands on his face to shield himself from the blows. As he was being strangled, he tried to pull the perpetrator's hand downward to get air. The most violent of the perpetrators later revealed he had felt an inexplicable sense of rage during the assault, which had only gone away when he was walking back home.

The victim's face was covered in injuries when the perpetrators started to carry him to the next location. They inspected the victim using the flashlights on their telephones. At about 11pm, the perpetrators went to a grocery store to shop and did not call for help for the victim. The victim was left lying on the ground, with clear injuries to his face, and was unable to walk. He managed to move but only a short distance. The victim died a couple of hours later.

Two of the perpetrators came the next day to see the body, which was still at the same location. The perpetrators discussed the matter repeatedly over the weekend and, despite expressing shock, planned to hide or destroy the body. They also planned to clean the body with bleach in order to remove DNA evidence and fingerprints.

The victim's body remained on the murder site over the weekend until Monday 7 December, when it was discovered by a construction worker at eight o'clock in the morning. The body was partially naked. The man first thought the boy was unconscious and called the emergency help centre, which advised him and his colleague to start to revive the boy. The revival was stopped when the body was found to be cold and stiff. Soon, the emergency services arrived at the scene and questioned the discoverer. On the same morning one of the perpetrators told his mother about the assault, and she called the police immediately.

== Investigation and trial ==
During the police investigation all three of the perpetrators denied having planned to kill the victim. In February 2021 the perpetrators were charged with murder, robbery, incitement to robbery and nine counts of assault. The victim's parents demanded the perpetrators be sentenced to 12 years in prison. Two of them pleaded guilty to aggravated assault and manslaughter, while the third boy only pleaded guilty to assault.

The trial took place in a secure room at the Helsinki District Court on 17 February 2021. A lawyer representing the victim's family asked that the trial be wholly held behind closed doors. Conversely, the prosecutors demanded as public a trial as possible due to the severity of the crimes and the great public interest in the matter. The chairman of the court announced that the public element of the trial will be assessed separately for each charge. The charges were tried in chronological order, starting with a robbery in August and ending with the homicide on 4 December.

The final statements were made on 3 March 2021. The prosecution demanded a sentence of at least 12 years in prison without parole for the oldest of the accused, at least 11 years for the youngest and at least 9 years and 6 months for the third. All of the accused were remanded in custody. In addition, all of the accused were required to undergo psychiatric assessment. The youngest of the accused asked to be released on bail before the main trial, but the court denied the request.

The prosecution claimed the act constituted a murder because it was committed with great violence and cruelty. According to them, the perpetrators must have known the violence would very realistically result in the death of the victim. The prosecution underlined that all three of the accused were participants in the crime and cited text messages they sent to each other in which they discuss "hitting" the victim as evidence of pre-meditation. The prosecution also noted they had already assaulted the victim three times, and the violence had grown greater each time.

The lawyer of the youngest of the accused said that the most serious acts of violence had been committed by the oldest boy, and the youngest boy had tried to calm him down. The lawyer of the second oldest boy said that the accused could not be expected to have an adult's view of what results the violence might have. According to him, the accused had thought the victim would eventually get up and walk home. The lawyer of the oldest boy accused the other defendants of trying to shift blame to the oldest boy. According to the defense, the weapons used in the assault had not been such that the accused would have understood at the time that the act would result in death. They argued that the accused had an unrealistic concept of the resilience of the human body to violence, based on mixed martial arts videos.

== Negligence by authorities ==
The victim was in state care, and did not live with his parents. They called the police when they learned he had not returned to his child care residence. Despite the request, there was no search for the boy during the whole weekend of the murder.

During a wide investigation by Yleisradio, Finland's public broadcast radio, it became apparent that the victim had been left without support during primary school and later during child care. According to his teachers, the victim's difficulties were handled too late and sometimes even neglected.

== Reaction ==
The matter caused shock all over Finland and led to heated discussion about youth violence. Large numbers of candles were brought to the murder site in remembrance of the victim. In honour of the victim's memory and in opposition to bullying, an unofficial remembrance event was held on 5 March 2021 where candles were lit at visible locations throughout the country. The idea for the event came from the "Oikeutta Koskelan uhrille" ("Justice For Koskela's victim") Facebook group. Candles were lit, for example, in Helsinki in front of the Parliament House, in Turku in front of the Turku Cathedral, in Lahti on the stairs of the Ristinkirkko church and in Kuopio near the Statue of the Wounded Soldier. The murder also caused a wide discussion related to lynching, and stricter punishment and stricter discipline were offered as solutions in public debates.

The police made an exceptionally extensive announcement about the investigation, even at a preliminary stage, such was public interest in the matter Jonna Turunen, the chief of the criminal investigation unit of the Police Department of Helsinki, said the case was completely exceptional. It also brought to light the need of resources for child care. The investigation leader Marko Forss described the crime as sadistic. According to Minister of the Interior Maria Ohisalo, the incident reveals the mental health problems accumulating among the young. According to Professor Emerita of criminal justice of the University of Lapland Terttu Utriainen, the Koskela murder was exceptionally violent and very rare in Finland. Utriainen also said the incident shows that many youths have lost any sense of responsibility of their own actions and their values have become blurred.

The editorial column of Helsingin Sanomat on Sunday 21 February said that the extensive and completely unmotivated violence directed at the victim had raised questions about the basic premises of humanity. It stated that, in addition to punishing the perpetrators and explaining the responsibilities of the authorities, there ought to be an investigation into what could lead to evil of this level. Similarly, an editorial column of Ilta-Sanomat on 4 March suggested that the cause and effects of the case should be discussed. The column asked whether the court of law and the community could deal with violent crimes committed by young people.
