= Viikki =

Coordinates: 60°14′N 25°01′E

Viikki Vik
- Helsinki Subdivision
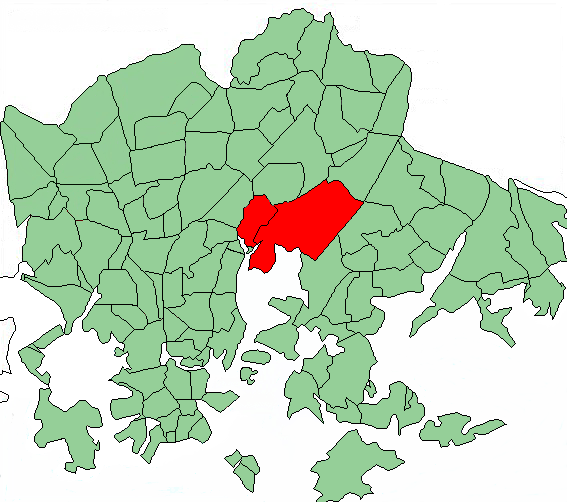
- Position of Viikki within Helsinki
- Country: Finland
- Region: Uusimaa
- Sub-region: Greater Helsinki
- Municipality: Helsinki
- District: Northeastern
- Area: 8.05 km^{2} (3.11 sq mi)
- Population (2019): 15,177
  - Density: 682/km^{2} (1,770/sq mi)
- Postal codes: 00530, 00790
- Subdivision number: 36
- Neighbouring subdivisions: Toukola, Koskela, Vanhakaupunki, Oulunkylä, Malmi, Herttoniemi, Vartiokylä, Mellunkylä

Viikki (Swedish: Vik) is a neighbourhood of about 15,000 inhabitants in Helsinki, Finland. It is located at the northern end of Vanhankaupunginlahti bay, some 7–10 km from the city centre.

The district hosts the Viikki Campus with four of the faculties of the University of Helsinki (biosciences, pharmacy, veterinary medicine, and agriculture and forestry) as well as other university units such as research centres, science library and teacher training school.

Viikki is known for its natural environment. The conservation area of Vanhankaupunginlahti is an important place of nesting and migration for birds. Large fields and farmlands are cultivated by a teaching farm that is part of the university's agricultural faculty. Southernmost part of the Latokartano residential zone is known as an "ecological housing" area. Many apartment buildings there have, for instance, experimental solar and wind energy systems installed.

Viikki is divided into the sub-areas of Viikki science park, Latokartano, Viikinranta and Viikinmäki. In the 2000s the population of the district has increased steadily. This is because some areas of Viikki — especially in Latokartano and Viikinmäki — have been among the most important sites in Helsinki for the construction of new apartments.

== Railway ==
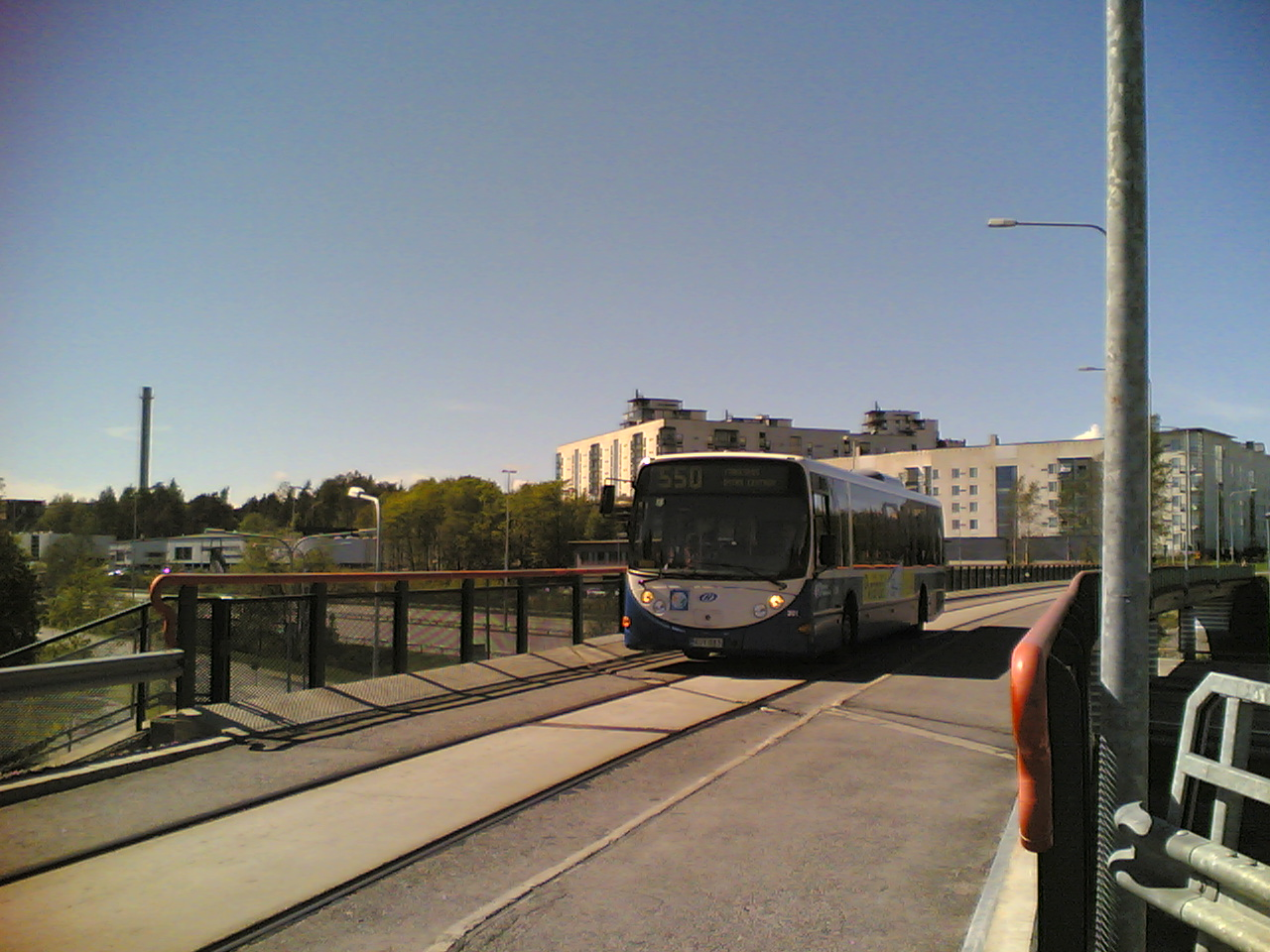
Jokeri-Line 550 bus and Helsinki Metro depot line tracks crossing Finnish national road 4 in Viikki

A single-track non-passenger municipal railway line ran through the district, connecting to the state railways main-line at Oulunkylä railway station. This line runs to the Helsinki Metro depot in Roihupelto, but was originally the former Herttoniemi Harbour railway. The depot link features street running along the roads through Viikki. This line has been broken up during the summer of 2014.

== Light Railway ==
The Raide-Jokeri also known as Jokeri Light Rail is a Passenger Light Rail Line that begun construction near the start of 2019 and was estimated to be completed in 2024. It was completed approximately 10 months earlier than forecasted and under budget, with passenger service began in October 2023. It runs from Itäkeskus to Keilaniemi, replacing trunk bus route 550. The Viikki stops are Viikki Science Park and Latokartano.
