= Finnish Institute of Marine Research =

Finnish governmental research institute

The Finnish Institute of Marine Research (FIMR) (Finnish: Merentutkimuslaitos and Swedish: Havsforskningsinstitutet) was a research institute founded in 1918 that was subordinate to the Ministry of Transport and Communications. The institute's main objective was to produce marine-science information to facilitate decision-making, for Finns and in international collaboration, and for use in seafaring. Biological research would not be included for several decades, and all four internal divisions were headed by physicists or geophysicists through the 1950s.

The Institute was originally housed at Konstantinin Street 8 (now Meritullinkadun) on the Helsinki seaport, and in 1926 moved a mile south to a government building at 2 Tähtitornin St. There it remained until September 2005, when its headquarters became Dynamicum, a building it shares with the Finnish Meteorological Institute in Kumpula, Helsinki.

The institute was closed in the beginning of 2009, and its functions were divided between the Finnish Environment Institute (SYKE) and the Finnish Meteorological Institute (FMI).

== Directors-General ==
- Rolf Witting (1918–1936)
- Erik Palmén (1939–1947)
- Risto Jurva (1947–1953)
- Ilmo Hela (1955–1975)
- Aarno Voipio (1975–1989)
- Pentti Mälkki (1990–2004)
- Eeva-Liisa Poutanen (2005–2008)
