= Akseli Toivonen =

Finnish architect

- Born: 6 April 1887; Hamina, Grand Duchy of Finland
- Died: 10 January 1954 (aged 66)
- Occupation: Architect

Akseli Vilho Toivonen (6 April 1887 Hamina – 10 January 1954) was a Finnish architect. He graduated from Helsinki University of Technology in 1911. He had a major role in planning the Puu-Käpylä neighbourhood in Helsinki in the 1920s. Toivonen also worked as a treasurer of Helsingin kansanasunnot OY for some time. That was the company responsible for the construction of the buildings in Käpylä.

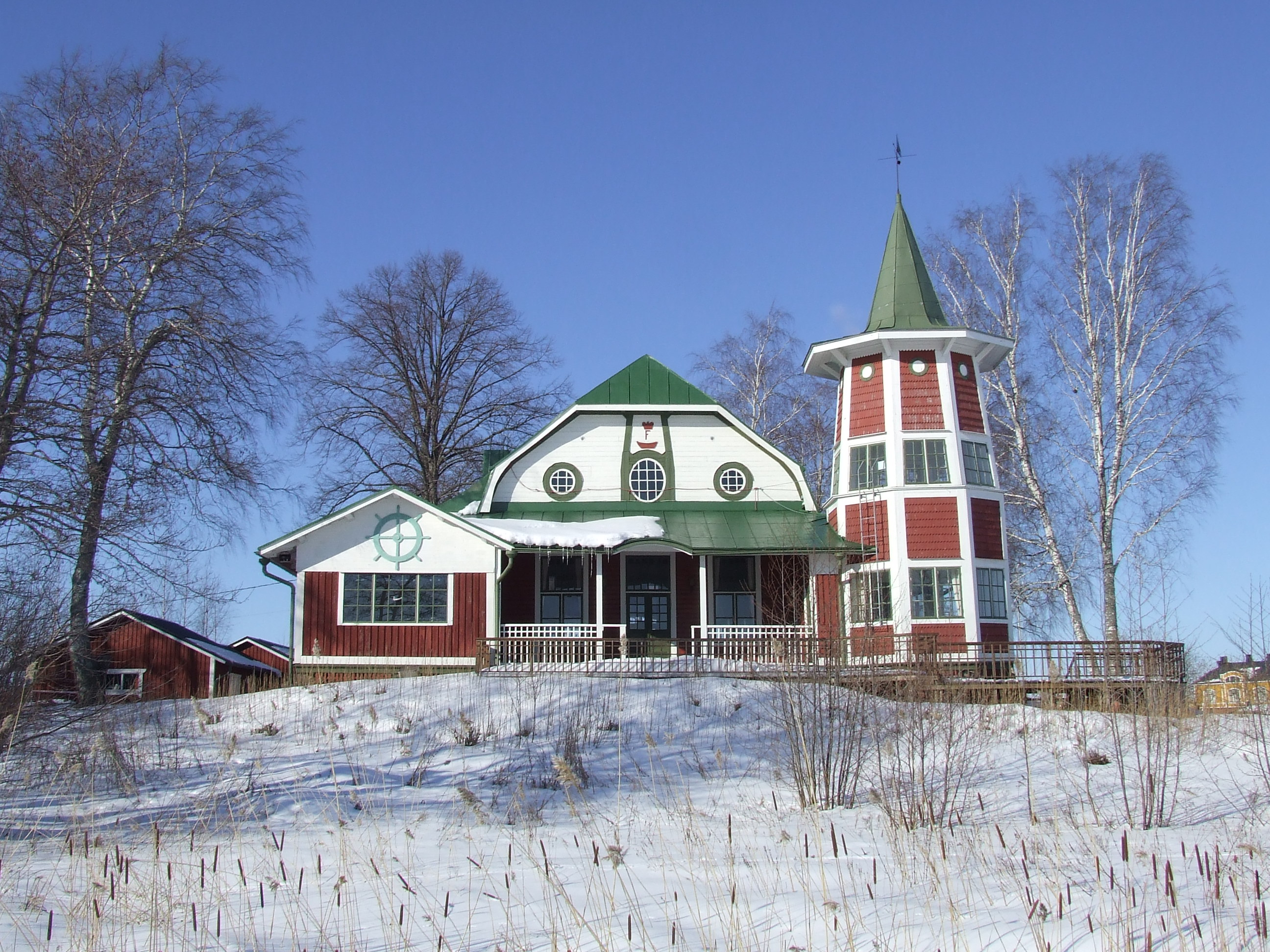
Haminan pursipaviljonki (1909), one of the buildings designed by Toivonen

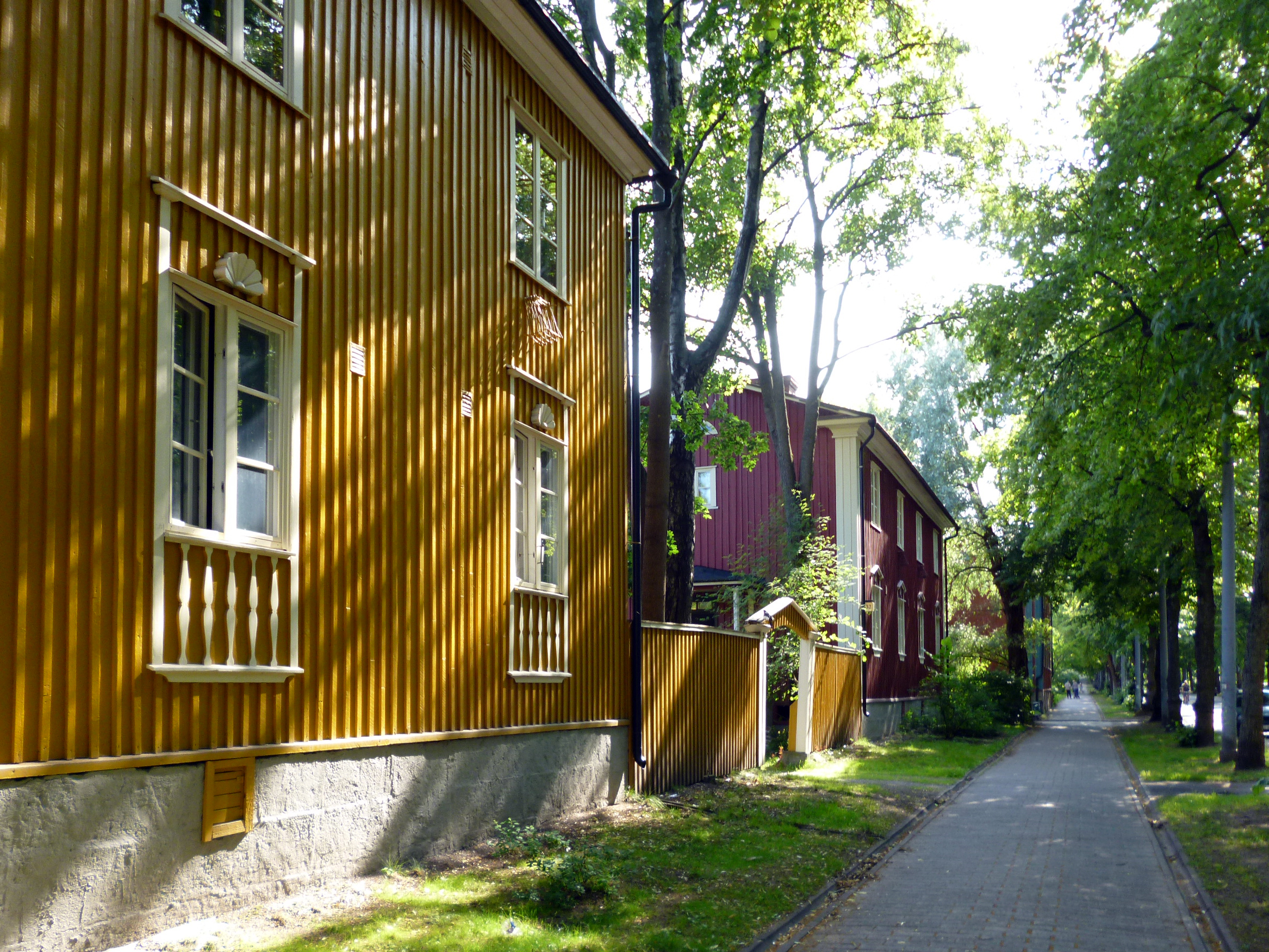
Puu-Käpylä

== Notable work ==
- Haminan pursipaviljonki (1909)
- People's house of Hamina (1912)
- Puu-Käpylä (1920-1925)
