= Dynamicum =

Coordinates: 60.203748°N 24.961131°E

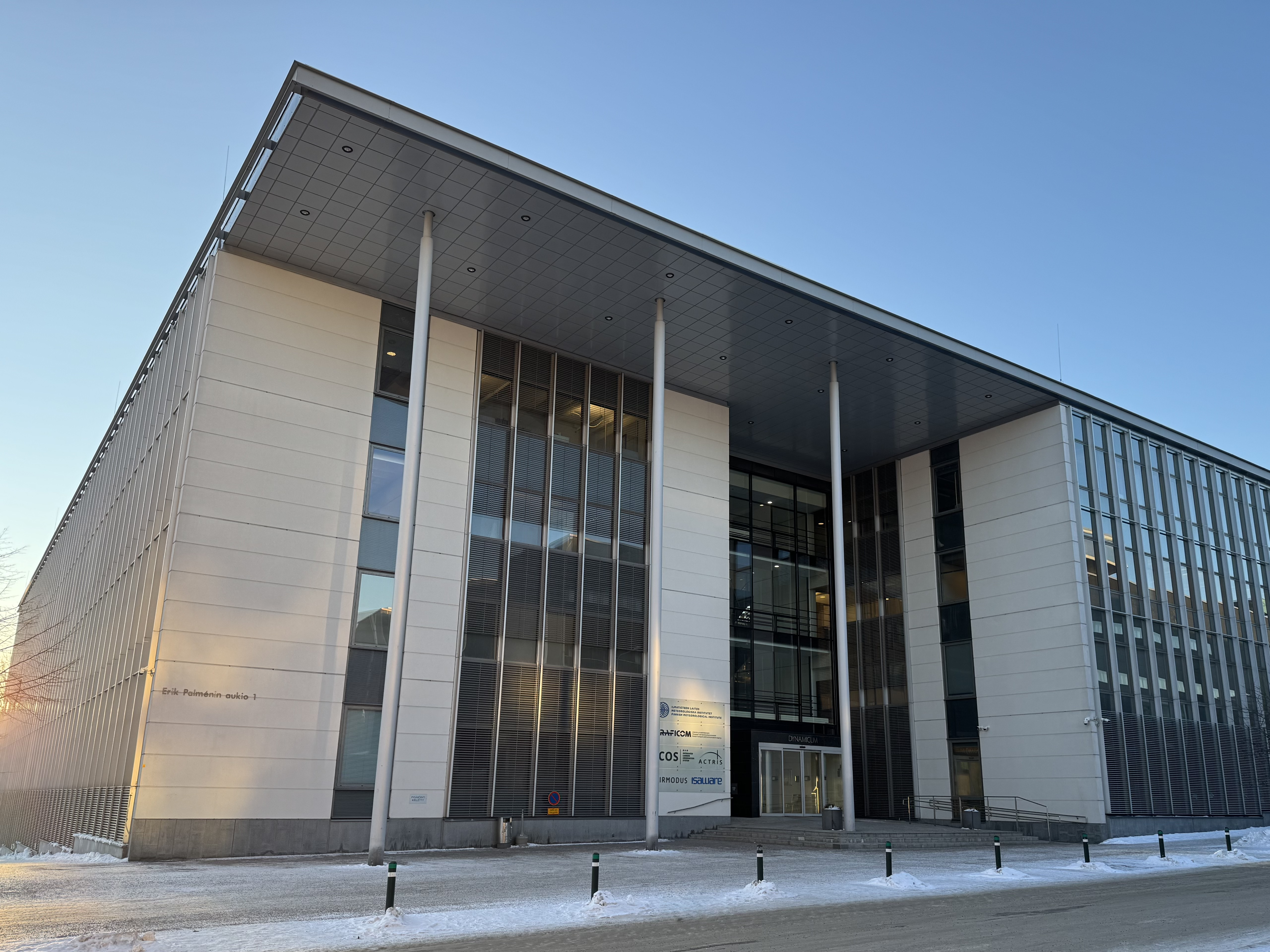
Dynamicum in February 2026

Dynamicum is the name of a building on the Kumpula Campus of the University of Helsinki that is shared by the Finnish Meteorological Institute and the Finnish Institute of Marine Research. Dynamicum is located in Kumpula, Helsinki. Construction on the building was completed in September 2005, at which point in time the Finnish Meteorological Institute and the Finnish Institute of Marine Research moved in. The President of Finland, Tarja Halonen, inaugurated the building in a ceremony on November 8, 2005. Approximately 550 people work in the building.
