= Patola =

Patola may refer to:

- Patola Shahis a Buddhist dynasty
- Patola cloth, a double ikat, usually silk, from Gujarat, western India
- Patola (1973 film), an Indian Punjabi language film
- Patola (1987 film), an Indian Punjabi language film
- Luffa species (Philippine usage)
- Trichosanthes cucumerina (Sinhalese usage)
- Trichosanthes dioica (Portuguese usage)
- Patola, Helsinki, a district of Helsinki, Finland
- "Patola", an Indian Punjabi-language track sung by Bohemia and Guru Randhawa
