= Kumpula Allotment Garden =

Allotment garden in Helsinki, Finland

Coordinates: 60°12′34″N 24°57′15″E

The Kumpula Allotment Garden, located at Kalervonkatu 1a in Kumpula and established in 1927, is the second oldest allotment garden in Helsinki, Finland. The garden has 268 allotments with an average size of 300 m^{2}. This area is culturally and historically valuable. From May 1 to September 15, the garden is open to the public from 7 a.m. to 9 p.m. The allotments themselves, however, are the private property of the garden's members.

The garden area is run by Kumpulan Siirtolapuutarhayhdistys r.y (the Kumpula Allotment Garden Association), which leases allotments to its members. Leaseholders can transfer their lease to a third party. Only people registered as a resident of Helsinki can lease allotments.

A leasehold fee is paid to the city of Helsinki and consumption, administration and membership fees are paid to the association annually by lessees.

The maximum size allowed for allotment cottages is 26 m^{2}. All construction must comply with guidelines stipulated by the city of Helsinki and the association.

The association holds annual events for its members and for the general public. The most visible of these events is its traditional Midsummer celebration.
