= Larin-Kyösti =

Finnish poet

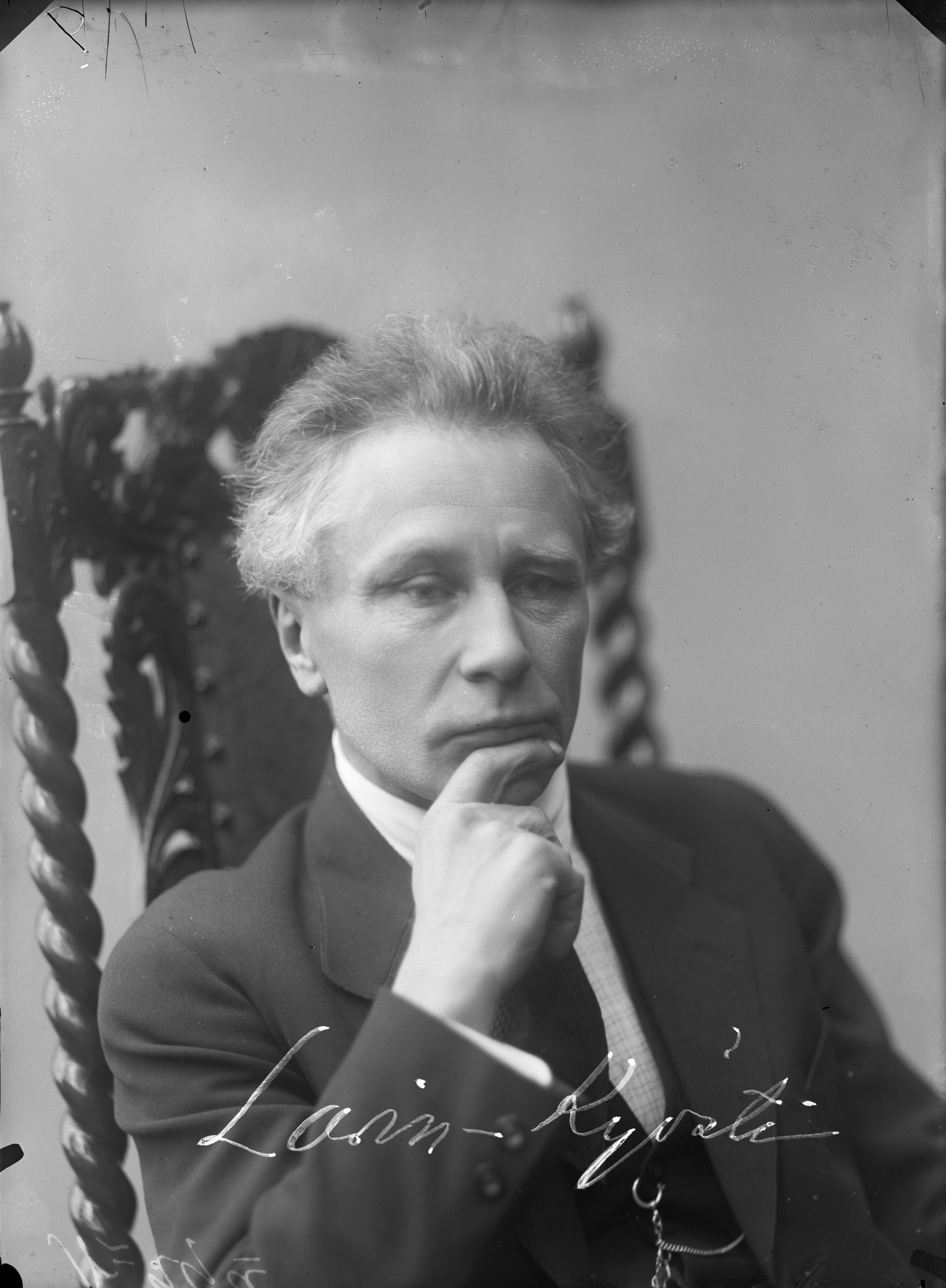

Karl Gustaf Larson (5 June 1873 – 2 December 1948), better known as Larin-Kyösti, was a Finnish poet. Many of his poems have been set to music by Yrjö Kilpinen or by Jean Sibelius (e.g. Kaiutar, op. 72 no. 4).

== Biography ==
Larson was born in Hämeenlinna, Finland. His parents, Gustaf Israel Larson and Sofia Vilhelmina Skog, were both born in Sweden. His father, who operated a restaurant, committed suicide in 1884. Larson started a course of study at the University of Helsinki in 1895. In 1897, he published his first collection of poems, derived from Finnish folk life and nature. Larin-Kyösti's depression was often reflected in his writing. In 1906, he attempted suicide on his way to Italy and was sent to a mental hospital in Florence. He remained a lifetime bachelor. In 1912, he established a residence at Oulunkylä, a suburb and a neighbourhood of Helsinki where he lived for the rest of his life. He died in Oulunkylä in 1948. Larson was buried next to his parents at the Hämeenlinna Cemetery.
