= Koskela =

District of Helsinki, Finland

Coordinates: 60°13′5″N 24°58′0″E

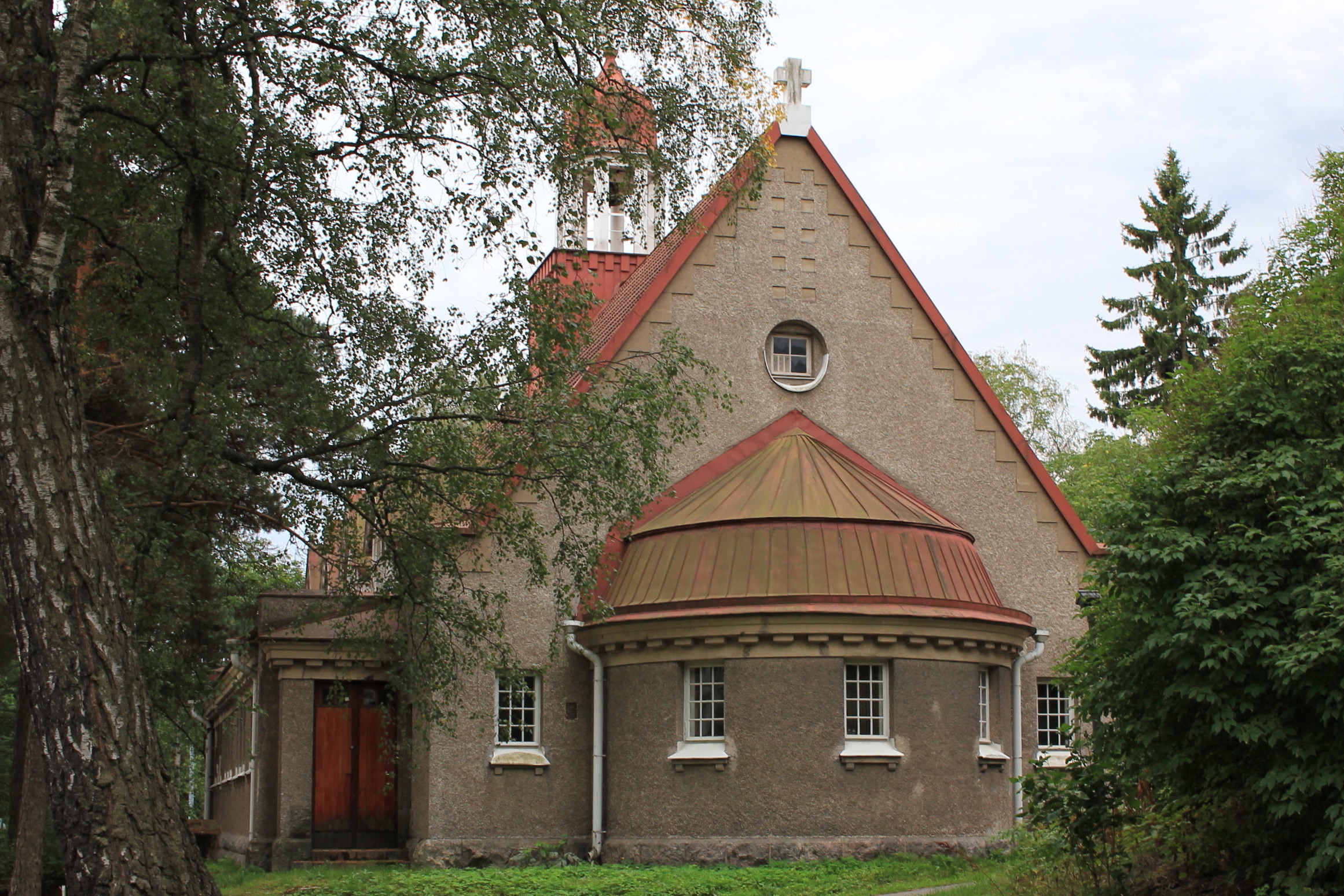
The Koskela Church

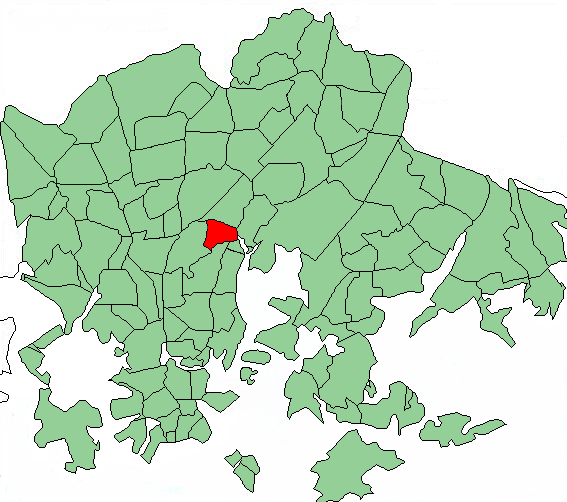
Location in Helsinki

Koskela (Swedish: Forsby, lit. "rapids village") is a district in the city of Helsinki, Finland. There are about 3,300 inhabitants. The borough is surrounded by Käpylä, Kumpula, Vanhakaupunki, and Oulunkylä. Koskela is located in the subdivision of Vanhankaupungin peruspiiri, near the rapids close to the mouth of the Vantaa River. The earliest mention of the human settlement in Koskela dates back to 1417, which makes it the oldest part of Helsinki.

Koskela can be divided into two distinct areas: the small north side dominated by detached housing and the dense south side with apartment buildings. The streets of Puu-Koskela (wooden Koskela) have been named after municipalities in Uusimaa. Before the recession of the 90s, Koskela had many kiosks and stores. After the financial collapse, only one Alepa remained in the center of the apartment building district.

== Koskela teenage murder ==
On December 4, 2020, a teenage murder occurred in Koskela that shocked the entire country. The victim of the homicide was a 16-year-old boy. Police suspect the perpetrators of three boys of the same age who were imprisoned in the Helsinki District Court on December 10 on suspicion of murder. The perpetrators and the victim already knew each other. According to police, the motive for the act was to punish the victim for some previous activity. Prosecutors have demanded an absolute prison sentence for perpetrators of suspected minors.

== Politics ==
Results of the 2011 Finnish parliamentary election in Koskela:

- Social Democratic Party 24.2%
- True Finns 16.8%
- Left Alliance 16.0%
- Green League 15.3%
- National Coalition Party 14.5%
- Centre Party 3.8%
- Christian Democrats 3.2%
- Swedish People's Party 2.4%
