= Maunulanpuisto =

Maunulanpuisto Maunulanpuisto Månsasparken
- Neighborhood of Helsinki
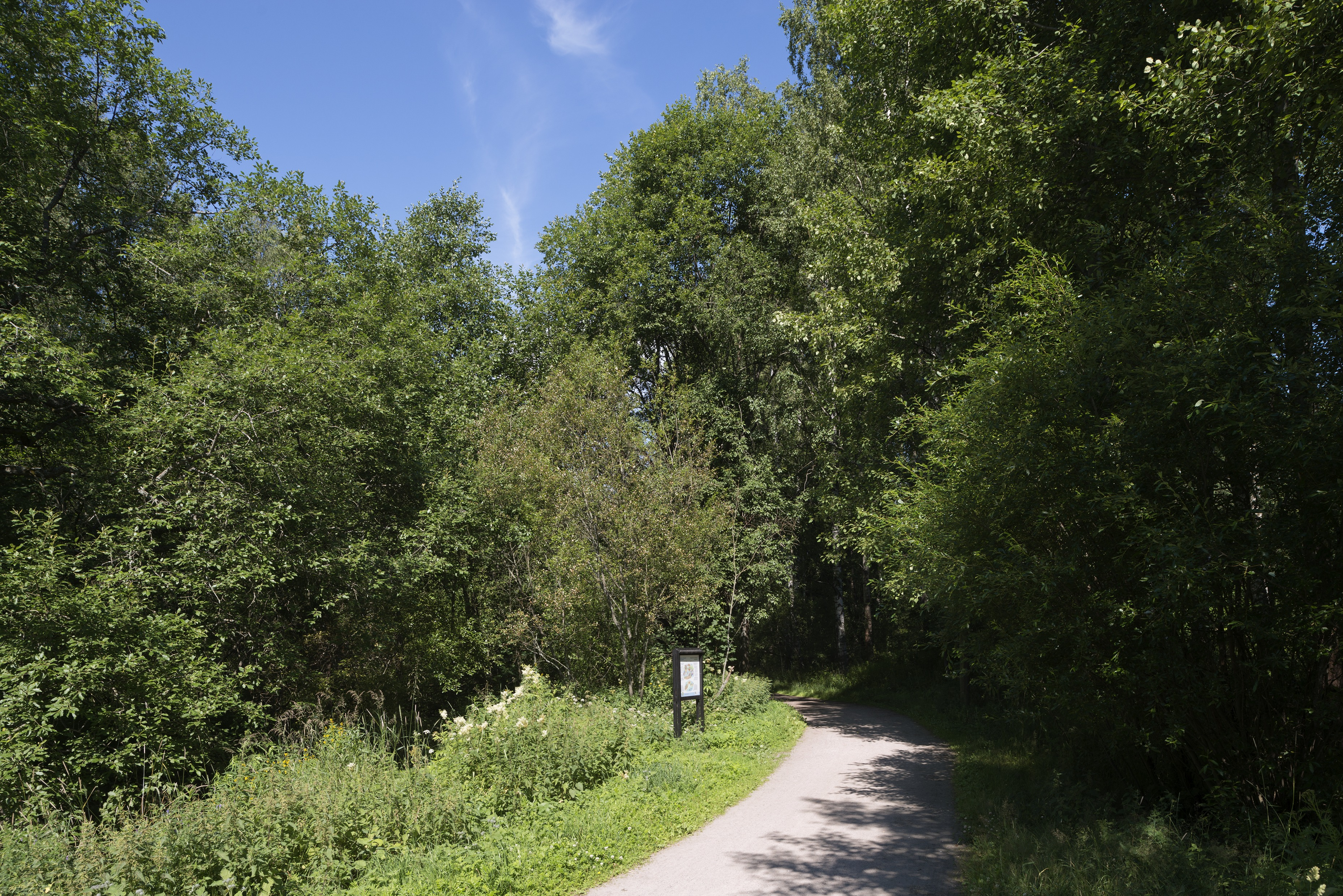
- Maunulanpuisto nature trail

- Location in Helsinki
- Country: Finland
- Province: Southern Finland
- Region: Uusimaa
- Sub-region: Helsinki
- District: North Helsinki
- Sub-district: Oulunkylä

Area
  - Total: 1.23 km^{2} (0.47 sq mi)
- Time zone: UTC+2 (EET)
  - Summer (DST): UTC+3 (EEST)
- Postal code: 00620, 00630

Maunulanpuisto (Finnish) (Månsasparken (Swedish)) is a northwestern neighborhood of Helsinki, Finland.
