= Kumpula =

Helsinki subdivision in Uusimaa, Finland

Coordinates: 60°12′33″N 24°57′52″E

Kumpula Gumtäkt
- Helsinki Subdivision
- Position of Kumpula within Helsinki
- Country: Finland
- Region: Uusimaa
- Sub-region: Greater Helsinki
- Municipality: Helsinki
- District: Central
- Area: 1.53 km^{2} (0.59 sq mi)
- Population (1/1/04): 3,589
  - Density: 2,346/km^{2} (6,080/sq mi)
- Postal codes: 00550, 00560
- Subdivision number: 24
- Neighbouring subdivisions: Pasila, Hermanni, Vallila, Toukola, Käpylä, Koskela, Vanhakaupunki

Kumpula (Swedish: Gumtäkt) is a verdant neighbourhood in Helsinki, bordered by Eastern Pasila to the west, Vallila to the south, Käpylä and Koskela to the north and Toukola and Arabianranta to the east. As of January 1, 2003, Kumpula had approximately 3,600 inhabitants.

The name Gumteckt or Gumtäckt appears already in documents from the 15th century. The current Finnish name Kumpula was given in 1928. Kumpula was incorporated into the city of Helsinki in 1906. The oldest part of Kumpula, around the long street Limingantie, consists of wooden houses built in the 1920s and 1930s. Around the university campus and in the western part of Kumpula are newer apartment buildings built in and after the 1980s. HOAS has built student housing in the area.

The area is also home to one of the four campuses of the University of Helsinki, the Kumpula Campus, where approximately 6,000 students study at the Faculty of Science. In addition, the Dynamicum building, shared by the Finnish Meteorological Institute and the Finnish Environment Institute, is located on the campus.

The Kumpula Manor is an old manor house now housing the university's geological museum, and surrounded by a botanical garden. Nearby is one of Helsinki's numerous gardening allotments, the Kumpula Allotment Garden. Kumpula is also home to the Kumpula Outdoor Swimming Pool, which was built for the 1952 Summer Olympics.

== Politics ==
Results of the 2011 Finnish parliamentary election in Kumpula:

- Green League 24.4%
- Left Alliance 23.5%
- Social Democratic Party 18.2%
- National Coalition Party 11.9%
- True Finns 9.7%
- Centre Party 3.9%
- Christian Democrats 2.3%
- Swedish People's Party 2.1%

== Gallery ==
Image gallery

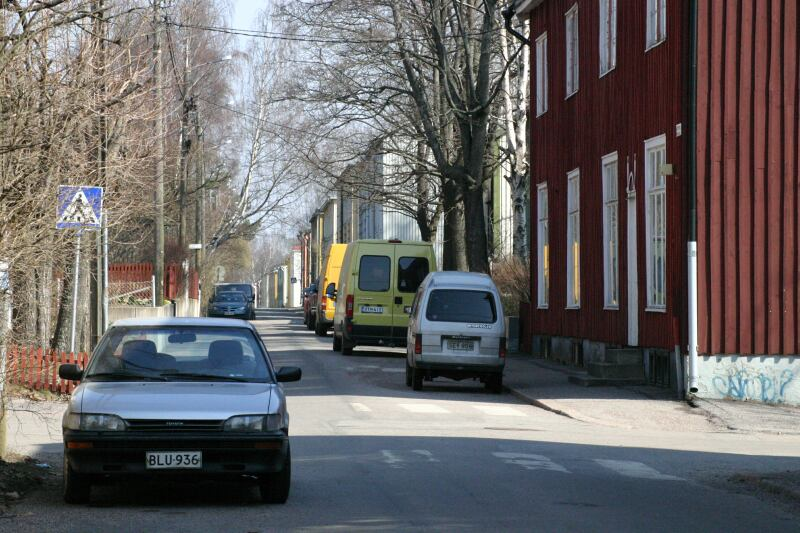
Limingantie

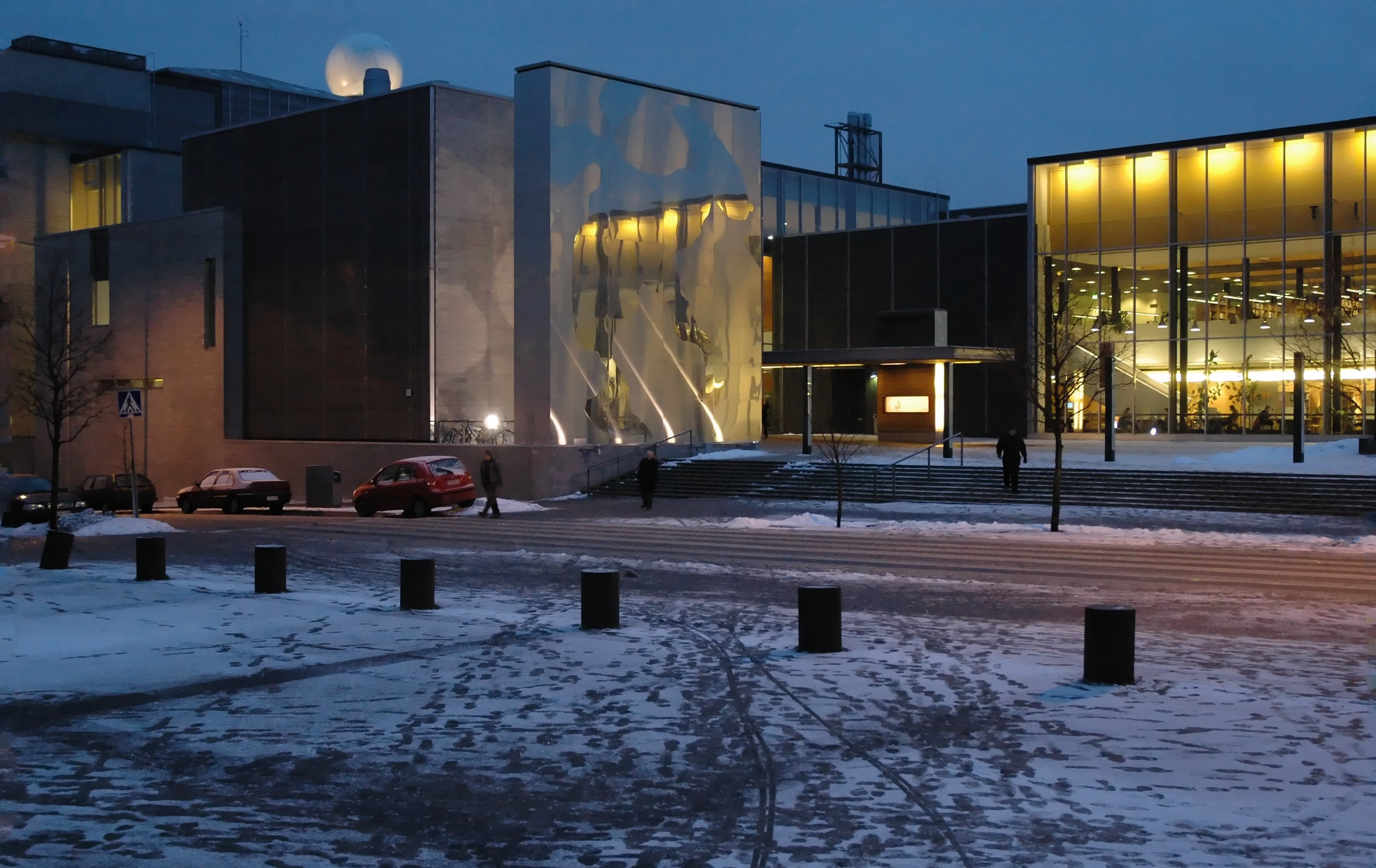
The Physicum building at Kumpula Science Campus in winter.
