= Toukola =

Neighbourhood of Helsinki, Finland

Coordinates: 60°12′24″N 24°58′23″E

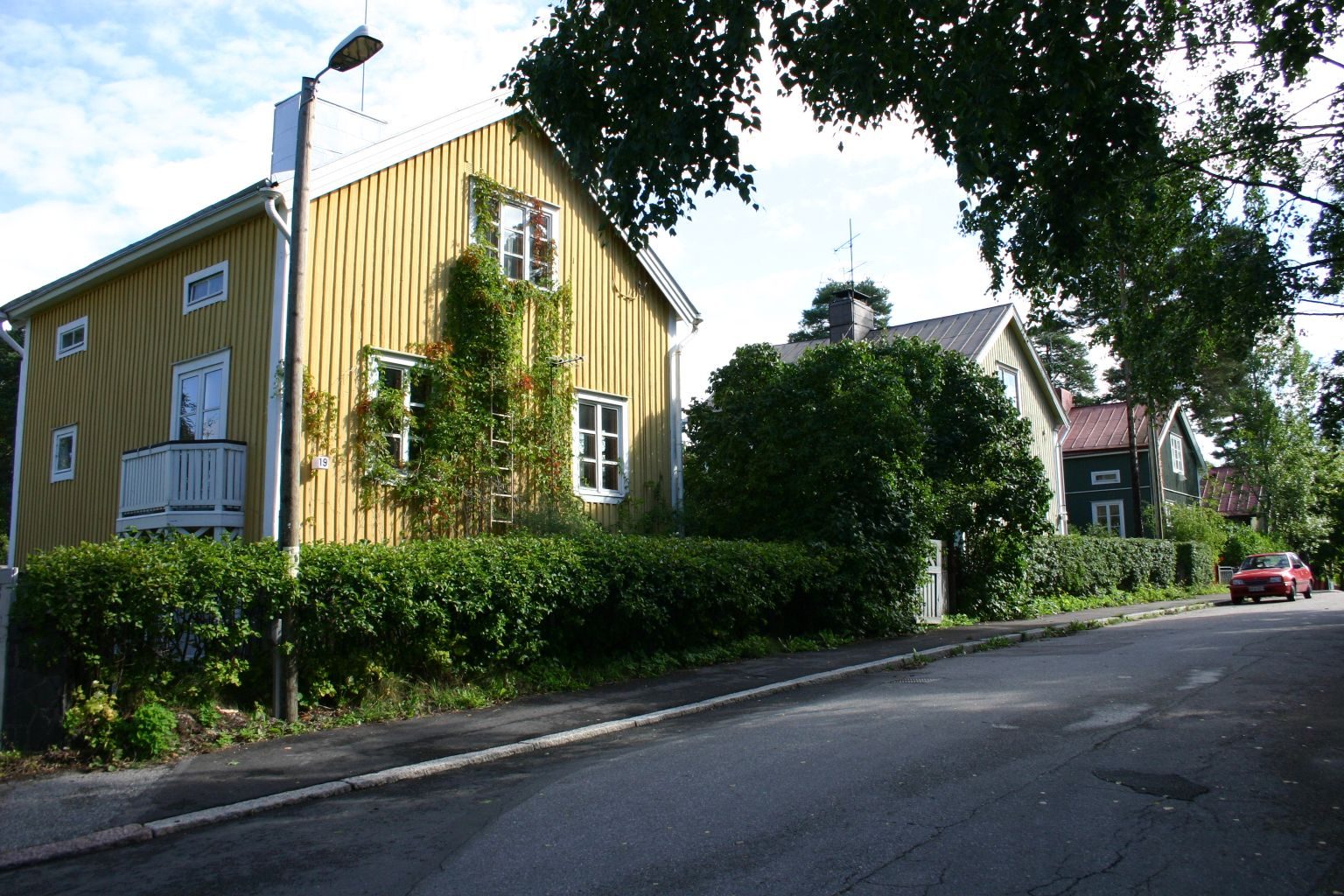
Toukola

Toukola (Swedish: Majstad) is a neighbourhood of Helsinki, Finland, around 4 km north of the town centre, at the port of Vanhankaupunginlahti. Toukola is part of the administrative region of Vanhakaupunki.

The eldest part of the town consists mostly of wooden villas and small houses. Next to the sea, in later years, the newer area of Arabianranta was built, with modern tower blocks.

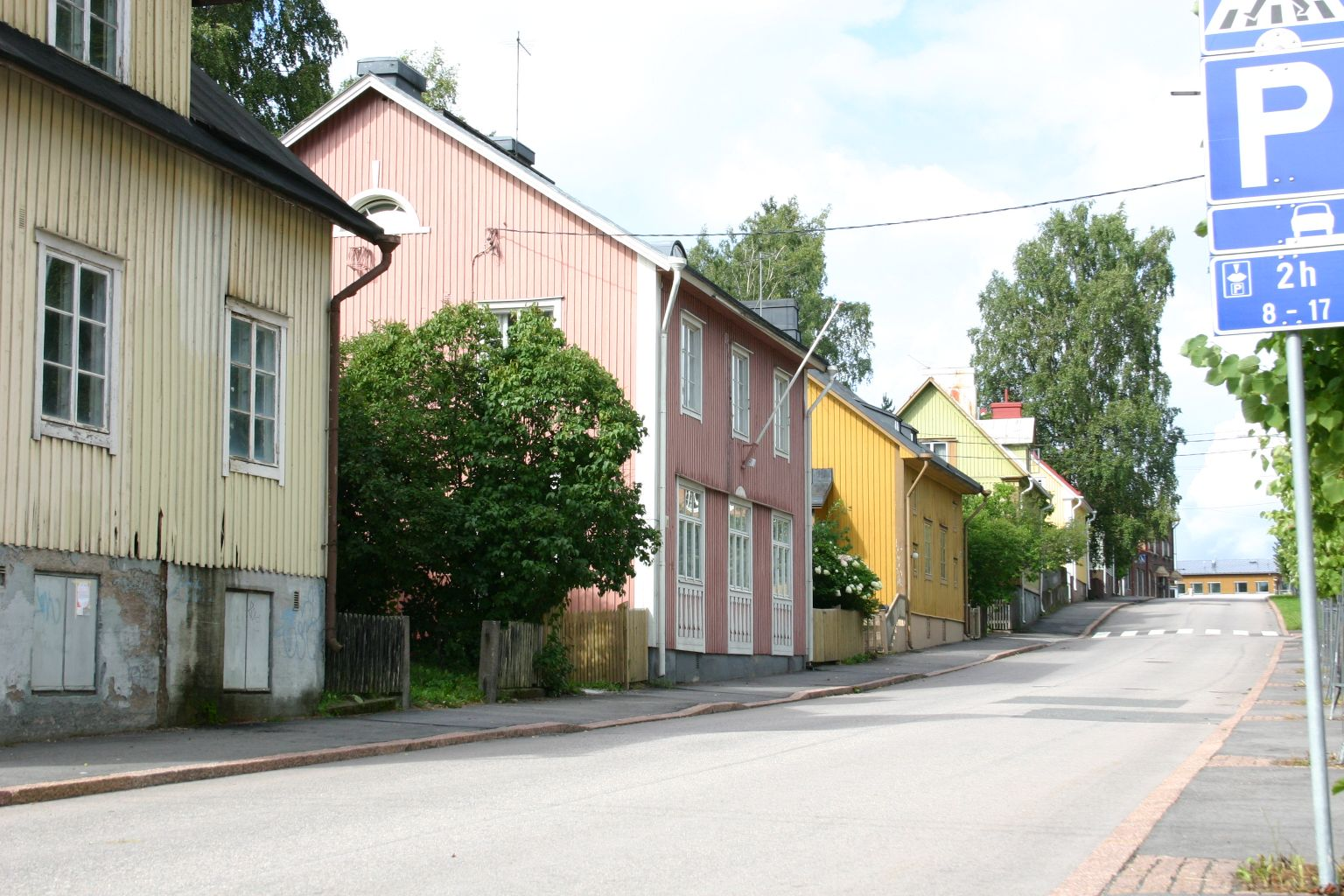
Street in Toukola
