= Käpylä =

Coordinates: 60°12′52″N 24°57′2″E

Käpylä Kottby
- Helsinki Subdivision
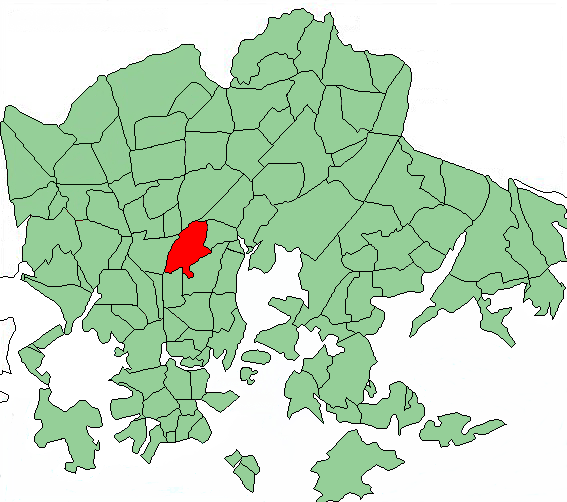
- Position of Käpylä within Helsinki
- Country: Finland
- Region: Uusimaa
- Sub-region: Greater Helsinki
- Municipality: Helsinki
- District: Central
- Area: 1.77 km^{2} (0.68 sq mi)
- Population (1.1.2015): 8 089
  - Density: 4,570/km^{2} (11,800/sq mi)
- Postal codes: 00610 and 00600
- Subdivision number: 25
- Neighbouring subdivisions: Kumpula, Pasila, Metsälä, Patola, Veräjämäki, Koskela

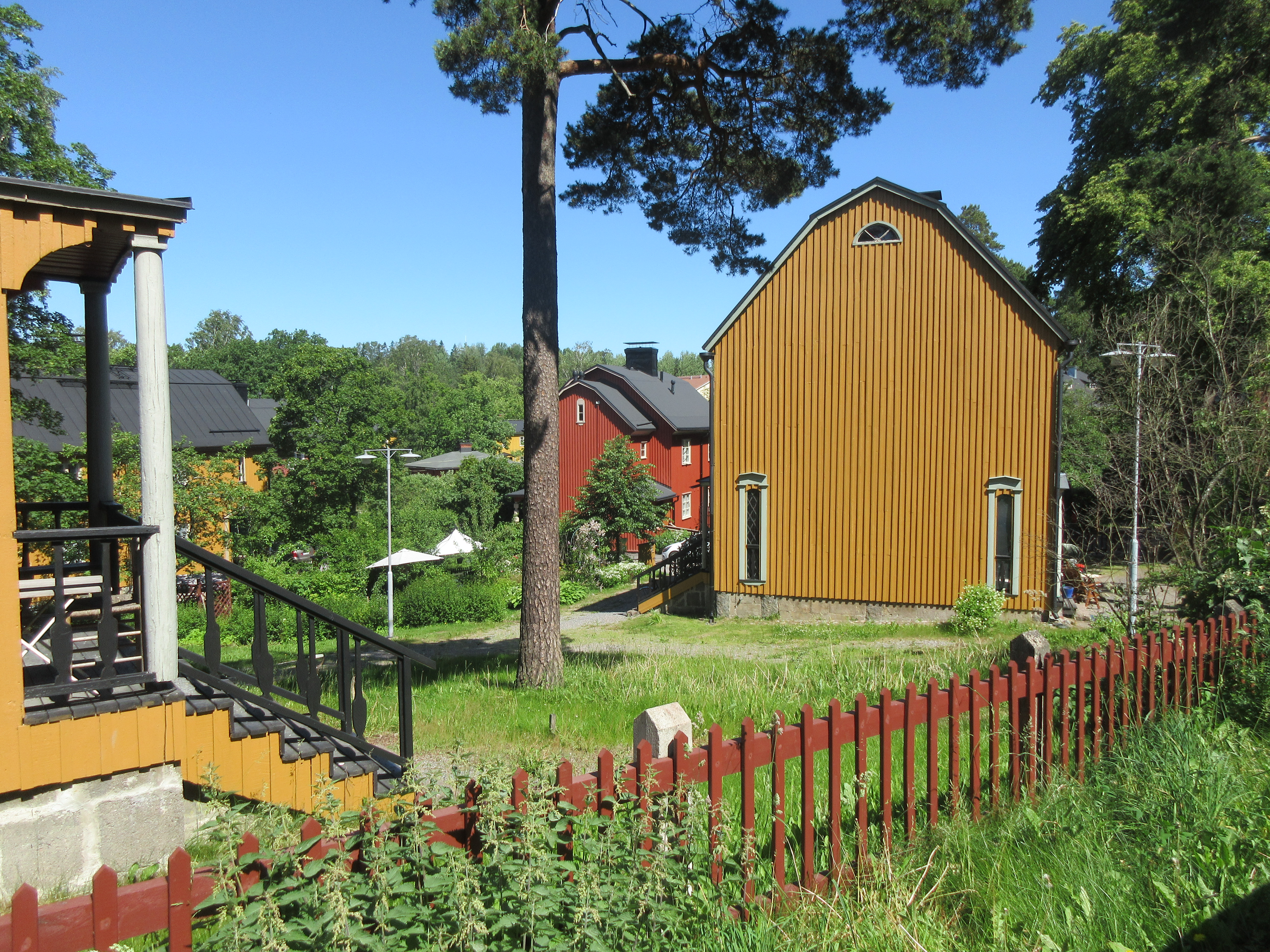
Käpylä is known for its natural atmosphere and old wooden houses.

Käpylä (Finnish: [ˈkæpylæ]; Swedish: Kottby) is a neighbourhood of Helsinki with 7,600 inhabitants. Administratively speaking, Käpylä is a part of the Vanhakaupunki district.

It is located between Kumpula, Oulunkylä and Koskela. Käpylä has a terminus for route-1 of the Helsinki tram network. Additionally, the Olympic Village built for the 1952 Summer Olympics and another village for the cancelled 1940 Summer Olympics are located in Käpylä. The Park Hotel, located in Käpylä, became known for being the shooting location of the popular Finnish satirical TV series Hyvät herrat. One of the two lyceum schools situated in Käpylä has a specific orientation towards students with an interest in the natural sciences.

Tram lines 1 and 1T as well as buses heading along the Tuusulanväylä freeway bus lines travel to Käpylä. The K, T, I and P trains of the Helsinki commuter rail system stop at Käpylä railway station.

There are smaller regions inside Käpylä, Puu-Käpylä (wood-Käpylä) and Taivaskallio.

== Puu-Käpylä ==
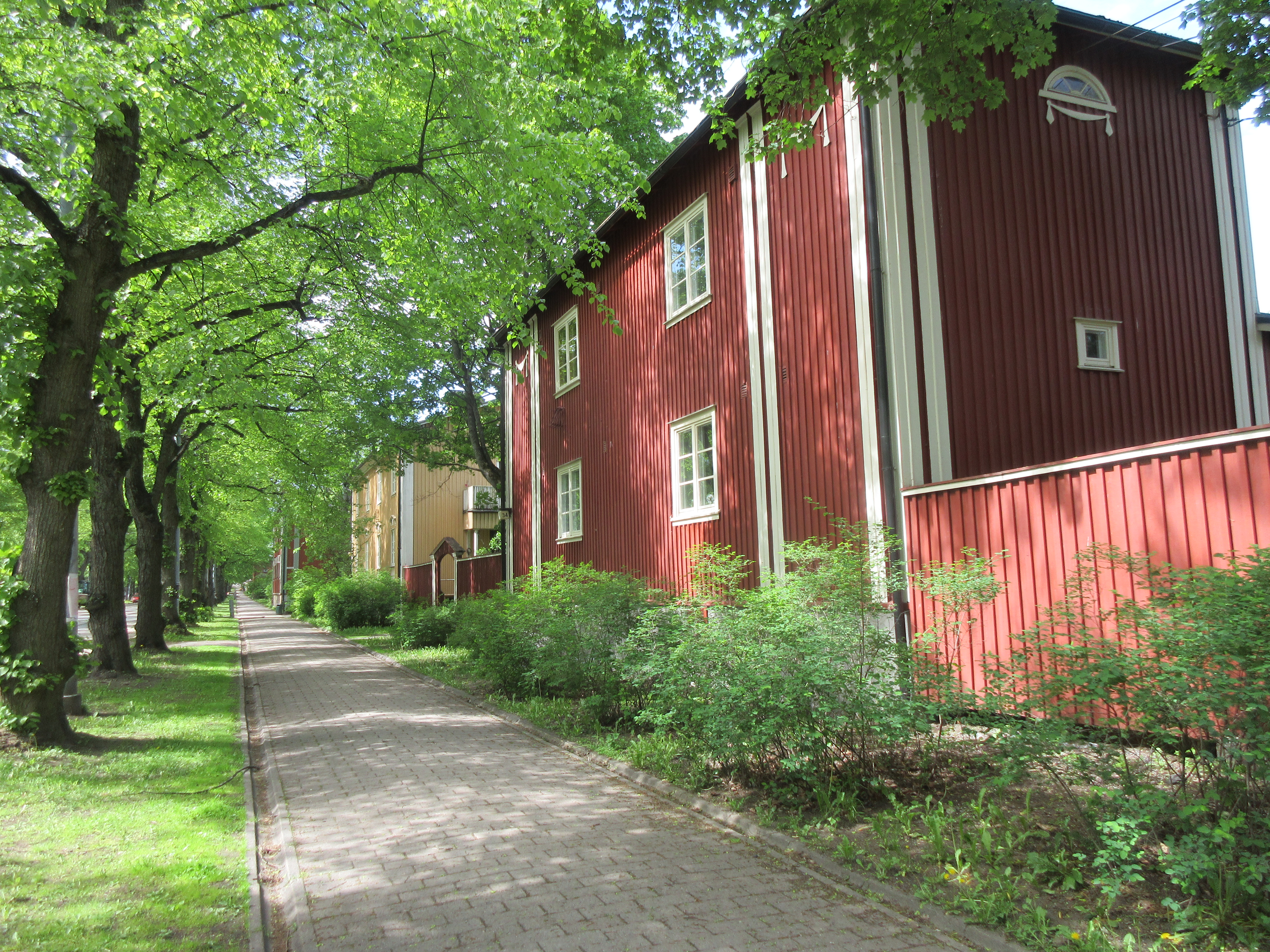
Puu-Käpylä

Puu-Käpylä [‘wood Käpylä'] (Swedish ‘Trä-Kottby') is well known as the earliest example in Finland of the Garden City Movement. The suburb of wooden buildings, planned by Akseli Toivonen and designed by Martti Välikangas, was built between 1920 and 1925 and designed in the so-called Nordic Classicism style prevalent throughout the Nordic countries at the time. Puu-Käpylä was a model workers' housing area, built at a time when there was a bad housing problem for workers in the city. The construction follows the typical Finnish vernacular method: square-log construction then faced in weatherboarding. However, the whole process was partly industrialized, and the area is regarded as the first prefabricated housing area in Finland. The mostly 2-storey semi-detached timber houses are arranged around sheltered courtyards, where originally the tenants' vegetable gardens were sited. The colours vary slightly from one house to another, but with a dominance of traditional red ochre. The area is still mostly occupied by working-class families though it has also been a popular residential area for professional types, especially architects – and it also has become a favourite tourist attraction.

Välikangas, together with architect Hilding Ekelund, also participated in the design of the Olympic Village situated in Käpylä.

Käpylä was incorporated into the city of Helsinki in 1906.

== Sports ==
Football club Käpylän Pallo plays in Ykkösliiga, the second tier of football in Finland. The city was part of the road cycling event for the 1952 Summer Olympics. Amateur football club Käpylä Maanantai play their home matches in Käpylä.
