= Vanhankaupunginselkä =

Bay in Helsinki, Finland

Coordinates: 60°12′N 025°00′E

Designations

Ramsar Wetland
- Official name: Vanhankaupunginlahti, Laajalahti
- Designated: 28 May 1974
- Reference no.: 9

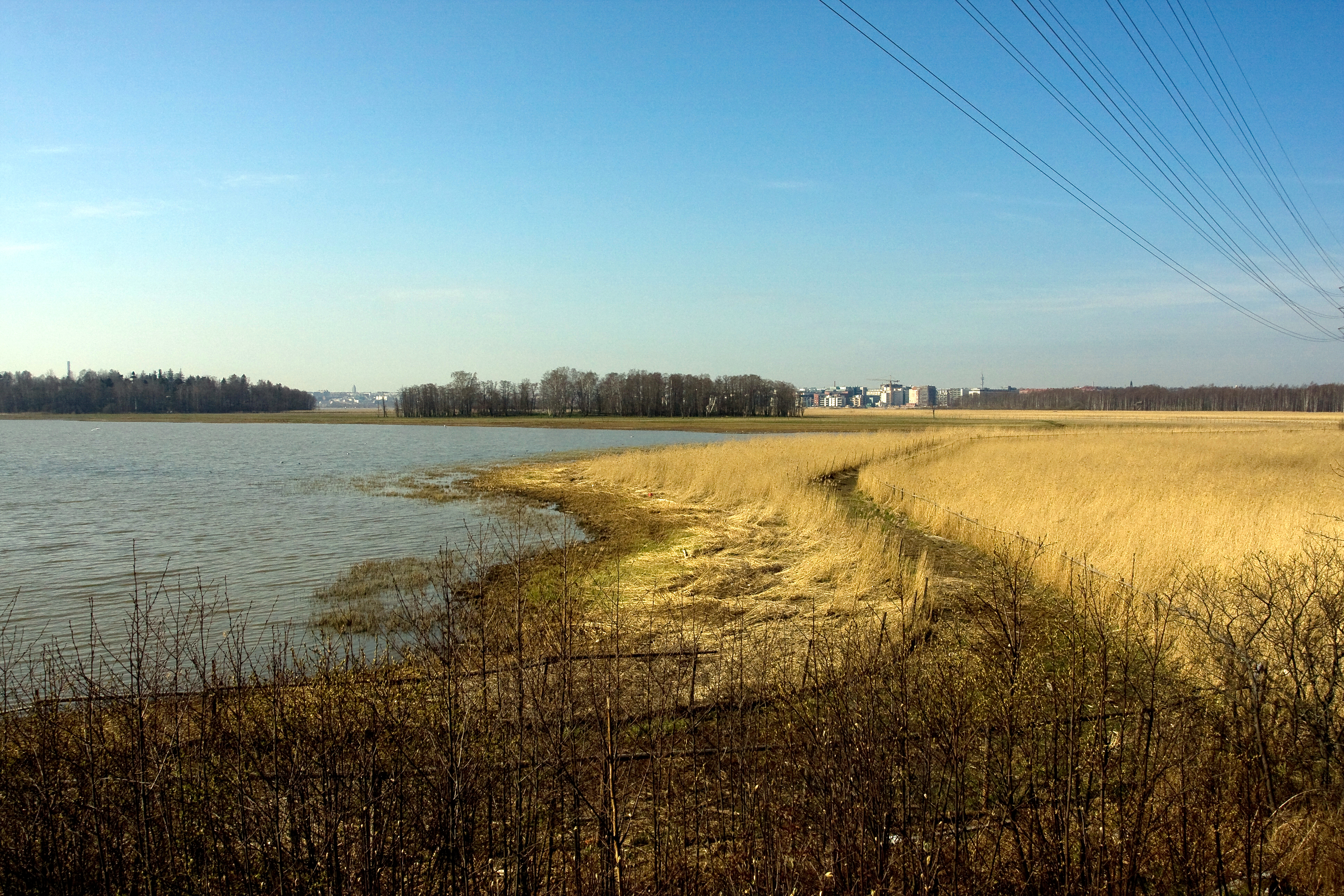
General area

Vanhankaupunginselkä (also called Vanhankaupunginlahti, Swedish: Gammelstadsfjärden) is a bay area which together with parts of adjoining Viikki district constitute a natural conservation zone near downtown Helsinki in the southern part of Finland. The area is listed in Ramsar Convention on Wetlands of International Importance, is part of European Union's Natura 2000 programme and is also listed as BirdLife International's Important Bird Area.

Geographically the area lies east of Helsinki peninsula and is surrounded by the districts of Hermanni, Arabianranta, Viikki, Herttoniemi and Kulosaari. The Vantaa River ends at the north end of Vanhankaupunginselkä.

Although the area appears to be either land or water on various maps or satellite pictures, it is largely marsh-like, impassable either on foot or on boat. Most parts of the area are covered with reeds as tall as a person, which will prevent the use of boats, while the subsoil beneath the reeds is soft and muddy, thus preventing passage on foot.

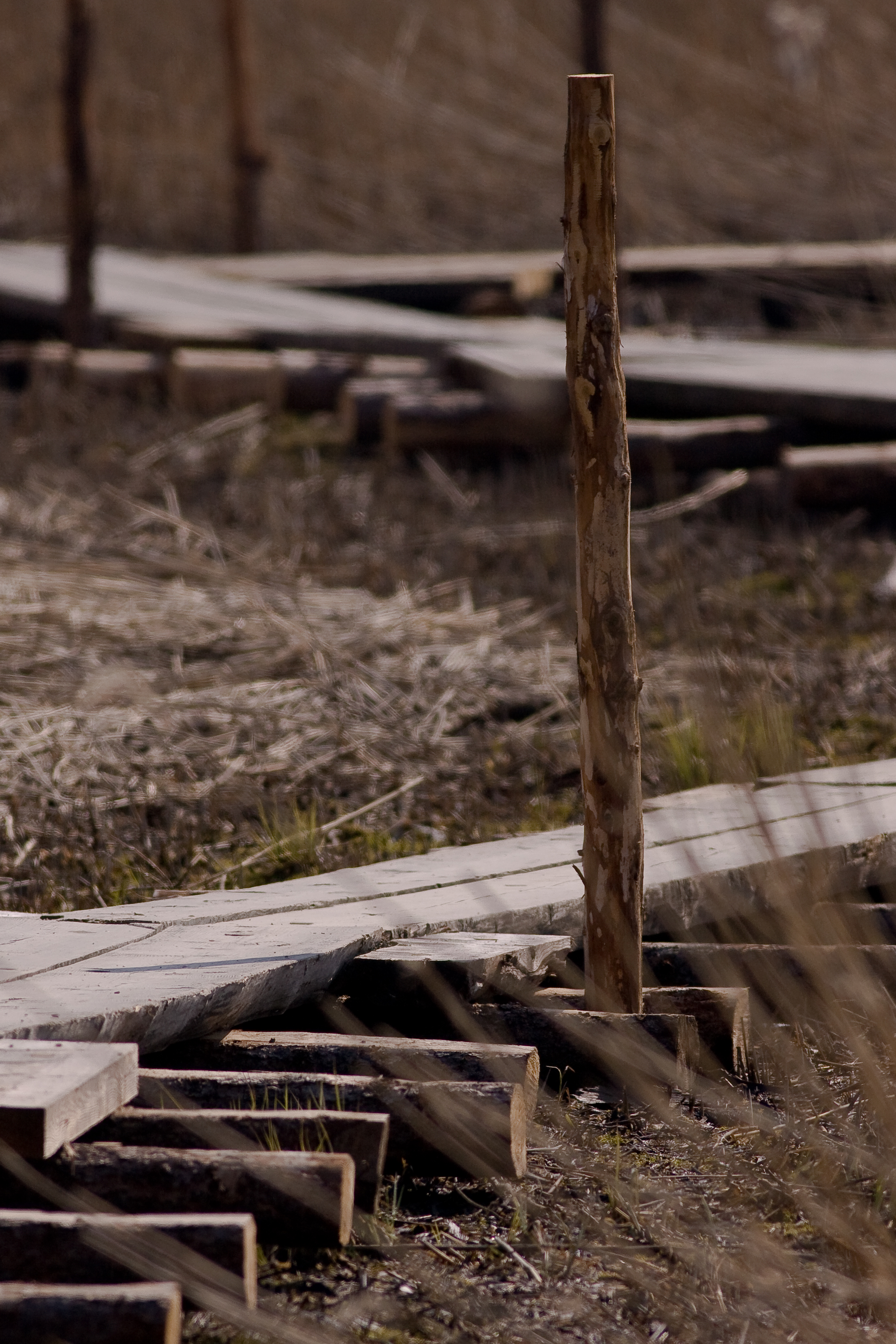
Duckboards on the area

However, for the purposes of walking between the reeds the City of Helsinki has constructed some duckboards, which permit the visitors to the area to walk between the reeds. While these duckboards permit the visitors to walk between the reeds, the duckboards are just two to four planks wide, which require the visitors to apply appropriate caution in general and while passing other visitors. During times of higher water, the duckboards can be submerged in whole or in part, while in winter, the boards can be warped or destroyed by ice.

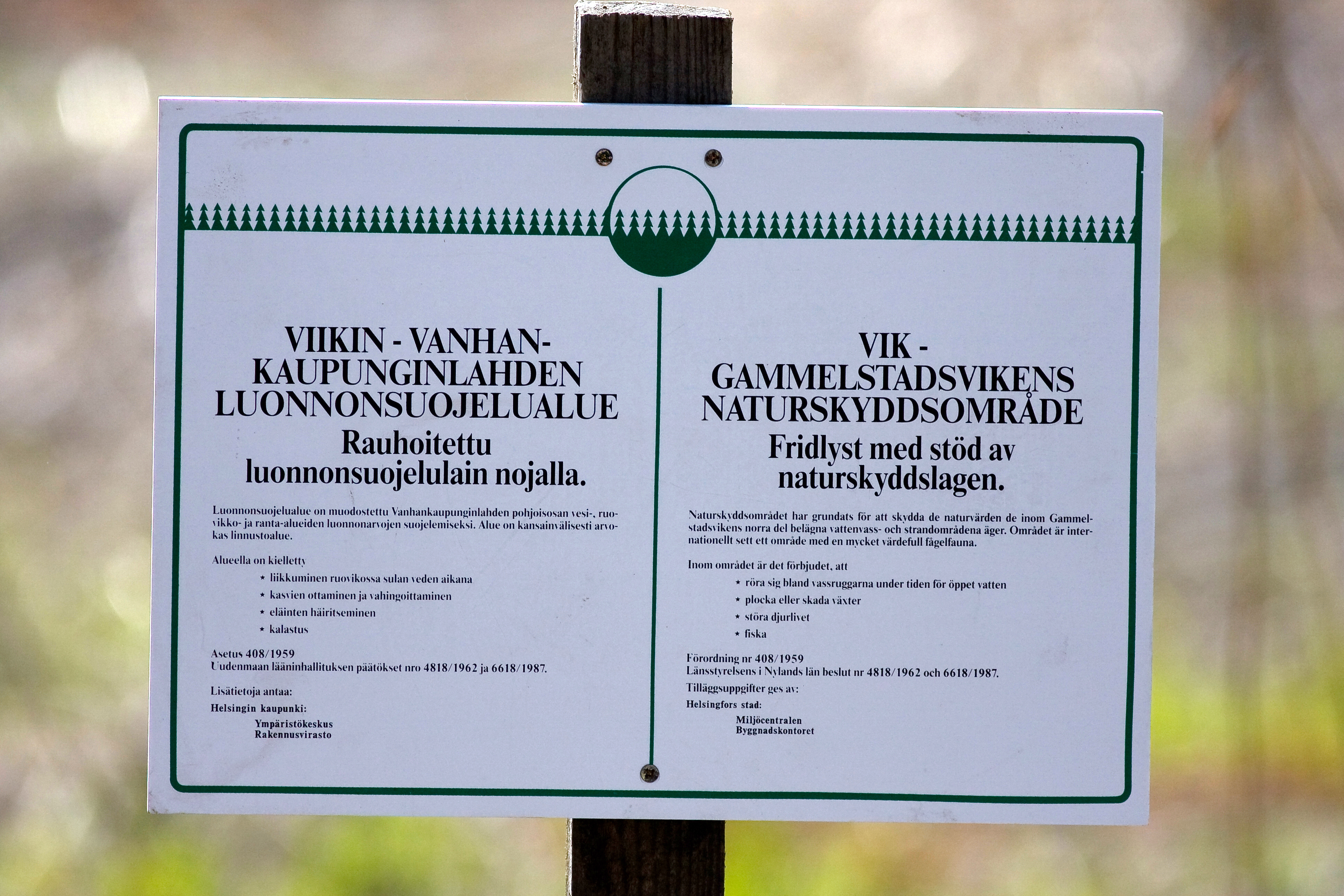
Prohibition sign, stipulating: "Conservation Zone. Do not move between the reeds while the area is unfrozen, collect or damage the foliage or disturb animals in general, do not fish." The text on the right is in Swedish.

As for the bird species in the area, 285 different species have been observed in the area. Out of these species, 114 have nested in the area during the last 10 years.

Certain bird species rare in Finland nest in the area. Examples of these are the western marsh harrier, Eurasian bittern, white-backed woodpecker, red-backed shrike, ortolan bunting and black woodpecker.

As for other species, various predators such as hawks and owls are frequently observed in the area.

The rules applicable to visitors of Vanhankaupunginselkä are fairly strict. As per the instructions printed on the signs all over the area, visitors in the area are not permitted to move between the reeds while the area is unfrozen, collect or damage the foliage or disturb animals in general. In addition, fishing is not permitted in the area, nor is walking unleashed dogs or horse riding. Furthermore, as Vanhankaupunginselkä is frequently visited by persons interested in nature, informal social control is strict. Littering, loud behaviour and comparable activities are typically strongly condemned.

Visitors can commute to the area either by cars, trams or buses. Trams 6 and 8 have stops less than a kilometre from the area and various locations near the area offer ample parking space.

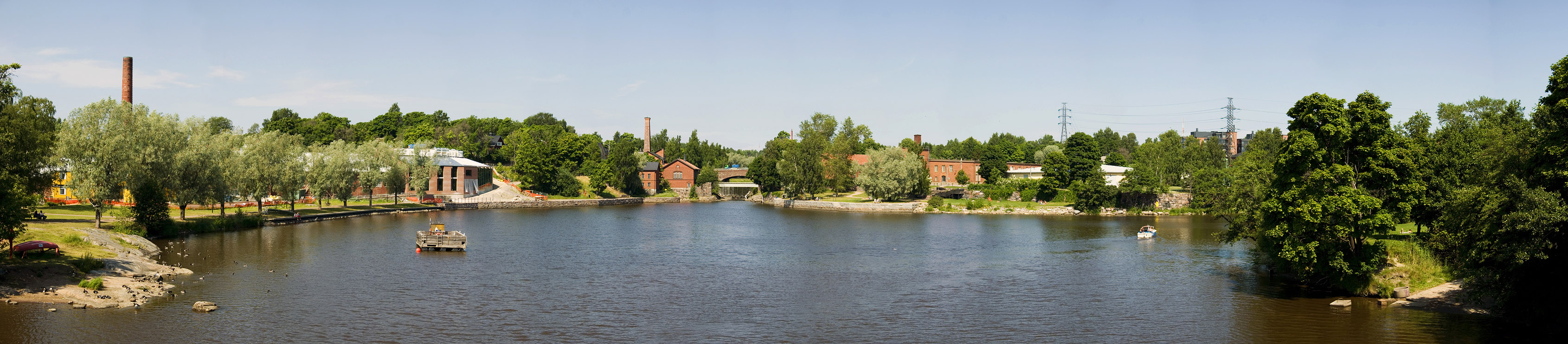

== Birds at Vanhankaupunginselkä and Viikki Area ==
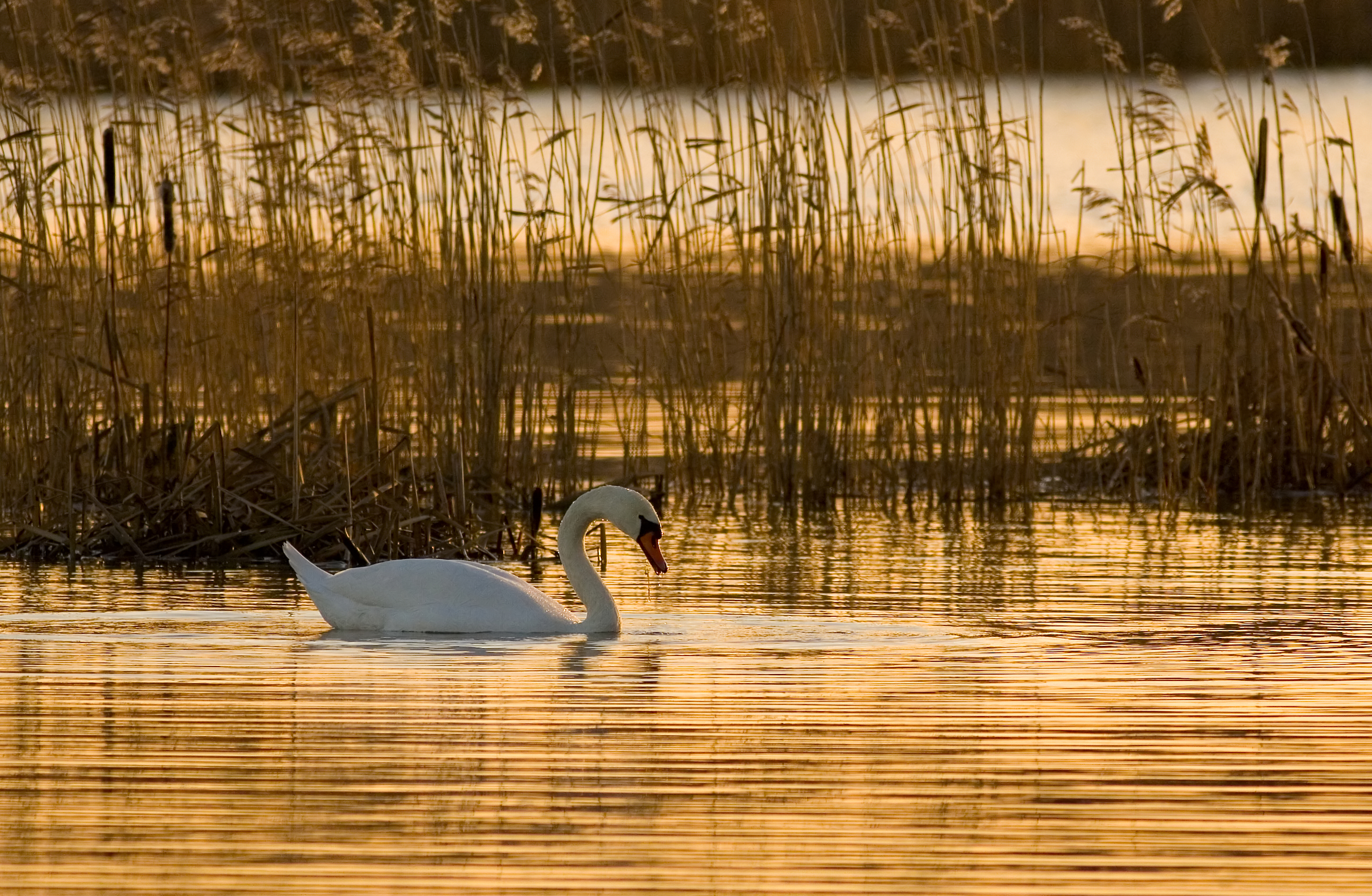
Mute swan

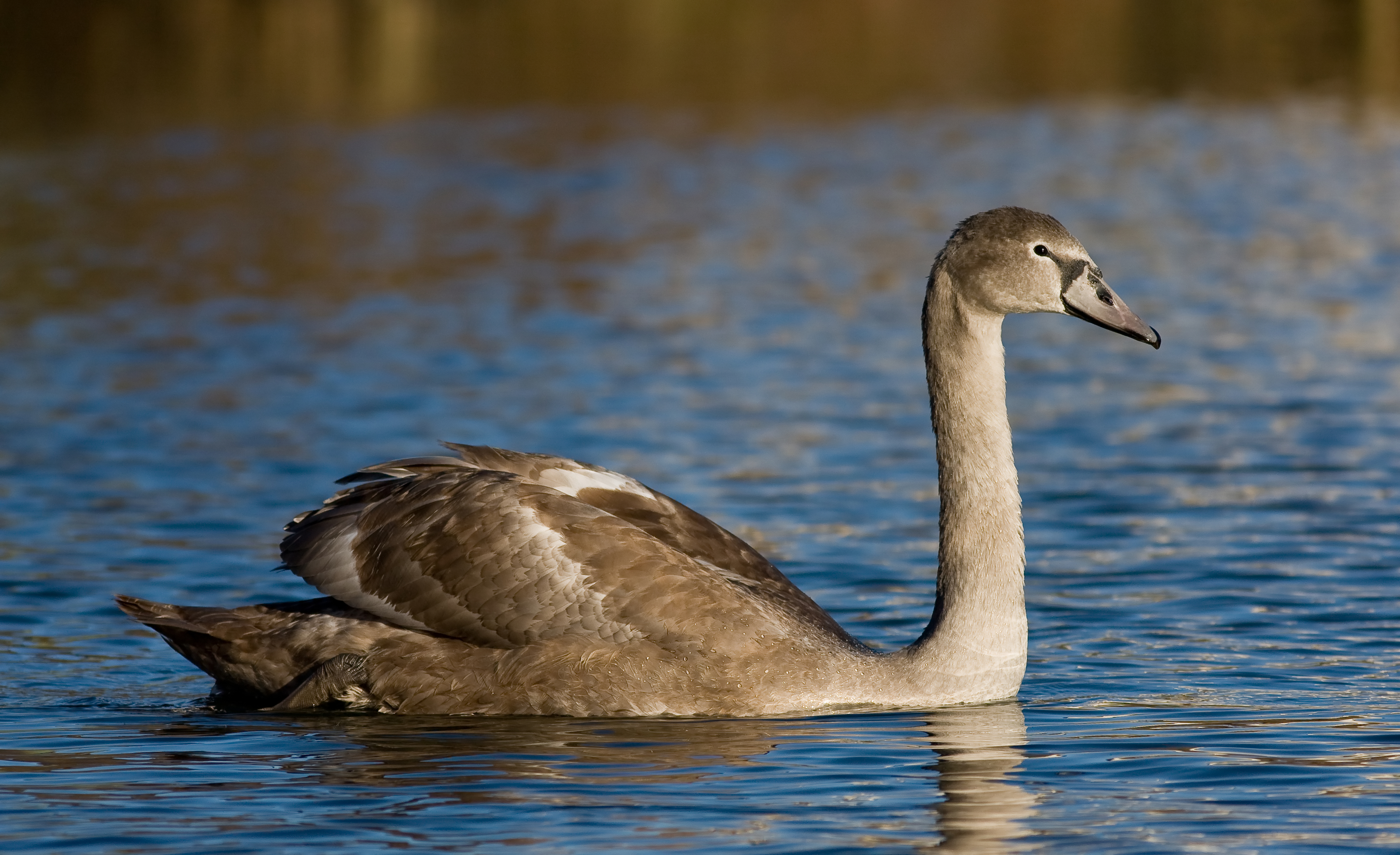
Juvenile mute swan

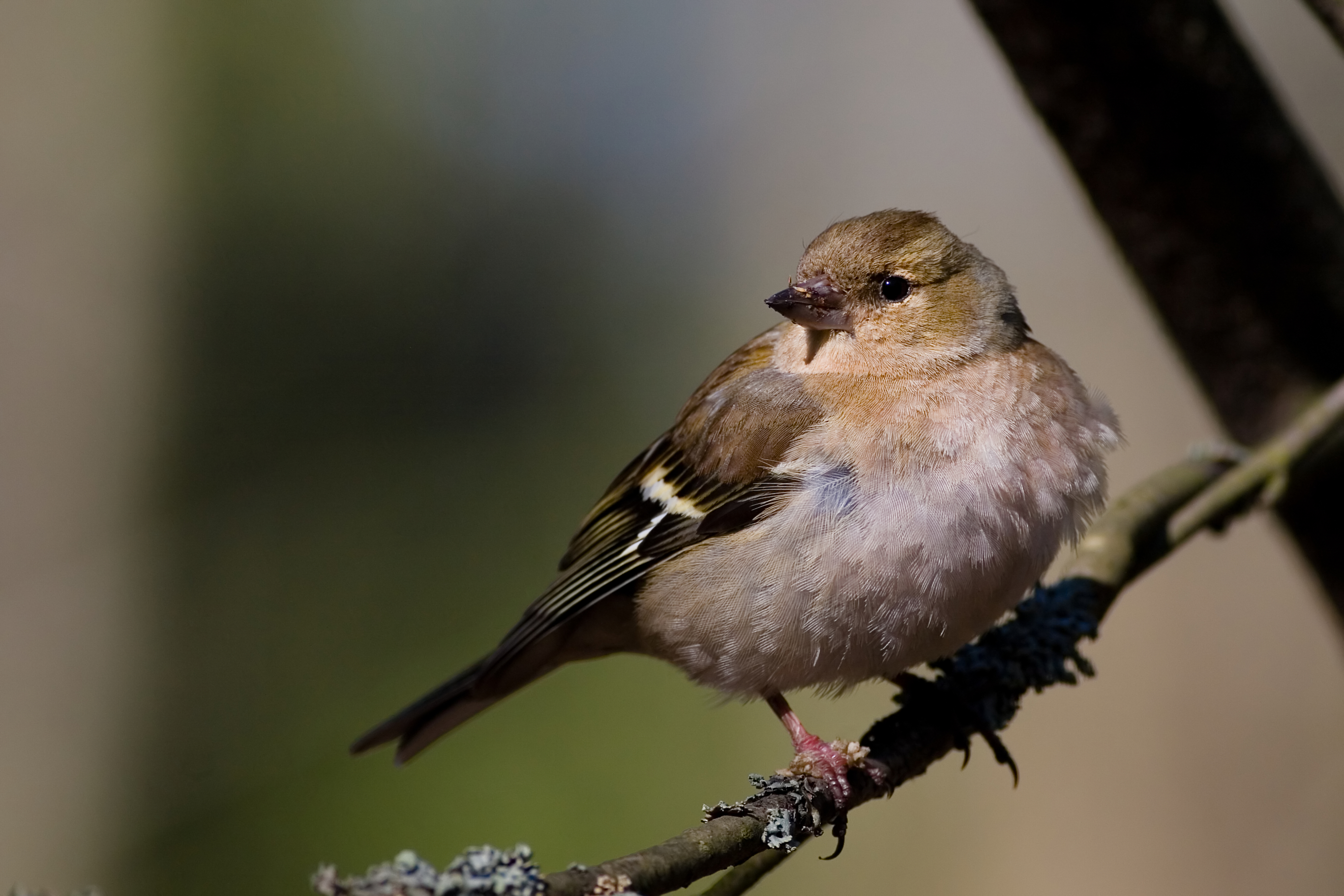
Common chaffinch (female)

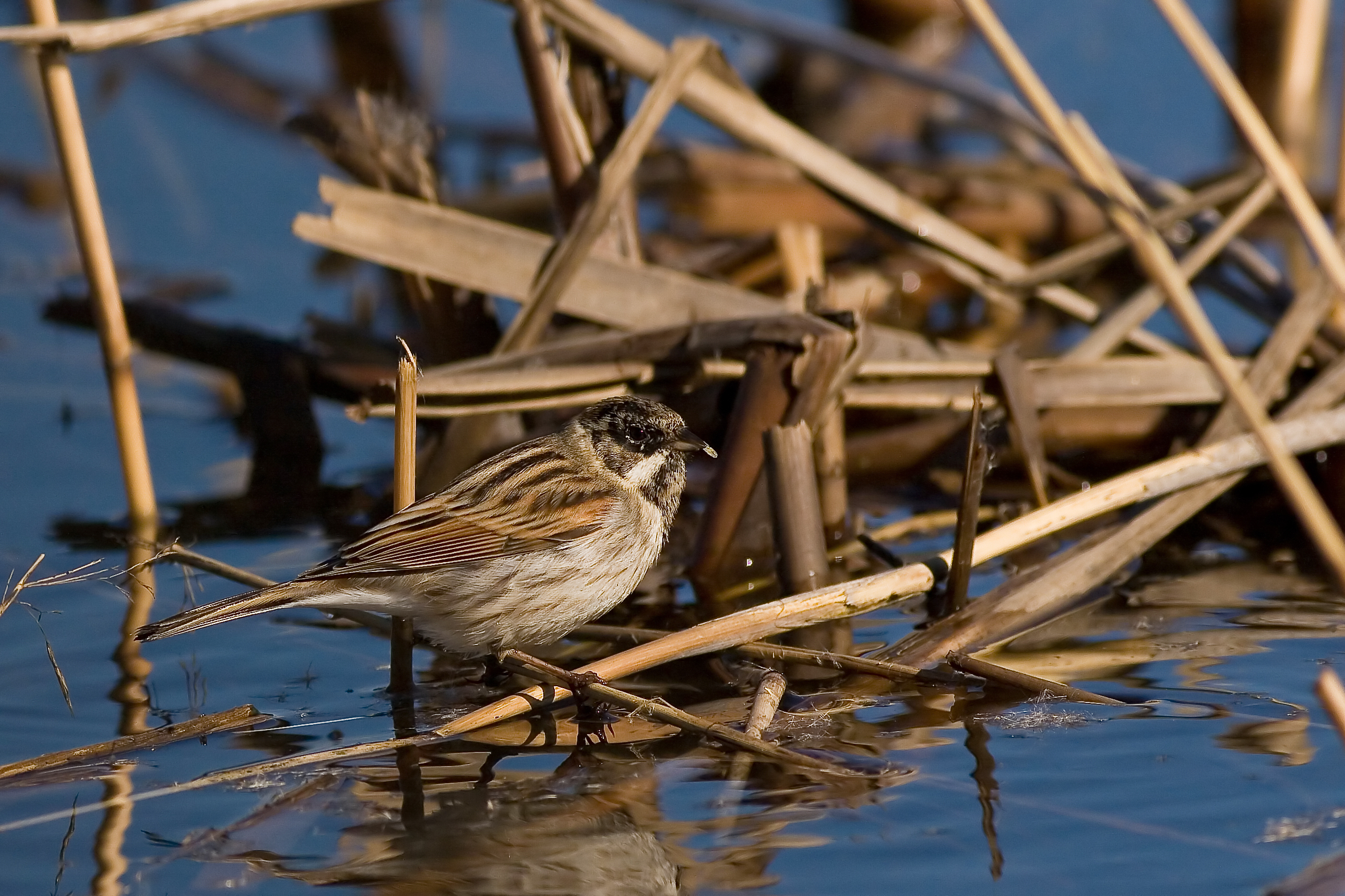
Reed bunting

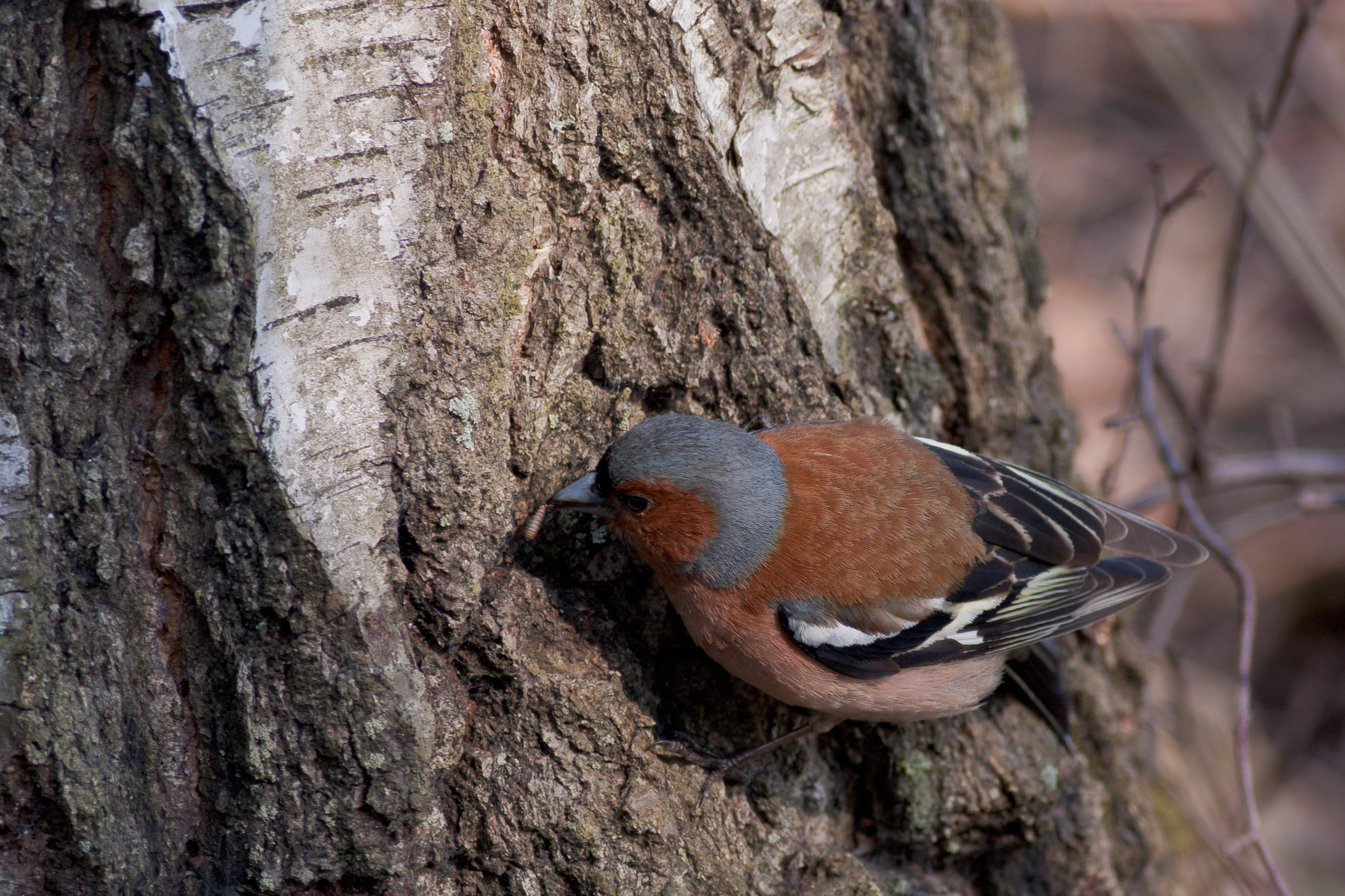
Common chaffinch

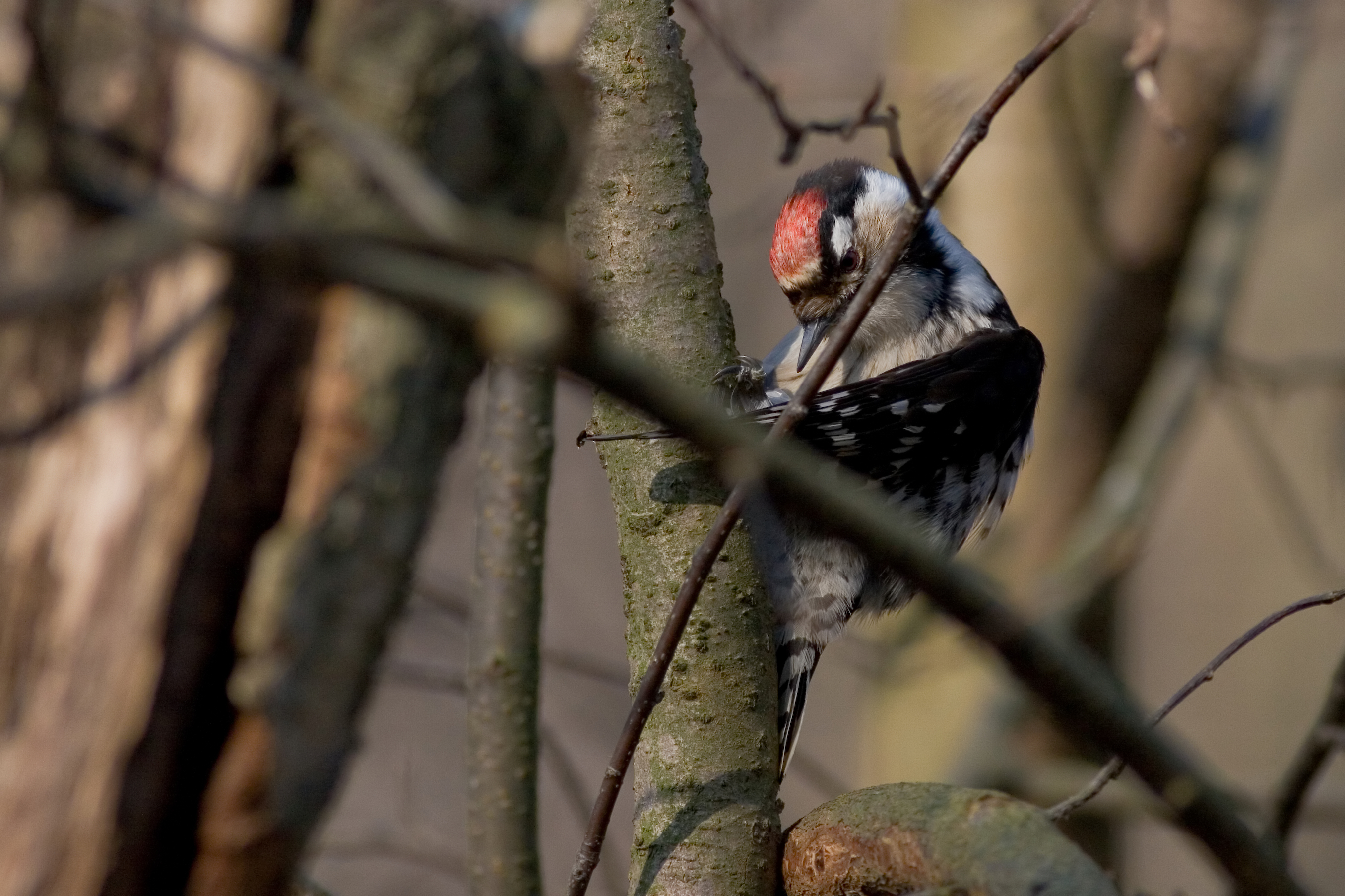
Lesser spotted woodpecker

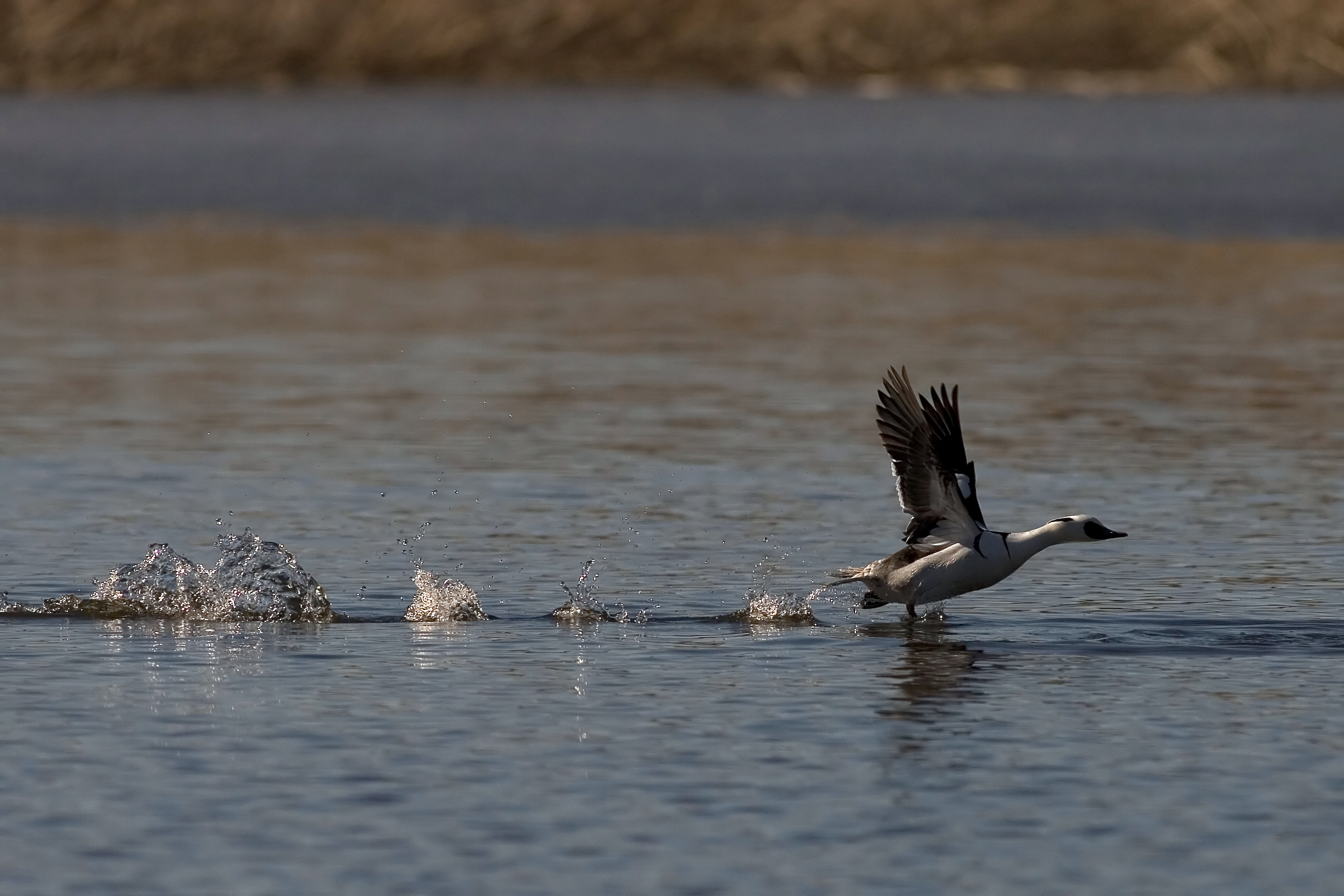
Smew

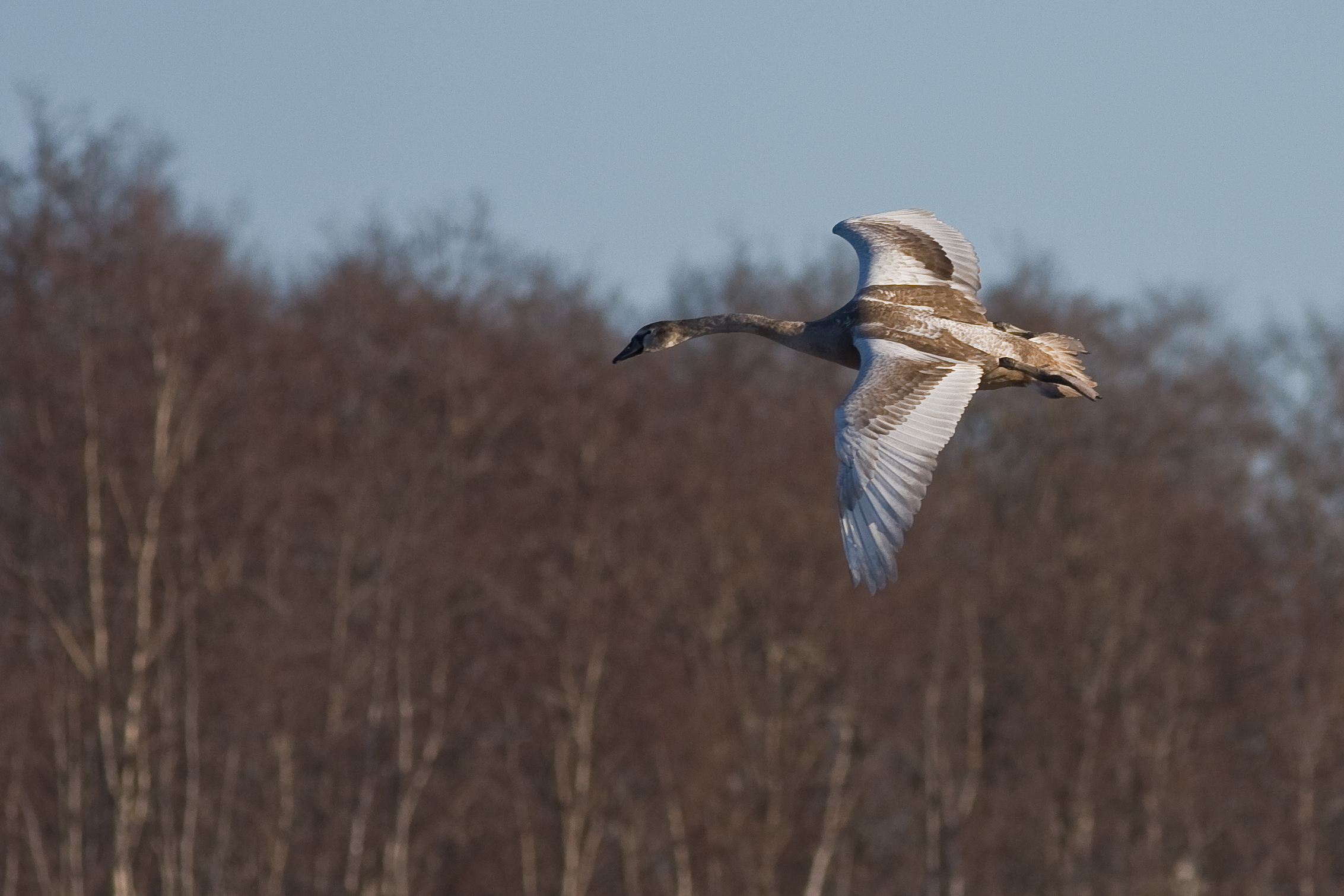
Juvenile mute swan

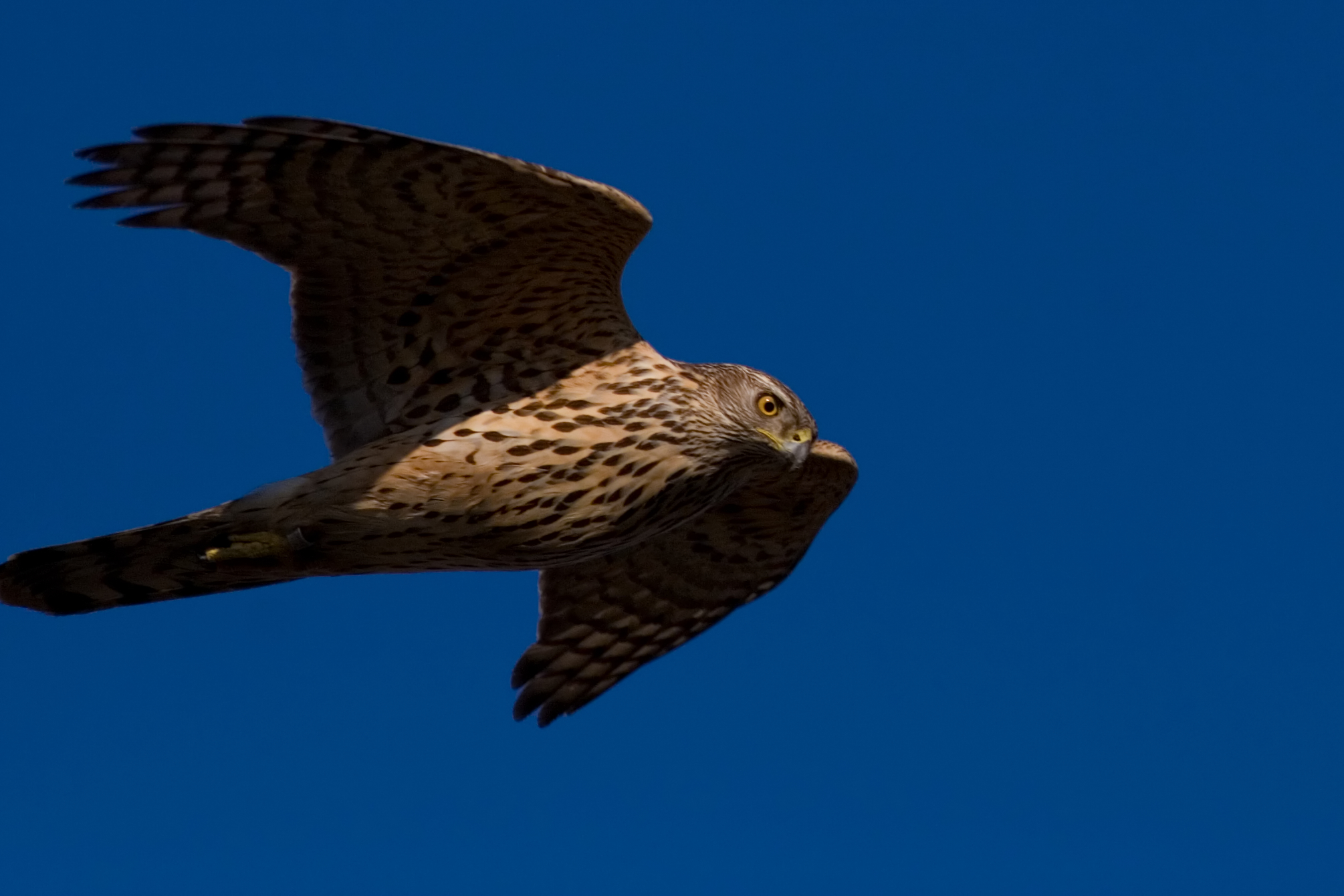
Goshawk

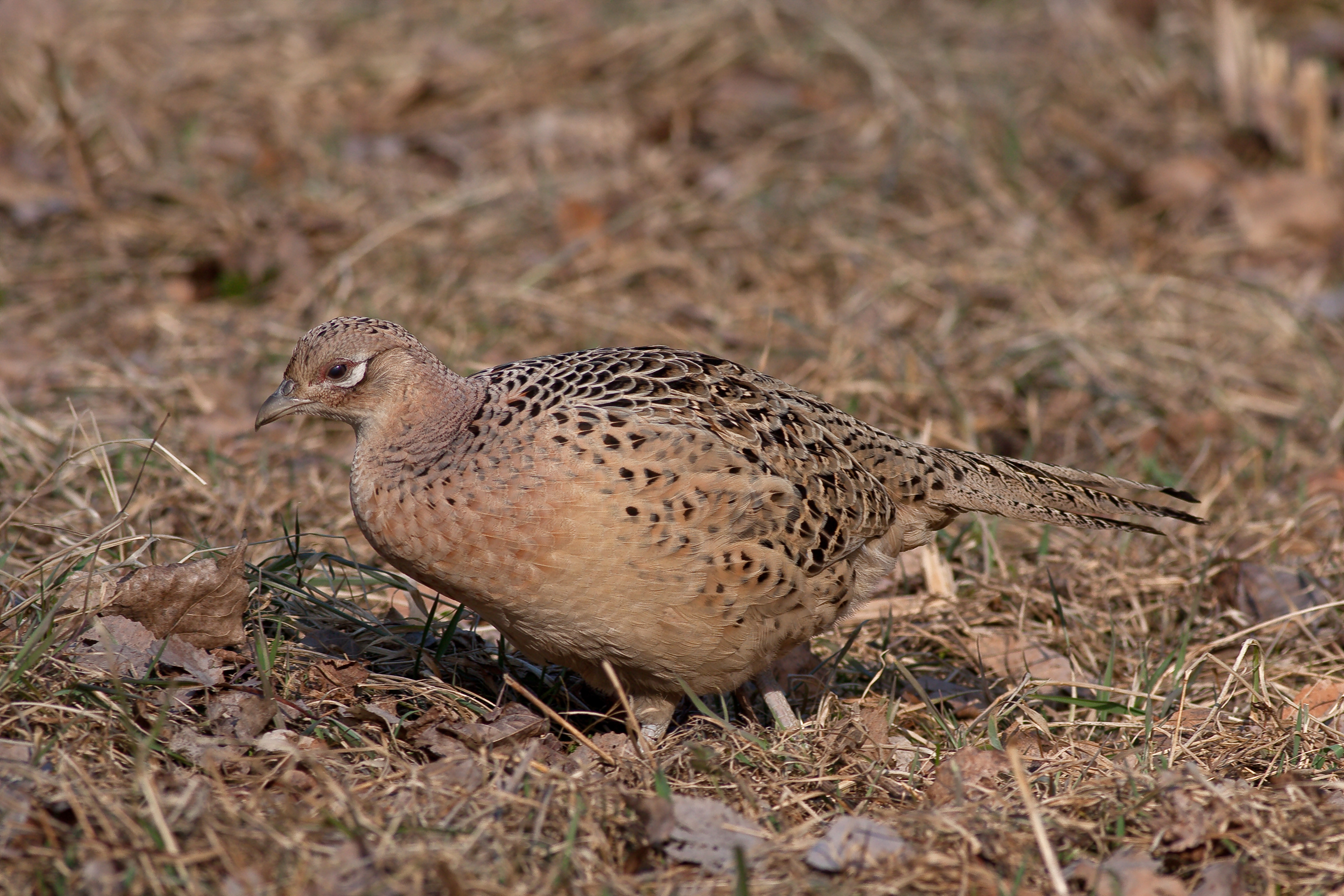
Female common pheasant
