= Maunula =

Maunula (in Finnish) Månsas (in Swedish)
- Neighborhood of Helsinki
- Nickname: It used to be nicknamed “Manela”
- Location in Helsinki
- Country: Finland
- Province: Southern Finland
- Region: Uusimaa
- Sub-region: Helsinki

Area
  - Total: 0.47 sq mi (1.23 km^{2})
  - Land: 0.47 sq mi (1.23 km^{2})

Population (2019)
  - Total: 7,618
  - Density: 16,041/sq mi (6,193.5/km^{2})
- Time zone: UTC+2 (EET)
  - Summer (DST): UTC+3 (EEST)

Maunula (Finnish), Månsas (Swedish) is a northwestern neighborhood of Helsinki, Finland. It hosted part of the road cycling events for the 1952 Summer Olympics.

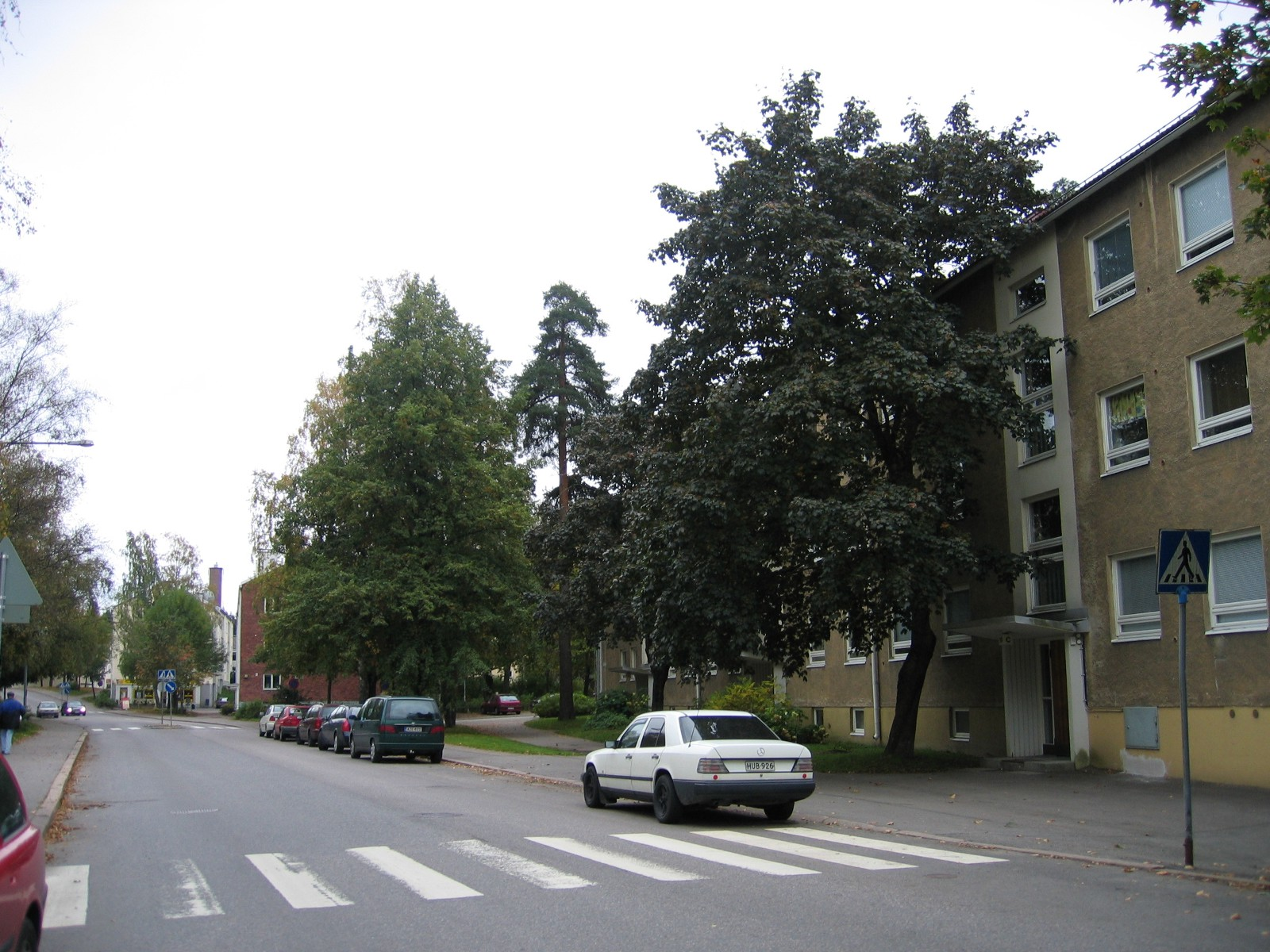
Apartment buildings in Maunula
