= Patola, Helsinki =

Coordinates: 60.232°N 24.960°E

Patola (in Finnish) Dammen (in Swedish)
- Neighborhood of Helsinki
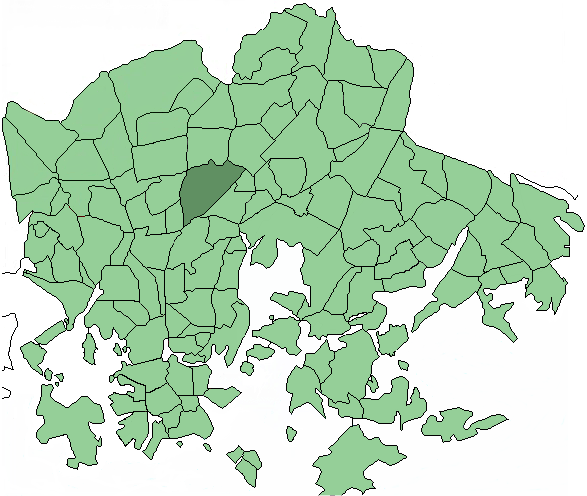
- Location in Helsinki
- Country: Finland
- Province: Southern Finland
- Region: Uusimaa
- Sub-region: Helsinki
- Time zone: UTC+2 (EET)
  - Summer (DST): UTC+3 (EEST)

Patola (Finnish), Dammen (Swedish) is a northern-central neighborhood of Helsinki, Finland.
