= Krepost Sveaborg =

Russian fortifications in World War I

- Part of Peter the Great's Naval Fortress
- Helsinki, Finland
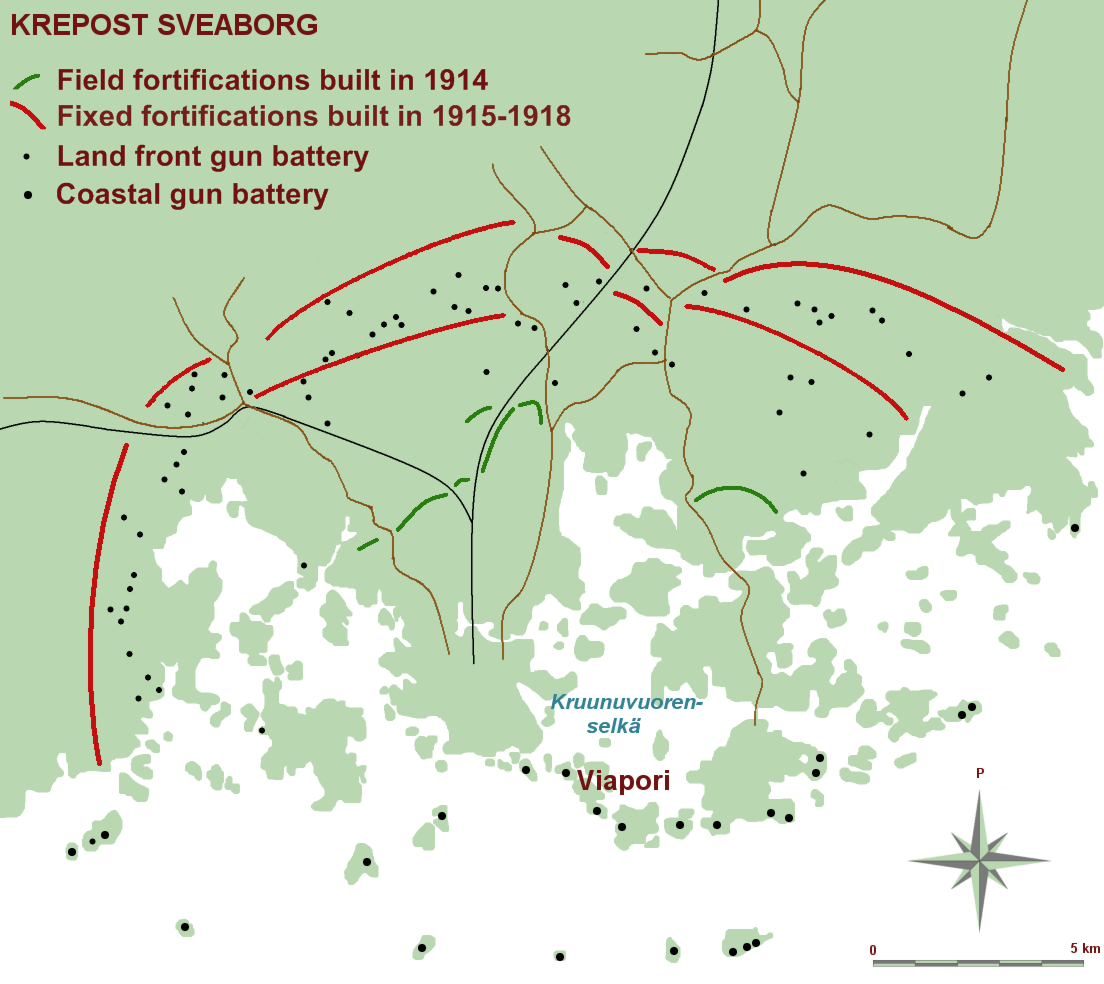
- Overall plan of Krepost Sveaborg

Site information
- Type: Fortress

Location
- Krepost Sveaborg shown within Finland
- Location within Finland
- Coordinates: 60.14°N 24.98°E

Site history
- Built: May 1914 — 1917
- Built by: Russian Empire

The Krepost Sveaborg was an Imperial Russian system of land and coastal fortifications constructed around Helsinki during the First World War. The purpose of the fortress was to provide a secure naval base for the Russian Baltic fleet and to protect Helsinki and block routes to Saint Petersburg from a possible German invasion. Krepost Sveaborg was part of Peter the Great's Naval Fortress, a coastal fortification system protecting access to Saint Petersburg by sea. The central part of Krepost Sveaborg was the old fortress of Sveaborg (known as Viapori in Finnish, and since 1918 as Suomenlinna) where the fortress headquarters were located. Due to technological advances in artillery the old fortress was no longer capable of providing a sufficient protection, and a new main defensive line was built well beyond the old fortress boundaries. New coastal artillery guns built on outlying islands protected Krepost Sveaborg from the sea, while fortified lines constructed around Helsinki were intended to stop any attacks on land. The primary coastal guns were 10 in (254 mm) model 1891 guns and 6 in (152 mm) model 1892 Canet guns. Older 11 in (279 mm) model 1877 guns were also used. In summer 1917 the fortress had two hundred coastal or anti-landing guns, of which 24 were 10-inch guns in six batteries, 16 were 6-inch Canet guns in four batteries and twelve were 11-inch guns in three batteries. The artillery used in land fortifications included older coastal guns, old fixed carriage guns and newer light field guns. In March 1917, Krepost Sveaborg had a total of 463 guns, although many of them were obsolescent. Krepost Sveaborg was still partly incomplete in 1917 when the February Revolution halted most of the construction work. Some further construction work was carried out during the remaining year, but all work halted during the October Revolution. Following the Finnish Declaration of Independence, parts of the land fortifications were used in the Finnish Civil War. The coastal fortifications were later taken over by Finland to protect Helsinki, while the land fortifications were mostly abandoned and disarmed.

== Background ==
Sweden had ceded Grand Duchy of Finland to Russian Empire as the result of the Finnish War of 1808—1809 and along with it the fortress of Sveaborg. The fortress protected the southern Finland and became a naval base for the Russian Baltic Fleet. After the end of the Napoleonic Wars many new buildings were built to improve the living conditions on the fortress, but the fortifications were neglected. After the start of the Crimean War in 1853 construction of new fortifications began on the other nearby islands and on the southern shore of Helsinki peninsula. In 1854 an Anglo-French naval fleet entered the Baltic Sea, hastening the work. These fortifications protected the flanks of the fortress and provided depth to the defence, but the problem of obsolescent artillery was not solved. Thus, when the fleet attacked the fortress on the 6th of August 1855 they were able to bombard the fortress for two days from a distance of 4–5 km (2.5–3.1 mi) while the best Russian guns had a maximum range of 2,500 m (8,200 ft).

After the Crimean War, the fortifications of Sveaborg Fortress were improved by building artillery casemates and new bomb-proof buildings. Vallisaari, just east of Sveaborg, was the site of the first new construction works. The harsh suppression of the Polish January Uprising of 1863 and the resulting criticism soured the relationships between Russia and western Europe and hastened the fortification works. Between 1863 and 1864 redoubts were built on Vallisaari, Kuninkaansaari and Santahamina islands. In 1860s and 1870s Russia purchased and then built under license new Prussian Krupp rifled breech loading guns which were also used in Sveaborg. A total of 32 new bomb-proof stone powder cellars were built by the beginning of the 1870s, further improving the defences. The Russo-Turkish War of 1877–1878 was the next crisis that threatened the peace between Russia and England, with new batteries being built at Sveaborg on Kuninkaansaari and older ones improved or rebuilt. New technology in the form of telegraph, railway lines and searchlights began to be used. Improvements in artillery and ammunition forced improving the gun positions by covering the old walls and fortifications with a thick earthen walls. With high-explosive shells appearing at the end of the 19th century earth and stone were no longer sufficient and first concrete fortifications with steel doors were built in Sveaborg. Continually improving guns resulted increased range, necessitating rangefinders, while heavier guns and ammunition required improving piers, roads, cranes and ammunition carts to transport the guns or move ammunition from magazines to guns. Despite the improvements the funds and resources allocated to the fortress were not sufficient to keep pace with the evolution of military technology. While parts of the fortress or were improved and new weapons or equipment were received, the overall condition of the fortress became ever more obsolescent, and the vulnerability of the flanks and rear were a lasting problem. By the end of 1880s and early 1890s Sveaborg could no longer be considered a proper fortress but only a coastal position, capable of defending only against an enemy coming directly from the sea. The primary role of the fortress became more one of internal politics, as it helped the Russians maintain control of Helsinki.

== Krepost Sveaborg ==
In the 1890s the priority of the fortification works in the Baltic Sea had been the protection of the ice-free port of Liepāja, and the Kronstadt fortress protecting Saint Petersburg, relegating Sveaborg to a secondary status. After the losses during the Russo-Japanese War and in light of the rising might of the Imperial German Navy, Liepāja was considered too vulnerable for a main fleet base, and the decision to build Peter the Great's Naval Fortress was made. In the new plans the main line of defence against the enemy was at the Porkkala-Tallinn line with Tallinn also the new main base for the Russian Baltic Fleet. Helsinki was to be a base for torpedo boat flotillas. The construction of the Tallinn naval base was delayed however, and with the new ships being constructed to replace the losses suffered against Japan the Russian Navy was forced to rely more on Helsinki despite the obsolete armament and inadequate fortifications at Sveaborg. As the threat of war in Europe grew, it became essential to expand the fortress to provide a necessary protection for the naval base. Until 1910, when the first 152 mm Canet guns arrived, the only modern weapons at Sveaborg were 57 mm quick fire guns with the rest of the artillery designs dating from the Russo-Turkish War. The first new 254 mm guns arrived in 1913, but it was not until early 1914 that construction of the first new batteries began on Melkki and Isosaari. During the First World War the new Krepost Sveaborg was built to substantially expand the old fortress. A new main line of defence was constructed on the outlying islands, pushing the defensive line several kilometers southward, thus providing a secure outer anchorage south of the old fortress for larger warships without the need to navigate the narrow straits leading to the inner anchorage at Kruunuvuorenselkä. The older parts of the fortress became a second line of defence and the main storage areas. The rear of the fortress was finally protected by land fortifications, at first field fortifications on the Helsinki peninsula built in 1914, and, later, an outer line of fixed fortifications.

== Troops and organization ==
At the start of the First World War Krepost Sveaborg was subordinated to the Russian 6th Army. In summer 1916 Krepost Sveaborg was subordinated to Baltic Fleet. At the start of the war Krepost Sveaborg was divided into three defensive areas, with the sea front forming one defensive area and the land front divided to Pasila and Laajasalo-Herttoniemi areas. The sea front was further divided into six sectors, with sectors 1–4 at the old fortress, sector 5 at Melkki and sector 6 at Isosaari. The sea front was divided into main line of defence from Melkki to Isosaari and second line of defence from Lauttasaari to Santahamina at the end of 1914. As the new batteries were constructed Melkki was relegated to second line of defence and Lauttasaari to land front in spring 1915. At the land front new defensive lines were constructed from 1915 onward further away from the city center. The new land front was divided into three sectors: eastern, northern and western. Krepost Sveaborg was also responsible for a larger fortification district that included coast line west of the fortress until Hanko.

At the start of the war the fortification artillery units manning the fortress were organized into nine artillery companies and a machine gun detachment. In April 1915 the fortification artillery units were reorganized into a single fortification artillery regiment with three battalions and a machine gun company. Four companies manned the coastal forts at sea front. In June 1916 the regiment was divided in two, with 1st regiment responsible for the seaward defence and the 2nd for the landward defence. Both regiments had ten companies in three battalions. The 1st regiment was divided into three defence detachments, with south-western and south-eastern detachments responsible for the main line of defence on the outlying islands with the newest guns, while the third detachment manned the second line on the old fortress. The artillery regiments had a common supply unit responsible for the weapons, ammunition, transportation between islands etc. A signals company built and maintained the communication lines. The minefields around the fortress were built by the Krepost Sveaborg mine company, from 1915 a mine battalion. In 1916 the fortress was reinforced by the mine battalion from Vladivostok fortress. Construction and engineering department of the fortress headquarters organized the construction works of the fortress with engineering and sapper units as well as the civilian workers.

Infantry units at the fortress manned the landward defences and provided detachments on the coastal forts for anti-landing and close defence duties. The peacetime Krepost Sveaborg fortress infantry regiment was reinforced by conscript units, which in 1915 were organized as the 427th and 428th infantry regiments to a new 107th infantry division which was sent to front line after a training period. In spring 1916 regiments from the new 116th division manned the fortress. At the autumn of 1916 units from different fortresses were brought to Krepost Sveaborg and organized into the 128th infantry division. In July 1917 the fortress was manned by the fortress infantry regiment and the 428th Lodeynoye Pole infantry regiment of the 128th division. In October 1917 the 128th was replaced by the 29th infantry division, badly mauled at the front and brought to Krepost Sveaborg for rest. At January–February 1918, when Finland gained its independence, Krepost Sveaborg had six infantry regiments: the 696th revolutionary regiment, the fortress infantry regiment and 113th, 114th, 115th and 116th regiments of the 29th infantry division.

Construction workers included Russian soldiers but also Finnish civilian workers and forced labour using prisoners transported from far east. Finns were exempt from conscription, and thus there was available manpower for fortification works. The payment for fortification works was slightly above average for manual labour, and made it an attractive option particularly for many rural workers. In 1915 when large scale construction of fortifications around Finland began Russians instituted a work responsibility for Finns based on wartime emergency law to obtain the necessary labour force. To ease the manpower shortage Russians brought convicted prisoners from far east to Finland in summer 1916 as forced labour. Approximately 2000-3000 men, including Chinese, Kyrgyz and Tatars, were employed as lumberjacks around Espoo and Sipoo. Kyrgyz were mainly guards. Asian workers were transported back to Russia already in 1917 however, citing the workers to be unaccustomed to the northern climate and possible threat of rebellion. The total number of workers is unknown, but an estimated 10,000 to 15,000 men were used in construction works around Helsinki and up to 100,000 total in Finland. Complicated bureaucracy delayed the construction works, and the supervision of the works was also poor, leading to widespread graft.

== Armament ==
=== Coastal guns ===
The most powerful coastal guns used at Krepost Sveaborg were the 10 in (254 mm) 45 caliber model 1891 guns. They had a maximum range of 21 km (13 mi) but suffered from primitive mountings: the heavy guns, weighing 51 metric tons (56 short tons), were completely hand-operated resulting in slow traverse and elevation rates and exhausting the gun crews. The rate of fire was only one shot every two minutes and they were also not capable of penetrating the armour of newer warships: at the range of 10 km (6.2 mi) they could penetrate 127 mm (5 in) of armour at 90° angle. First four guns were transported to the fortress in 1913 from Kronstadt fortress, two guns each from Constantin and Obrutshev forts. Twelve guns were transported from Vladivostok in 1914 and eight more arrived in 1915, with a total of 24 guns in six four-gun batteries. These guns formed the primary armament of the sea front main line of defence. The batteries were located on Rysäkari, Katajaluoto, Kuivasaari, Isosaari (two batteries) and Itä-Villinki.

The 6 in (152 mm) 45 caliber model 1892 guns supplemented the 10 inch guns of the sea front main line of defence. These guns were French Canet guns and had a maximum range of 13–14 km (8.1–8.7 mi). Unlike the 10 inch guns, the 6 inch guns had a modern counter-recoil system and achieved a rate of fire of five shots per minute. The six inch guns were intended against destroyers and other smaller vessels. They were installed in four batteries of four guns each at the sea front on Miessaari, Harmaja, Isosaari and Santahamina. A fifth battery was under construction on the mainland at Skatanniemi cape. The guns for this battery arrived, bringing the total sea front number to twenty, but the construction was not completed before the war ended. Further seventeen guns on lower ship deck mountings with lower maximum elevation were used on the land front. The guns used at Krepost Sveaborg included both Russian Obukhov licence-produced guns and French Schneider guns.

The older heavy coastal artillery pieces, the 9 in (229 mm) and 11 in (279 mm) model 1867 and 1877 guns and the 9 in (229 mm) and 11 in (279 mm) model 1877 coastal mortars, were mostly transferred to land front or placed in reserve. Three batteries (twelve guns) of 11 inch model 1877 guns were used throughout the war at the sea front second line of defence at Kustaanmiekka, Kuninkaansaari and Vallisaari. At the start of the war 11 inch guns were also used at the main line of defence on Isosaari before 10 inch model 1891 guns replaced them. Two batteries of 11 inch coastal mortars remained in use until 1916 in Vallisaari and Kuninkaansaari. The mortars were also capable of firing to the rear of the fortress and were intended to keep the citizens of Helsinki loyal. The heavy shells of the mortars were considered to have a "suitable moral effect" (Finnish: asianmukainen moraalinen vaikutus) on civilians. 6 in (152 mm) 22 caliber siege gun model 1877 was primarily an army weapon used on wheeled carriage on land front, but some guns mounted on fortification mounts were also used on sea front at the start of the war.

Light coastal guns used at Krepost Sveaborg included 57 mm Nordenfelt guns, fifteen guns at the beginning of the war and twenty by the end of the war. 75 mm (3 in) 50 caliber model 1892 Canet guns were similar to the six inch model 1892 gun. First of these guns arrived at 1914, and twelve coastal guns were used at Krepost Sveaborg, with another eighth anti-aircraft gun versions with a 50° maximum elevation.

It was planned in 1916 to build four two-gun batteries of 12 in (305 mm) 52 caliber model 1907 guns at Krepost Sveaborg, but the work started in 1917 never progressed beyond building gun mount foundations and some ammunition and crew shelters. The batteries were to be built on the mainland, with guns in single open positions capable of firing on both land and sea targets. The batteries were located at Munkkiniemi, Haaga, Oulunkylä and Koskela. The 305 mm guns were used later to protect Helsinki however, as Finland built an armoured twin turret on Kuivasaari between 1931 and 1935 and two guns in open positions at Isosaari during the Second World War in 1941–1944.

Coastal guns of Krepost Sveaborg
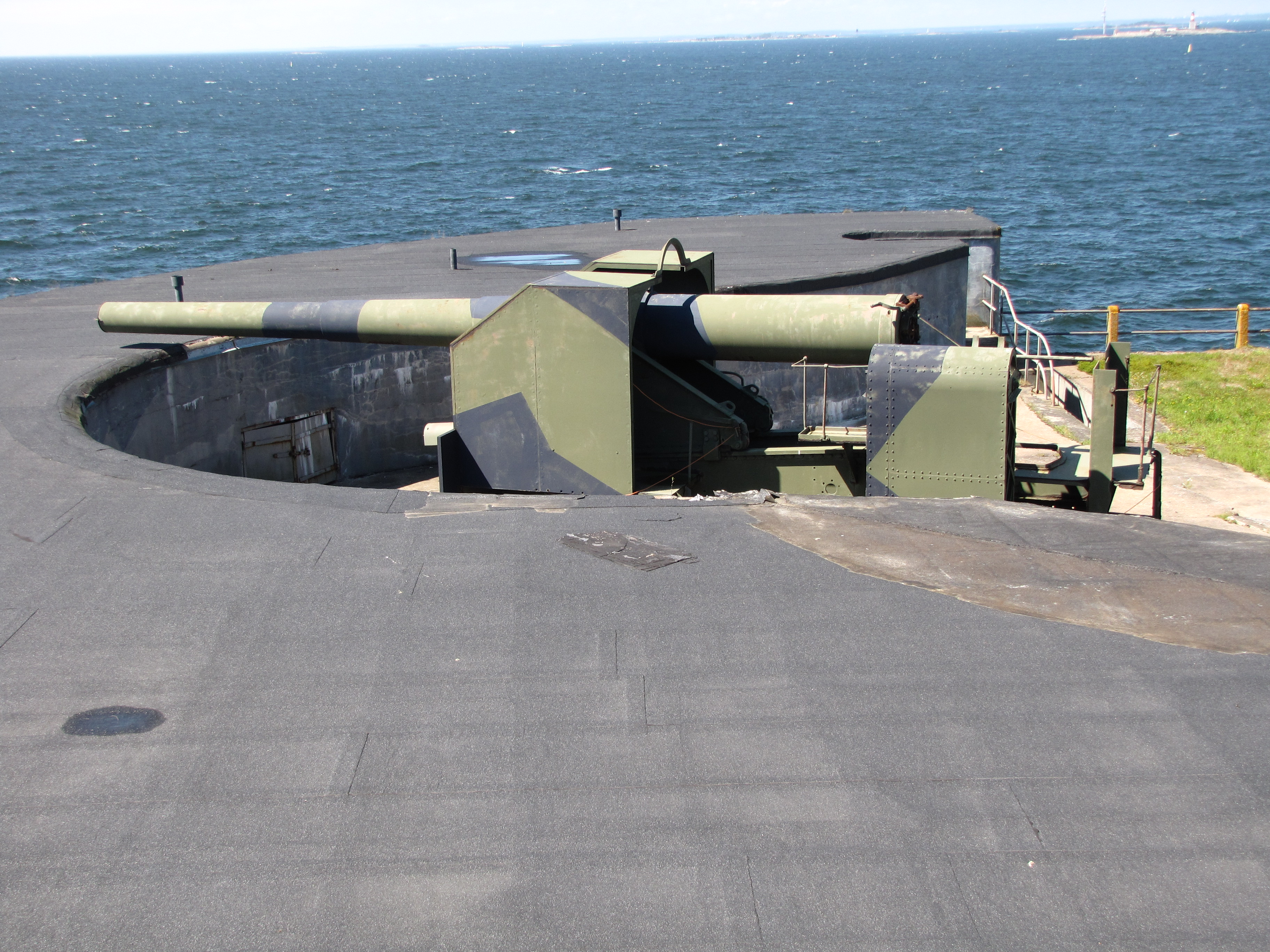
10 in (254 mm) 45 caliber model 1891 gun

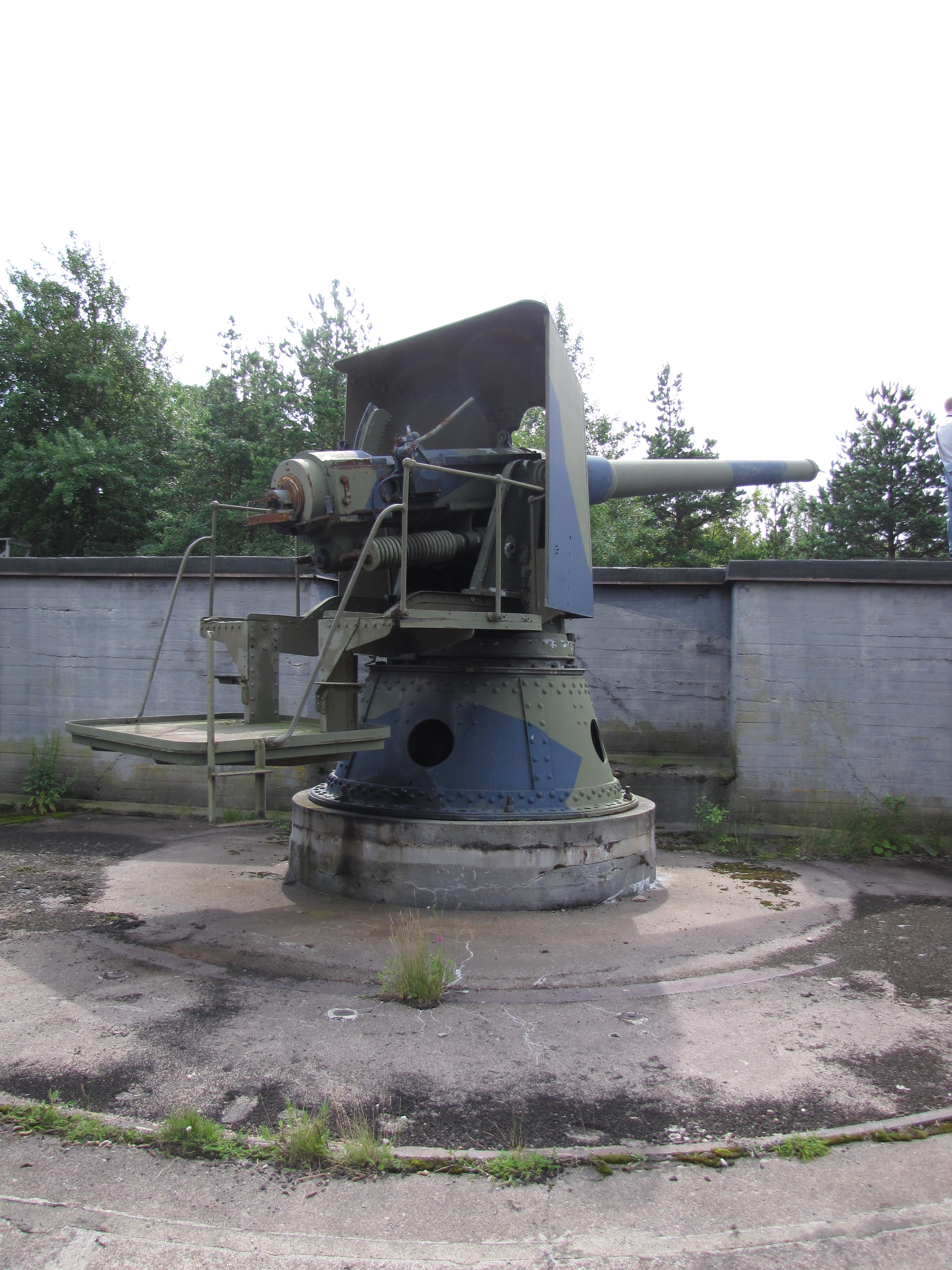
6 in (152 mm) 45 caliber model 1892 Canet gun

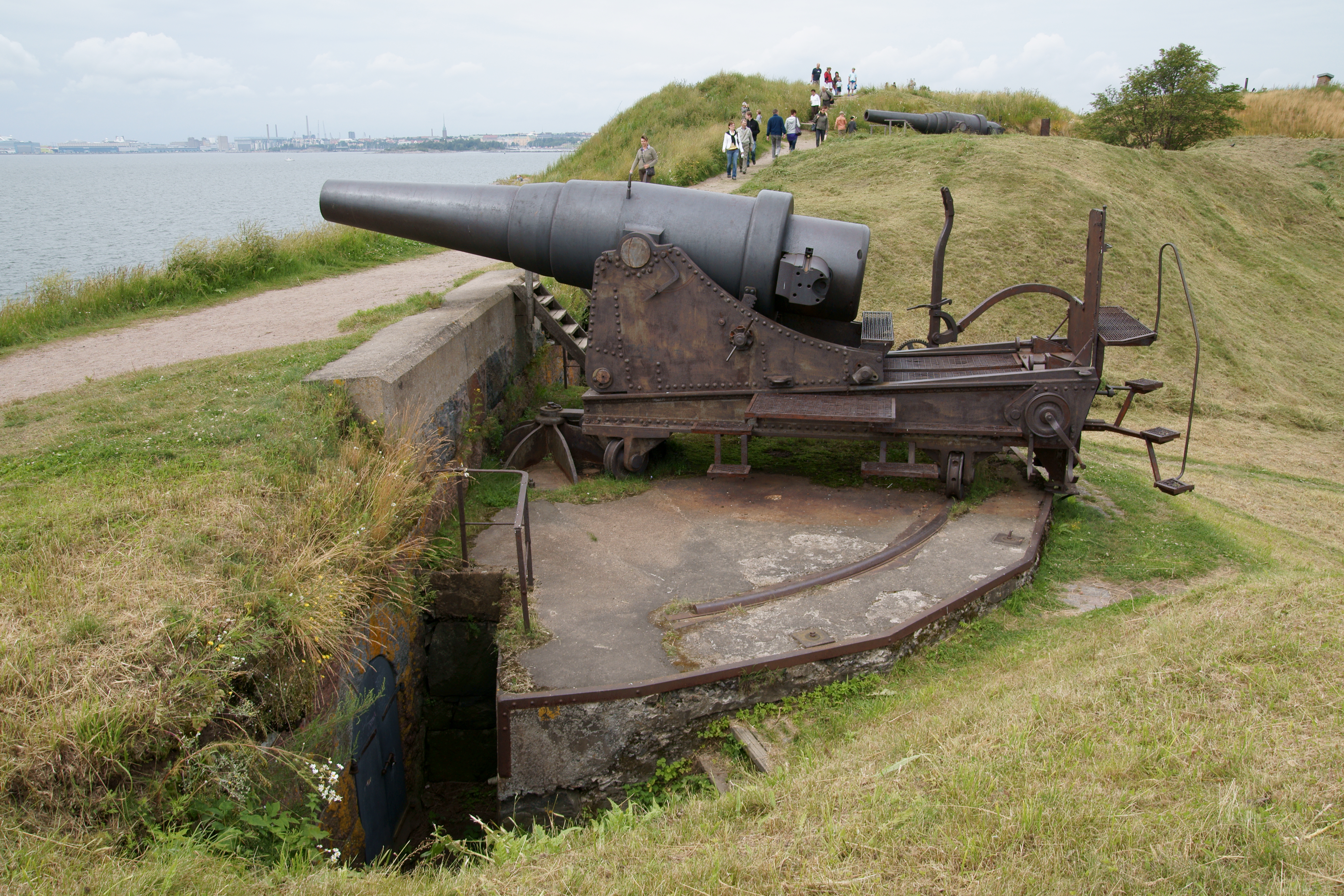
11 in (279 mm) model 1877 gun

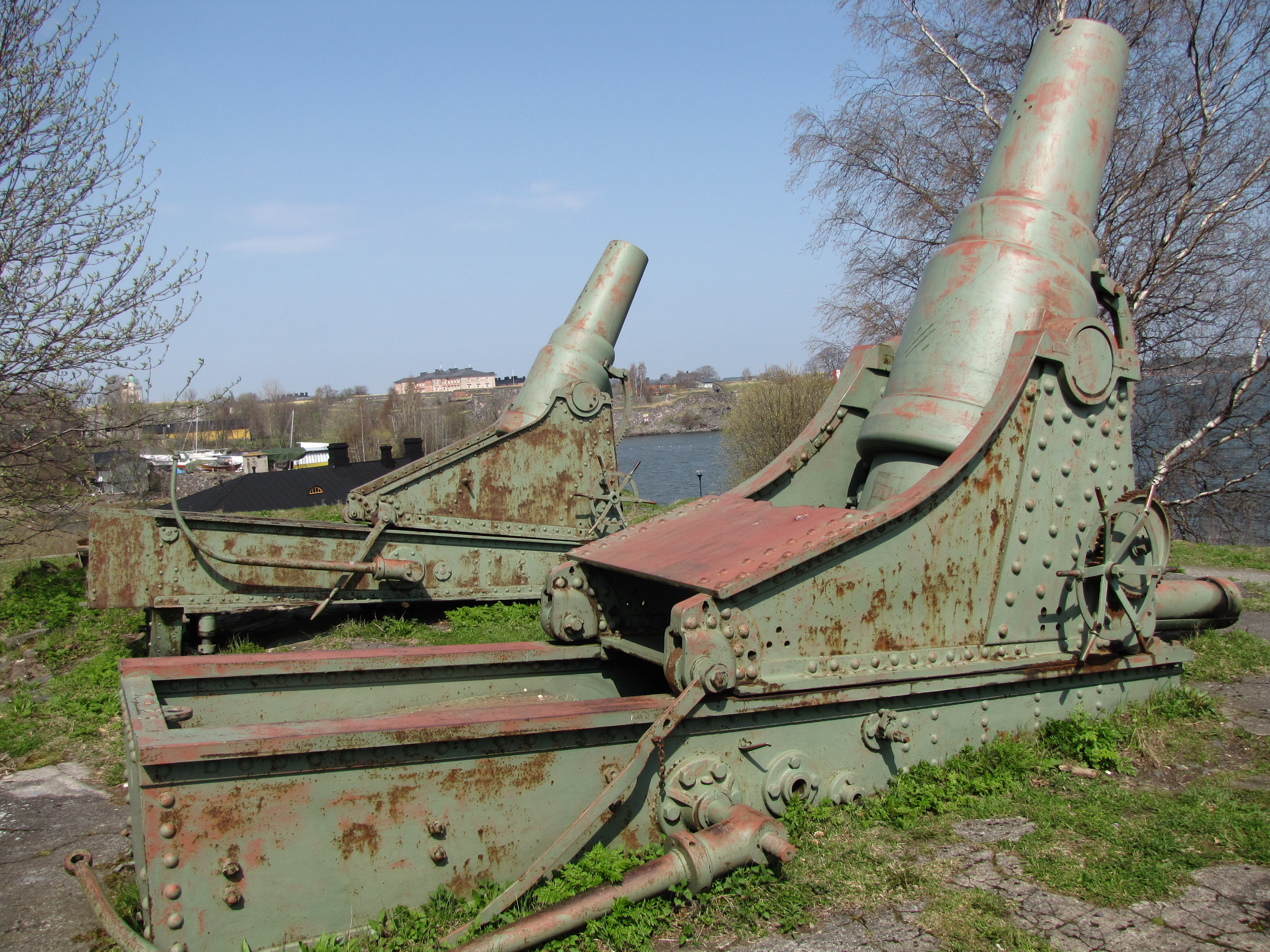
11 inch and 9 inch model 1877 coastal mortars

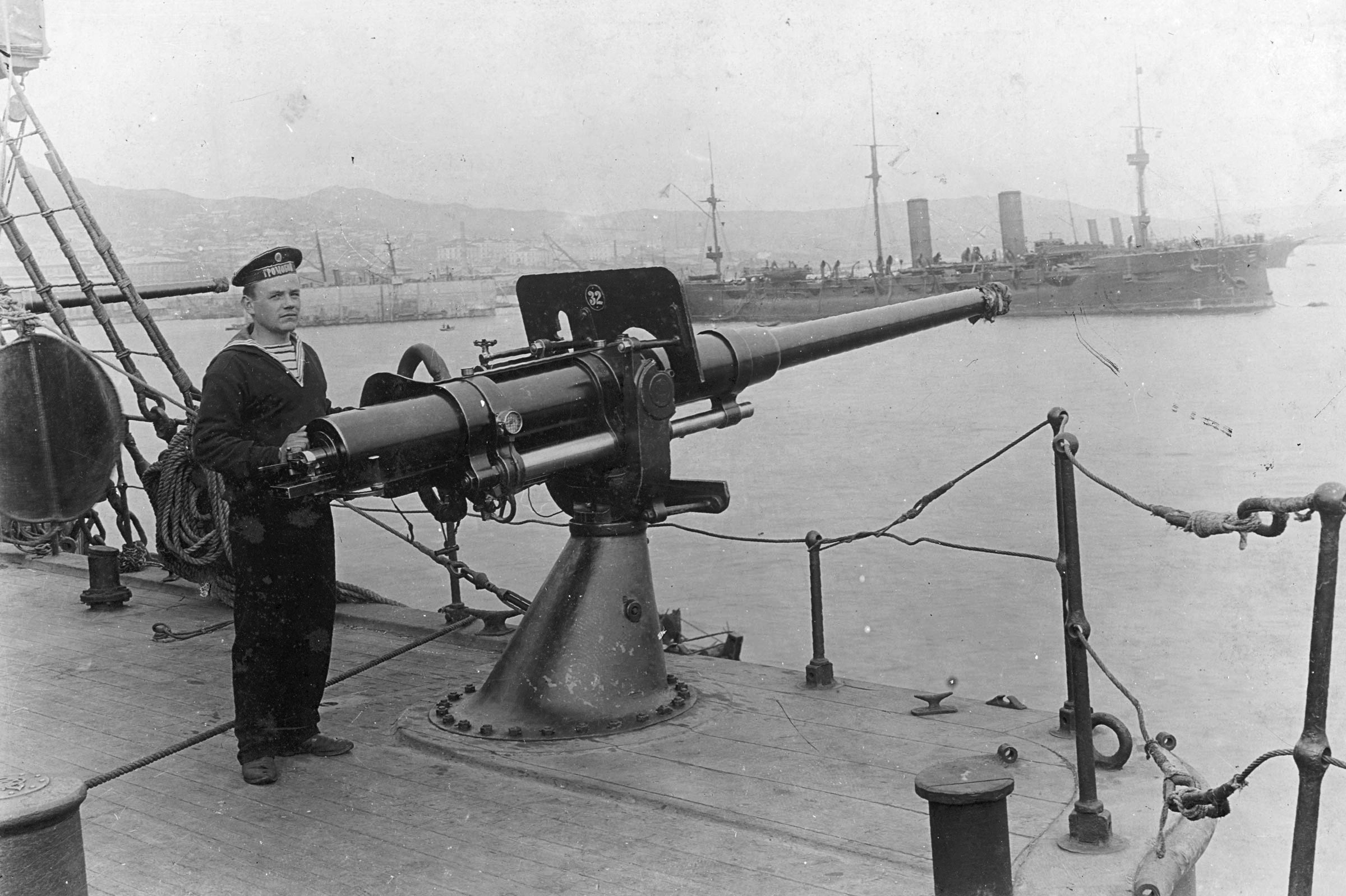
75 mm (3 in) 50 caliber model 1892 Canet gun

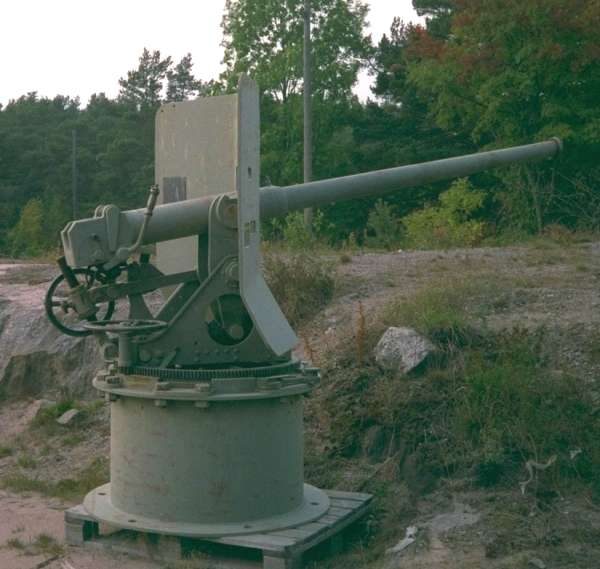
57 mm Nordenfelt gun

Changes in coastal guns at Krepost Sveaborg
Gun	July 1914	December 1914	May 1915	August 1917
10 inch 45 caliber model 1891	0	16	16	24
11 inch model 1877	10	19	20	12
6 inch 45 caliber model 1892 Canet	12	12	12	16+4
6 in (152 mm) 22 caliber siege gun model 1877	29	2	0	0
75 mm 50 caliber model 1892 Canet	0	14	20	12
57 mm 48 caliber Nordenfelt	2	15	15	20
11 inch model 1877 mortar	9	8	4	0

=== Field guns ===
Field guns were used on both the land front and as anti-landing and close defence weapons on the coastal forts. Gun models included both older fixed carriage guns and more modern weapons with counter-recoil systems. The most common models were the 6 inch siege gun model 1877 with a 190 pood version used on both field and fortress mounts and a lighter 120 pood barrel version on field carriage. 42 line (107 mm or 4.2 in) battery gun model 1877 and 34 line (87 mm or 3.4 in) light field gun model 1877 were other older field artillery pieces used at the fortress. 76 mm model 1902 gun was a newer rapid fire field gun with a counter recoil system. The 76 mm model 1902 gun was also used as an anti-aircraft gun on a modified "Rosenberg" mount. The land front weaponry also included a variety of smaller caliber anti-storming guns, caponier guns and other mixed artillery pieces. The reserve guns included different older models up to bronze-barrelled mortars.

Field guns of Krepost Sveaborg
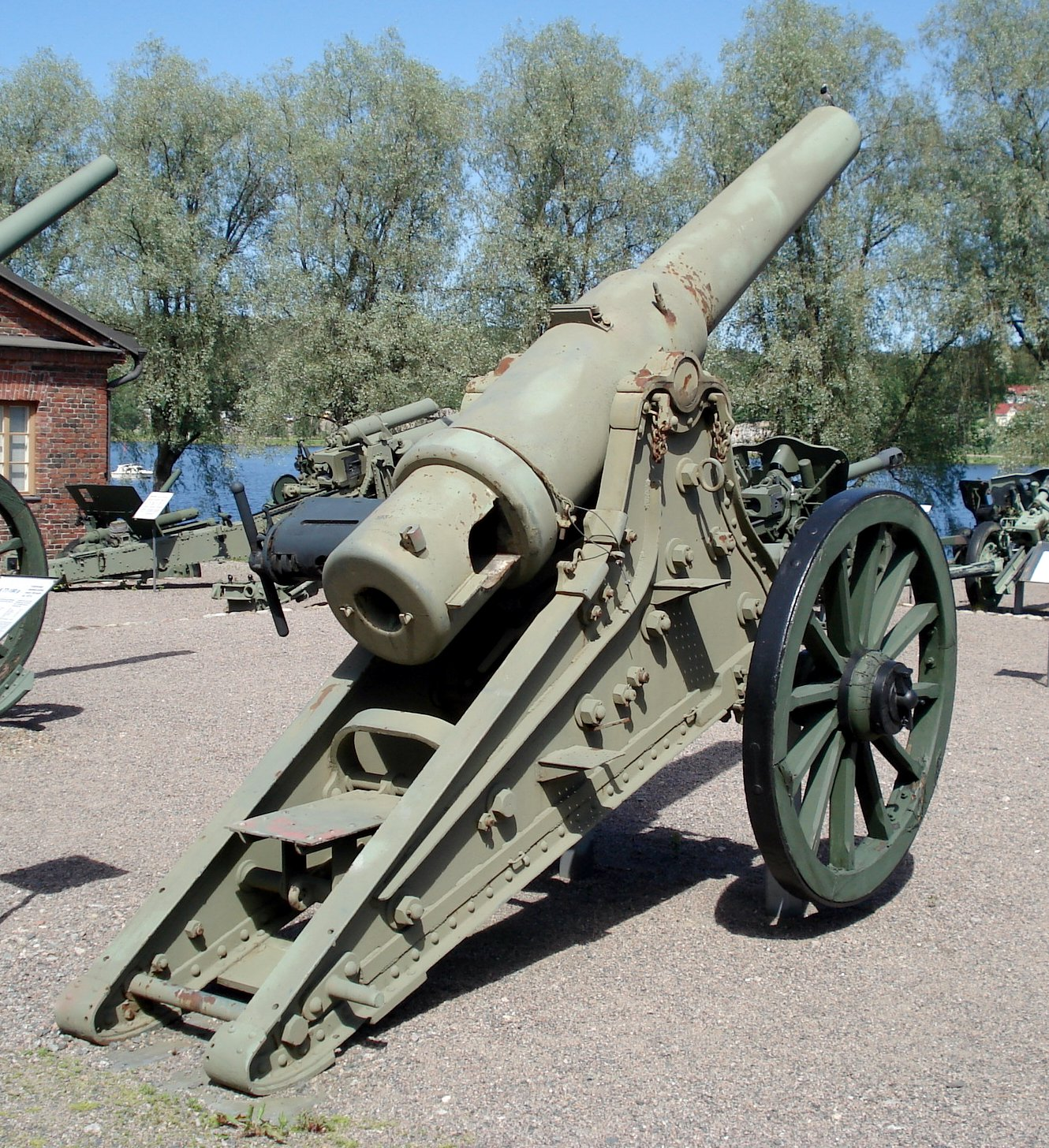
6 inch 190 pood barrel model 1877 siege gun

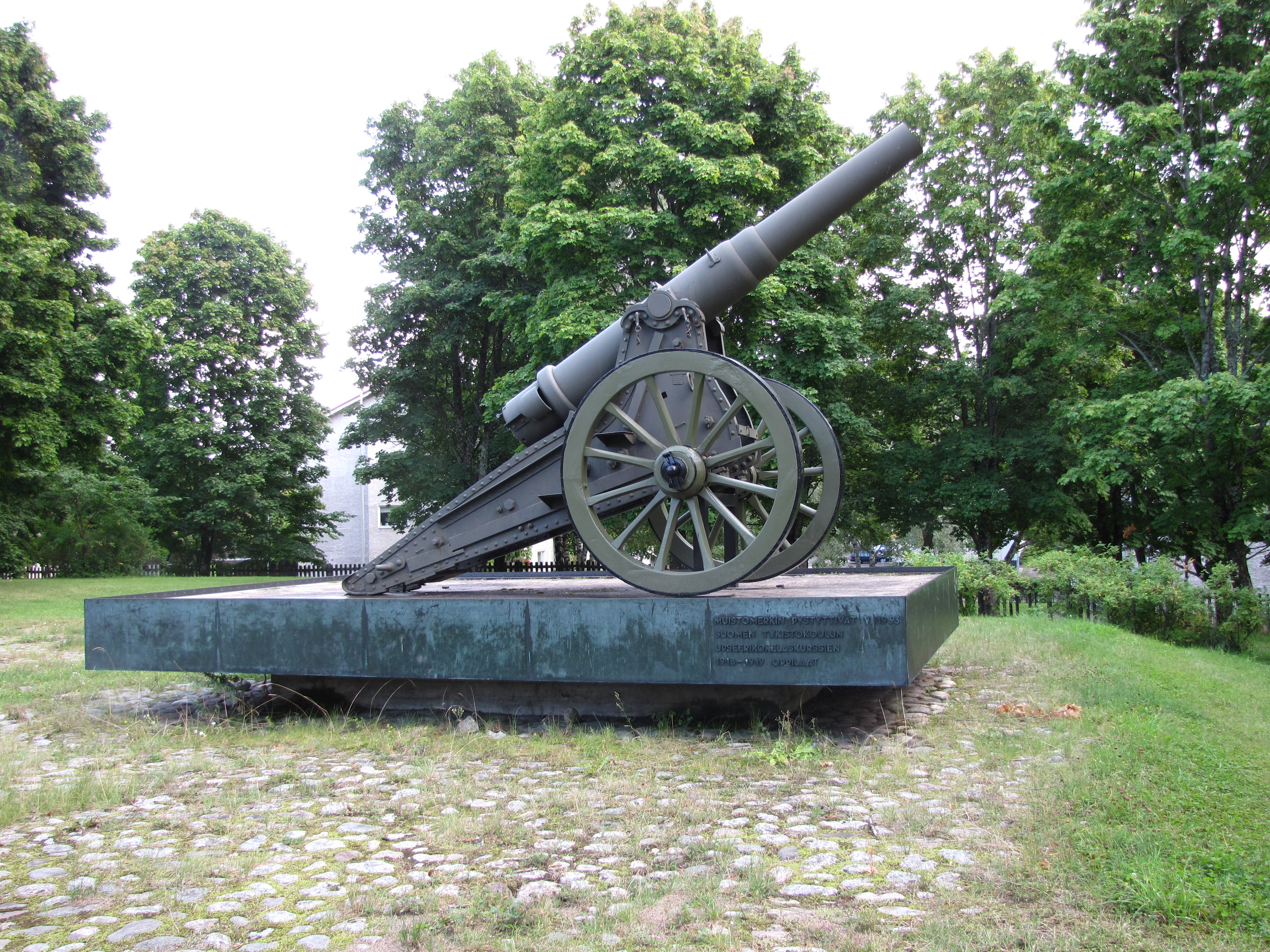
6 inch 120 pood barrel model 1877 siege gun

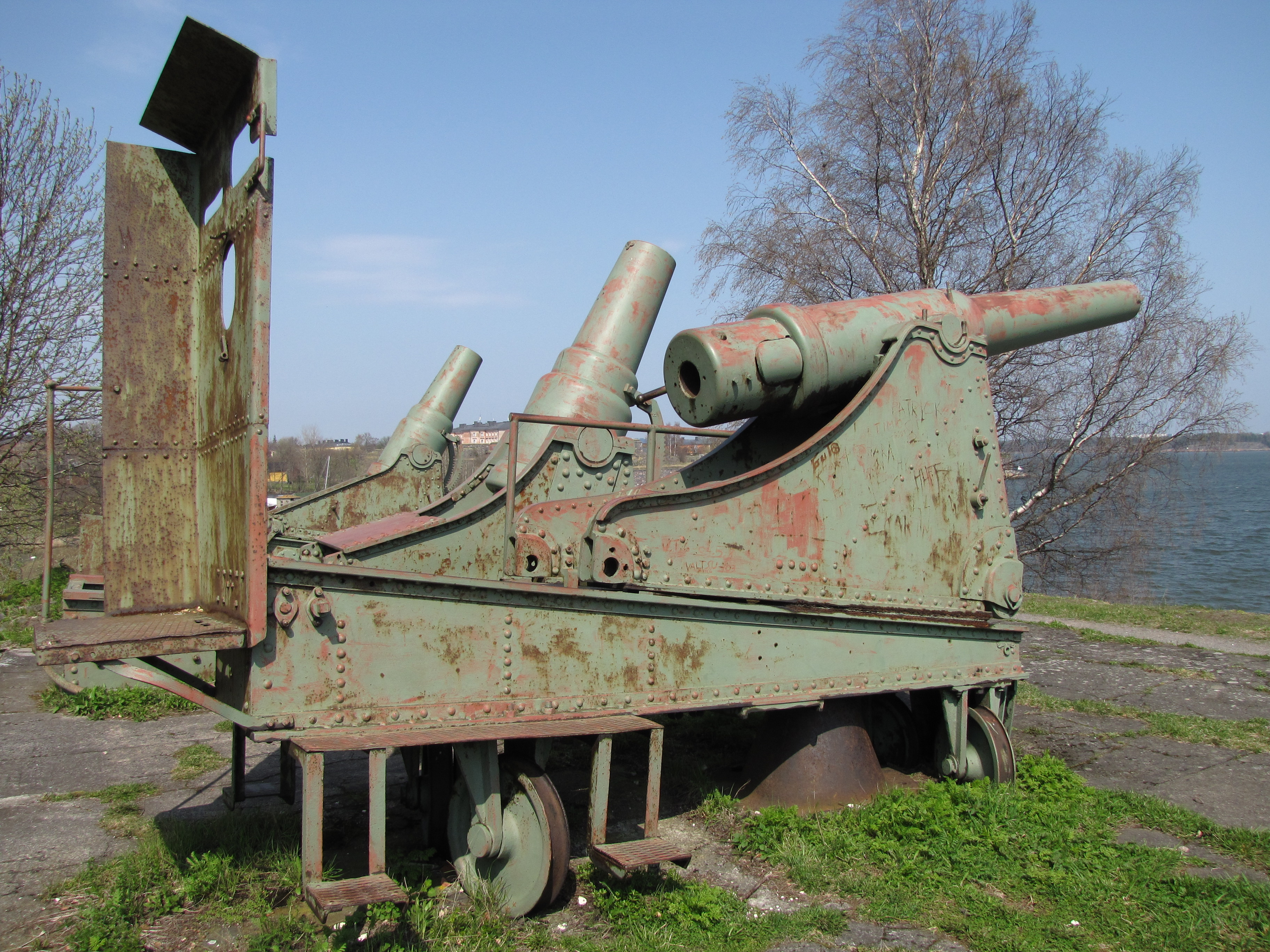
6 inch model 1877 siege gun on fortress carriage

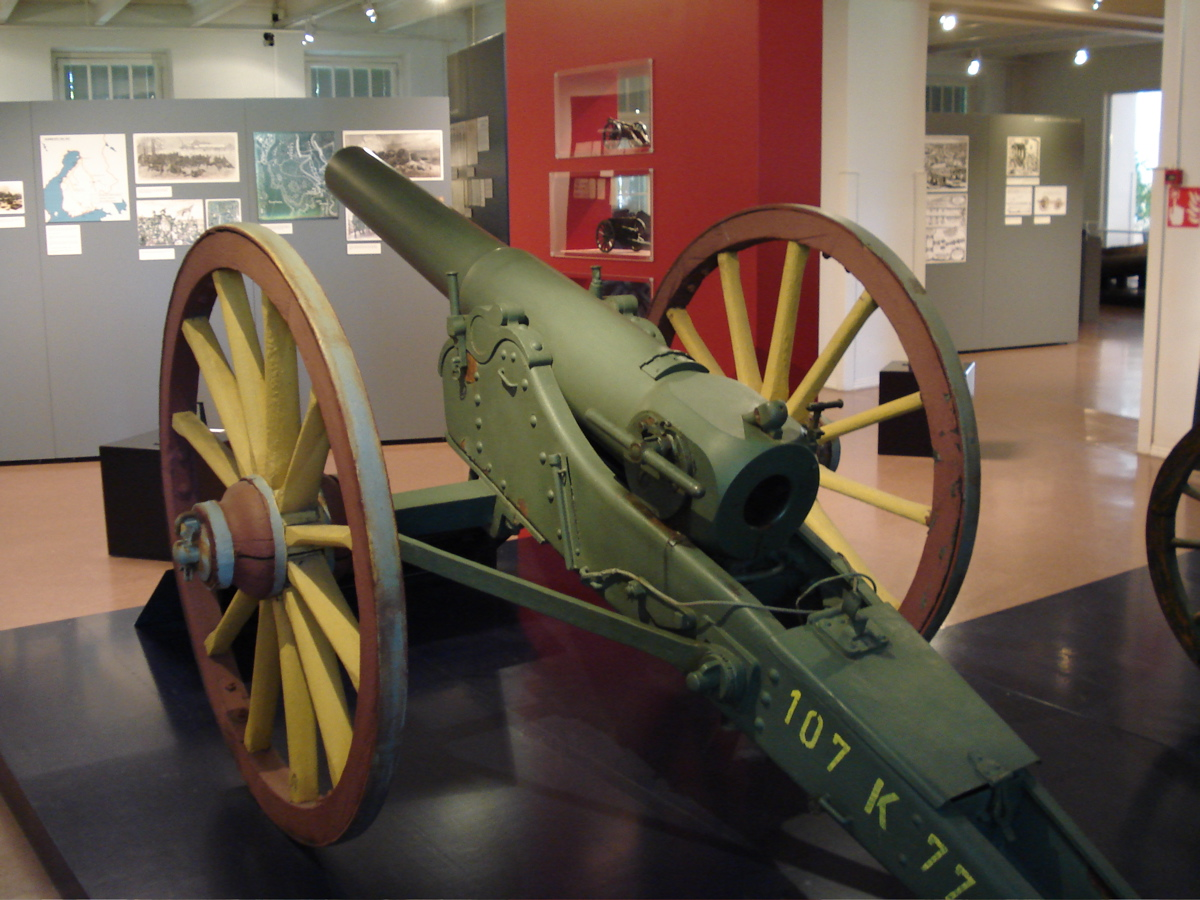
42 line model 1877 battery gun

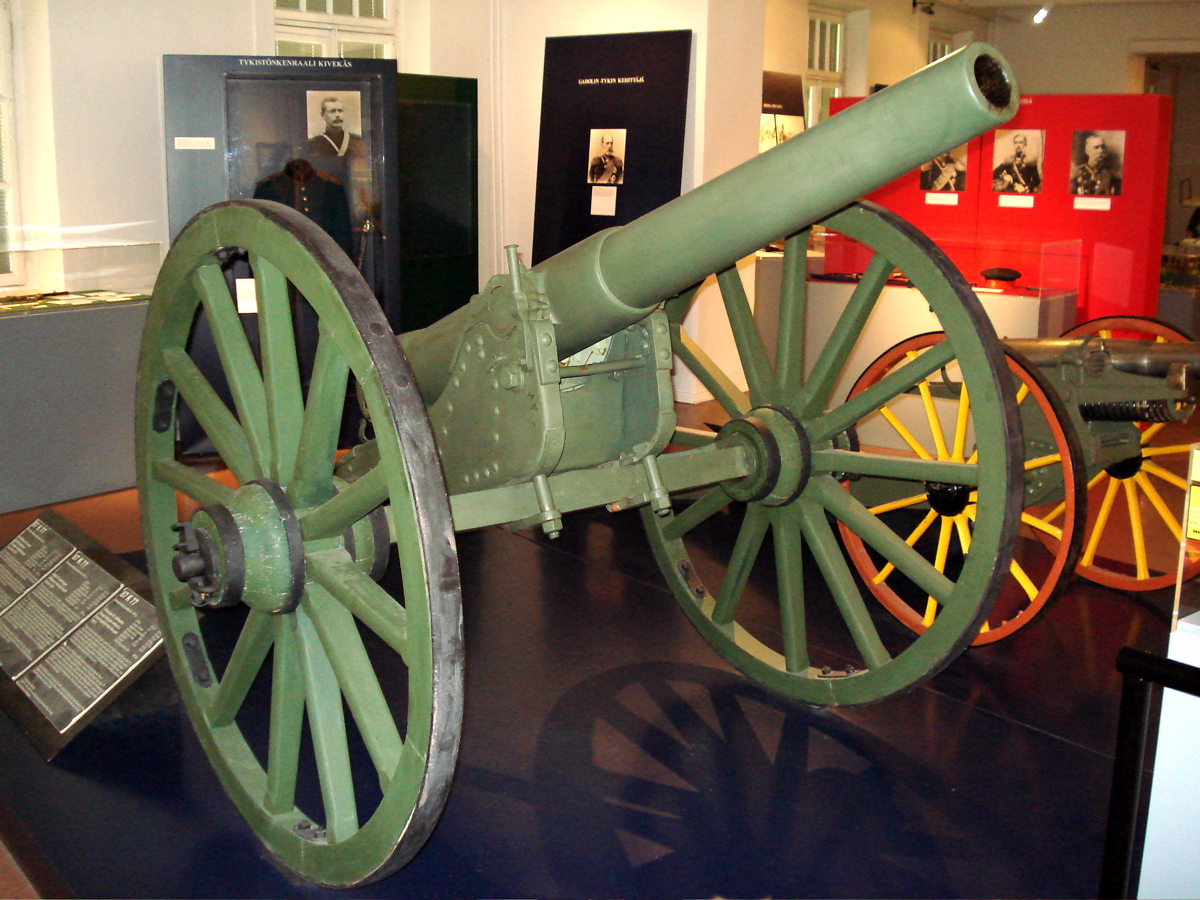
34 line model 1877 field gun

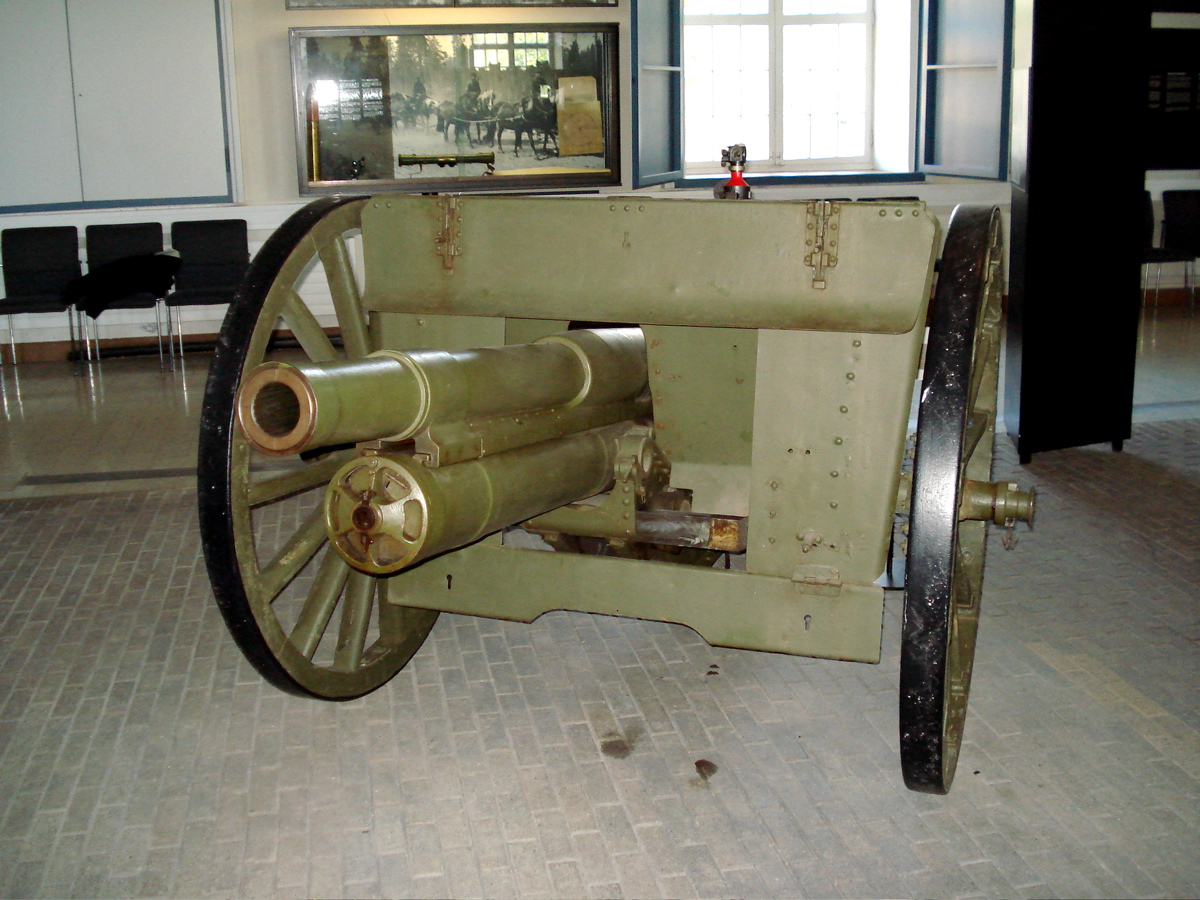
76 mm model 1902 field gun

=== Mines ===
Naval mines were also used to protect Krepost Sveaborg from an attack from the sea. An outer line of contact mines was laid approximately 15 km (9 mi) outside the main line of defence. Shore detonated controlled mines were used to create an inner mine barrier to protect the entrances to the outer anchorage. These mines were laid typically in three rows with 200 m (656 ft) separation between rows and 60 m (197 ft) between mines in a row. Controlled mines required an extensive cabling system to the shore stations where the command to detonate the mines was given. Fortified electrical stations provided the necessary electricity for the mine control network. Electricity was also used for communication systems, searchlights, electrical ammunition lifts and in barracks and crew shelters.

== Equipment ==
=== Rangefinders ===
Vertical based rangefinders, where the known base length is the height of the rangefinder from sea level, were first used at Sveaborg in the 1880s. Vertical based rangefinders required only one instrument, but they were susceptible to interference from vibration caused by firing of the guns. Vertical based rangefinders also required a substantially high measurement site that was a problem on the low islands. To measure distance with reasonable accuracy to a target 10 km (6 mi) away the rangefinder had to be at least 10 fathoms (21.3 m or 70 ft) and preferably 20 fathoms (42.6 m or 140 ft) high - often impossible to achieve. Measurement sites had usually the rangefinder on a stone or masonry column 110 cm (43 in) high lying on a granite foundation. The measurement pavilions had simple wooden walls and sheet metal roof protecting them from the elements and were 4–6 m^{2} (43–65 sq ft) in size. Vertical rangefinders were no longer used on the new forts built on the outer islands.

Distance measurement at the 10 in (254 mm) model 1891 batteries was based on horizontal triangulation from two different points, a primary and secondary, on separate islands. The rangefinders used were general von der Launitz's models 1903 and 1905–07. The average distance between the two points at Krepost Sveaborg was 5.5 km (3 mi). Target information was sent from the primary point to the battery command point. If the primary point was located away from the battery or directing a different battery a rangefinder converter designed by colonel Kovanko was used to calculate the firing solution. A weakness in using two measurement points was that any malfunctions in either of the rangefinders or in the telephone system would render the system inoperable. Target indication between the primary and secondary points could also pose problems, as there would often be several similar target ships. The system was also not capable of measuring distances to targets in the rear of the battery; a maximum measurement sector was 140°.

On the smaller 6 in (152 mm) model 1892 Canet gun and anti-aircraft batteries 3 m (10 ft) wide Zeiss stereoscopic rangefinders were used. Maximum distance that could be reliably measured with three meter rangefinders was 8–10 km (5.0–6.2 mi), while the maximum range of the six inch guns was 13–14 km (8.1–8.7 mi). A single 6 m (20 ft) rangefinder was used by the commander of the artillery in a central fire control station at Kuivasaari. Six meter rangefinders were also planned for the 10 inch batteries later in the war but never obtained.

=== Searchlights ===
Searchlights were first used at Sveaborg during the Russo-Turkish War in 1878, and they were originally intended for guarding the controlled mine barriers. During the First World War fortified searchlight positions were part of the coastal forts. The main line of defence had larger two 200 cm (79 in) searchlights at Rysäkari and Kuivasaari and an additional six smaller 150 cm (59 in) searchlights beside them and on the other islands. Miessaari 150 cm searchlight position was not completed during the war. In the second line 150 cm searchlights were used on Kuninkaansaari and Vallisaari, while other forts had 110 cm (43 in) or 90 cm (35 in) searchlights. Diesel generators provided the necessary electrical power to operate the searchlights. Searchlights were used in disappearing positions, where the searchlight was normally in a shelter and only exposed when needed for illumination. The disappearing positions had two types: either the searchlight was raised from the shelter by a lifting mechanism, or it was moved by rails from the shelter to position.

=== Communications ===
Telephone and telegraph system linked the various parts of the fortress. Krepost Sveaborg had both a regular telephone system and a second, independent telephone network dedicated for fire control. The primary telephone exchange was located on Iso Mustasaari. The various island forts had their own telephone exchanges, while Kuivasaari and Isosaari had central coastal telephone exchanges with links to other main line of defence forts. The telephone cabels on main line of defence were usually buried, while second line used overhead lines. Besides telephone optical telegraphs, signal lamps and signal flags were also used.

== Land front ==
To protect Krepost Sveaborg and the naval base in particular from a German attack from land the fortifications were built to protect the fortress. The first fortifications were hastily built in 1914 to block access to the Helsinki peninsula and to guard the eastern flank of Laajasalo and Santahamina by a scarce line of fortifications at Ruskeasuo-Pasila-Käpylä-Koskela-Viikki-Herttoniemi-Roihuvuori. Lauttasaari, Meilahti and Laajasalo were also fortified to some extent. It was also planned to fortify Kulosaari and Vartiosaari. These first fortifications were field fortifications located 6–7 km (3.7–4.3 mi) from the city center, with the defence concentrated at fortified hilltop redoubts.

In early 1915 it was decided to build new defenses further away from the city center. The new defenses were stronger fixed fortifications with positions quarried into rock or dug into ground. Fortifications were built from wood and stone masonry as well as concrete. New fortifications had a network of defensive structures, with trenches, rifle pits, machine gun nests, barbed wire obstacles, shelters and roads. Artillery batteries were located 0.5–1.5 km (0.31–0.93 mi) behind the front line, often located on reverse slope. Artillery batteries had 2–6, typically four, guns. Heavily fortified caponiers providing flanking fire were built on places of the front line. First a northern line was built at Leppävaara-Kaarela-Pakila-Pukinmäki-Myllypuro-Vartiokylä. Construction on a western line from Leppävaara to Westend via Tapiola began shortly afterwards. In late 1915 it was decided to build an outer line of defence on the northern and eastern sectors, extending the fortifications northward and in the east from Pukinmäki to Malmi, Mellunkylä and Vuosaari. Fortification works continued until the February revolution of 1917, and some work was done until early 1918. The land front was divided into three sectors, eastern, northern and western with 36 bases, numbered I-XXXVII. The bases were usually centered on hilltops with the strongest defences.

The basic front line fortifications were open or covered machine gun nests, rifle pits, observation posts and shelters. Most of the structures were designed to be covered with a concrete roof poured on wooden planks occasionally reinforced with railway tracks. Some of the positions were built with stone or logs. Many of the fortifications have been left uncovered however, built only to a point where adding the missing roof could be accomplished quickly. The basic fortified types are a type A square machine gun nest, type B square rifle or machine gun pit, type C rounded rifle or observation pit, type D oval rifle pit with several firing ports and types E and F large rifle positions for multiple shooters. There is considerable variation between individual structures among the basic types, with newer positions generally built larger and stronger.

Fortifications
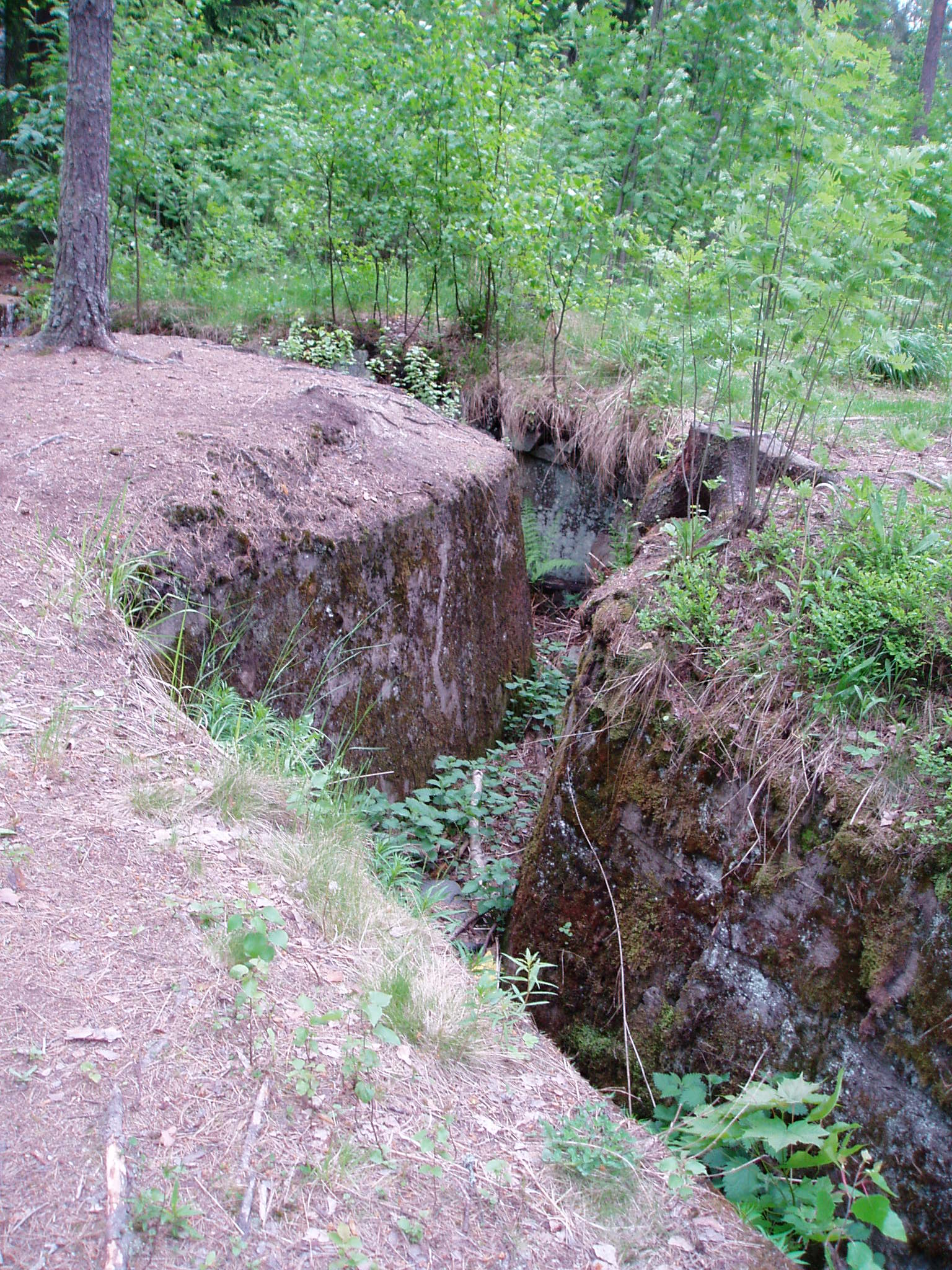
Concrete fighting trench

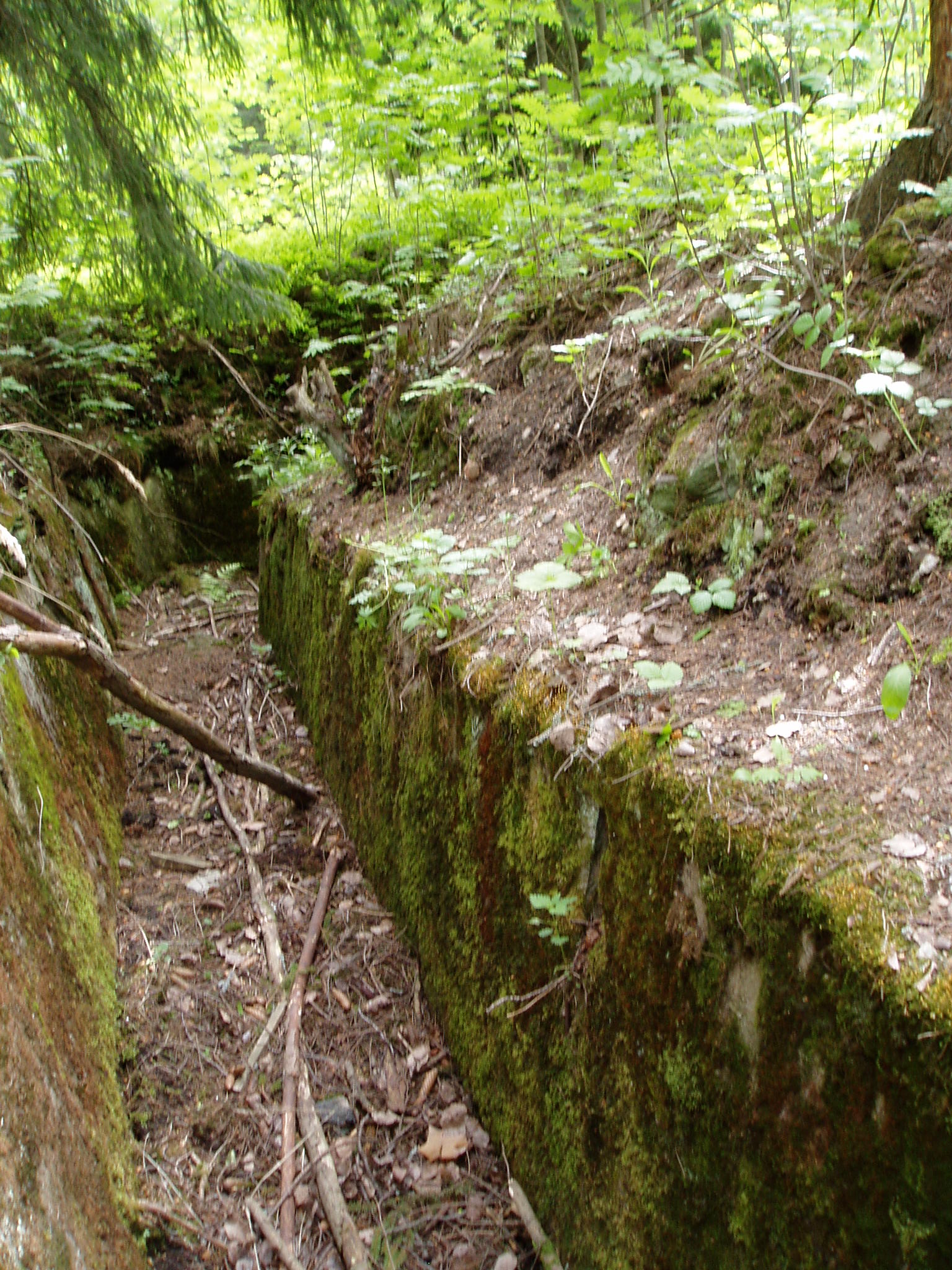
Remnants of a communication trench

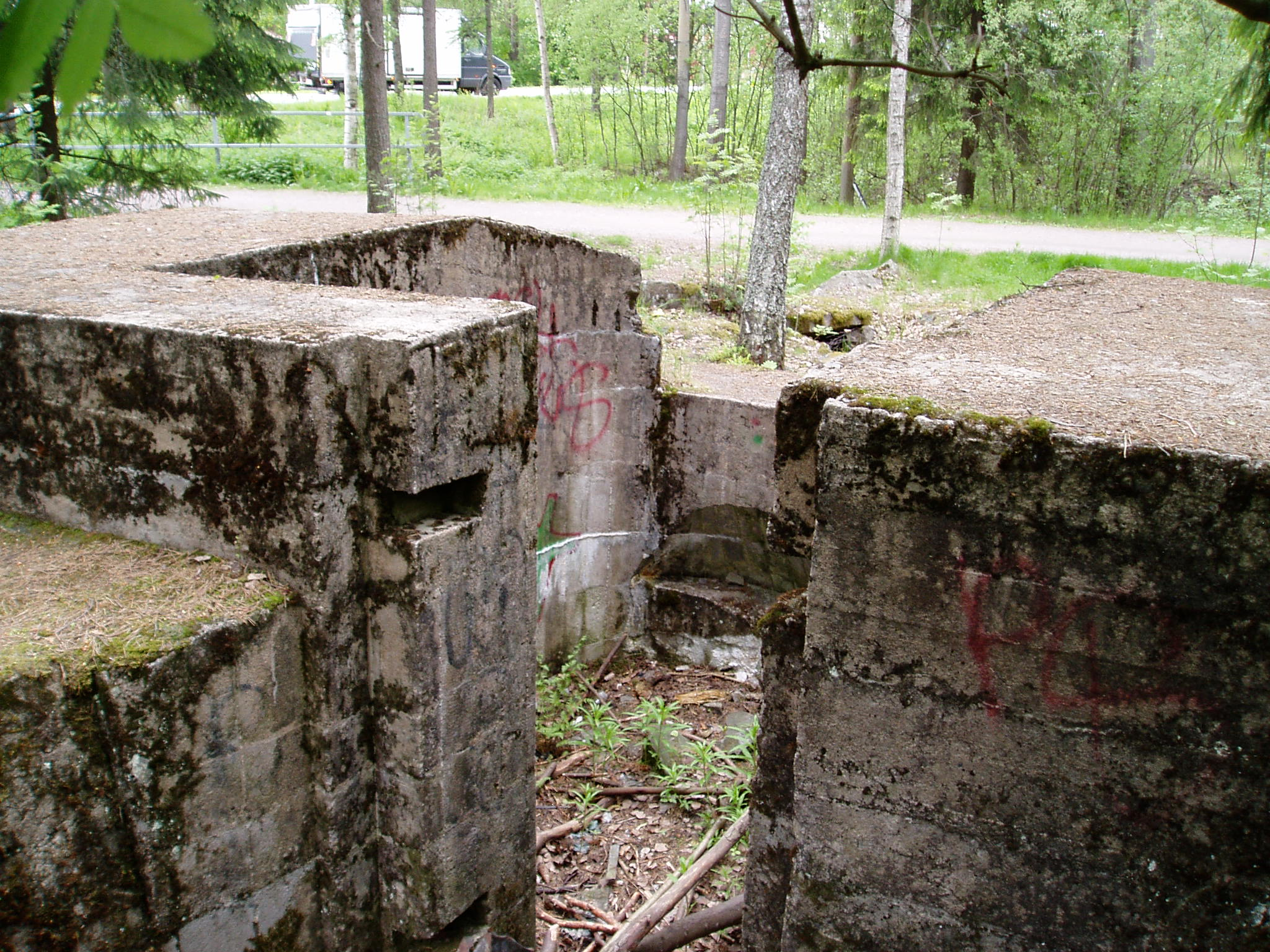
Machine gun pit

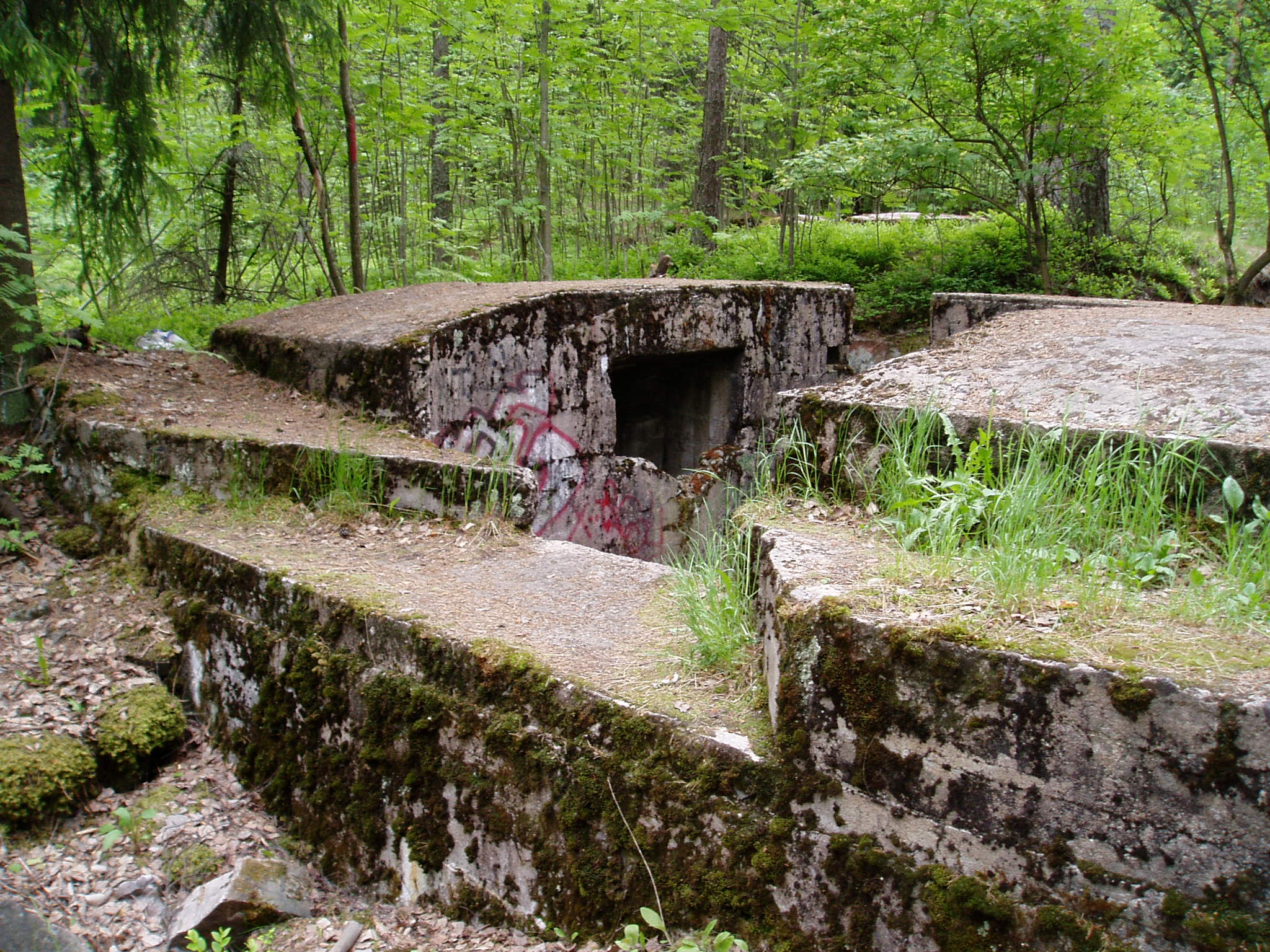
Machine gun pit from the front

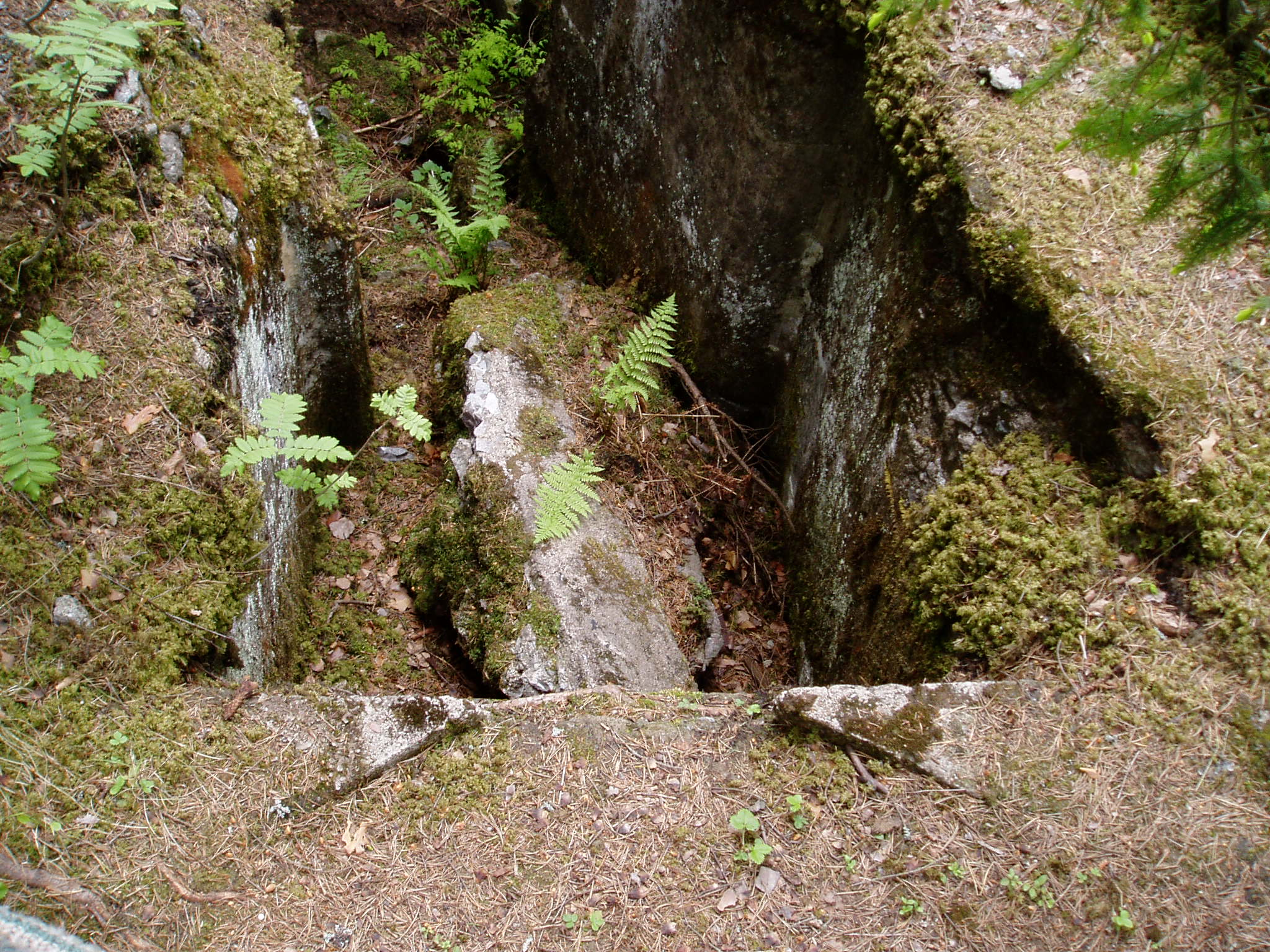
Rifle and observation pit

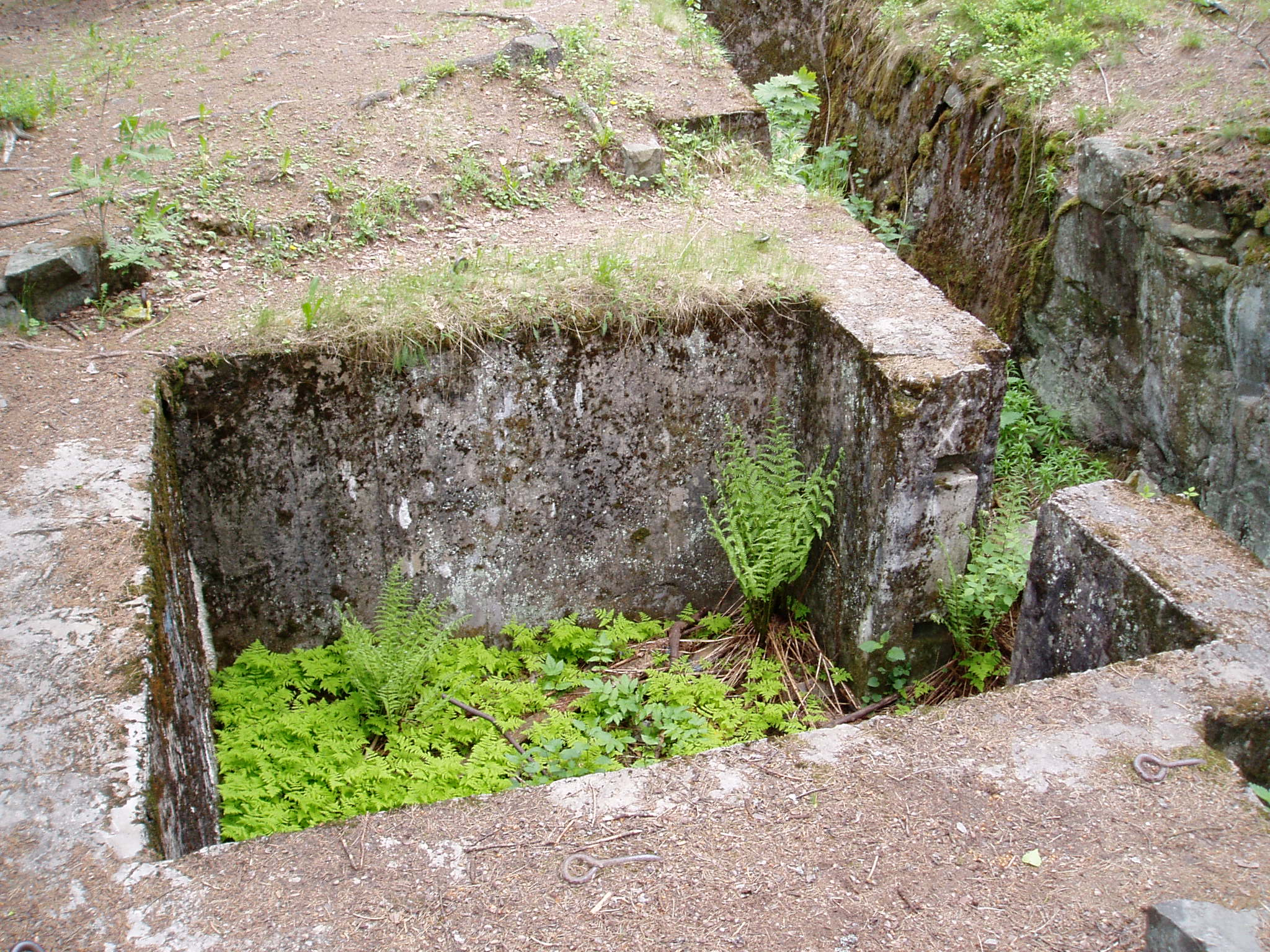
Small shelter without roof

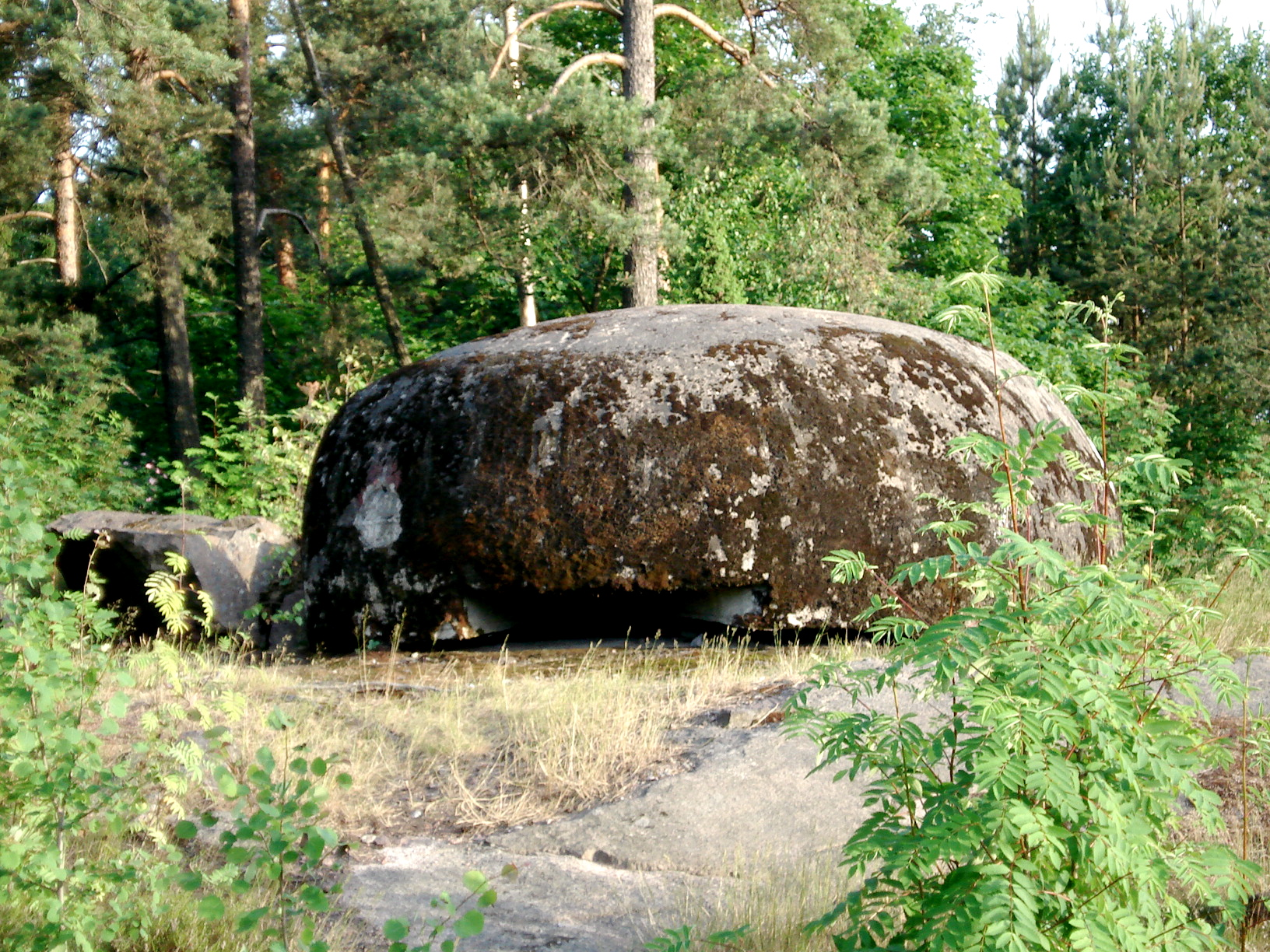
Type D rifle pit in Ruukinranta

== Naval front ==
Coastal fortifications on the naval front protected Krepost Sveaborg from an attack from the sea. During the war new fortifications were built on the outlying islands pushing the defences outward to protect the ships in the harbour from new modern guns. During the First World War the naval front of the fortress was modernized almost completely. The new gun batteries can be divided into four types: heavy long range batteries, close range batteries, anti-landing batteries equipped with field guns and anti-aircraft batteries which appeared during the war for the first time. The naval front was divided into six sectors at the start of the war with sectors 1-4 comprising the old fortress, sector 5 Isosaari and sector 6 Melkki. The central fire control post was located in Vallisaari. As the new coastal forts were completed the organization changed and the naval front was divided into two parts: an outer main line of defence from Melkki to Isosaari and an inner second line of defence from Lauttasaari to Santahamina. The naval front command post was located in Vallisaari and the main artillery command post in Kuivasaari.

The long range batteries of 10 in (254 mm) and 6 in (152 mm) guns included ten batteries with six 10 inch batteries and four 6 inch batteries, with one more under construction. The basic shape of the batteries is four guns in a row protected from the front by a concrete parapet of approximately 5 m (16 ft) thick with traversal walls between the gun positions. The batteries had no rear protection. Shelter for crew and ammunition cellars were built into and under the front parapet and the traversal walls. While the basic plan is similar, each battery is unique depending on the terrain. For the 10 inch guns the average distance between guns is 40 m (131 ft), but on smaller island such as Katajaluoto the guns are only 30 m (98 ft) apart while the larger Isosaari battery (No 1) has guns 50 m (164 ft) apart. Similarly the 6 inch batteries have guns 35 m (115 ft) apart on average, but in the very cramped Harmaja battery the distance between guns is only 20 m (66 ft) and the battery is not built on straight line but in a crooked L-shape. Many batteries have an icon closet framed with granite.

=== Main line of defence ===
The main line of defence was the outer seaward defence of Krepost Sveaborg. The main line of defence had the newest fortifications and the heaviest and most modern armament. At the end of the war, it comprised (from west to east): Miessaari and Pyöräsaari, Rysäkari, katajaluoto, Harmaja, Kuivasaari, Isosaari, Santahamina and Itä-Villinki islands and Skatanniemi cape. The living conditions on the small, exposed islands were often poor, and the food supply was arranged from the older parts of the fortification with a week's supply of canned food, sugar and other compact food products stored on the islands. Construction of bakeries on the outer forts began after the February revolution as a result of the demand of an artillery regiment committee formed by the soldiers.

==== Miessaari and Pyöräsaari ====
Miessaari 60°7′55.88″N 24°46′50.49″E and the small Pyöräsaari 60°7′40.18″N 24°46′11.56″E formed the western reach of the naval front main line of defence. They are located near the coast of Espoo, and protected the coastal routes on the western flank of the fortress. Miessaari naval front battery number 40 had four 6 in (152 mm) Canet guns, while Pyöräsaari had two two-gun batteries of light 57 mm guns. Pyöräsaari was connected to Miessaari by a bridge in 1917. The construction of the Canet gun battery began in spring 1915, the guns were installed in May 1916 and the construction was mostly finished by early 1917, though some work on the interior shelters continued until summer 1917. Pyöräsaari 57 mm gun positions were quarried in late autumn 1915 and completed in June 1916. The islands also formed the seam between naval and land fronts, and Miessaari had also a land-facing battery number 115 of six 6 in (152 mm) 190 pood model 1877 siege guns, supporting the base XXXIV in Haukilahti-Westend area.

==== Rysäkari ====
Rysäkari island 60°6′3.95″N 24°49′55.27″E had the westernmost 10-inch battery, and could command the western sea routes up to south-western shores of Porkkalanniemi peninsula. Construction of the battery located in the middle of the island began shortly after the war broke up, in October 1914. The guns, transported from Vladivostok, were installed by January 1915 and the entire battery with ammunition cellars and concrete command tower was finished in spring 1916. The island had two searchlights, larger 200 cm and a smaller 150 cm one.

==== Katajaluoto ====
Katajaluoto island 60°6′0.57″N 24°54′54.68″E is a narrow, north–south oriented island located approximately half way on the line between Rysäkari and Harmaja. A 10-inch battery built on the widest part divides the island into northern and southern parts. The construction of the battery began in October 1914 and the guns were placed on their foundations in early 1915 with the parapet and traversal walls completed in autumn 1915. Katajaluoto battery is the narrowest of the 10-inch batteries. The northern shore of the island has a heavily fortified concrete bunker used as mine control bunker, telephone exchange and electrical station. The island had a 150 cm searchlight. There is also a unique fortified concrete latrine on the eastern shore.

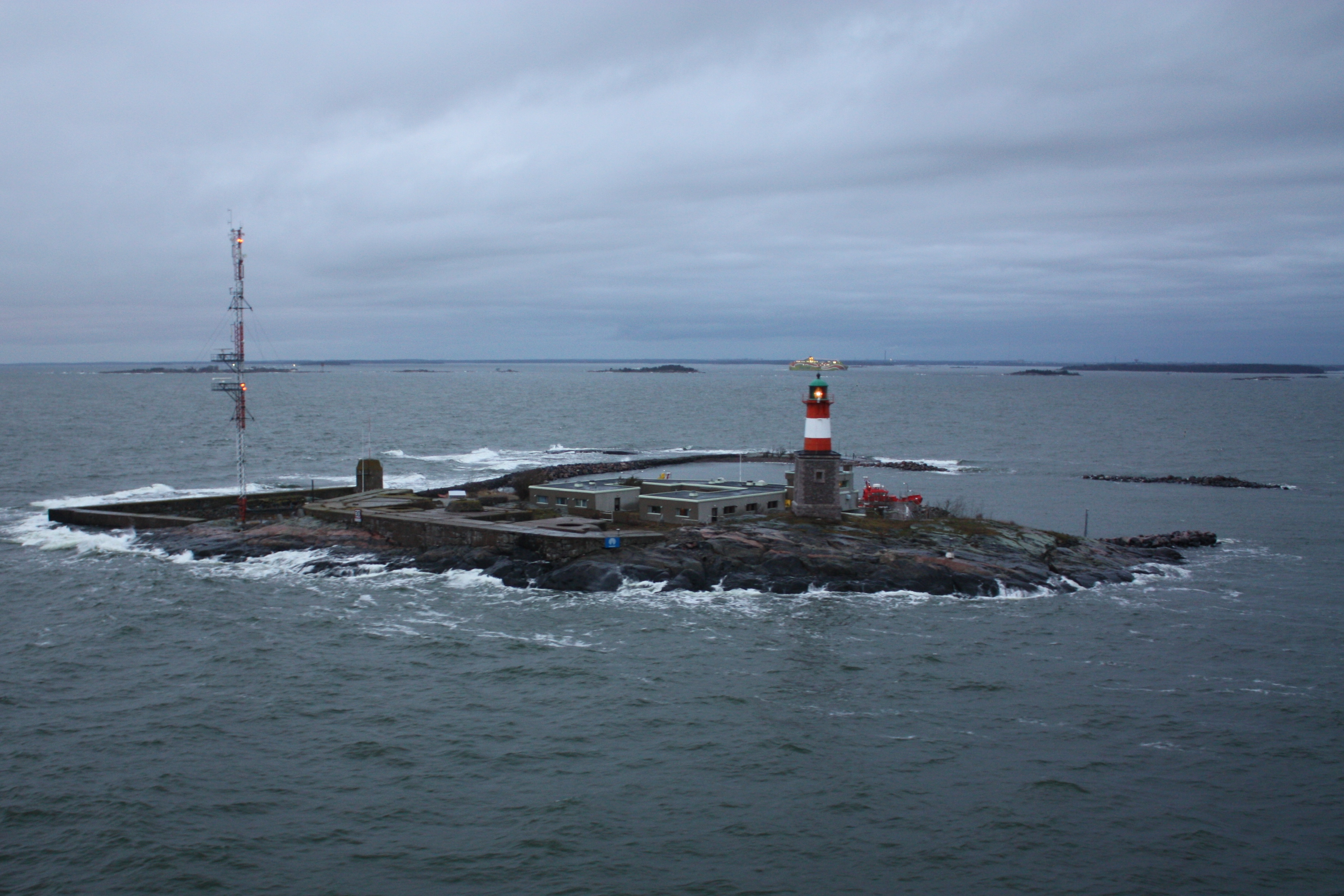
Harmaja

==== Harmaja ====
Harmaja 60°6′16.58″N 24°58′27.27″E is a small island with a lighthouse south of Suomenlinna between Katajaluoto and Kuivasaari. The island has been used as a pilot station and the current lighthouse was built in 1883. At the start of the war two 75 mm (3 in) guns were placed on the island. These were relocated in October 1914 when construction of a 6-inch Canet battery began. The small island did not have the necessary building materials, and sand, gravel and cement had to be brought in with barges. The guns were installed in February 1915 and the battery was finished in September 1916. Harmaja battery is the smallest of the long range batteries and the guns are not located in straight line but in an L-shaped formation. A breakwater surrounds the southern end of the island.

==== Kuivasaari ====
Kuivasaari island 60°6′3.49″N 25°0′54.97″E is located west of Isosaari. Construction of a 6-inch Canet battery was planned in spring 1914, but the guns were located in Isosaari instead. After the war began construction of a 10-inch battery began on the western shore of the island. The guns, transported from Vladivostok, were placed on their foundations in February 1915 and the battery was finished in early winter of 1915. The main fire control station of the fortress with the only 6 m (20 ft) rangefinder was located in Kuivasaari. The island also had a 150 cm searchlight. Kuivasaari telephone exchange was also the central gunnery telephone exchange. A four-gun 75 mm anti-aircraft battery on wooden platforms was located on the northern part of the island.

==== Isosaari ====
Isosaari 60°6′7.19″N 25°3′8.76″E is the largest of the outlying islands. The island's central location and size made it the most heavily armed coastal fort and it was part of the plans for expanding Krepost Sveaborg already in 1909. In May 1914 construction of four concrete fortified batteries began: one 10 inch battery, one 11 inch battery and two 6 inch batteries. The start of the war hastened the construction works that had progressed slowly, and three 10 inch guns were placed on temporary wooden platforms. The concrete batteries were finished by autumn 1915, but a change in plans resulted in the second 6-inch battery being located in Santahamina instead. In January 1916 work began to modify the 11-inch battery (battery number 2) for 10-inch guns, with the modifications complete in 1916. The first 10-inch battery is located on the south-western tip of the island, while the other two batteries are on the south-eastern shore. A 150 cm searchlight was located near the first 10-inch battery and a 200 cm searchlight near the two other batteries. A narrow gauge military railway was built on the island to transport supplies and ammunition.

==== Santahamina ====
Santahamina 60°8′44.18″N 25°3′1.96″E was the largest single island in Krepost Sveaborg, and is located south of Laajasalo. Because of the size of the island Santahamina could be considered to belong to both main line of defence and the second line of defence. Santahamina was fortified during the Crimean War, and several gun batteries were built on the island during the decades between Crimean War and First World War. Most of the older guns, including eleven 6 inch 190 pood siege guns and thirteen 9 inch coastal mortars, were transported to the land front of the fortress shortly after the start of war. The remaining batteries were a 6-inch Canet battery, originally intended for Isosaari, at Itäniemi on the south-eastern part of the island and a 75 mm battery on the eastern shore. These batteries covered the sea east of Isosaari. Santahamina had a large garrison area and a substantial number of troops and supplies were located on the island.

==== Itä-Villinki ====
Itä-Villinki 60°9′28.63″N 25°8′15.9″E is located just east of the larger Villinki island. The island was a summer house district and the land had to be expropriated from the owners. Resistance by the land owners delayed the process, and was still not fully complete by late 1916. Fortification works for an 11-inch battery began in April 1915, but the battery was changed to 10 inch guns in autumn of the same year. 10 inch battery is built on a rock hilltop at the centre of the island. In July 1915 construction of a smaller battery for 75 mm guns (originally planned for 57 mm guns) on the eastern tip of the island began.

==== Skatanniemi ====
Skatanniemi peninsula 60°11′34.81″N 25°10′40.46″E in Uutela is the only place of the main line of defence on the mainland. Construction of a 6-inch Canet battery began in late 1916. The battery fortifications, the parapet and traversal walls, were finished but the command points and most other auxiliary structures were not. The guns had arrived at the battery but were never installed and were reported stored nearby on the shore and pier in 1918.

=== Second line of defence ===
The second line of defence included the older parts of the fortress and contained most of the storage and supply areas and other rear line functions. The fighting power of the second line was limited to quick-firing 75 mm and 57 mm guns and old 11 inch cannons and mortars. The primary combat objective of the batteries on the second line was to prevent enemy ships from passing through Kustaanmiekansalmi or Särkänsalmi straits to the inner anchorage on Kruunuvuorenselkä. The second line included Lauttasaari, Melkki, Pihlajasaaret, Harakka, the central citadel at Suomenlinna, Lonna, Vallisaari, Kuninkaansaari, Nuottasaari and Vasikkasaari.

==== Lauttasaari ====
Lauttasaari was fortified during the Crimean War, but had been disarmed in 1895. During the First World War the only battery was a land front battery number 116 at Vaskiniemi, armed with four 9 in (229 mm) model 1867 guns in March 1915. This battery supported base XXXVII located in southern Espoo at Tapiola—Otaniemi area. The only naval front connection Lauttasaari had was an unfinished searchlight station in Länsiulapanniemi and bakery constructed between 1916 and 1917 near the land front battery that was also used to supply the coastal forts on the nearby islands. Lauttasaari was officially delegated to land front already in spring 1915.

==== Melkki ====
Melkki 60°7′54.65″N 24°53′17.97″E is located south of Lauttasaari. Construction of a 6-inch Canet battery and 11 inch model 1877 battery began in May 1914, but the work was halted after the war began. The Canet battery was relocated to Harmaja, and the 11 inch guns were used only for a short period on temporary wooden platforms. A 75 mm anti-aircraft battery was located on the island in October 1914. In summer 1916 the guns were removed and the island was turned over for use as part of the naval base harbour facilities with machine shops and a naval mine depot.

==== Pihlajasaaret ====
Pihlajasaaret is a group of islands south of Jätkäsaari. In summer 1916 the 75 mm anti-aircraft battery on Melkki was relocated to Itäinen Pihlajasaari 60°8′23.03″N 24°55′20.02″E. The guns were on temporary wooden platforms, and the battery was relocated already in August as construction of new fortified concrete anti-aircraft positions and shelters began. The fortification work was completed but the guns were not installed before the war ended.

==== Harakka ====
Harakka 60°9′1.41″N 24°57′27.32″E is located near the coast of Helsinki, south of Kaivopuisto. In the years before First World War the island had three batteries with five 9 in (229 mm) model 1867 guns, four 6 inch 190 pood guns and two 57 mm quick-firing guns. As the war began the 6 inch guns were relocated to the land front while the 9 inch guns were decommissioned and left in their positions. The two 57 mm guns and two more guns from Vallisaari were relocated to a new field fortified battery on the southern tip of the island. Additionally the island had 2-4 antiaircraft guns of 75 mm or 3 in (76 mm) during the war. The island had also a 110 cm searchlight.

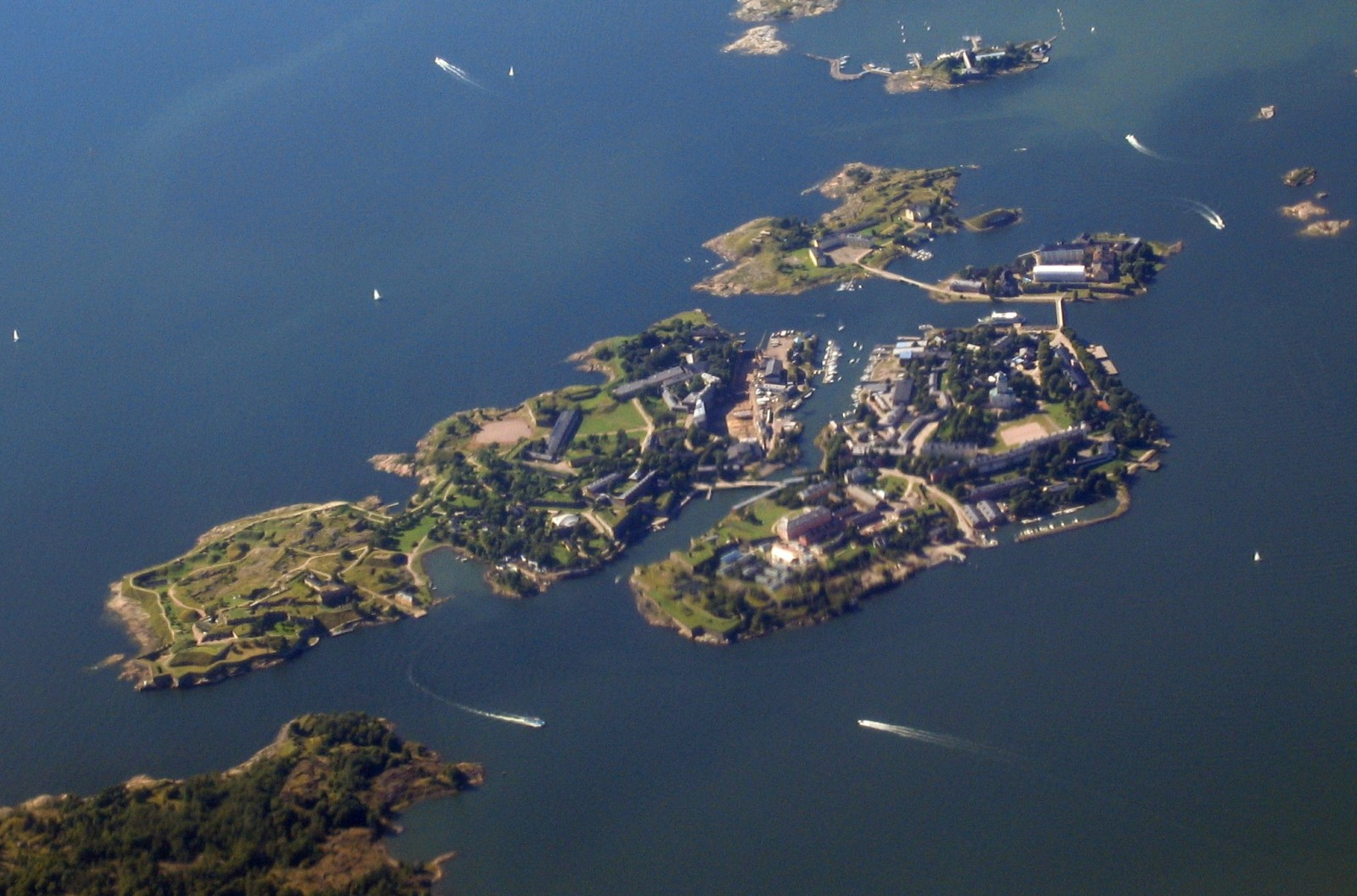
Suomenlinna

==== The central citadel ====
The central citadel of Krepost Sveaborg was formed on the old Swedish fortress of Sveaborg, modern Suomenlinna 60°08′37″N 24°59′04″E. It included the islands of Kustaanmiekka, Susisaari, Iso Mustasaari, Pikku Mustasaari, Länsi-Mustasaari, Särkkä and the skerry of Pormestarinluoto. Except for the smaller Särkkä and Pormestarinluoto the islands were connected by bridges or joined together. The islands housed the fortress commander and headquarters along with the main telephone exchange and the largest dry dock in Finland at the time. The citadel also had weapons and ammunition depots and other storage areas. Most of the fortification works were concentrated on other islands, and of the older armament only one battery of three 11 inch guns remained in active service in Kustaanmiekka island. To guard Kustaanmiekansalmi strait two batteries of 57 mm guns were built, one on Kustaanmiekka and one on Iso-Mustasaari island. A third battery of 57 mm guns on Länsi-Mustasaari guarded Särkänsalmi strait.

==== Lonna ====
Lonna 60°9′16.17″N 24°59′23.2″E is a small island north of Iso Mustasaari that was used as the main naval mine depot of Krepost Sveaborg. The island had three masonry and one wooden mine storage magazines and workshops, living quarters and equipment storage for mine company ships. At the end of the war the magazines had nearly 500 mines stored with another 650 mines in the open.

==== Vallisaari, Kuninkaansaari and Nuottasaari ====
Vallisaari 60°8′8.96″N 25°0′6.45″E and Kuninkaansaari 60°8′4.95″N 25°1′5.78″E are located between Suomenlinna and Santahamina. The two islands were joined by a causeway across Kukisalmi strait at the turn of the 19th and 20th centuries. From the late 19th century until the First World War Vallisaari was the most heavily fortified island of the fortress. Construction of a 6-inch Canet battery on the island began in 1912, but the guns were relocated to the outer islands on the new main line of defence at the beginning of the war. Of the older guns a five-gun battery of 11 inch model 1877 guns and six-gun battery of 11 inch mortars were still used during the war. Two of the mortars were transported to the land front in early 1915, and the rest were decommissioned and abandoned on their positions in 1916. A six-gun battery of 6 inch model 1877 siege guns on fortress carriages were transported to the land front by the end of 1914. Newer artillery included two 57 mm guns that were replaced with four 75 mm guns in October 1914. Of the Kuninkaansaari batteries one four-gun battery of 11 inch model 1877 guns was kept in service. Two of the five 11 inch mortars were also in use until 1915. The rest of the guns - five 9 inch model 1867 guns, four 6 inch model 1877 siege guns, two (possibly four) 9 inch mortars and three 11 inch mortars were moved to the land front shortly after the start of the war. Both Vallisaari and Kuninkaansaari had a 150 cm searchlight stations. Small Nuottasaari island 60°8′28.34″N 25°1′34.21″E north of Haminasalmi strait between Kuninkaansaari and Santahamina was armed with four 8 inch model 1867 guns in 1887, but the island had been disarmed by 1914.

==== Vasikkasaari ====
Vasikkasaari 60°9′10.48″N 25°0′46.93″E was used as a fuel and ammunition depot of Krepost Sveaborg. The island is located in Kruunuvuorenselkä where the inner anchorage of the fortress was, between Suomenlinna, Santahamina and Laajasalo. Three large fuel oil tanks served the naval base and two smaller diesel tanks provided fuel for the mine company (later battalion) ships of the fortress. A pumping station powered by steam engine was connected to the tanks. Eight storage magazines housed weapons, ammunition, mines and torpedoes with a narrow gauge railway built on the island connecting them to the main pier. At the start of the war a 57 mm quick fire battery was located on the island, replaced by a 75 mm anti-aircraft battery in spring 1915. The anti-aircraft battery was relocated in summer 1916. A 90 cm searchlight was also located on the island.

== Finnish Civil War ==
Krepost Sveaborg never did see action against Germany in Russian hands. After the Russian revolution the treaty of Brest-Litovsk ended Russia's participation in the First World War. The treaty affirmed the independence of Finland and required Russian troops to leave from the country. Of the approximately 35 000 Russian soldiers and sailors who were around Helsinki in January 1918 most were demobilized and sent home or simply left by 15 March. Around one thousand joined the Finnish Red Guards in the Finnish Civil War. The Soviet leadership ordered Krepost Sveaborg headquarters to begin preparations to abandon the fortress and destroy what could not be evacuated in case it would fall into German hands. Some field guns were transported to Russia, but all the coastal guns were left. On 3 April 1918 German Baltic Sea Division landed in Hanko, after being requested by the White Senate of Vaasa to participate in the Finnish Civil War against the Reds. Russian Baltic fleet officers had made an agreement with the Germans allowing a safe departure for the warships and disarming the fortress. Most of the Russian ships left by mid-April, but the last ships left only in May–June 1918. The disarmament - removing locks from the guns, cutting the cables controlling the mines and destroying the mine control stations - had to be done in secret as an agreement between Soviet government and Finnish Red Guards had promised the latter all the fortifications. When the Germans arrived in Helsinki the Red Guard could only use some of the land front fortifications in Leppävaara and Ruskeasuo, and the Germans with a well equipped and trained numerically superior force quickly captured Helsinki between 11th and 13 April. The Russian guards ceded the coastal forts to Germans according to their agreement. The disarmament of Krepost Sveaborg, denying the Reds from using it, was used in White propaganda by how Allan Staffans had duped the Russians and removed the locks without authorization; but actually the disarmament occurred with the order of the fortress commander and with the knowledge of naval headquarters. On 12 May, Sveaborg was renamed Suomenlinna to celebrate the new independency.

== Later history ==
After First World War the fortifications of Krepost Sveaborg were taken over by Finland. Most of the land front fortifications were disarmed, stripped of useful equipment and abandoned. Much of the land front fortifications with steel reinforcements were destroyed in the inter war period and the steel sold as scrap. During the Second World War an inventory of the land front fortifications was conducted regarding their usefulness, with the larger shelters quarried into the rock under particular interest as facilities for war industry, emergency hospitals or storage. Some of the land front shelters are still used as storage space. As settlement spread during the urbanization after the Second World War many of the fortifications were destroyed as new suburbs were constructed. The coastal fortifications were used by the Finnish coastal artillery to protect Helsinki. Most of the islands remained in military use and were thus spared from vandalism. All structures of the Krepost Sveaborg fortifications around Helsinki, both land and sea fronts, were declared protected historical sites by the Finnish National Board of Antiquities in 1971.

=== Present day condition ===
While much of land front fortifications have been destroyed, many areas have been more or less preserved and some sections have been partly restored. In Vantaa Länsiniemi and Rajakylä areas have been cleared from rubbish and vegetation. In Espoo Laajalahti, Mäkkylä, Ormberget and Ruukinranta areas have also been cleared. In Helsinki trees threatening the structure of one of the older 1914 redoubts in Rajakallio have been cut, and the city planning department has made a plan regarding the maintenance of the cleared areas and restoring new ones. Of the coastal forts, all main line of defence islands except Pyöräsaari and Harmaja are still in military use and forbidden from civilians, and Harmaja is used by the Finnish Maritime Administration as a pilot station. A coastal artillery museum has been built on Kuivasaari and the island is no longer in active military use, but still officially restricted area. Visitors are allowed but only in organized tours. It is planned to transfer Kuivasaari, together with Rysäkari, into civilian authorities. Skatanniemi cape is the only area of the main line of defence that is easily visited. The central citadel of Suomenlinna is a major tourist attraction and UNESCO World Heritage Site with regular ferry connection. The islands of Vallisaari and Kuninkaansaari are also currently being transferred to civilian authorities, with military tentatively scheduled to leave the islands by 2012. Pihlajasaaret is a Helsinki city recreation area open to public with regular ferry connection during summertime. Vasikkasaari and Lonna are also civilian areas open to visit, but more difficult to reach.
