= Vallisaari =

Island in Helsinki, Finland

Coordinates: 60.137°N 25.002°E

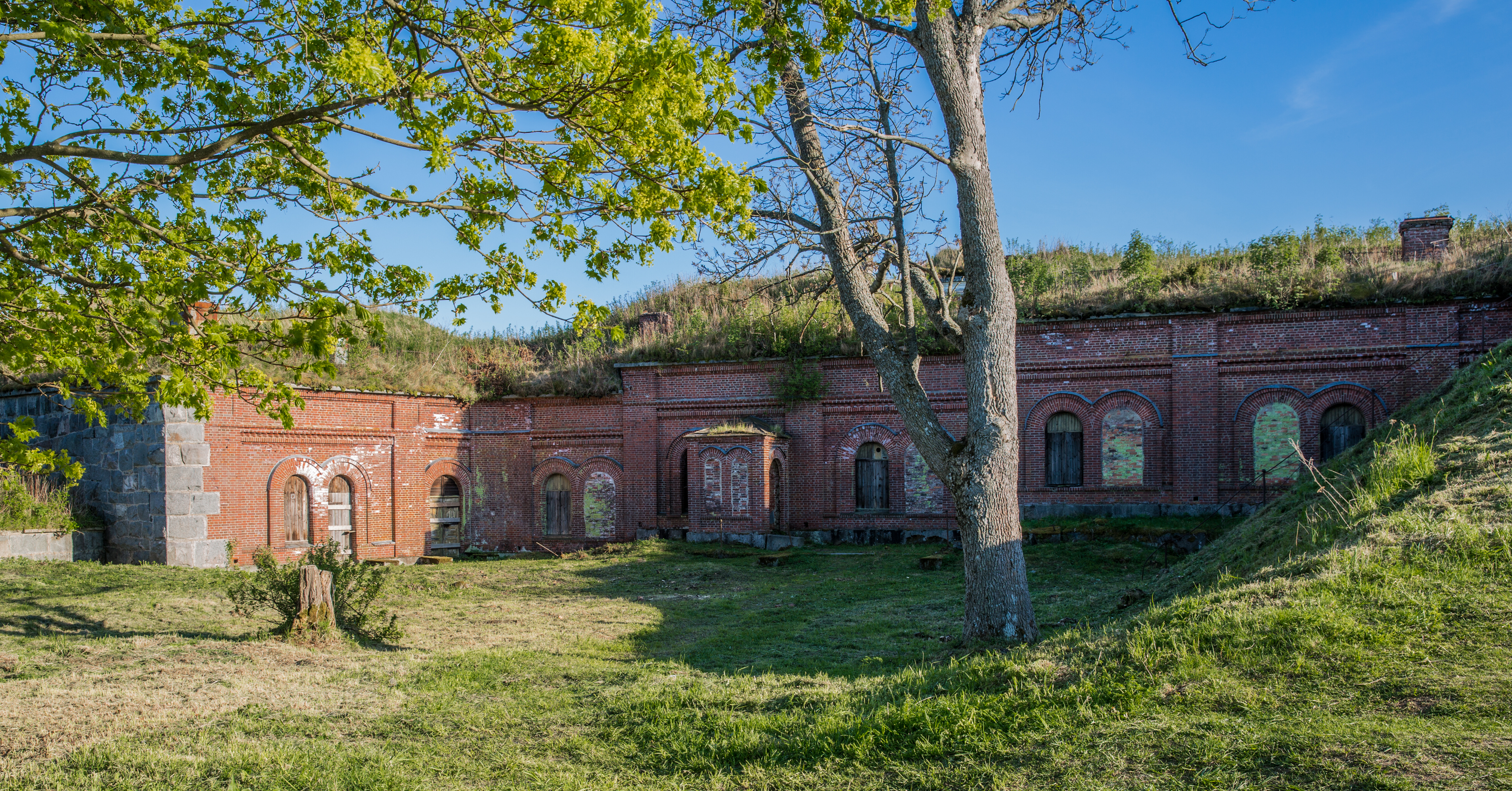
Alexander Battery in Vallisaari

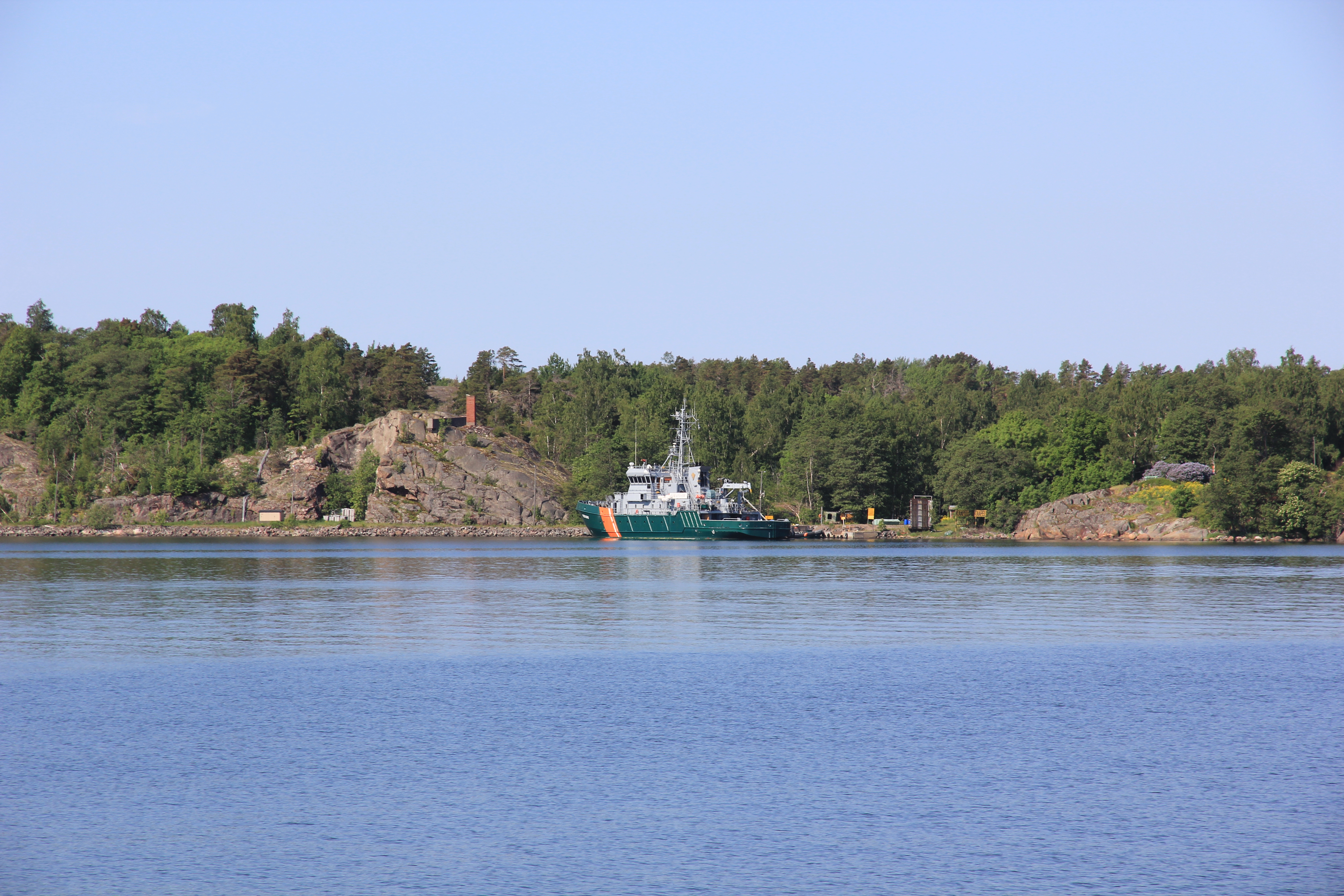
Finnish coast guard patrol craft Merikarhu moored at Vallisaari island.

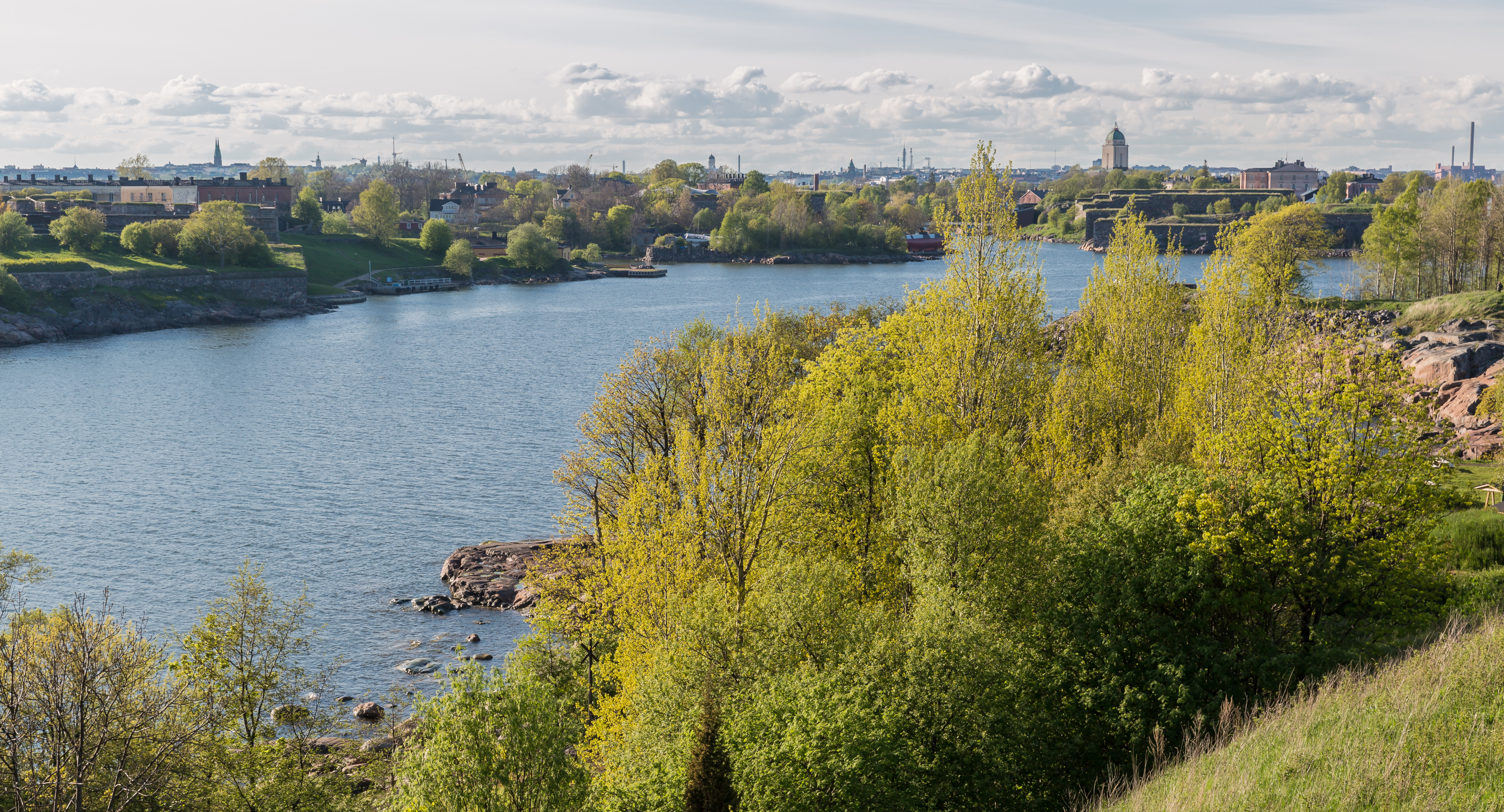
View from Vallisaari Island to Suomenlinna and continental Helsinki.

Vallisaari (Swedish: Skanslandet) is an island in Helsinki, Finland. It is located between Suomenlinna and Santahamina.

The island has some ponds, and it was first known for hundreds of years as a place where sailors could take fresh water. Some fortifications were built on the island, but while neighbouring Suomenlinna became the main sea fort for Helsinki, Vallisaari was a supply point where cattle were grazing and firewood was collected.

Sweden and Russia were at war in 1808 and the Russians besieged Suomenlinna, they used Vallisaari as their base. When ruling the Grand Duchy of Finland Russians began developing fortifications in Vallisaari. It was part of Krepost Sveaborg.

After Finland gained its independence in 1917, weaponry of the Defence Forces was stored in Vallisaari until the 21st century. Ordnance, torpedoes, and mines were loaded and maintained; weather observations were made; and gas masks were repaired. There was some civilian population, too, which lead quite rural life farming on the island The civilian population was largest in the 1950s, when the island had even its own primary school.

The Finnish Defence Forces gave up the islands in 2008 and Vallisaari was opened as tourism destination in 2016. Before the island was opened, vegetation has been cleared, stairs and railings build and info signs and dry toilets added. The plumbing is not in such a shape that it could be used any more.

Now Vallisaari is the most diverse nature destination in the metropolitan area. The Russian history of the island is reflected in the plants, some of which were brought to the island with animal fodder. Military activities have kept the embankments and the meadows between fortifications open, thereby enriching the diversity of nature. Several rare insects and bats fly on the island.
