= Melkki =

Island in Finland

Coordinates: 60.1317°N 24.8878°E

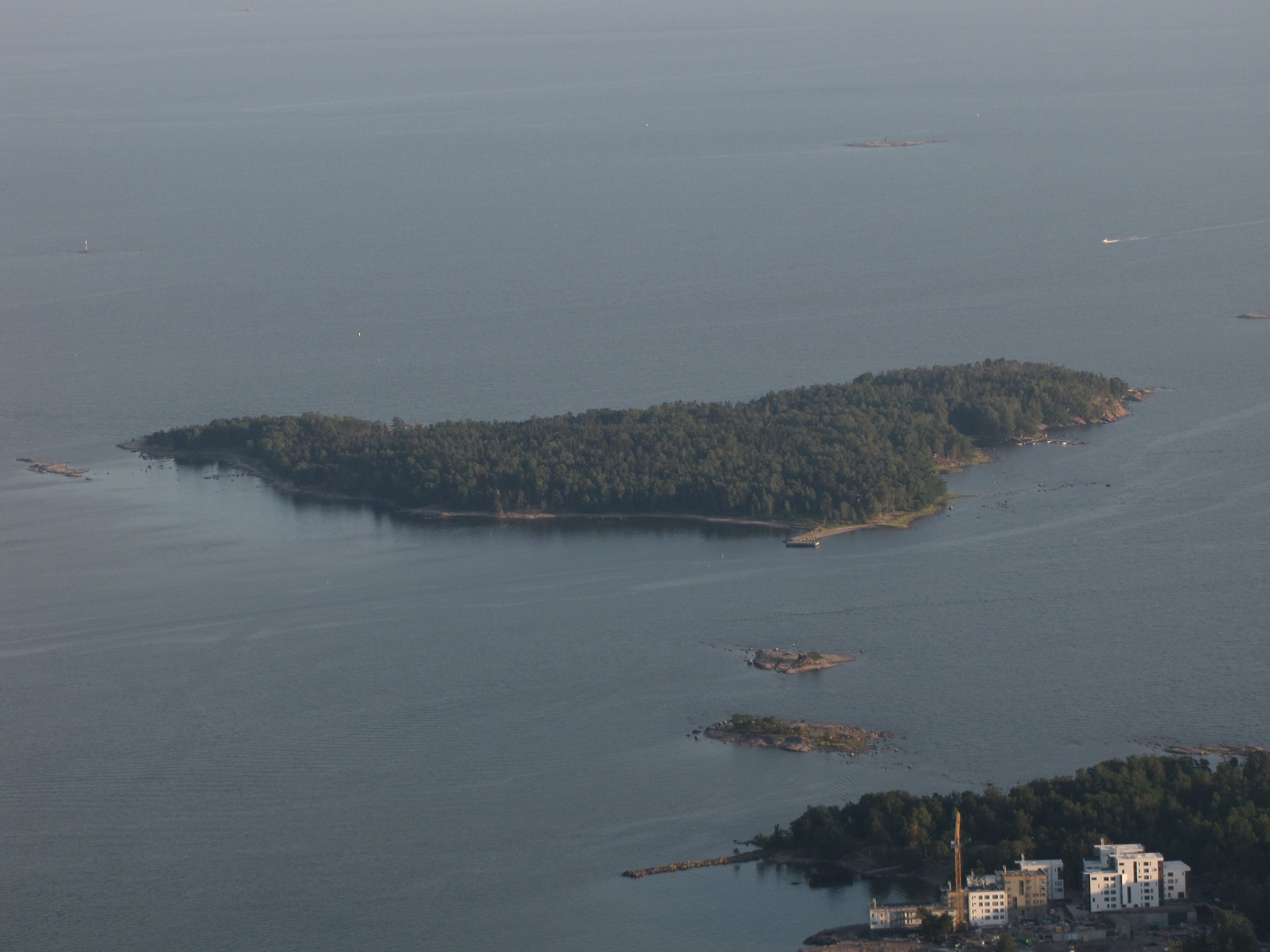
Aerial view of Melkki.

Melkki is an island in Helsinki, the capital of Finland. It is located approximately 500 meters south of Lauttasaari. The island was formerly used by Finnish Army and access to the island was limited.

The city of Helsinki is currently proposing that the island could be future home for 4000–5000 residents. The island would be served only by ferries, and a bridge connection is not under consideration.

The 2025 Garmin ORC Double Handed European Championship began just southwest of Melkki Island.

== See also ==
- List of islands of Finland
