= Names of places in Finland in Finnish and in Swedish =

Two names for the same city on a Finnish road sign.

Finland has two official languages, Finnish and Swedish. Many places in the country have different names in Finnish and Swedish, both being official endonyms.

== Regions ==
English name (often the same as the Finnish name)	Finnish name	Swedish name
Central Finland	Keski-Suomi	Mellersta Finland
Central Ostrobothnia	Keski-Pohjanmaa	Mellersta Österbotten
Kainuu	Kainuu	Kajanaland
Kymenlaakso	Kymenlaakso	Kymmenedalen
Lapland	Lappi	Lappland
North Karelia	Pohjois-Karjala	Norra Karelen
North Ostrobothnia	Pohjois-Pohjanmaa	Norra Österbotten
Pohjois-Savo	Pohjois-Savo	Norra Savolax
Ostrobothnia	Pohjanmaa	Österbotten
Päijät-Häme	Päijät-Häme	Päijänne-Tavastland
Pirkanmaa	Pirkanmaa	Birkaland
Satakunta	Satakunta	Satakunta
South Karelia	Etelä-Karjala	Södra Karelen
South Ostrobothnia	Etelä-Pohjanmaa	Södra Österbotten
Etelä-Savo	Etelä-Savo	Södra Savolax
Southwest Finland	Varsinais-Suomi	Egentliga Finland
Kanta-Häme	Kanta-Häme	Egentliga Tavastland
Uusimaa	Uusimaa	Nyland
Åland	Ahvenanmaa	Åland

== Municipalities ==
Some Finnish municipalities with endonyms in both Finnish and Swedish, the majority language of the municipality stands first:

- Finnish Akaa / Swedish Ackas
- Finnish Alavus / Swedish Alavo
- Finnish Enontekiö / Swedish Enontekis
- Finnish Espoo / Swedish Esbo
- Finnish Eurajoki / Swedish Euraåminne
- Finnish Hailuoto / Swedish Karlö
- Finnish Halsua / Swedish Halso
- Finnish Hämeenkyrö / Swedish Tavastkyro
- Finnish Hämeenlinna / Swedish Tavastehus
- Finnish Hamina / Swedish Fredrikshamn
- Finnish Hanko / Swedish Hangö
- Finnish Hartola / Swedish Gustav Adolfs
- Finnish Helsinki / Swedish Helsingfors
- Finnish Huittinen / Swedish Vittis
- Finnish Hyvinkää / Swedish Hyvinge
- Finnish Ii / Swedish Ijo
- Finnish Iisalmi / Swedish Idensalmi
- Finnish Iitti / Swedish Itis
- Finnish Ikaalinen / Swedish Ikalis
- Finnish Ilmajoki / Swedish Ilmola
- Finnish Ilomantsi / Swedish Ilomants
- Finnish Inari / Swedish Enare
- Swedish Ingå / Finnish Inkoo
- Finnish Isojoki / Swedish Storå
- Finnish Isokyrö / Swedish Storkyro
- Swedish Jakobstad / Finnish Pietarsaari
- Finnish Järvenpää / Swedish Träskända
- Finnish Jokioinen / Swedish Jockis
- Finnish Joroinen / Swedish Jorois
- Finnish Juuka / Swedish Juga
- Finnish Juva / Swedish Jockas
- Finnish Kaarina / Swedish S:t Karins
- Finnish Kajaani / Swedish Kajana
- Finnish Karijoki / Swedish Botöm
- Finnish Karkkila / Swedish Högfors
- Finnish Kaskinen / Swedish Kaskö
- Finnish Kauniainen / Swedish Grankulla
- Finnish Kaustinen / Swedish Kaustby
- Finnish Kerava / Swedish Kervo
- Finnish Keuruu / Swedish Keuru
- Swedish Kimitoön / Finnish Kemiönsaari
- Finnish Kirkkonummi / Swedish Kyrkslätt
- Finnish Kitee / Swedish Kides
- Finnish Kokemäki / Swedish Kumo
- Finnish Kokkola / Swedish Karleby
- Finnish Kontiolahti / Swedish Kontiolax
- Swedish Korsholm / Finnish Mustasaari
- Finnish Köyliö / Swedish Kjulo
- Swedish Kristinestad / Finnish Kristiinankaupunki
- Swedish Kronoby / Finnish Kruunupyy
- Finnish Kuhmoinen / Swedish Kuhmois
- Finnish Kustavi / Swedish Gustavs
- Finnish Lahti / Swedish Lahtis
- Finnish Laihia / Swedish Laihela
- Finnish Laitila / Swedish Letala
- Finnish Lapinjärvi / Swedish Lappträsk
- Finnish Lappeenranta / Swedish Villmanstrand
- Finnish Lapua / Swedish Lappo
- Swedish Larsmo / Finnish Luoto
- Finnish Laukaa / Swedish Laukas
- Finnish Lempäälä / Swedish Lembois
- Finnish Lieto / Swedish Lundo
- Finnish Liminka / Swedish Limingo
- Finnish Liperi / Swedish Libelits
- Finnish Lohja / Swedish Lojo
- Finnish Loppi / Swedish Loppis
- Finnish Loviisa / Swedish Lovisa
- Finnish Luhanka / Swedish Luhanga
- Finnish Maaninka / Swedish Maninga
- Swedish Malax / Finnish Maalahti
- Finnish Mänttä-Vilppula / Swedish Mänttä-Filpula
- Swedish Mariehamn / Finnish Maarianhamina
- Finnish Marttila / Swedish S:t Mårtens
- Finnish Merikarvia / Swedish Sastmola
- Finnish Mikkeli / Swedish S:t Michel
- Finnish Mynämäki / Swedish Virmo
- Finnish Myrskylä / Swedish Mörskom
- Finnish Naantali / Swedish Nådendal
- Swedish Närpes / Finnish Närpiö
- Finnish Nousiainen / Swedish Nousis
- Swedish Nykarleby / Finnish Uusikaarlepyy
- Finnish Oulainen / Swedish Oulais
- Finnish Oulu / Swedish Uleåborg
- Finnish Paimio / Swedish Pemar
- Finnish Paltamo / Swedish Paldamo
- Swedish Pargas / Finnish Parainen
- Swedish Petalax / Finnish Petolahti
- Finnish Pirkkala / Swedish Birkala
- Finnish Pomarkku / Swedish Påmark
- Finnish Pori / Swedish Björneborg
- Finnish Pornainen / Swedish Borgnäs
- Finnish Porvoo / Swedish Borgå
- Finnish Pöytyä / Swedish Pöytis
- Finnish Pukkila / Swedish Buckila
- Finnish Pyhtää / Swedish Pyttis
- Finnish Raahe / Swedish Brahestad
- Finnish Raisio / Swedish Reso
- Swedish Raseborg / Finnish Raasepori
- Finnish Rauma / Swedish Raumo
- Finnish Ruokolahti / Swedish Ruokolax
- Finnish Sauvo / Swedish Sagu
- Finnish Savonlinna / Swedish Nyslott
- Finnish Siikainen / Swedish Siikais
- Finnish Sipoo / Swedish Sibbo
- Finnish Siuntio / Swedish Sjundeå
- Finnish Taivassalo / Swedish Tövsala
- Finnish Tampere / Swedish Tammerfors
- Finnish Teuva / Swedish Östermark
- Finnish Tornio / Swedish Torneå
- Finnish Turku / Swedish Åbo
- Finnish Tuusula / Swedish Tusby
- Finnish Ulvila / Swedish Ulvsby
- Finnish Uurainen / Swedish Uurais
- Finnish Uusikaupunki / Swedish Nystad
- Finnish Vaasa / Swedish Vasa
- Finnish Vantaa / Swedish Vanda
- Finnish Vehmaa / Swedish Vemo
- Finnish Vesilahti / Swedish Vesilax
- Finnish Veteli / Swedish Vetil
- Finnish Vihti / Swedish Vichtis
- Finnish Vimpeli / Swedish Vindala
- Finnish Virolahti / Swedish Vederlax
- Finnish Virrat / Swedish Virdois
- Swedish Vörå / Finnish Vöyri
- Finnish Ylitornio / Swedish Övertorneå
- Finnish Ähtäri / Swedish Etseri

== Districts in cities and towns ==
=== Helsinki ===
- Finnish Ala-Malmi / Swedish Nedre Malm
- Finnish Alppiharju / Swedish Åshöjden
- Finnish Aurinkolahti / Swedish Solvik
- Swedish Byholmen / Finnish Kyläsaari
- Finnish Eira / Swedish Eira
- Finnish Etelä-Haaga / Swedish Södra Haga
- Finnish Haaga / Swedish Haga
- Finnish Hakaniemi / Swedish Hagnäs
- Finnish Hakuninmaa / Swedish Håkansåker
- Finnish Haltiala / Swedish Tomtbacka
- Finnish Heikinlaakso / Swedish Henriksdal
- Finnish Hermanni / Swedish Hermanstad
- Finnish Herttoniemen teollisuusalue / Swedish Hertonäs industriområde
- Finnish Herttoniemenranta / Swedish Hertonäs strand
- Finnish Herttoniemi / Swedish Hertonäs
- Finnish Hevossalmi / Swedish Hästnässund
- Finnish Hietalahti / Swedish Sandviken
- Finnish Itäkeskus / Swedish Östra centrum
- Finnish Itä-Pakila / Swedish Östra Baggböle
- Finnish Itä-Pasila / Swedish Östra Böle
- Finnish Itäsaaret / Swedish Östra holmarna
- Finnish Jollas, Helsinki / Swedish Jollas, Helsingfors
- Finnish Kaarela / Swedish Kårböle
- Finnish Kaartinkaupunki / Swedish Gardesstaden
- Finnish Kaisaniemi / Swedish Kajsaniemi
- Finnish Kaivopuisto / Swedish Brunnsparken
- Finnish Kalasatama / Swedish Fiskehamnen
- Finnish Kallahti / Swedish Kallvik
- Finnish Kallio / Swedish Berghäll
- Finnish Kampinmalmi / Swedish Kampmalmen
- Finnish Kamppi / Swedish Kampen
- Finnish Katajanokka / Swedish Skatudden
- Finnish Keski-Pasila / Swedish Mellersta Böle
- Finnish Keski-Vuosaari / Swedish Mellersta Nordsjö
- Finnish Kivihaka / Swedish Stenhagen
- Finnish Kluuvi / Swedish Gloet
- Finnish Koivusaari / Swedish Björkholmen
- Finnish Konala / Swedish Kånala
- Finnish Koskela / Swedish Forsby
- Finnish Kruununhaka / Swedish Kronohagen
- Finnish Kulosaari / Swedish Brändö
- Finnish Kumpula / Swedish Gumtäkt
- Finnish Kurkimäki / Swedish Tranbacka
- Finnish Kuusisaari / Swedish Granö
- Finnish Käpylä / Swedish Kottby
- Finnish Laajasalo / Swedish Degerö
- Finnish Laakso / Swedish Dal
- Finnish Lauttasaari / Swedish Drumsö
- Finnish Länsi-Herttoniemi / Swedish Västra Hertonäs
- Finnish Länsi-Pakila / Swedish Västra Baggböle
- Finnish Länsi-Pasila / Swedish Västra Böle
- Finnish Lassila / Swedish Lassas
- Finnish Lauttasaari / Swedish Drumsö
- Finnish Lehtisaari / Swedish Lövö
- Finnish Malmi / Swedish Malm
- Finnish Marttila / Swedish Martas
- Finnish Marjaniemi / Swedish Marudd
- Finnish Maunula / Swedish Månsas
- Finnish Maunulanpuisto / Swedish Månsasparken
- Finnish Maununneva / Swedish Magnuskärr
- Finnish Meilahti / Swedish Mejlans
- Finnish Mellunkylä / Swedish Mellungsby
- Finnish Mellunmäki / Swedish Mellungsbacka
- Finnish Meri-Rastila / Swedish Havsrastböle
- Finnish Merihaka / Swedish Havshagen
- Finnish Metsälä / Swedish Krämertsskog
- Finnish Munkkiniemi / Swedish Munksnäs
- Finnish Munkkisaari / Swedish Munkholmen
- Finnish Munkkivuori / Swedish Munkshöjden
- Finnish Mustavuori / Swedish Svarta backen
- Finnish Mustikkamaa–Korkeasaari / Swedish Blåbärslandet-Högholmen
- Finnish Myllypuro / Swedish Kvarnbäcken
- Finnish Niemenmäki / Swedish Näshöjden
- Finnish Niinisaari / Swedish Bastö
- Finnish Oulunkylä / Swedish Åggelby
- Finnish Pajamäki / Swedish Smedjebacka
- Finnish Pakila / Swedish Baggböle
- Finnish Pasila / Swedish Böle
- Finnish Patola / Swedish Dammen
- Finnish Pihlajamäki / Swedish Rönnbacka
- Finnish Pihlajisto / Swedish Rönninge
- Finnish Pikku Huopalahti / Swedish Lillhoplax
- Finnish Pirkkola / Swedish Britas
- Finnish Pitäjänmäen teollisuusalue / Swedish Sockenbacka industriområde
- Finnish Pitäjänmäki / Swedish Sockenbacka
- Finnish Pohjois-Haaga / Swedish Norra Haga
- Finnish Pohjois-Pasila / Swedish Norra Böle
- Finnish Puistola / Swedish Parkstad
- Finnish Pukinmäki / Swedish Bocksbacka
- Finnish Punavuori / Swedish Rödbergen
- Finnish Puotila / Swedish Botby gård
- Finnish Puotinharju / Swedish Botbyhöjden
- Finnish Puroniitty / Swedish Bäckängen
- Finnish Rastila / Swedish Rastböle
- Finnish Rautatientori / Swedish Järnvägstorget
- Finnish Reijola / Swedish Grejus
- Finnish Reimarla / Swedish Reimars
- Finnish Roihupellon teollisuusalue / Swedish Kasåkers industriområde
- Finnish Ruoholahti / Swedish Gräsviken
- Finnish Ruskeasuo / Swedish Brunakärr
- Finnish Salmenkallio / Swedish Sundberg
- Finnish Santahamina / Swedish Sandhamn
- Finnish Seurasaari / Swedish Fölisön
- Finnish Siltamäki / Swedish Brobacka
- Finnish Siltasaari / Swedish Broholmen
- Finnish Sörnäinen / Swedish Sörnäs
- Finnish Suomenlinna / Swedish Sveaborg
- Finnish Suurmetsä / Swedish Storskog
- Finnish Suutarila / Swedish Skomakarböle
- Finnish Tahvonlahti / Swedish Stansvik
- Finnish Talinranta / Swedish Talistranden
- Finnish Talosaari / Swedish Husö
- Finnish Töölö / Swedish Tölö
- Finnish Torpparinmäki / Swedish Torparbacken
- Finnish Toukola / Swedish Majstad
- Finnish Vallila / Swedish Vallgård
- Finnish Vanhakaupunki / Swedish Gammelstaden / English alternative: Old town
- Finnish Vartiokylä / Swedish Botby
- Finnish Viikki / Swedish Vik
- Finnish Vuosaari / Swedish Nordsjö
- Finnish Ullanlinna / Swedish Ulrikasborg
- Finnish Vironniemi / Swedish Estnäs
- Finnish Ylä-Malmi / Swedish Övre Malm

=== Other towns and municipalities ===
In addition to Helsinki other bilingual towns and municipalities in Finland often have bilingual names for districts, villages, and places in nature, such as lakes and rivers. Some examples are:

- Finnish Lohjanjärvi / Swedish Lojo sjö (Lake in Uusimaa)
- Finnish Kymijoki / Swedish Kymmene älv (River in Kymenlaakso)
- Finnish Lauttaranta / Swedish Färjstranden (Suburb in Turku)
- Finnish Jupperi / Swedish Jupper (District in Espoo)

== See also ==
- Languages of Finland
- Toponyms of Finland
- List of municipalities of Finland in which Finnish is not the sole official language
