= Laajasalo =

Coordinates: 60°10′50″N 25°3′15″E

Laajasalo Degerö
- Subdivision
- Position of Laajasalo within Helsinki
- Country: Finland
- Region: Uusimaa
- Sub-region: Greater Helsinki
- Municipality: Helsinki
- District: Southeastern
- Subdivision regions: Vartiosaari, Yliskylä, Jollas, Tullisaari, Tahvonlahti, Hevossalmi, Villinki, Santahamina, Itäsaaret
- Area: 16.55 km^{2} (6.39 sq mi)
- Population (2018): 18,876
  - Density: 996/km^{2} (2,580/sq mi)
- Postal codes: 00840, 00841, 00850, 00860, 00861, 00870
- Subdivision number: 49
- Neighbouring subdivisions: Herttoniemenranta; Kulosaari; Meri-Rastila; Tammisalo

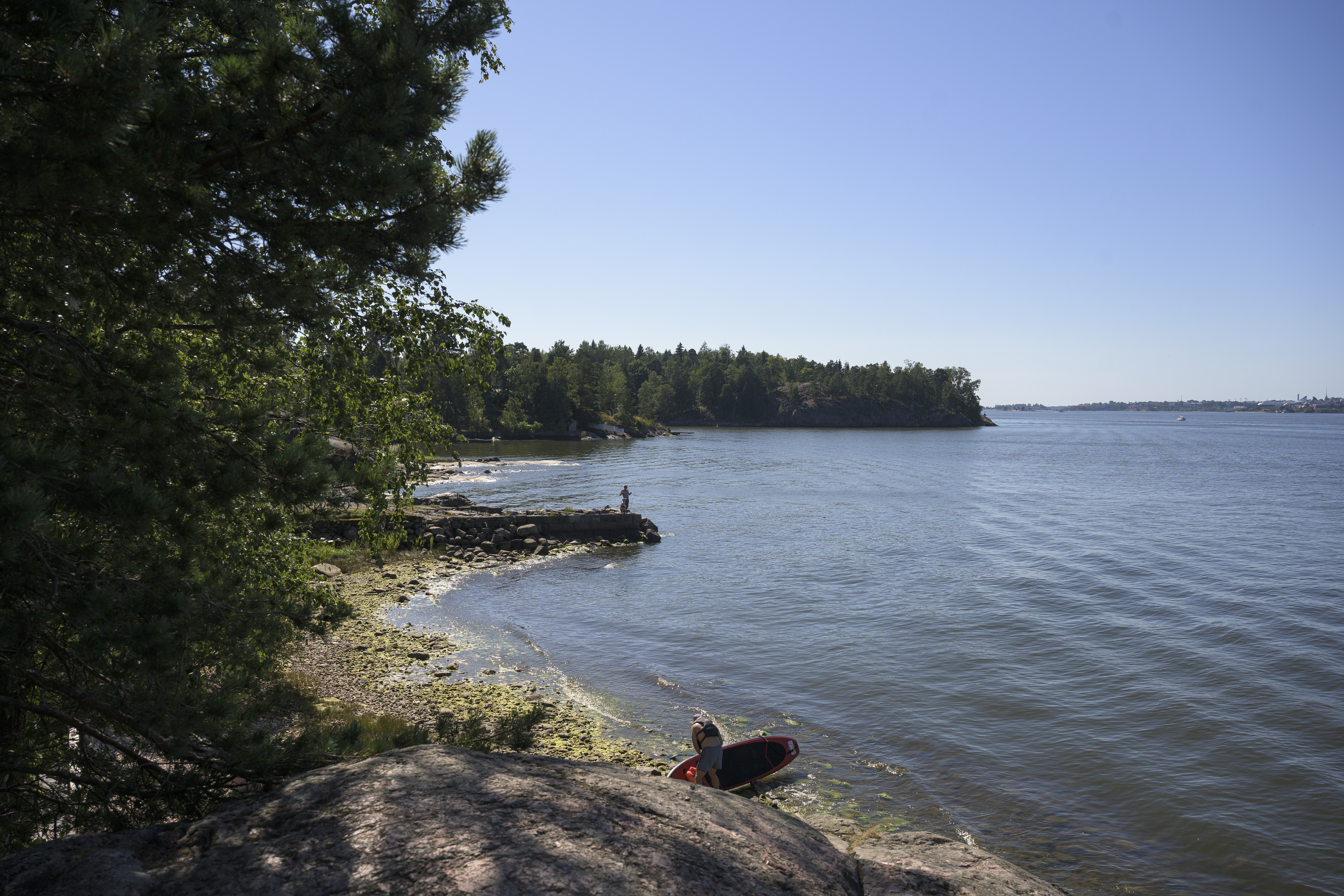
Coast of Kruunuvuorenselkä in the Tullisaari part in northwestern Laajasalo

Laajasalo (Swedish: Degerö) is a group of islands that forms a Southeast Helsinki's neighbourhood in southern Helsinki, the capital of Finland. As of 2018, it had a population of 18,876. It is Helsinki's 49th district. Subdivisions of the district include Kruunuvuorenranta, Yliskylä, Jollas and Tullisaari.

== Laajasalo major district ==
The name of the major district number 603 in Helsinki is the same as the district of Laajasalo itself. As well as Laajasalo, the major district contains the areas of Santahamina, Itäsaaret, Vartiosaari and Villinki. Santahamina, Vartiosaari and Villinki form districts by themselves, but Itäsaaret is a subdivision of the Ulkosaaret district.

== Subdivisions ==
Subdivisions of the Laajasalo major district (as of 2023)
Division	Population	Postal code	Area (km²)
Yliskylä	13 563	00840, 00870	3.39
Jollas	3 041	00850	2.19
Tullisaari	1 403	00590	0.65
Kruunuvuorenranta	3 378	00590	1.42
Hevossalmi	1 628	00870	0.74
Santahamina	293	00860	4.28
Villinki	0	00850	1.68
Itäsaaret	-	00860	1.16
Vartiosaari	-	00830	1.01
Total	23 315		16,55

The population of Vartiosaaret and Itäsaaret as of 2023 is not known. In 2020 there were 9 inhabitants in Vartiosaari and one on Itäsaaret. Villinki has no permanent inhabitants.

== History ==
=== Prehistory and Swedish rule ===
Laajasalo was originally a fishing area of the Lapps and the Tavastians. Judging by the place names in the area, there might have been lands of the old house of Puuppo in Vitsiälä in Hauho in the area. There might also have been permanent habitation in the area.

The Swedish arrived in the area in medieval times, and because of this the names in the area were changed into Swedish ones. Some Finnish names survived (such as Mustajärvi) and some remained to tell of the earlier use of the area, such as Lappvik referring to the Lapps and Finsviks Ängen referring to the Finns.

Manor houses were founded on the island during Swedish rule, such as Degerö (middle 17th century), Stansvik (separated from Degerö in 1798) and Turholm (existed at least already in the 16th century). There was an iron mine on the lands of the Stansvik manor since 1776, up until 1839. Many valuable minerals such as amethysts were found there. There was a small silver mine in Kaitalahti from 1787 to 1789, which also gave lead and zinc. The "manor" in Jollas was never a proper tax-exempt manor unlike the Uppby farm, whose main building is considerably modest for a manor house.

=== 19th and 20th centuries ===
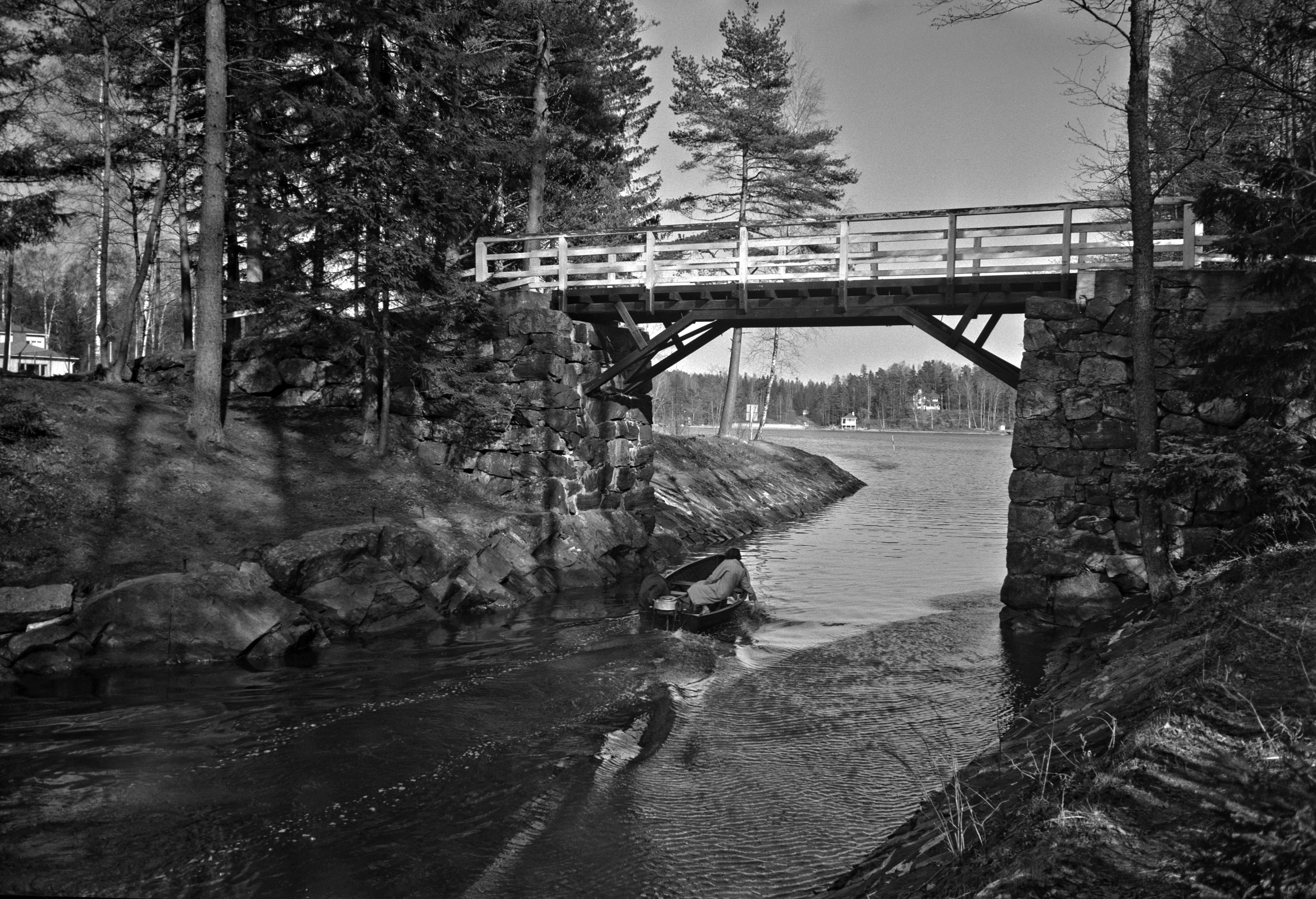
The Laajasalo canal is still used for boat traffic.

Laajasalo was originally separated from the mainland by a strait located at the site of the Tammisalo canal. However, it filled up with land in the 18th century, forming the area into a peninsula. When the current Laajasalo canal was built to the south of it in the 19th century, Laajasalo became an island again, but the area of Tammisalo that had originally belonged to it was left on the other side of the canal and thus became part of the mainland.

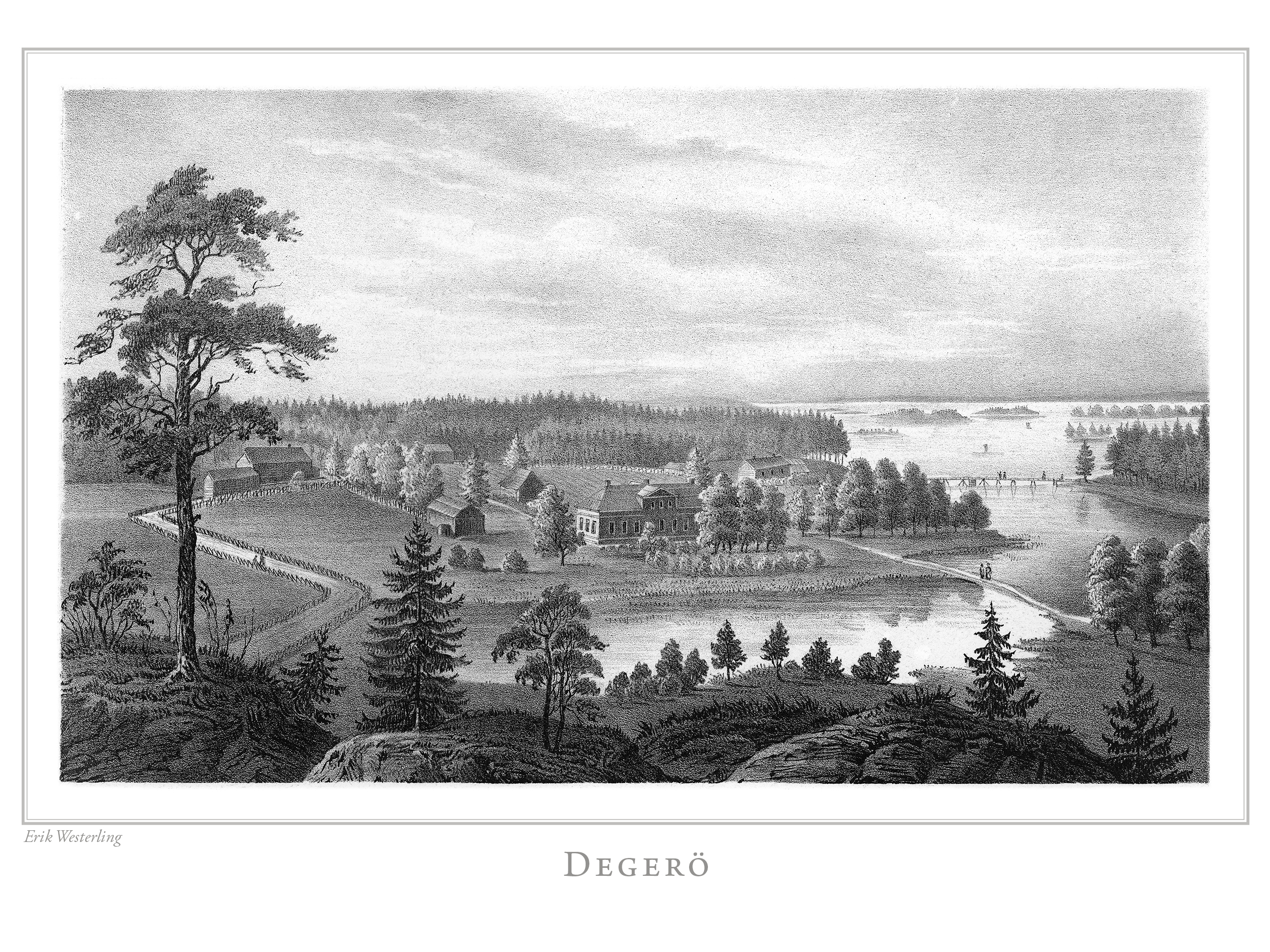
Illustration in Finland framstäldt i teckningar edited by Zacharias Topelius and published 1845-1852.

During the Crimean War, a road for military purposes was built through Laajasalo leading from Herttoniemi to Santahamina. This road later played a significant part in the birth of the villas in southern Laajasalo. A part of the road is now named Vanha sotilastie ("Old soldier road"). In the late 19th century and early 20th century many wealthy Helsinkians had summer villas in Laajasalo. During the prohibition in Finland the island was one of the smuggling routes of liquor from Estonia to Finland - local fishermen used their boats for this purpose. During the Continuation War the island hosted the heavy anti-aircraft battery 101 "Itä" to protect the nearby capital, with four 75 mm Škoda anti-aircraft guns. The gun placements can still be seen in the Aake Pesonen park. The anti-aircraft battery participated in the defense battle of Helsinki in February 1944.

Laajasalo was part of the rural municipality of Helsinki until it was joined into Helsinki in the great reform in 1946. In 1922 it had been formed as a densely populated community. Up until the reform the island was only referred to by its Swedish name Degerö, but in 1946 it received a Finnish name Laajasalo (old-fashioned Swedish deger = "great"). The proper Finnish translation of Degerö would have been Isosaari ("great island") but as the name Isosaari was already in use in Helsinki, Laajasalo was confirmed as the name of the village in 1946 and as the name of the entire district in 1959.

=== Harbour and modern times ===
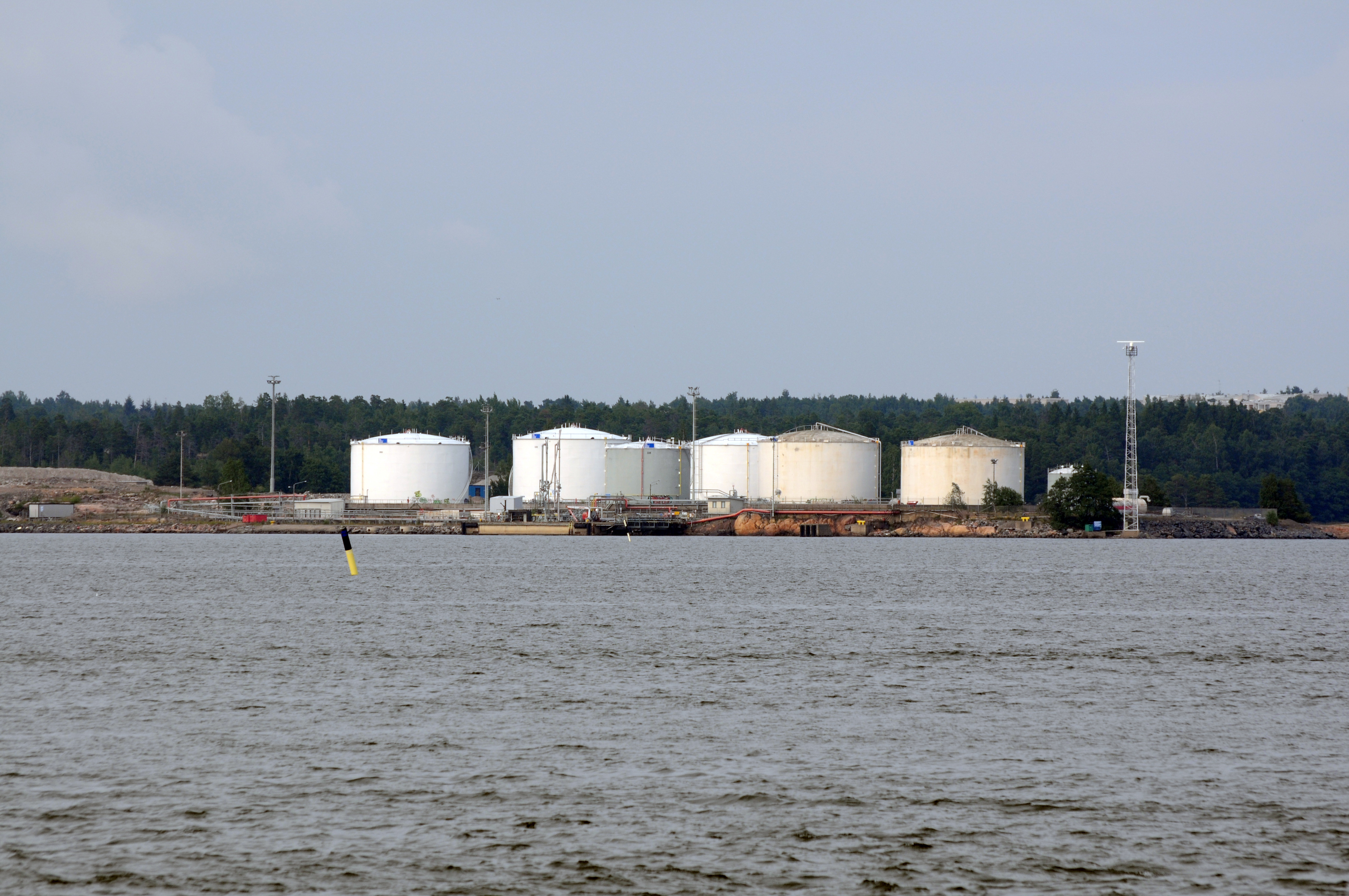
The Laajasalo oil harbour in summer 2011. The oil companies left the area to make way for a new residential area in 2010.

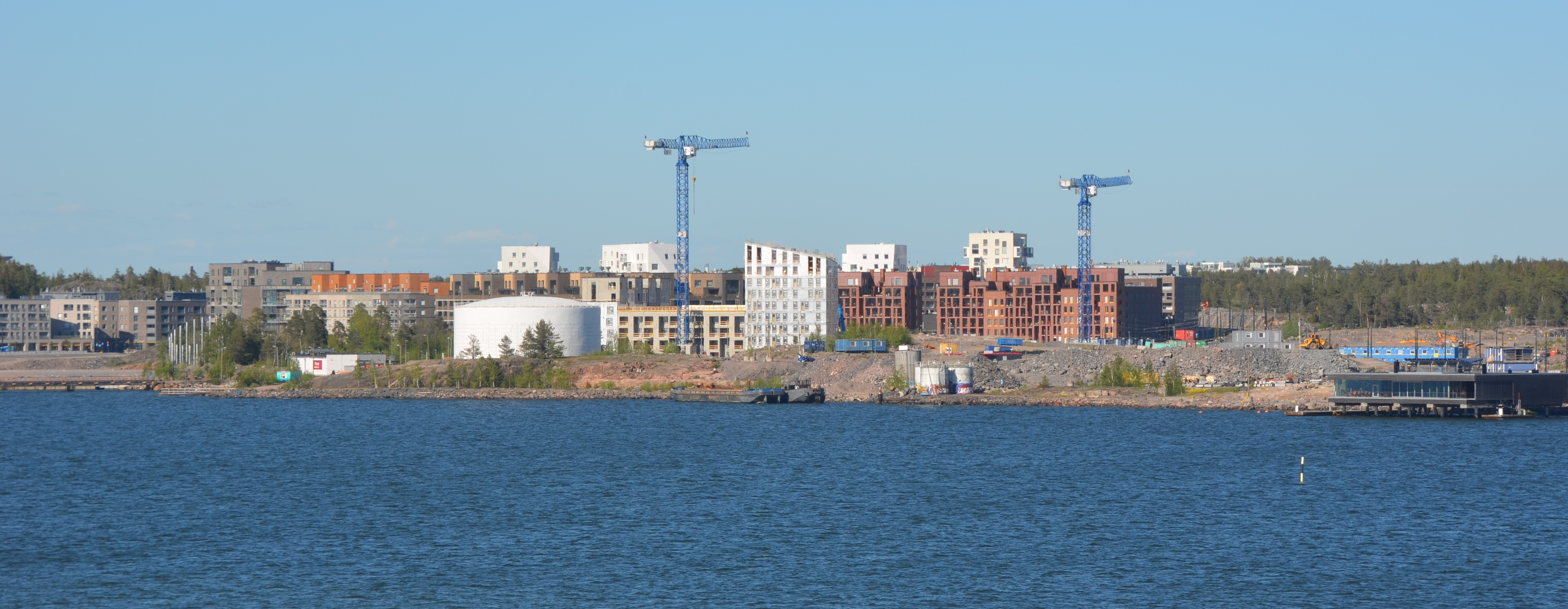
Construction of Kruunuvuorenranta in the place of the old harbour in spring 2025.

The Laajasalo oil harbour was founded in 1951. The first 12 apartment buildings in Laajasalo were built in the northwestern part of the island into Yliskylä in December 1963. These buildings contained a bit more than 700 apartments, which were mostly meant for holders of apartment savings accounts in various banks.

Many apartment buildings were built in the area in the late 1960s and early 1970s. The most intense phase of construction started when the owner of the Uppby manor sold about a hundred hectares of the manor lands to the construction company Wuorio. The main building of the Uppby manor is now known as Ylistalo. The harbour activity ended in 2010 and the new Kruunuvuorenranta residential area was built in its place. Smaller businesses are represented by two boating company concentrations in the Sarvasto boat harbour and in Puuskaniemi.

== Transport ==
The four-lane road Laajasalontie leads from Herttoniemi to Laajasalo, with part of the road converted into an urban boulevard between 2021 and 2022.

Public transport in the area is handled with tram connections to central Helsinki over the Crown Bridges, as well as bus connections to Herttoniemi metro station. In addition, there are night buses to Rautatientori when rail transport does not operate.

== Services and activities ==
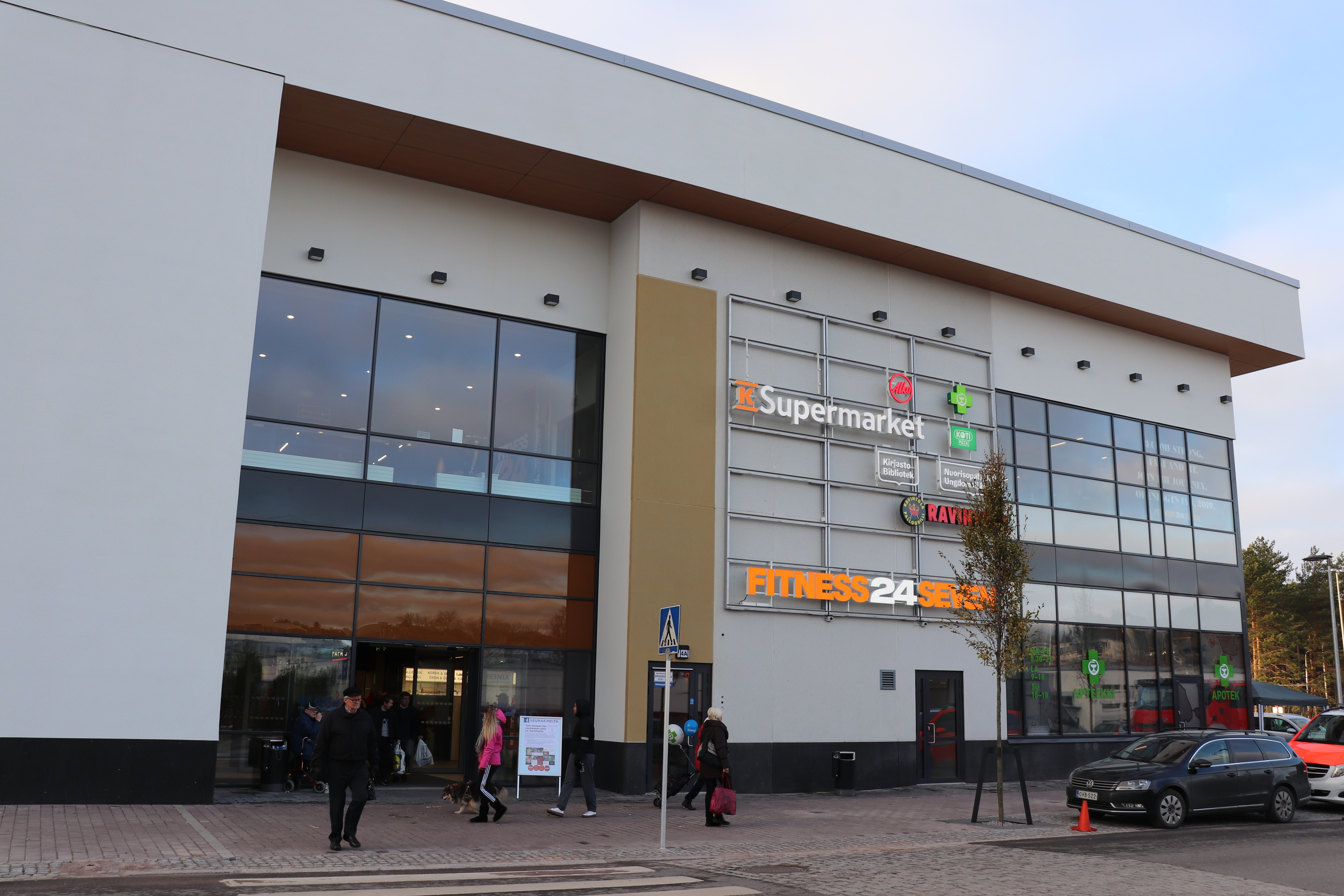
The Saari shopping centre opened in November 2018 replaced the previous shopping centre built in the 1970s.

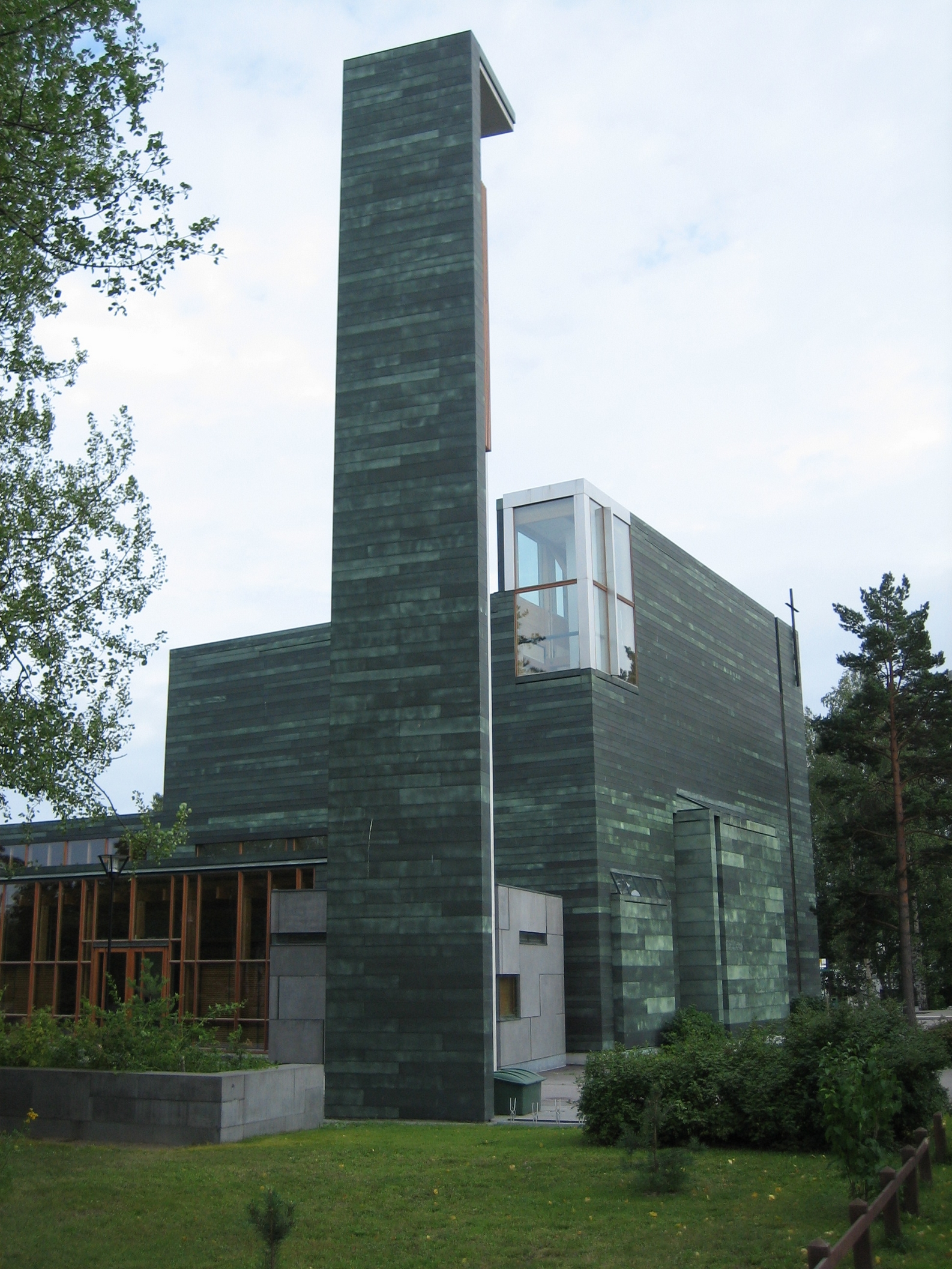
Church in Laajasalo

Most of the commercial services in Laajasalo are concentrated in Yliskylä which also hosts the Laajasalo Church and a healthcare centre. In November 2018 the Saari shopping centre was opened in Yliskylä, with a library in the shopping centre premises.

Laajasalo has two Finnish-language primary schools (the Tahvonlahti school and the Poikkilaakso school) and one common primary school (the Laajasalo school). The major district also includes the Santahamina school. The gymnasium was closed down in 2009 when it was joined with the Etu-Töölö gymnasium. The Swedish-language primary school Degerö lågstadieskola is located in Herttoniemi despite its name, although close to the bridge to Laajasalo. The Helsinki Christian School, the oldest Christian folk high school in Finland, is located in northern Laajasalo.

Laajasalo also hosts the private Snellman academy which trains teachers for Steiner schools and kindergartens. The Snellman academy is located in Jollas and its buildings mostly represent organic architecture. The Snellman academy is the only private higher education institution officially recognised in Finland.
