= Isosaari =

Island in Helsinki, Finland

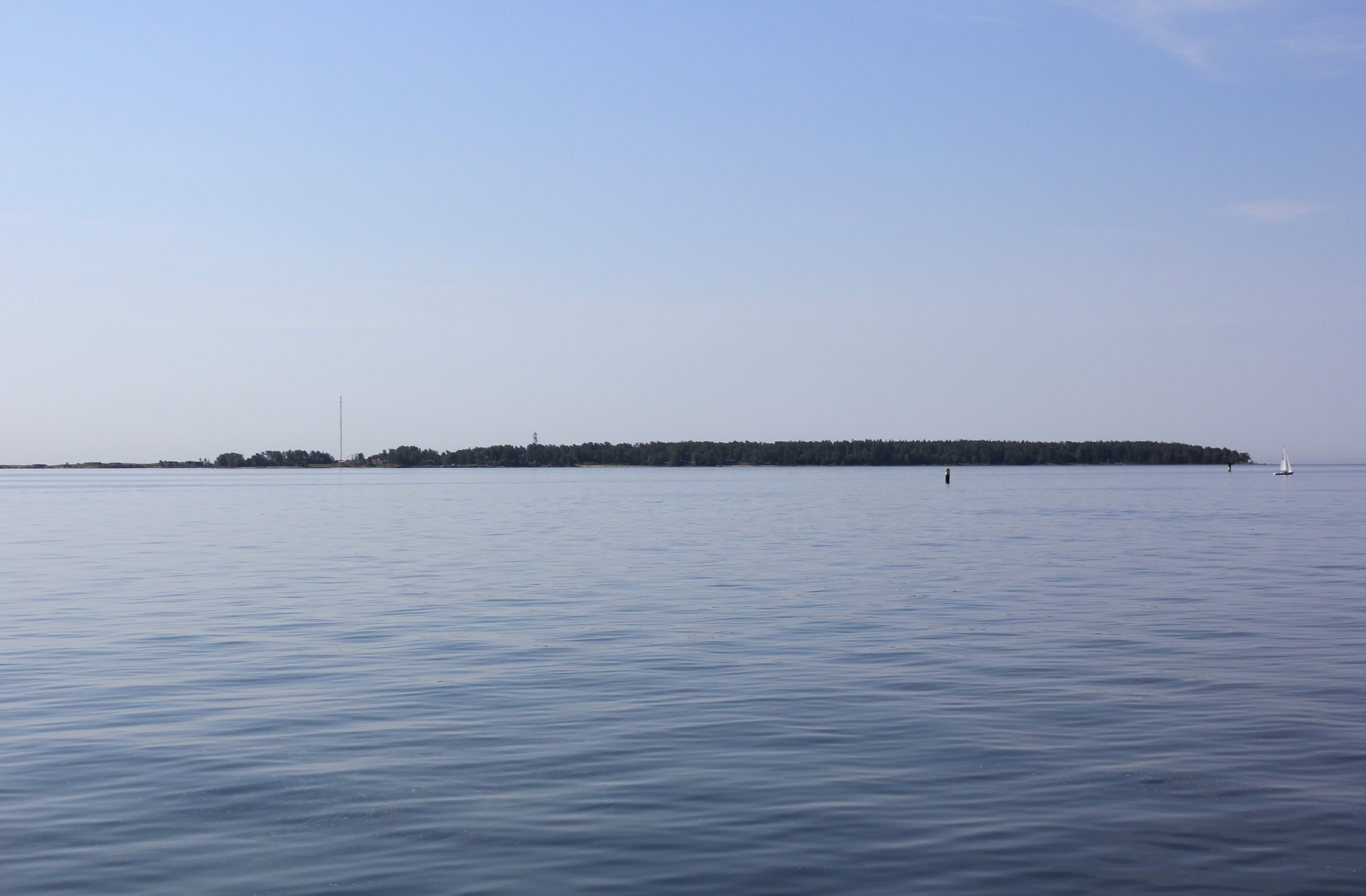
- Isosaari seen from the north.

- Location within Finland

Geography
- Location: Helsinki, Gulf of Finland
- Coordinates: 60.1°N 25.05°E
- Area: 76 ha (190 acres)

Administration
- Finland

Isosaari (Swedish: Mjölö) is an island in Helsinki, part of the Ulkosaaret district of the city, more specifically of Itäsaaret, i.e. ‘eastern islands’. It was one of the fortified islands of the Gulf of Finland. Isosaari is one of the outermost islands in the Helsinki region, and it is a site that is important from the perspective of cultural history. Its sights and its nature are unique.

== General information ==
The island covers an area of 76 hectares. It is mainly covered by a coniferous forest. The island had a fortress of the Finnish Defence Forces until January 2012, when the training of conscripts on the island ceased and the island remained a training ground and a guard fortress.

The island is located 3.8 kilometres to the south of Santahamina. It is two kilometres long and one kilometre wide at its widest. The ferry ride from the Helsinki Market Square takes little over half an hour.

== Naval fortress ==
The island houses a 130 53 TK Coastal artillery battery, a maritime surveillance station and a corrosion laboratory of the Aalto University.

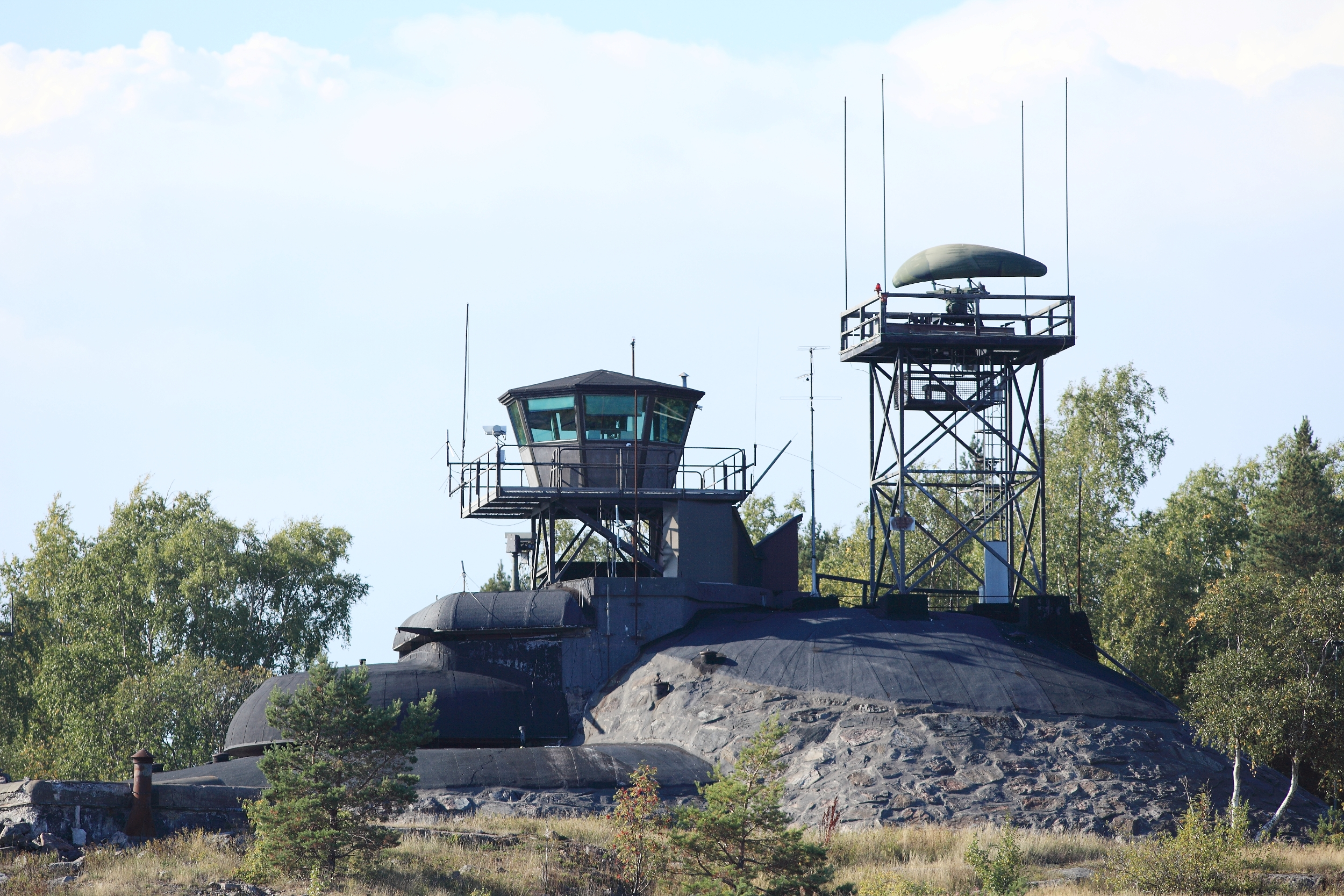
Isosaari maritime surveillance station Rikama, in September 2013

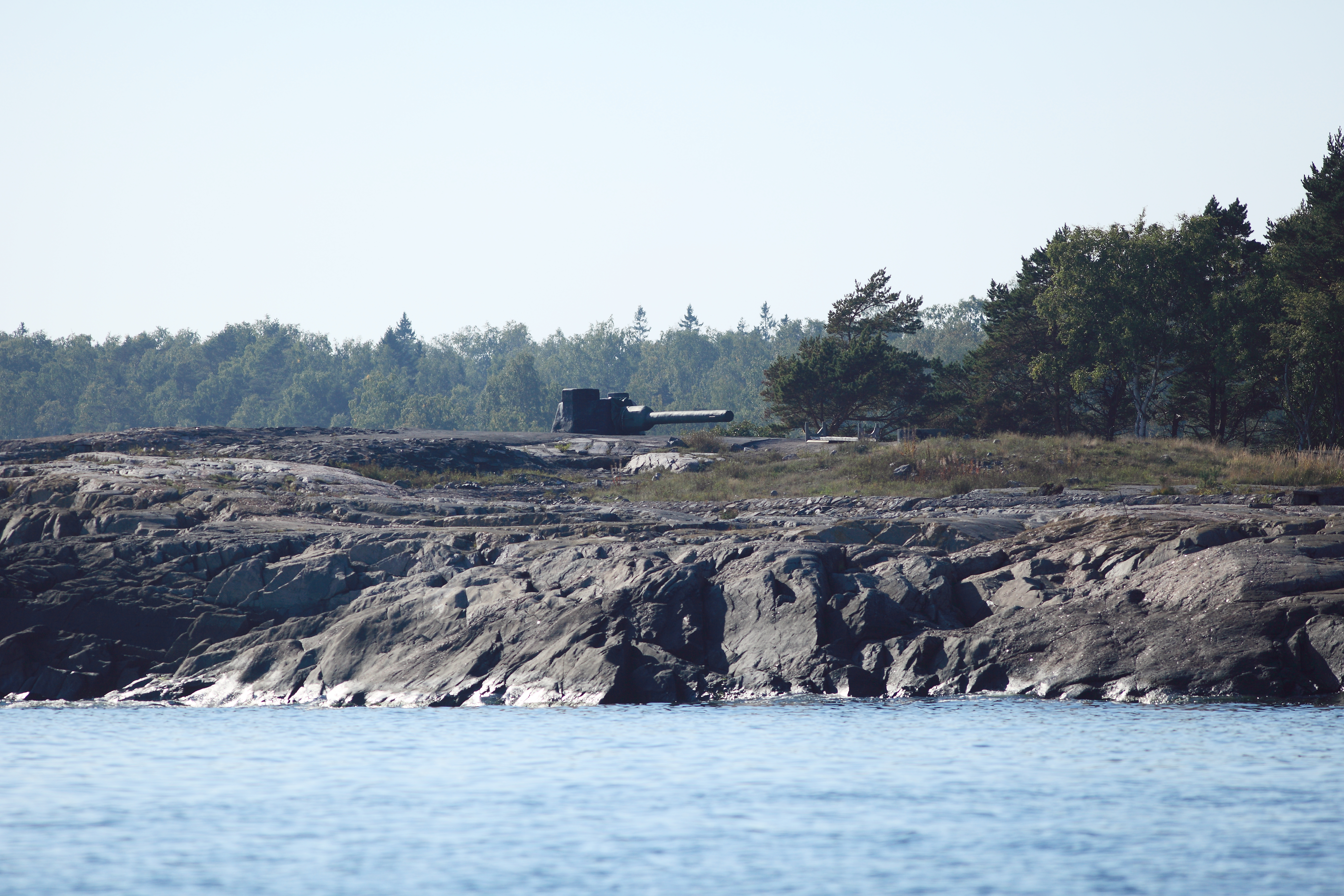
A coastal gun 130 53 TK

The fortification works on Isosaari were begun in 1913. The batteries with heavy guns were completed in 1915. Since then the island fortress played a significant role in the evolution of coastal artillery in Finland and in the defense of capital of the nation. When the training of conscripts ended in Isosaari, it was transferred to the Upinniemi garrison.

During the independence of Finland, the Isosaari fortress was a unit under the Suomenlinna Coastal Regiment, responsible for the training of conscripts and all other functions on the island.

=== Training of conscripts ===
A total of ca. 300 conscripts were trained on the island every year. As of 2012, this training ended, but various special courses are still held on the island. On these courses, firing position men, marines, maritime surveillance men, fortress launchers and military police were trained. In addition to these, firing position NCOs were trained, as well as logistics men, scribes, headquarter couriers and gunsmiths.

The fortress was responsible for its own standby troops, and due to the small number of conscripts, they had fewer weekend leaves than other conscripts in the country, and during the evenings they were not allowed to travel to the mainland. The standby functions included guard duty, maritime surveillance, and the ability to fire warning shots from one of the 130 mm cannons on the island.

In addition to this, the men of the fortress were responsible for guard duty at the Naval Academy on the island of Pikku-Musta in Suomenlinna. The military police of the fortress was responsible for many standby tasks. Marine surveillance based on sensory perception has been discontinued, just as it has on other fortresses in Finland.

The Finnish Defence Forces are responsible for the guarding of the island as well as its logistics and transportation to and from the island. In the old days, boats came to the island from Santahamina three times a day.

== The weather and maritime surveillance station ==
During 1984–2008 the Defence Forces operated a weather station on the island, making observations on behalf of the Finnish Meteorological Institute. The weather observations were made by conscripts, who had been trained in the Artillery Brigade in Niinisalo. Every three hours they sent a SYNOP telegram, which included information on the temperature, the relative humidity, wind speed and direction, quality of clouds and their lower limit and total number, as well as the barometer reading, visibility and meteorological phenomena.

On its 24th anniversary, on 1 October 2008, the Isosaari weather station ceased it operations. Before 1984, the weather station was located on Katajaluoto. There are still automated weather stations on the sea outside Helsinki, e. g. in the Harmaja Lighthouse.

The coastal surveillance station at the southern tip of the island is known as "Rikama", in honour of Colonel Johan Rikama. Actually, Rikama did not have anything to do with the coastal surveillance station, but he was actively involved in the development of the country's coastal defense and especially of the fire control of the coastal artillery. His ashes were scattered to the south of Isosaari, and a stone was erected on its southern shore in his memory. Memorial plaques for him and Lieutenant General Eino Järvinen can be found on the stone. Järvinen died while participating in the inauguration ceremony of the stone.

== The grave of George Quinnell ==
The grave of the English Able seaman George Quinnell is located on Isosaari. He participated in 1855 in what is in Finland known as the Åland War, the British and French naval campaign on the shores of Finland in connection with the Crimean War, as part of the crew of HMS Amphion (1846). The Amphion was trying to sound the Viipuri Channel, but encountered fire from both Santahamina and Samu Matosaari in Laajasalo, as well as from five gun boats. One cannonball from Santahamina hit Quinnell in the head, and took it to the sea. The corpse was identified from the insignia. He was one of the few British casualties in the operation in the Helsinki waters. The body was buried in Isosaari, as the dead could not be transported home without serious health hazards. Quinnell was 35 when he died.

A wooden cross was placed on the grave, with the text: "Sacred to the memory of George Quinnell. I. H. S." Towards the end of the century, a British wife of a Finnish merchant erected a permanent stone on the grave, on to which the text was copied. Representatives of the Royal Navy and the British ambassador to Finland with his spouse have placed a wreath on the grave on the occasions of the 100th and 150th anniversaries of the battle. Tradition says that Quinnell's widow haunts the grave, which has now become a site of interest for tourists.

== Prison camp ==
In 1918, the Isosaari Prison Camp was operated on the island, to which members of the Red Guards and Russian soldiers were placed. It was a place where the Whites placed especially prisoners who were considered to be "politically dangerous". More than 300 prisoners died on the island. Most of the dead were buried in Santahamina, with only a fraction buried in Isosaari. A black stone was erected in 1955 in the memory of those who died on the camp. It is located on the grounds of the former prisoner camp, on the likely site of the mass grave.

== Tourism ==
In 2017, Senate Properties (Finland) rented out the island and its buildings to Suomen Saaristokuljetus so that year-round tourism could be developed on the island. The island was opened to the public in June 2017. It is expected to become a popular destination for visitors and tourists, especially during the summer.

The island has two restaurants, two beaches for swimming, a shooting range, a barracks building, three saunas next to the shore and a number of quarters for the staff. The island also houses a 9-hole "golf course", where the public can play golf. Cruises for golfing are arranged on Mondays. As of 2017, only one person resided regularly on the island. He was born on the island in 1949.
