= Baana =

Rail-trail in Finland

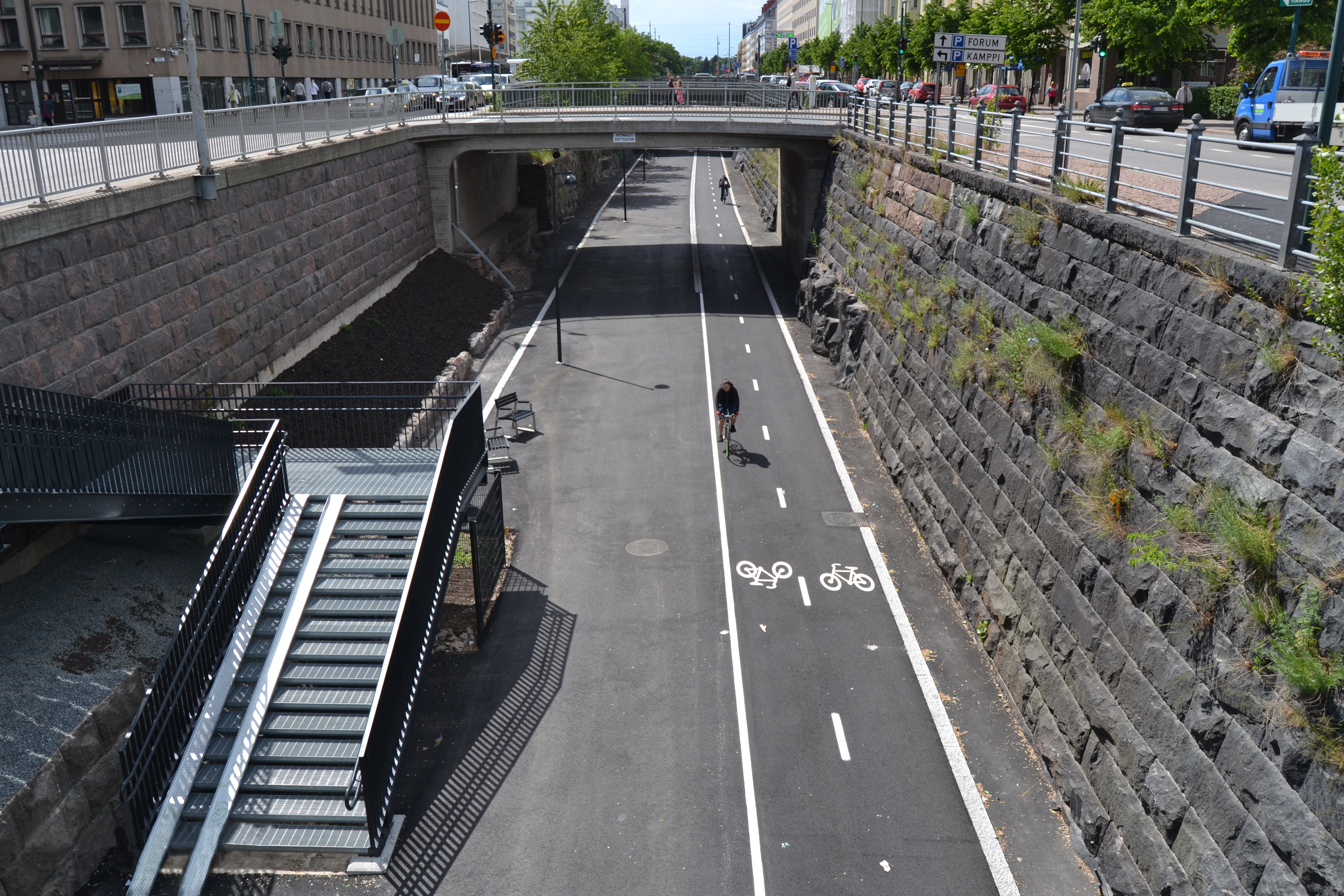
- View of the Baana from Antinkatu bridge in 2012
- Interactive map of Baana
- Type: Rail trail
- Nearest city: Helsinki
- Coordinates: 60°10′21″N 24°56′07″E
- Created: 2012
- Operator: City of Helsinki
- Open: 24h

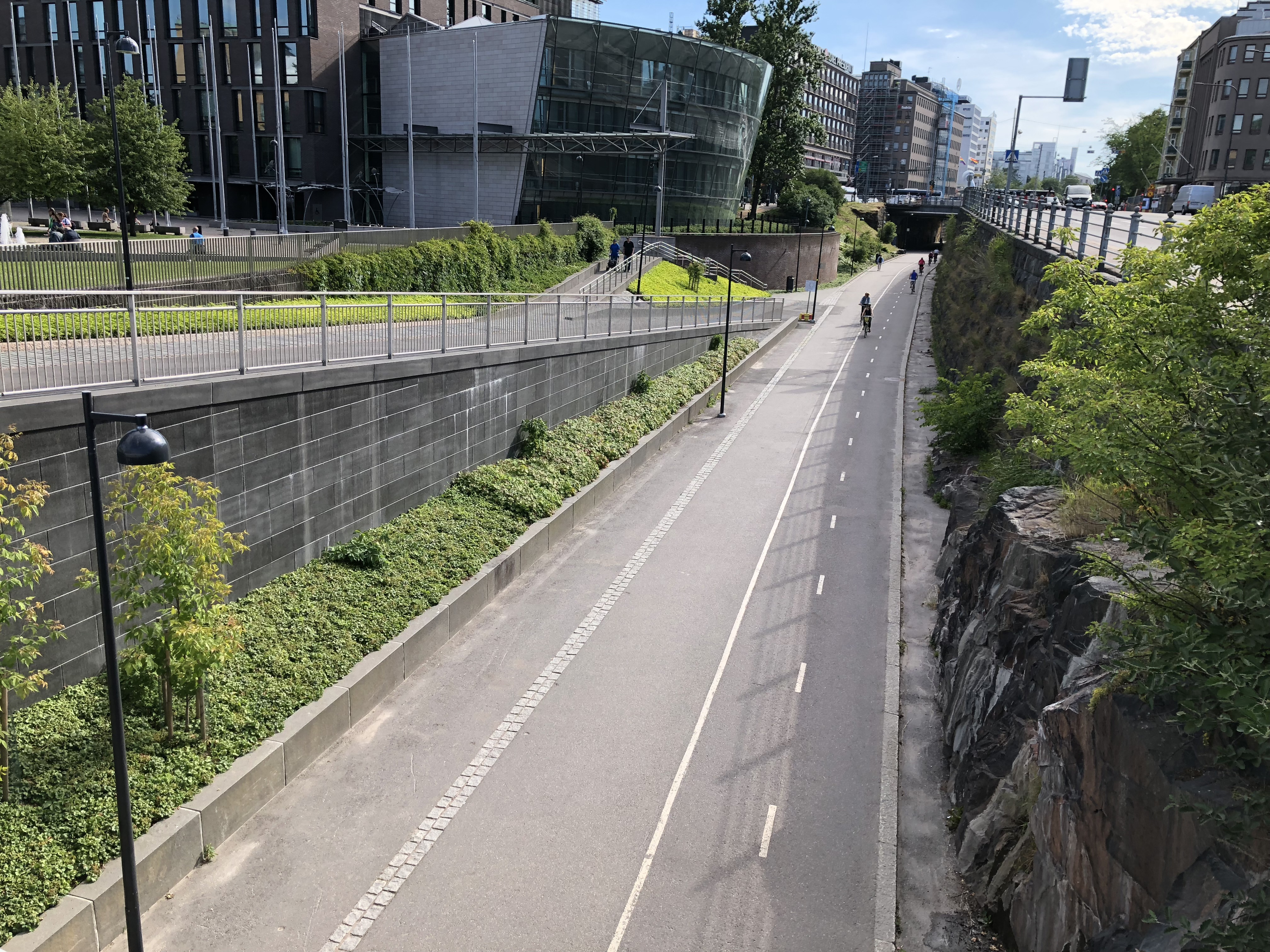
Baana in 2018

Baana is a former railway, which has been transformed into a pedestrian and cycling path as an urban renewal project in Helsinki, replacing the Helsinki harbour railway. Its length is about 1.3 kilometers (0.81 mi), starting from Kiasma. It is used annually by approximately 700 000 cyclists.

== History ==
There were three plans to convert the railway cutting left behind by the disused Helsinki harbour rail to a new use. Of the three plans, the bicycle and pedestrian alternative prevailed in the end. The modification to bike and pedestrian use took several years. The name Baana (Finnish slang word for (rail)way coming from Swedish bana and German Bahn) for the new route was obtained through a naming competition. Baana was opened to the public on Helsinki Day, 12 June 2012.

== Course ==
Baana begins between Helsinki Music Centre and Kiasma. It runs to a new separated-grade vehicle/bicycle junction called Länsilinkki (Western Link) near former level crossing of Hietalahdenranta street with a total length of 1.5 kilometres (0.93 mi) and an average depth of 7 metres (23 ft). There are several sloped exits as well as staircase exits for pedestrians. The pedestrian lane has chairs fixed to asphalt. In the wide part near Ruoholahdenkatu sports-related facilities have been provided for skateboarding and table tennis. Since 2024, Baana's eastern end connects directly to the Kaisantunneli cycling and pedestrian tunnel underneath Helsinki Central Station, and via that to the city's north and eastbound cycling routes.

== Impact ==
Baana provides a speedy way to bike through western Helsinki downtown and adds to non-commercial space in heart of downtown. It has been very popular especially during prime biking season. There is a bike counter which shows bike count for today and for this year. It can also be viewed online. Baana chasm has been used for performances during annual festival Night of the Arts.

Baana received a special mention in European Prize for Urban Public Space competition in 2014.

== Network ==
The name Baana has later been put in more generic use to describe various cycling paths of comparable quality and also Helsinki's cycling network (Baanaverkko) as a whole. As of 2024, none of the new paths connect directly to the original Baana except for the Kaisantunneli underpass, but there are plans such as Mariantunneli and Länsibaana.

New Baanas completed or under construction in Helsinki:

- Pohjoisbaana (north from Pasila)
- Itäbaana (east from Kalasatama)
- Viikinbaana (in Viikki)
- Pasilanbaana (in Pasila)
- Saaristobaana (from Merihaka over Crown Bridges to Laajasalo, Yliskylä and Vartiosaari)
