= Villa Salmela =

Coordinates: 60°09′37.3″N 25°05′42.2″E

Villa Salmela, also known as the Summer home of Karelians, is a villa in the Jollas area of Laajasalo in Helsinki, Finland. It is located in the Villinki Strait opposite the island of Villinki. A summer café is operated in the villa. The villa also has a sauna, which can be used by the public at certain times. The villa is administered by the association Pääsky, which is formed by all the Karelian associations of the Greater Helsinki area.

The villa was built in 1886. At the time, it could be reached by a boat three times a week. The original name of the villa was Villa Bergsund, and its first owner was the Actual State Councillor Jaakko Sjölin (1836–1916), who worked as the general director of the Land Survey of Uusimaa. Altogether the villa has had five owners.

The city of Helsinki bought the villa, and in 1969 it rented it out to the Karelian associations of the Greater Helsinki. This led to the formation of the association Pääsky, the association of Karelian societies in the Greater Helsinki area. In 2006, the association initiated the renovation and development of the villa. Stairs were built to the villa, and a patio café was built.

In 2010, the houses in the area were connected to the water pipe and sewage network of the city, and modern sanitary facilities were built in the villa. The kitchen was renovated, the ovens were rebuilt, and the floors were repaired.
