= Kalli Kalde =

Estonian painter, graphic artist and illustrator

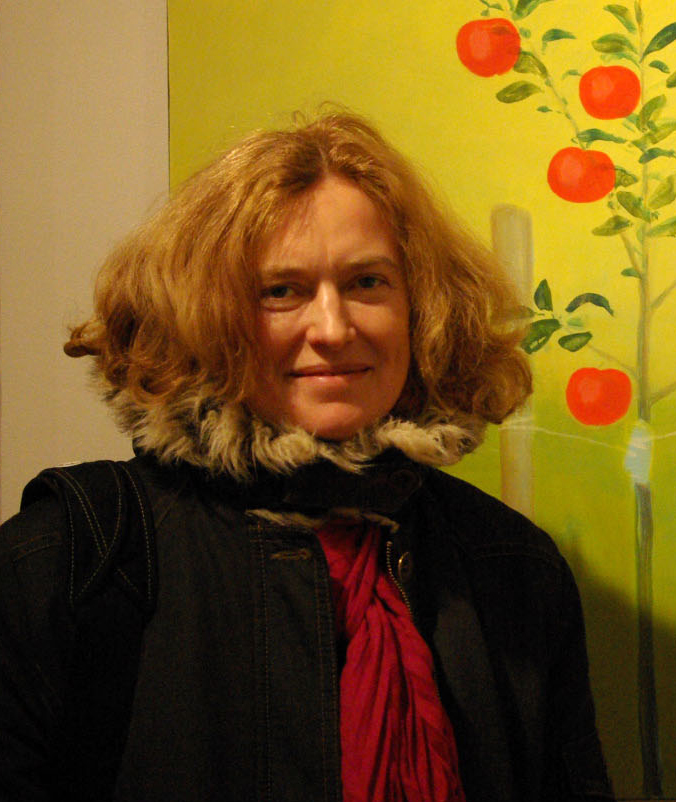
- Born: 6 September 1967 (age 58); Tartu, then part of Estonian SSR, Soviet Union
- Known for: Graphic art, Painting
- Website: kalli.kalde.eu

Kalli Kalde (born 6 September 1967 in Tartu) is an Estonian painter, graphic artist and illustrator.

== Education ==
From 1982 to 1986, Kalde studied graphic design in Tartu Art School. In 1991, she graduated from Department of Drawing and Manual Training in Tallinn University.

== Career ==
Kalde has taken part in expositions since 1988.

Kalde has been a member of the Tartu Artists' Association since 1995 and a member of the Association of Estonian Printmakers (Estonian: Eesti Vabagraafikute Ühendus) since 2013.

== Artworks ==
- 1998–99 — Ceiling and wall paintings in Villa Ammende in Pärnu
- 2000 — Ceiling paintings in Villa Salmela in Finland
- 2005 — Illustrations for the book Two Suns by Jaan Kaplinski
- 2005 — Ceiling and wall paintings for the Konuvere manor in Pärnumaa
- 2005, 2006 — Illustrations for the magazine Täheke
- 2006 — Photos and layout for the book Silence into Colours by Jaan Kaplinski
- 2006 — Illustrations for the book Northwind and Southwind by Jaan Kaplinski
- 2007 — Illustrations for the book Evening is Appletree by Jaan Kaplinski
- 2008 — Photos and layout for the book Another Side of Lake by Jaan Kaplinski
- 2009 — Illustrations and layout for the book Bygoners by Jaan Kaplinski
- 2011 — Illustrations for the book Fairytales of Love by Epp Petrone
- 2011 — Illustrations for the book My Especial Child
