= List of municipalities of Finland in which Finnish is not the sole official language =

Officially monolingual Finnish-speaking municipalities Bilingual municipalities with Finnish as the majority language Bilingual municipalities with Swedish as the majority language Monolingual Swedish-speaking municipalities (Åland) Sami bilingual municipalities

There are 53 municipalities of Finland in which Finnish is not the sole official language. In Finland, as of December 31, 2013, 89.3% of the population speak Finnish, 5.3% Swedish and 0.04% Sami languages. Both Finnish and Swedish are official languages of Finland. Officially, a municipality is bilingual if the minority language group consists of at least 8% of the population, or at least 3,000 speakers. A previously bilingual municipality remains so if the linguistic minority proportion drops below 8%, up to 6%. If it drops below 6%, it is possible for the municipality to remain bilingual by government decree, on the recommendation of the municipal council, for a further ten years. Municipalities that make use of the 3,000-speaker rule include the national capital Helsinki and the cultural center of Swedish Finns, Turku. On the Åland archipelago, where Finnish is almost absent from daily life, the language law does not apply. On the mainland, the highest proportion of Swedish-speakers is found on the western coast, in Ostrobothnia.

Of the 310 Finnish municipalities, 16 are monolingually Swedish. 33 municipalities are bilingually Finnish and Swedish; of these, 15 have a Swedish-speaking majority and 18 a Finnish-speaking one. Four municipalities, all located in Lapland, have a Finnish-speaking majority and a Sami-speaking minority: Enontekiö, Inari, Sodankylä and Utsjoki. Initially, only Swedish was accorded official bilingualism, through a language act of 1922; similar provisions were extended to Sami through a 1991 law. The 1922 law was replaced by new but largely similar legislation in 2003.

== Municipalities ==
Name in majority language	Name in minority language(s)	Language(s)	Percentage of population speaking official language other than Finnish 31 December 2025	Region
Brändö	—N/a	Monolingually Swedish	72.6	Åland
Eckerö	—N/a	Monolingually Swedish	85.7	Åland
Enontekiö	Northern Sami: Eanodat; Swedish: Enontekis	Finnish majority, Sami minority	10.2	Lapland
Espoo	Esbo	Finnish majority, Swedish minority	6.2	Uusimaa
Finström	—N/a	Monolingually Swedish	88.7	Åland
Föglö	—N/a	Monolingually Swedish	79.7	Åland
Geta	—N/a	Monolingually Swedish	81.6	Åland
Hammarland	—N/a	Monolingually Swedish	89.7	Åland
Hanko	Hangö	Finnish majority, Swedish minority	41.2	Uusimaa
Helsinki	Helsingfors	Finnish majority, Swedish minority	5.4	Uusimaa
Inari	Inari Sami: Aanaar; Skolt Sami: Aanar; Northern Sami: Anár; Swedish: Enare	Finnish majority, Sami minority	7.1	Lapland
Ingå	Inkoo	Swedish majority, Finnish minority	50.8	Uusimaa
Jakobstad	Pietarsaari	Swedish majority, Finnish minority	53.1	Ostrobothnia
Jomala	—N/a	Monolingually Swedish	87.2	Åland
Kaskinen	Kaskö	Finnish majority, Swedish minority	27.0	Ostrobothnia
Kauniainen	Grankulla	Finnish majority, Swedish minority	30.2	Uusimaa
Kimitoön	Kemiönsaari	Swedish majority, Finnish minority	65.3	Southwest Finland
Kirkkonummi	Kyrkslätt	Finnish majority, Swedish minority	14.4	Uusimaa
Kokkola	Karleby	Finnish majority, Swedish minority	11.7	Central Ostrobothnia
Korsholm	Mustasaari	Swedish majority, Finnish minority	67.9	Ostrobothnia
Korsnäs	—N/a	Swedish majority, Finnish minority	83.0	Ostrobothnia
Kristinestad	Kristiinankaupunki	Swedish majority, Finnish minority	51.9	Ostrobothnia
Kronoby	Kruunupyy	Swedish majority, Finnish minority	75.4	Ostrobothnia
Kumlinge	—N/a	Monolingually Swedish	90.3	Åland
Kökar	—N/a	Monolingually Swedish	88.4	Åland
Lapinjärvi	Lappträsk	Finnish majority, Swedish minority	28.6	Uusimaa
Larsmo	Luoto	Swedish majority, Finnish minority	91.6	Ostrobothnia
Lemland	—N/a	Monolingually Swedish	90.6	Åland
Lohja	Lojo	Finnish majority, Swedish minority	3.4	Uusimaa
Loviisa	Lovisa	Finnish majority, Swedish minority	38.7	Uusimaa
Lumparland	—N/a	Monolingually Swedish	85.2	Åland
Malax	Maalahti	Swedish majority, Finnish minority	84.4	Ostrobothnia
Mariehamn	Maarianhamina	Monolingually Swedish	85.7	Åland
Myrskylä	Mörskom	Finnish majority, Swedish minority	9.2	Uusimaa
Nykarleby	Uusikaarlepyy	Swedish majority, Finnish minority	83.7	Ostrobothnia
Närpes	Närpiö	Swedish majority, Finnish minority	72.6	Ostrobothnia
Pargas	Parainen	Swedish majority, Finnish minority	53.5	Southwest Finland
Pedersöre	Pedersören kunta	Swedish majority, Finnish minority	88.4	Ostrobothnia
Porvoo	Borgå	Finnish majority, Swedish minority	27.2	Uusimaa
Pyhtää	Pyttis	Finnish majority, Swedish minority	6.5	Kymenlaakso
Raseborg	Raasepori	Swedish majority, Finnish minority	63.3	Uusimaa
Saltvik	—N/a	Monolingually Swedish	88.8	Åland
Sipoo	Sibbo	Finnish majority, Swedish minority	26.8	Uusimaa
Siuntio	Sjundeå	Finnish majority, Swedish minority	26.0	Uusimaa
Sodankylä	Northern Sami: Soađegilli; Inari Sami: Suáđigil; Skolt Sami: Suäʹđjel	Finnish majority, Sami minority	1.6	Lapland
Sottunga	—N/a	Monolingually Swedish	96.9	Åland
Sund	—N/a	Monolingually Swedish	87.9	Åland
Turku	Åbo	Finnish majority, Swedish minority	5.4	Southwest Finland
Utsjoki	Northern Sami: Ohcejohka; Inari Sami: Uccjuuhâ; Skolt Sami: Uccjokk	Finnish majority, Sami minority	41.4	Lapland
Vaasa	Vasa	Finnish majority, Swedish minority	22.8	Ostrobothnia
Vantaa	Vanda	Finnish majority, Swedish minority	2.1	Uusimaa
Vårdö	—N/a	Monolingually Swedish	84.9	Åland
Vörå	Vöyri	Swedish majority, Finnish minority	81.3	Ostrobothnia

== See also ==
- Languages of Finland
- Swedish-speaking Finns
- List of Finnish municipalities
- Names of places in Finland in Finnish and in Swedish
