= Kaisantunneli =

Cycling tunnel across the central station in Helsinki, Finland

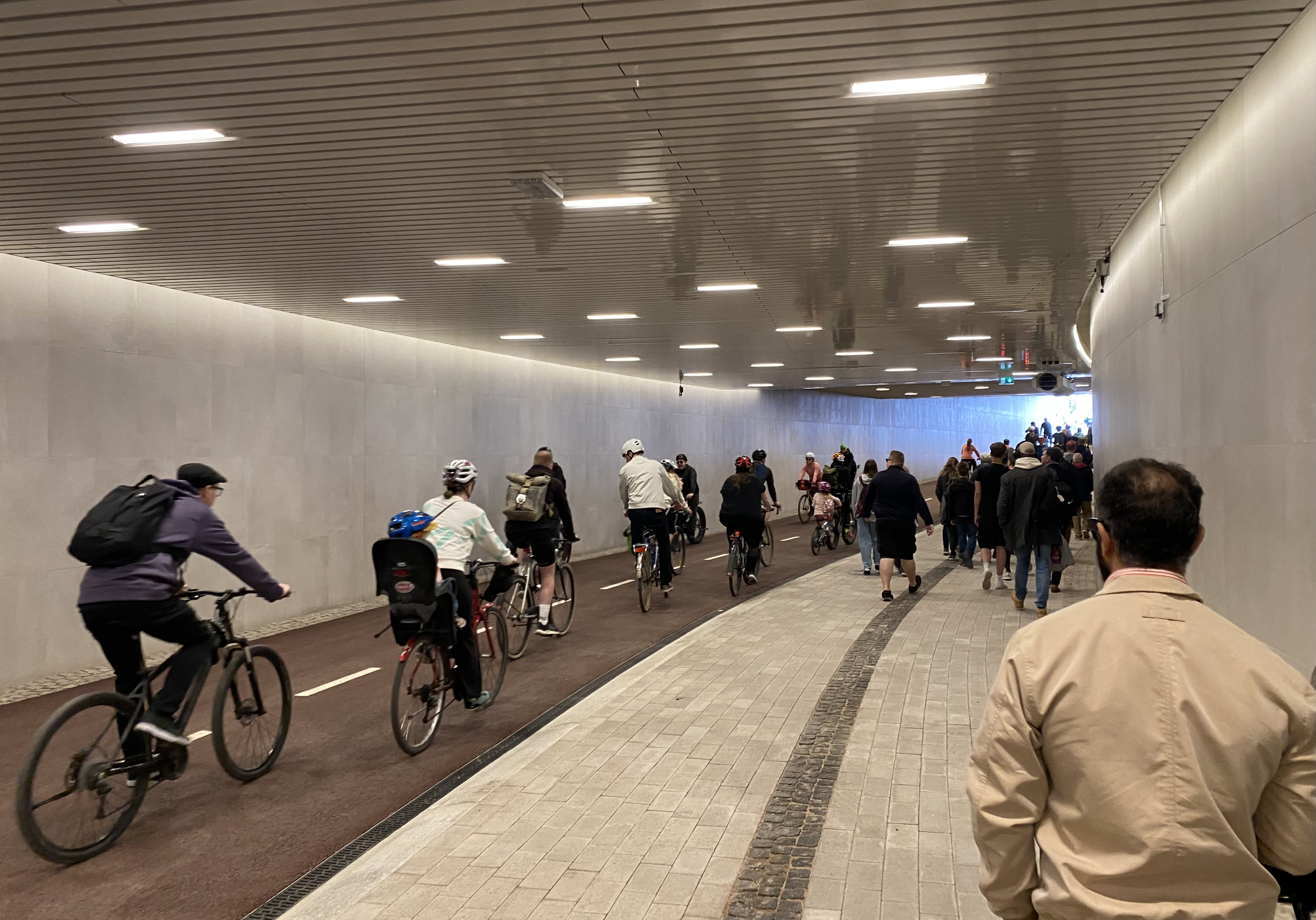
- Interactive map of Kaisantunneli

Overview
- Location: Under Helsinki Central Station, Finland
- Coordinates: 60.1733°N 24.9411°E
- Start: Baana (western end)
- End: Kaisaniemi Park (eastern end)

Operation
- Work began: April 2021
- Opened: May 2024
- Traffic: Cycling, pedestrian

Technical
- Length: 220 metres (720 ft)
- Tunnel clearance: 3 metres (9.8 ft)
- Width: 8 metres (26 ft)

Kaisantunneli (Swedish: Kajsatunneln) is a tunnel for bicycle and pedestrian use in central Helsinki, Finland, serving as the main east–west cycling thoroughfare in the city centre.

The tunnel is located directly underneath the Central Station, and joins the city's eastern and western cycling routes, cutting previous travel distance around the station by up to 600 metres (2,000 ft) and avoiding several sets of traffic lights, as well as removing much of the cycle traffic from the busy Kaivokatu street. Its western end connects directly to the Baana cycle path.

The width of the tunnel is split roughly 50:50 between pedestrian and cycling lanes. The tunnel allows direct access to the station platforms, and connects with the separate pedestrian-only tunnel under the station. Additional cycle park for 900 bikes, as well as bike servicing facilities, will be opened in the tunnel later.

Construction of the tunnel began in spring 2021 and was expected to be complete in autumn 2023, but in the end the tunnel opened to the public on 4 May 2024. The construction was especially challenging, on account of some old masonry and timber support structures underpinning the station, which were only discovered after construction had already begun. The construction cost c. EUR 33m, with the final figure exceeding the budget by some EUR 10m.

The tunnel is expected to be used by up to 10,000 cyclists daily.
