= Toponyms of Finland =

The toponyms of Finland result mainly from the legacy left by three linguistic heritages: the Finnish language (spoken as first language by about 93% of the population), the Swedish language (about 5.5%) and Sami languages (about 0.03%). Finland’s place names range from those of unknown or unrecognizable origins to more clearly derivable onomastics. There are both national and international recommendations on how to use the bilingual country's place names in texts written in different languages. In Finland, the Research Institute for the Languages of Finland and the National Land Survey of Finland are jointly responsible for the standardization of place names.

== Historical aspects ==
A few notable place names such as a few major hydronyms Päijänne, Saimaa, Imatra and Keitele which are thought to be among the oldest toponyms still lack a sound derivation from existing languages despite different approaches. This has led to the postulation that they may originate from an unknown language. A substratum of archaic Sami place names, often fennicized in the course of time, can be found throughout the country. The majority of Finland’s toponyms can be recognized having archaic or dialectal Finnish origins. A Finnish substratum can be deduced in Swedish place names and vice versa in many cases.

Major urbanisation started, and city rights were granted in Finland when the country was part of Sweden, and Swedish was the de facto only official language though the majority always spoke Finnish dialects as a first language. Therefore, in older foreign writing, many municipal and city names are given only in their Swedish form. In some coastal regions, place names are only in Swedish since the areas have been mainly Swedish-speaking for several centuries. Other substrata in Finland’s toponyms include Finnic, Baltic, Germanic and Slavic linguistic influence in several chronological layers.

== Jurisdiction regarding languages in Finland ==
Finland, except for Åland, has two official languages: Finnish and Swedish. The Åland islands have a single official language: Swedish. On the mainland, Swedish-speakers are concentrated to the regions Ostrobothnia, Uusimaa and around Turku. North Sami, Inari Sami and Skolt Sami are semi-official in the Sami Domicile Area. The Language Act of 2003 groups municipalities into three groups: monolingually Finnish, monolingually Swedish and bilingual. The municipality is monolingual, if it has less than 8% of the minority language speakers and if the population of the lingual minority in the municipality is below 3,000. Other communities are bilingual.

In bilingual municipalities, the Language Act requires that all toponyms have both a Finnish and a Swedish name. In addition, many monolingually Finnish municipalities have an official Swedish name, and vice versa. The municipalities have the power to decide their own name but they are required to consult with the Research Institute for the Languages of Finland before the official decision.

== Conventions ==
These are the current conventions recommended by the Research Institute for the Languages of Finland. The conventions have also been adopted by the United Nations Group of Experts on Geographical Names:

- Finnish place names are used in the Finnic languages (such as Finnish and Estonian). Swedish place names are used in the North Germanic languages (such as Swedish and Norwegian). Sami place names are used in the different Sami languages around northern Fennoscandia.
- In other languages, if that language doesn’t already have an established toponym for the place (very seldom), the choice between Finnish and Swedish toponyms is based on the demographic situation. Finnish place names are used when handling a municipality where Finnish is the majority language (90% of all municipalities, 93% of the cities). Swedish place naming is used when handling a municipality where Swedish is the majority language. Concerning the Sami Homeland, toponyms are written in Finnish and appended with the Sami place names.

The convention concerning street names and traffic signs maintains that the majority language toponym is presented topmost and place names in the minority languages are listed below.

=== Possible deviations in the conventions ===
A few exonyms (in Medieval or Neo-Latin, not in use in Finland or Sweden) exist for Finland’s provincial structures. These include the names of the nine historical provinces (Fi: maakunta, Sw: landskap) that have given names to some of Finland’s current regions (Fi: maakunta, Sw: landskap, altogether 20 as of 1997). These may fall under the category of "already established place names in foreign languages" mentioned in the above recommendations.

The names of the nine historical provinces in Finnish, Swedish and English :

1. Varsinais-Suomi fi; Egentliga Finland sv; Finland Proper en
2. Uusimaa fi, en; Nyland sv
3. Satakunta fi, sv, en
4. Häme fi; Tavastland sv; Tavastia en
5. Savo fi, en; Savolax sv
6. Karjala fi; Karelen sv; Karelia en
7. Pohjanmaa fi; Österbotten sv; Ostrobothnia en
8. Lappi fi; Lappland sv; Lapland en
9. Åland sv, en; Ahvenanmaa fi

=== Guidelines for naming new places ===
In urban planning, new names are needed for different places. Suburbs, streets, parks and other areas must be named. In bilingual municipalities, the task is complicated by the need to use two different languages in the toponyms. As all municipalities in the Finnish capital region, which is the most swiftly developing area in Finland, are bilingual, the problem of devising good toponyms is not a small task.

The Research Institute for the Languages of Finland has given guidelines for devising new toponyms. The basic principle is to use toponyms already in use and spell them according to the modern language norms. As the old toponym for a minor place, such as a field, often exist only in one language, they should be translated with care. Only such names which carry an identifiable meaning should be translated directly. If the toponym already exists in both languages, the existing forms should be used. If the translation of the name is unfeasible and there exists no toponym in the other language, then the toponym should be loaned in its original form. Personal names should not be translated. However, if the existing name is unusable in the other language for phonetic or grammatical reasons, a new name may be freely invented.

The cases where two municipalities are fused together, create a special case for the construction of toponyms. There are two simple cases for the name selection:

- smaller municipalities joining a city: the name of the city should be used
- municipalities which have been chapel parishes joining the municipality which has been the mother parish: the name of the historical mother parish should be used.

In other cases, the toponym should be selected from the historical toponyms of the area. In many cases, there are historical administrative structures that have encompassed the area of the merging municipalities. If such names are unusable, the name of some the most prominent villages in the area should be used. To reduce the possibility of confusion, the new name should not include the name of the province or the region. In no case should the name be made up of two parts, because the use of such name is grammatically difficult in Finnish language. The names of the merger projects or frivolous names should also be avoided at all costs.

If the merging municipalities will form a bilingual municipality, the Finnish name chosen for the municipality should be such that a Swedish counterpart can be found without difficulty. The Swedish name of the new municipality should be devised according to the same principles as in other toponymical planning.

=== Finnish grammar ===
In Finnish grammar, some toponyms receive external locative suffixes, especially those named for bodies of water, as in (river and town Seinäjoki) Seinäjoella (either on river Seinäjoki or in town Seinäjoki. Case of being in or under the river being Seinäjoessa). The rest receive internal locative suffixes, as in Helsingissä (being inflected form of the town, meaning: in Helsinki).

== Literature ==
- Skärgårdsnamn (1989), Zilliacus, Kurt, published by Society of Swedish Literature in Finland

== See also ==
- Names of places in Finland in Finnish and in Swedish
