= Hiidenkivi =

Cultural magazine in Helsinki, Finland (1994–2012)

- Editor-in-chief: Outi Lauhakangas
- Categories: Cultural magazine
- Frequency: Bimonthly
- Founder: Elina Grundström
- Founded: 1994
- First issue: 28 January 1994
- Final issue: December 2012
- Country: Finland
- Based in: Helsinki
- Language: Finnish
- ISSN: 1236-794X
- OCLC: 30923296

Hiidenkivi was a magazine which featured articles on culture, history, language and literature. The magazine existed between 1994 and 2012 and was headquartered in Helsinki, Finland.

== History and profile ==
Hiidenkivi was founded by Elina Grundström in 1994. The first issue appeared on 28 January that year. Grundström was given the Finnish State Award for Public Information for her founding of the magazine in 1995. Hiidenkivi was affiliated with the Institute for the Languages of Finland. In fact, the institute was its publisher with other organizations. In 2010 the magazine started its website.

From January 2009 to December 2012 the editor-in-chief of Hiidenkivi was Outi Lauhakangas. The magazine ceased publication in December 2012.
