= Institute for the Languages of Finland =

Linguistic research institute sponsored by the Finnish government

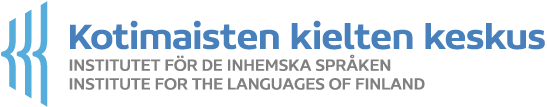
- Abbreviation: Kotus
- Formerly called: Research Institute for the Languages of Finland
- Established: 1 March 1976 (50 years ago)
- Headquarters: Hakaniemi
- Coordinates: 60°10′43″N 24°57′18″E
- Parent organisations: Ministry of Education and Culture
- Employees: 67 (2024)
- Website: en.kotus.fi

The Institute for the Languages of Finland, (Note: Finnish: Kotimaisten kielten keskus, from which the shortened name Kotus is derived, Inari Sami: Päikkieennâm kielâi tutkâmkuávdáš, Northern Sami: Ruovttueatnan gielaid guovddáš, Skolt Sami: Dommjânnmlaž ǩiõli kõõskõs, Kalo Finnish Romani: Finnosko tšimbengo instituutos, Swedish: Institutet för de inhemska språken) better known as Kotus, is a governmental linguistic research institute of Finland geared to studies of Finnish, Swedish (cf. Finland Swedish), the Sami languages, Romani language, as well as Finnish Sign Language and Finland-Swedish Sign Language.

The institute is charged with the standardization of languages used in Finland. It is the foremost authority on Finnish language planning and its recommendations are considered to define the standard Finnish which is used in official communication. In addition to these tasks, the Institute also has an important consulting function in the shaping of Finnish language policy and choosing toponyms. On the other hand, in the Swedish language, the institute usually promotes Swedish usage, with the key aim to prevent the Swedish spoken in Finland from straying too far from its counterpart in Sweden.

The institute has published various magazines, including Kielikello and Språkbruk. In collaboration with other organizations it also published a cultural magazine entitled Hiidenkivi until 2012.

The Institute has a non-binding recommendation that Norway, Denmark, and Iceland also use the Swedish names for Finnish locations, for instance Helsingfors for Helsinki, and which is accepted by the Language Council of Norway. While this is mostly adhered to by Norwegian organisations, Helsinki remains in some use in media and travel guides, while Lahtis for Lahti is almost entirely disregarded.
