= Tullisaari =

Coordinates: 60°11′N 25°02′E

Tullisaari (in Finnish) Turholm (in Swedish)
- Neighborhood of Helsinki
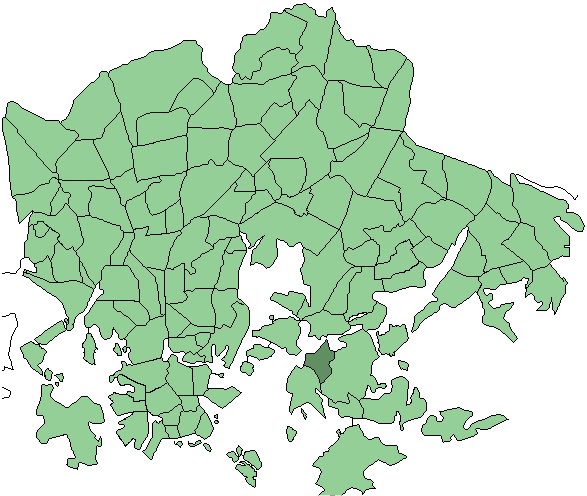
- Location in Helsinki
- Country: Finland
- Province: Southern Finland
- Region: Uusimaa
- Sub-region: Helsinki
- Time zone: UTC+2 (EET)
  - Summer (DST): UTC+3 (EEST)

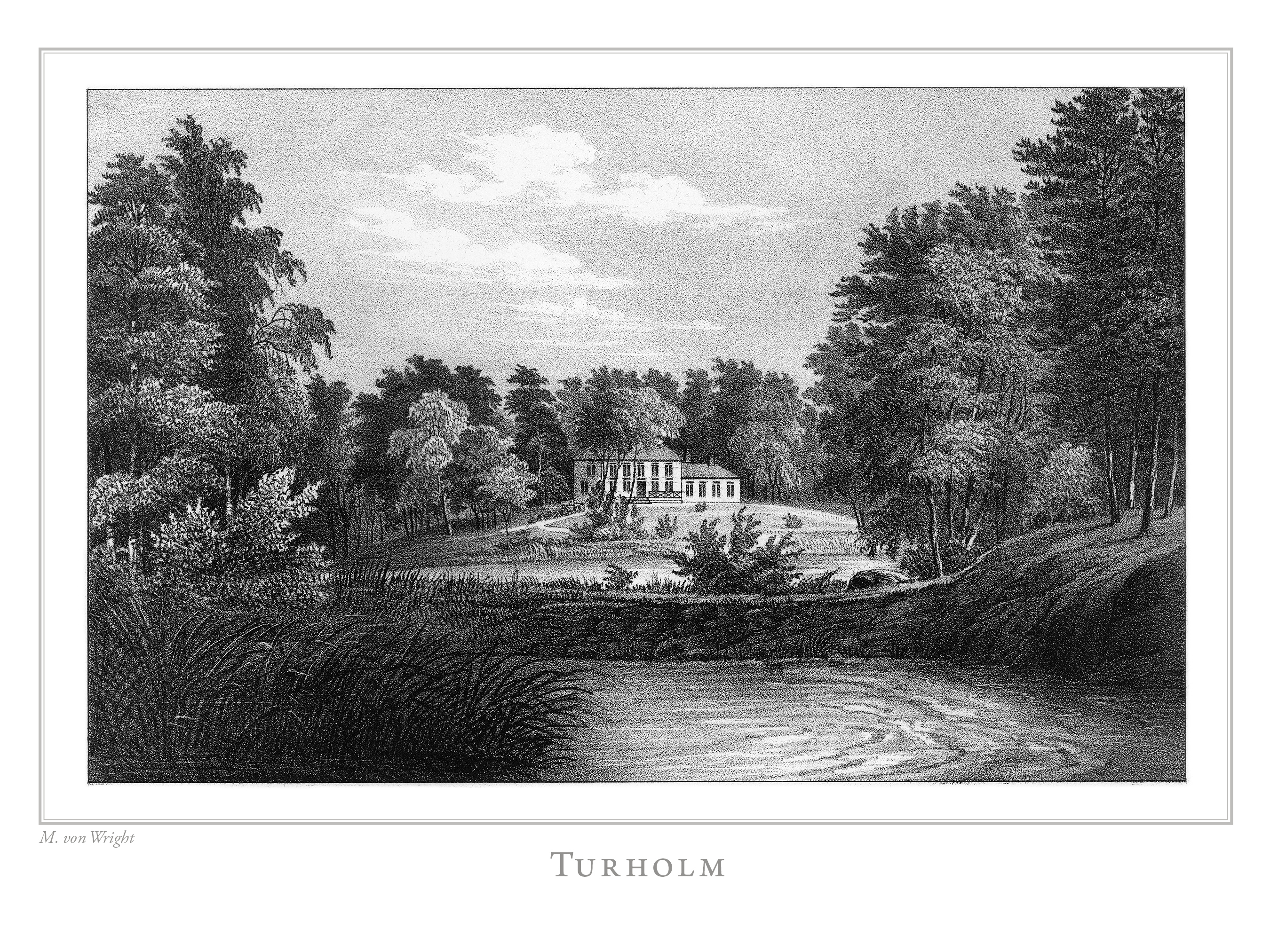
Illustration in Finland framstäldt i teckningar edited by Zacharias Topelius and published 1845-1852.

Tullisaari (Finnish), Turholm (Swedish) is a southeastern neighborhood of Helsinki, Finland.
