= Ulkosaaret =

Ulkosaaret (in Finnish) Utöarna (in Swedish)
- Subdistrict of Helsinki
- Location in Helsinki
- Country: Finland
- Province: Southern Finland
- Region: Uusimaa
- Sub-region: Helsinki
- Time zone: UTC+2 (EET)
  - Summer (DST): UTC+3 (EEST)

Ulkosaaret (Swedish: Utöarna) is a subdistrict of Helsinki, Finland. It consists of the mostly-seawater based boroughs or neighborhiods of Itäsaaret and Aluemeri.
