= Yliskylä =

Yliskylä (in Finnish) Uppby (in Swedish)
- Neighborhood of Helsinki
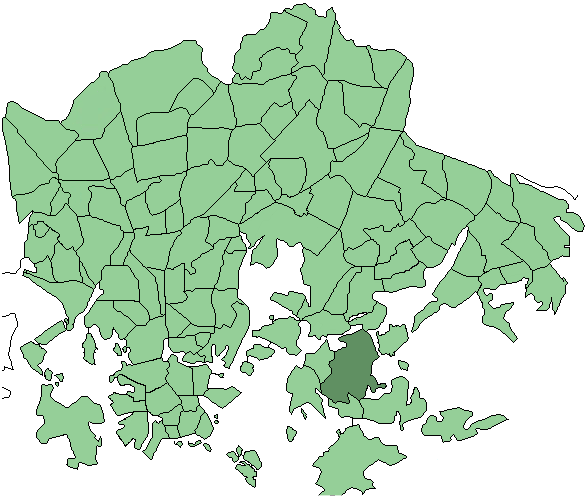
- Location in Helsinki
- Coordinates: 60.18055°N 25.05475°E
- Country: Finland
- Province: Southern Finland
- Region: Uusimaa
- Sub-region: Helsinki
- Time zone: UTC+2 (EET)
  - Summer (DST): UTC+3 (EEST)

Yliskylä (Finnish), Uppby (Swedish), is a southeastern neighborhood of Helsinki, Finland, situated on the island of Laajasalo.
