= Hevossalmi =

Hevossalmi (in Finnish) Hästnässund (in Swedish)
- Neighborhood of Helsinki
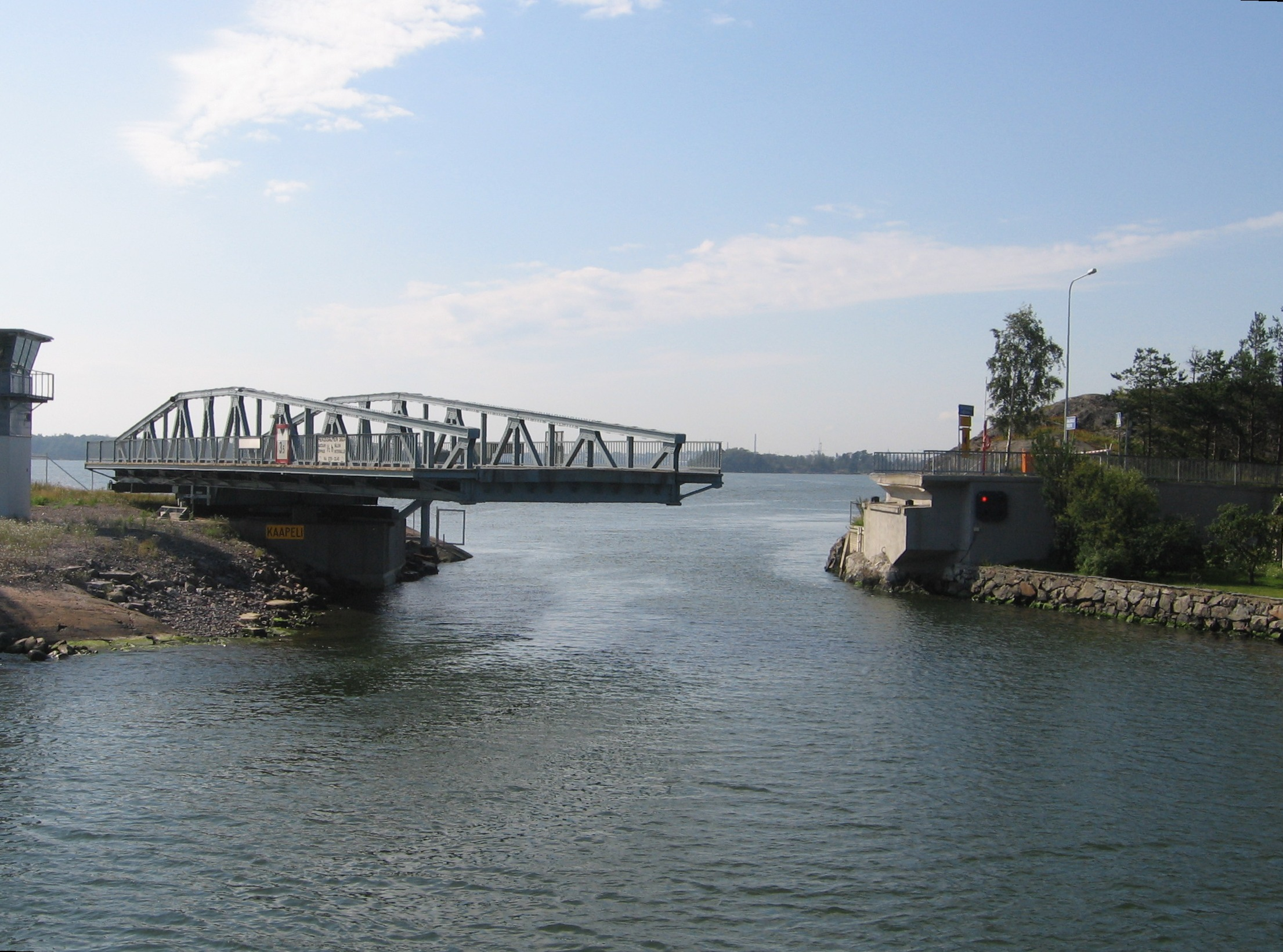

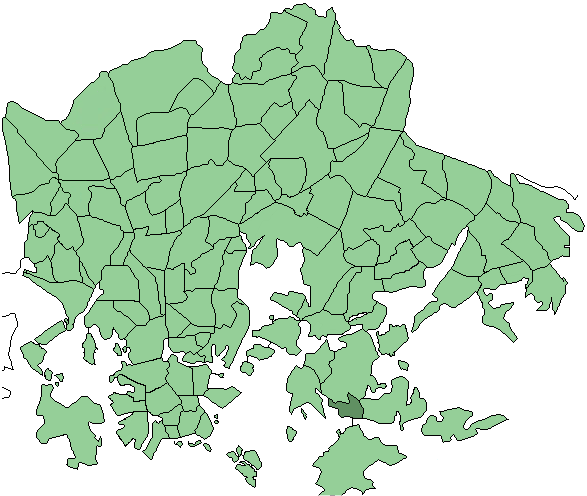
- Location in Helsinki
- Coordinates: 60.16099°N 25.04909°E
- Country: Finland
- Province: Southern Finland
- Region: Uusimaa
- Sub-region: Helsinki
- Time zone: UTC+2 (EET)
  - Summer (DST): UTC+3 (EEST)

Hevossalmi (Finnish), Hästnässund (Swedish) is a southeastern neighborhood of Helsinki, Finland.
