= Vartiosaari =

Coordinates: 60°11′06″N 025°04′36″E

Vartiosaari (in Finnish) Vårdö (in Swedish)
- Subdistrict of Helsinki
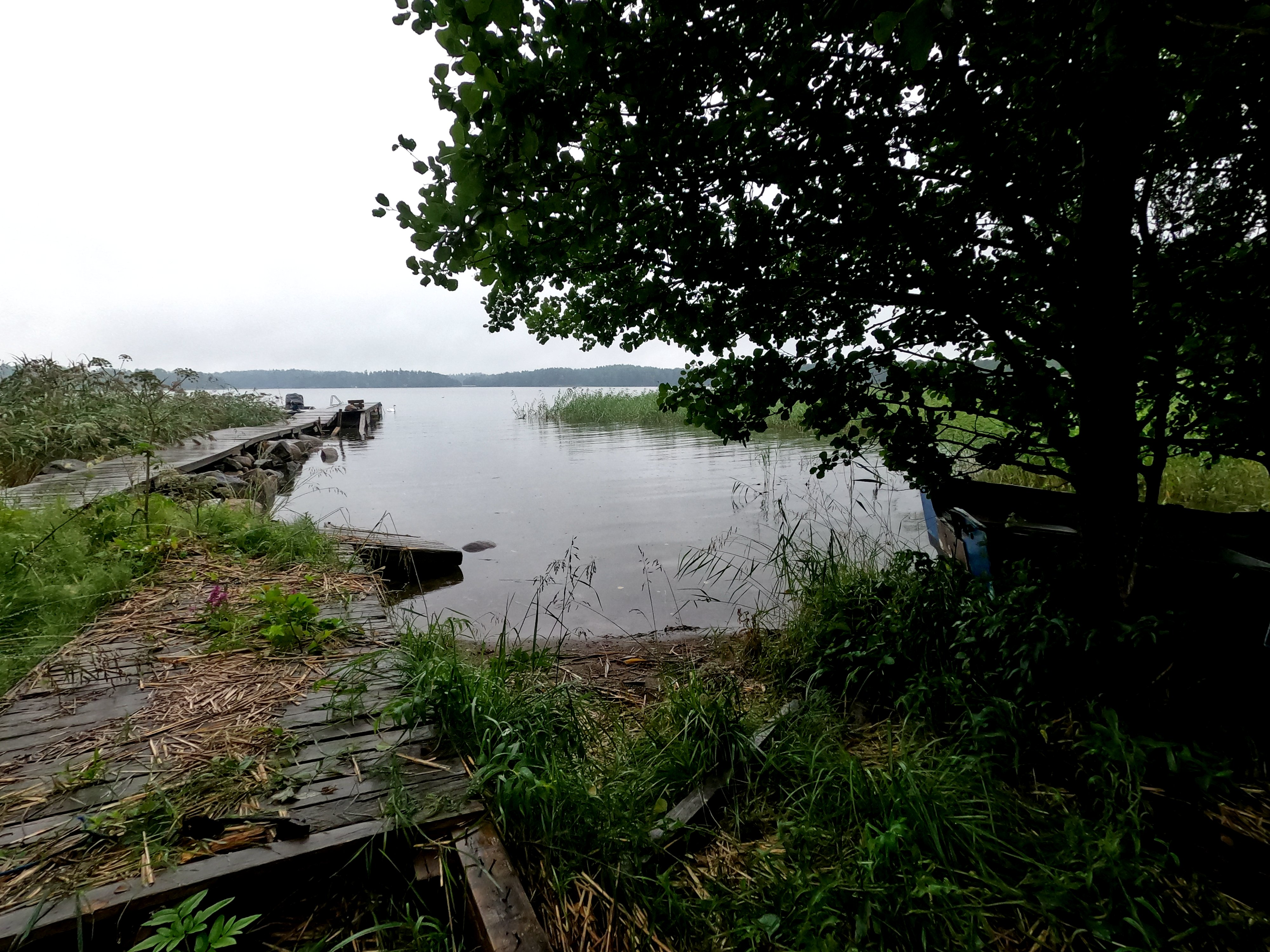

- Location in Helsinki
- Country: Finland
- Province: Southern Finland
- Region: Uusimaa
- Sub-region: Helsinki
- Time zone: UTC+2 (EET)
  - Summer (DST): UTC+3 (EEST)

Vartiosaari (Swedish: Vårdö) is a district of Helsinki, Finland.
