= Villinki =

Coordinates: 60°10′N 25°07′E

Villinki (in Finnish) Villinge (in Swedish)
- Subdistrict of Helsinki
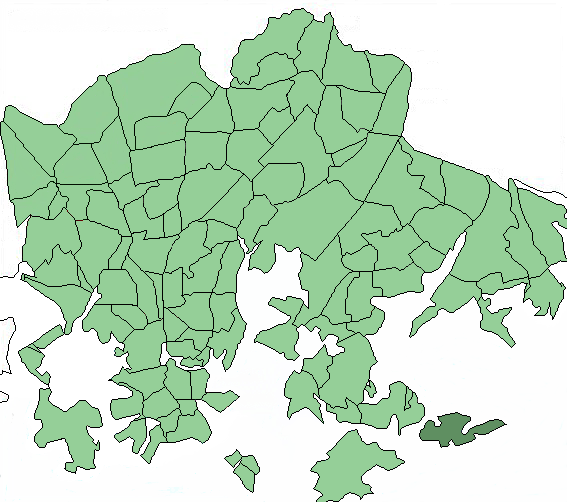
- Location in Helsinki
- Country: Finland
- Province: Southern Finland
- Region: Uusimaa
- Sub-region: Helsinki

Area
  - Total: 0.66 sq mi (1.7 km^{2})
- Time zone: UTC+2 (EET)
  - Summer (DST): UTC+3 (EEST)

Villinki (Swedish: Villinge) is an island and a subdistrict of Helsinki, Finland.
