= Tahvonlahti =

Tahvonlahti (in Finnish) Stansvik (in Swedish)
- Neighborhood of Helsinki
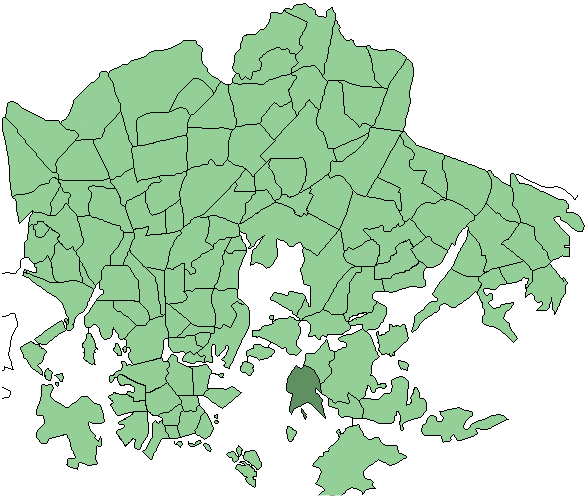
- Location in Helsinki
- Coordinates: 60.1675°N 25.02226°E
- Country: Finland
- Province: Southern Finland
- Region: Uusimaa
- Sub-region: Helsinki
- Time zone: UTC+2 (EET)
  - Summer (DST): UTC+3 (EEST)

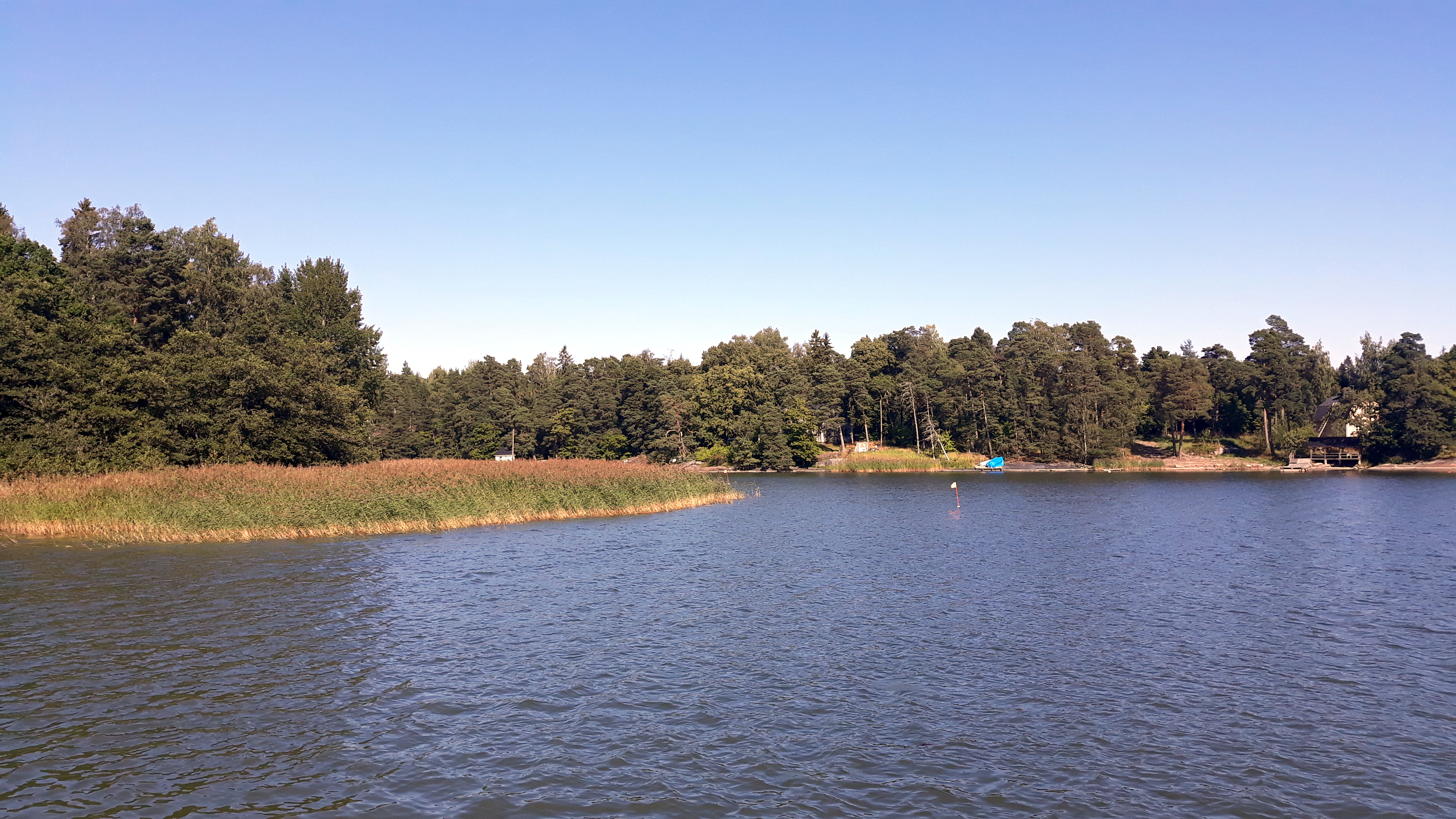
Tahvonlahti bay as seen from the pier of Stansvik Manor.

Tahvonlahti (Finnish), Stansvik (Swedish) is a southeastern neighborhood of Helsinki, Finland.
