= Jollas, Helsinki =

Coordinates: 60°10′N 25°05′E

Jollas
- Neighborhood of Helsinki
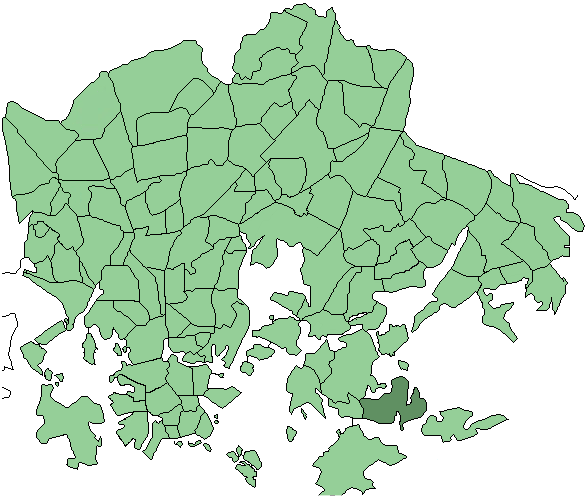
- Location in Helsinki
- Country: Finland
- Province: Southern Finland
- Region: Uusimaa
- Sub-region: Helsinki

Population
  - Total: 3 080 (1.1.2023)
- Time zone: UTC+2 (EET)
  - Summer (DST): UTC+3 (EEST)
- Postal code: 00850

Jollas is a southeastern neighborhood of about 3000 people in Helsinki, Finland located in the eastern part of the Laajasalo island.

Jollas was for a long time a loose single-family area with old wooden houses, but since the 1980s the area has been more densely built up.

The history of Jollas begins with the Jollas Manor in 1798. The present main building of the manor dates back to 1919 and was designed by Robert Tikkanen.

== Nature ==
The nature of Jollas represents the inland Archipelago zone of southern Finland with its rocky and sandy terrain, dry cliffs and lush marshes. There are traces of the Ice Age in Tonttuvuori with a double giant's kettle. There is also a small four-hectare nature reserve called Jollaksen räme near Furuvik beach.

Furuvik Beach is located in the southwestern part of Jollas

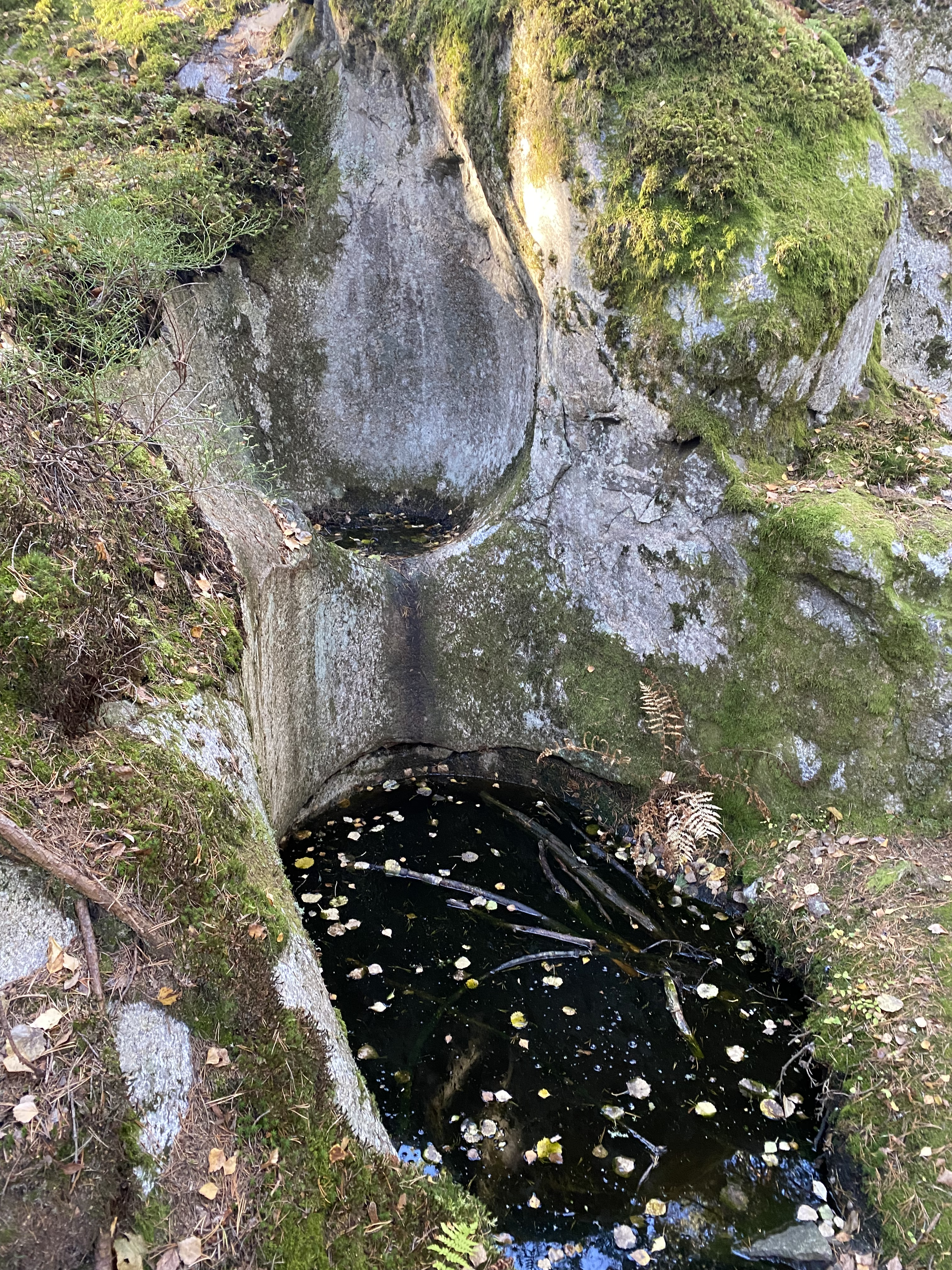
Double giant’s kettle in Jollas

== Matosaari ==
Matosaari was a small island located in Jollas, Helsinki. It is now connected to the mainland by a land bridge. In the early 20th century, Villa Sommarro was situated on the island; the villa burned down in the 1960s, and its ruins remain on the site today.

The land bridge connecting Matosaari to Jollas is thought to have been constructed during the Crimean War, when Matosaari was part of the larger Helsinki coastal fortifications. The island hosted a significant battery equipped with 14 cannons.

Matosaari is also home to the Helsinki Sea Rescue Association

== The Contract Killing of Wilhelm Högsten ==
On 24 April 1992, Wilhelm Högsten, the owner of a silk weaving company, was murdered in his home in Jollas, Helsinki. During the early hours of the morning, intruders broke into the house and shot the 77-year-old, immobile Högsten four times as he lay in bed. Before the killing, the perpetrators had cut the telephone line to prevent any emergency call from being made.

The gunman, Ilpo Tapio Larha, entered the house through the balcony and carried out the murder using a 7.65 mm pistol. The investigation later revealed that the contract killing had been ordered by Högsten’s own son, Fred Arnold Christian Högsten. His motive was financial gain from inheritance, and the agreed payment for the murder was 500,000 Finnish marks. The contract killing also involved Hannu Sakari Ratia, who acted as the driver and an accomplice.

== Transport and services ==
You can get to Jollas from Herttoniemi metro station with buses 85 and 85K. At night, bus 85N runs from Helsinki Railway Square. The main stop for Jollas is at the eastern end of Puuskaniementie. The bus has morning and night departures on weekends. In addition, the Jollas commuter bus 802 runs from Monday to Friday from 7.45 to 16.30 and has eight daily services in each direction.

Jollaksentie 89 is home to a hotel called Jollas89, which opened in 2018. It is located in the former premises of the S Group Training Centre Jollas Institute. The Jollas Institute moved to Vallila in 2016.

The pizza restaurant Fornitaly is also located in Jollas.

Jollas is home to Poikkilaakso Primary School and Snellman College.
