= Santahamina =

Island and neighbourhood of Helsinki, Finland

Coordinates: 60°09′N 025°03′E

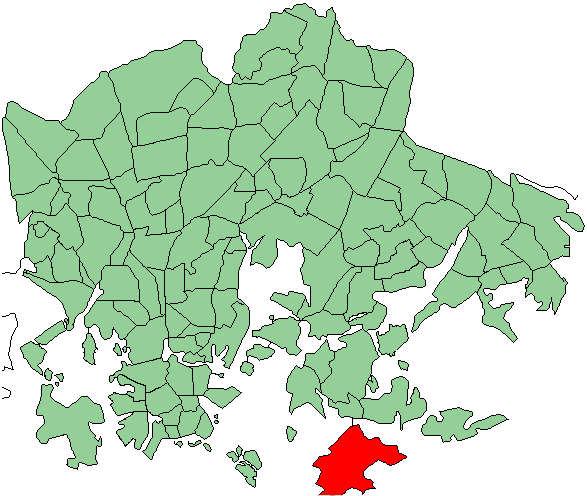
Location of Santahamina within Helsinki

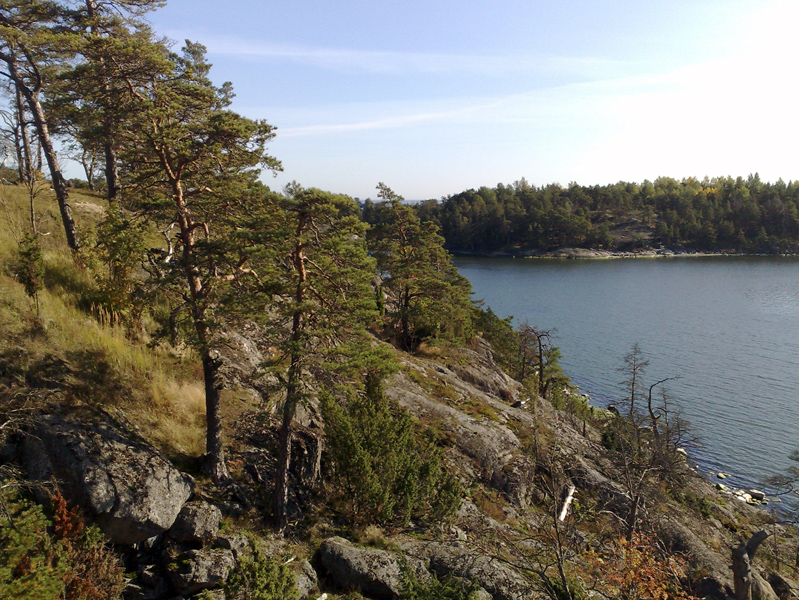
View south from the southwestern shore of Santahamina

Santahamina (Swedish: Sandhamn) is an island and neighbourhood of Eastern Helsinki, Finland. At present it is a military base housing the Guard Jaeger Regiment, making access restricted. The Finnish National Defence University (NDU) is also located on the island. The C-Lion1 undersea cable comes ashore at Santahamina.

Santahamina housed before 2007 a mediumwave broadcasting station used by Yle for broadcasting on 558 kHz with 100 kW.
