= Itäsaaret =

Coordinates: 59.978°N 21.830°E

Itäsaaret (in Finnish) Östra holmarna (in Swedish)
- Neighborhood of Helsinki
- Interactive map of Itäsaaret (in Finnish); Östra holmarna (in Swedish)
- Country: Finland
- Province: Southern Finland
- Region: Uusimaa
- Sub-region: Helsinki
- Time zone: UTC+2 (EET)
  - Summer (DST): UTC+3 (EEST)

Itäsaaret (Finnish), Östra holmarna (Swedish) is a southeastern neighborhood of Helsinki, Finland.
