= Herttoniemen teollisuusalue =

Herttoniemen teollisuusalue Hertonäs industriområde
- Helsinki Subdivision
- Position of Herttoniemen teollisuusalue within Helsinki
- Coordinates: 60.198242°N 25.040962°E
- Country: Finland
- Region: Uusimaa
- Sub-region: Greater Helsinki
- Municipality: Helsinki
- District: Southeastern
- Subdivision regions: is a quarter of the Herttoniemi neighbourhood
- Area: 0.91 km^{2} (0.35 sq mi)
- Population (2005): 55
  - Density: 60/km^{2} (160/sq mi)
- Postal codes: 00810, 00811
- Subdivision number: 434
- Neighbouring subdivisions: Herttoniemenranta; Länsi-Herttoniemi; Roihuvuori; Roihupellon teollisuusalue

Herttoniemen teollisuusalue (Finnish, Swedish: Hertonäs industriområde) is a southeastern neighborhood of Helsinki, Finland.
