= Herttoniemenranta =

Coordinates: 60°11′26″N 25°02′02″E

Herttoniemenranta Hertonäs strand
- Helsinki Subdivision
- Position of Herttoniemenranta within Helsinki
- Country: Finland
- Region: Uusimaa
- Sub-region: Greater Helsinki
- Municipality: Helsinki
- District: Southeastern
- Subdivision regions: is a quarter of the Herttoniemi neighbourhood
- Area: 095 km^{2} (37 sq mi)
- Population (1.1.2016): 9 051
  - Density: 8/km^{2} (21/sq mi)
- Postal codes: 00810
- Subdivision number: 433
- Neighbouring subdivisions: Herttoniemen teollisuusalue Länsi-Herttoniemi; Roihuvuori; Roihupellon teollisuusalue

Herttoniemenranta (Finnish), Hertonäs strand (Swedish) is a southeastern neighborhood of Helsinki, Finland. Herttoniemenranta is part of Herttoniemi and it was built in the late 1990s and early 2000s. Herttoniemenrannan ala-aste is an elementary school in Herttoniemenranta.
