= Roihuvuori =

Coordinates: 60°12′N 25°04′E

Roihuvuori Kasberget
- Helsinki Subdivision
- Position of Roihuvuori within Helsinki
- Country: Finland
- Region: Uusimaa
- Sub-region: Greater Helsinki
- Municipality: Helsinki
- District: Southeastern
- Subdivision regions: none
- Area: 1.47 km^{2} (0.57 sq mi)
- Population (2006): 7,488
  - Density: 5,094/km^{2} (13,190/sq mi)
- Postal codes: 00800, 00810, 00811, 00820
- Subdivision number: 432
- Neighbouring subdivisions: Herttoniemenranta; Itäkeskus; Länsi-Herttoniemi; Marjaniemi; Roihupelto; Tammisalo

Roihuvuori (Swedish: Kasberget, or Roihis and Roihikka, literal translation Blaze Mountain) is a quarter, part of Herttoniemi neighbourhood in Helsinki, Finland. The population of Roihuvuori is approximately 8,000 and its area is 1.47 km^{2}. There is a church, two schools, shops and restaurants in Roihuvuori. There is also a water tower, Japanese style garden, playground Tuhkimo and Kirsikkapuisto where a Hanami festival is held.

Each street in Roihuvuori was named after fairy tales, with the exception being Roihuvuori's main street (Roihuvuorentie). For example, Lumikintie is "Snow White Street" and Tuhkimotie is "Cinderella Street". The name of the neighbourhood itself was originally planned to become Satumaa (lit. [fairy] tale land).

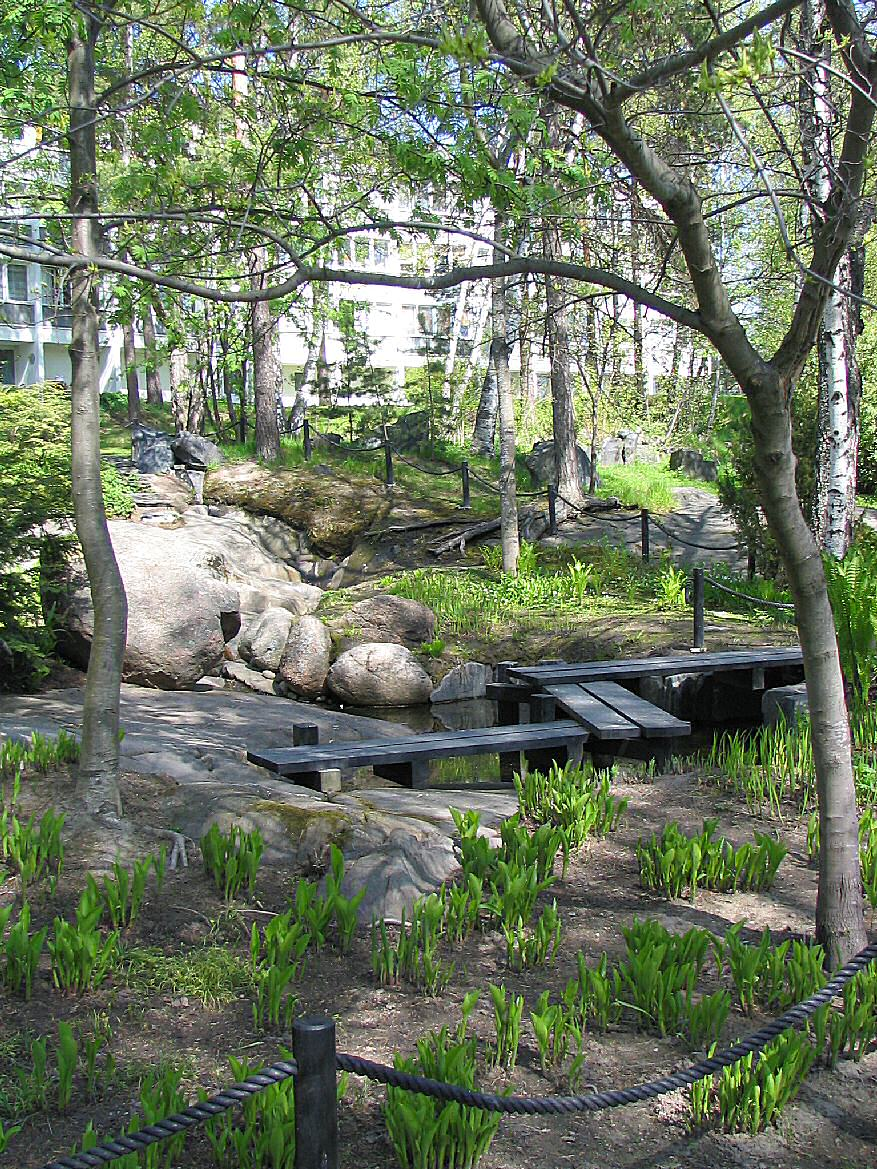
Japanese style garden

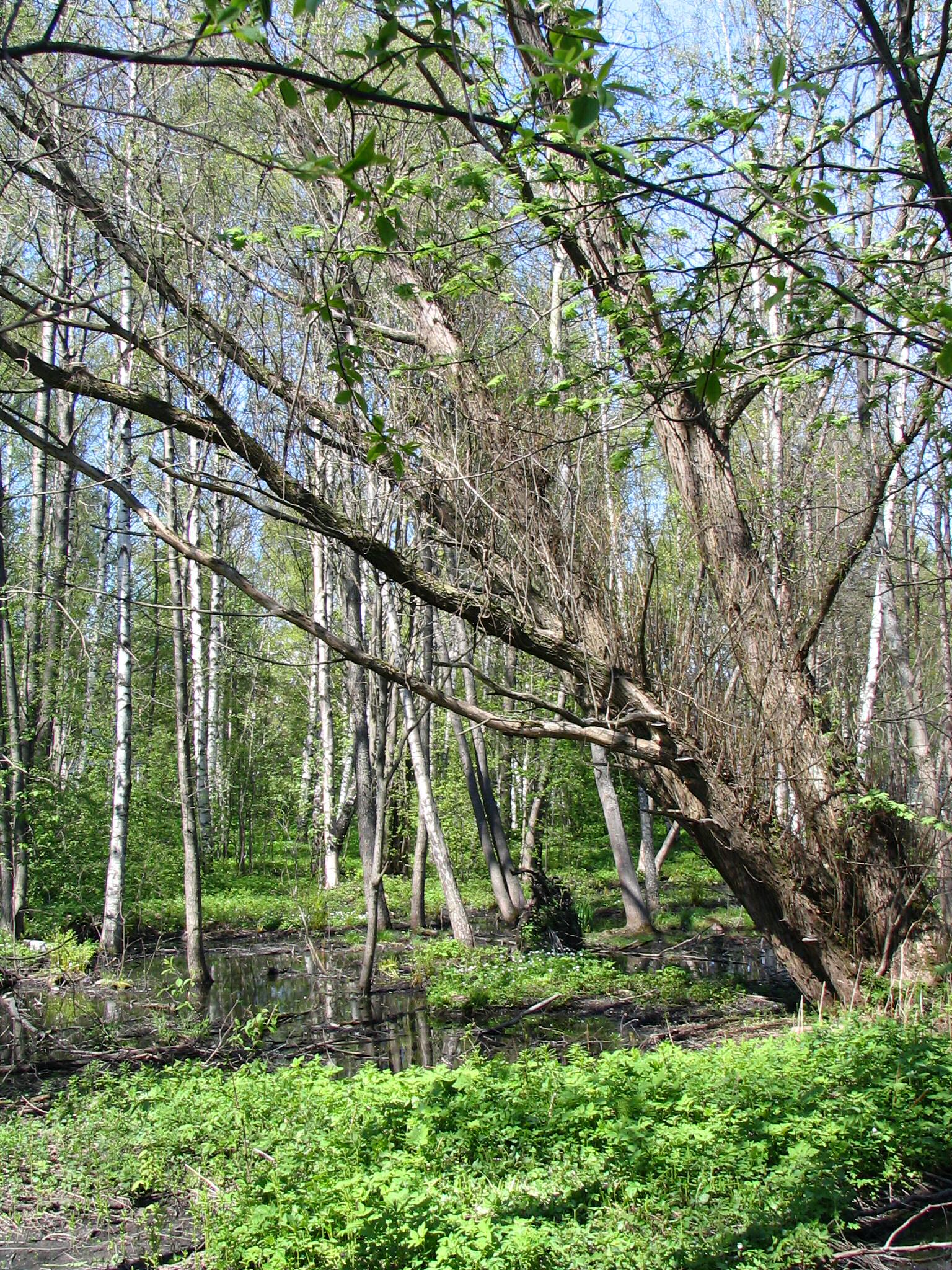
An alder forest at Strömsinlahti, Roihuvuori

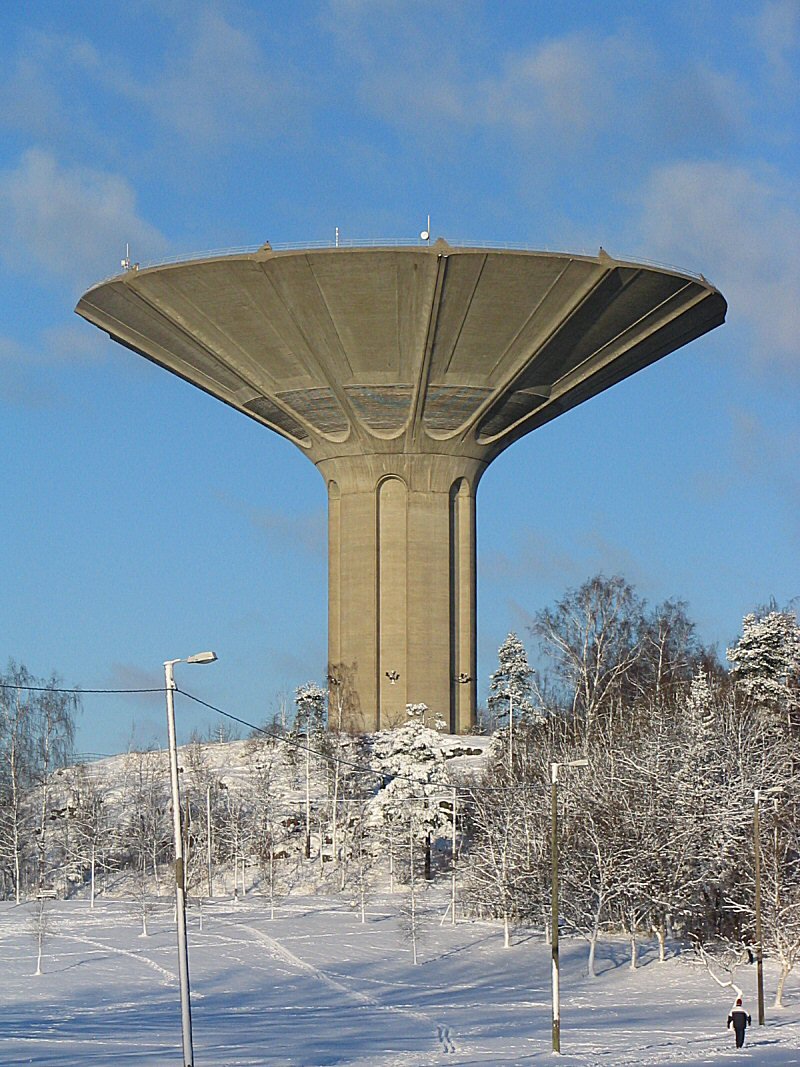
The Roihuvuori water tower

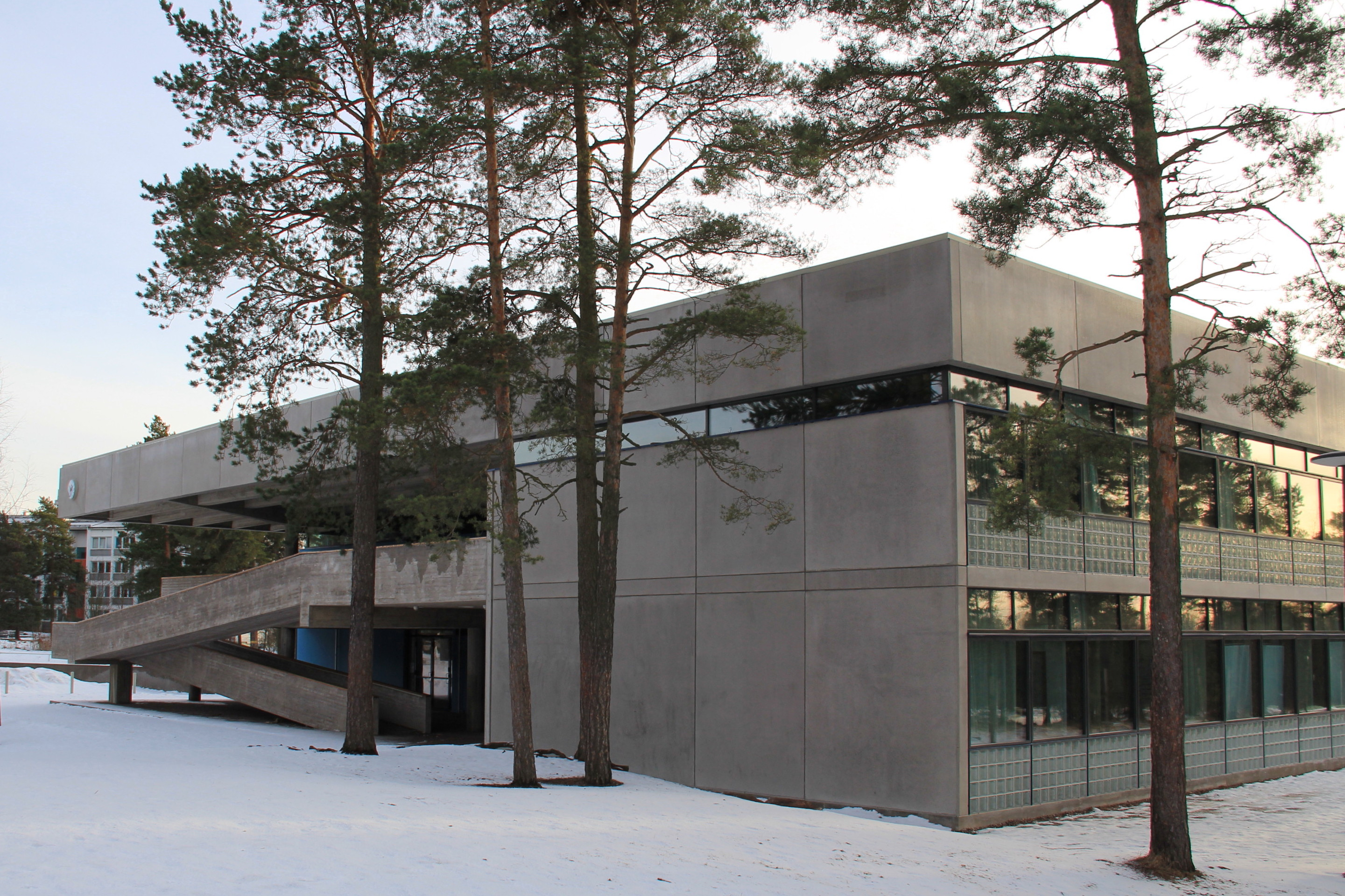
Roihuvuori school, designed by Aarno Ruusuvuori (1967)
