= Playground Tuhkimo =

Park in Helsinki, Finland

Coordinates: 60°11′53″N 25°03′10″E

Playground Tuhkimo Leikkipuisto Tuhkimo, Lekparken Askungen
Kartta leikkipuistosta
Address	Tuhkimontie 10–12, 00820 Helsinki
Open	in weekdays from 9am to 4pm
Owner	City of Helsinki
Services form	Public social services
Staff	3
Area	9,312 m^{2}
Swimming-pool	800 m^{2}
Skating-rink	2,049 m^{2}
Use	Playground; Student snacks Family activity Inhabitant activity
Eating	6.2 – 8.1 weekdays at 12 am free of charge to all under 17 of age
Architect	Irma Mikkola (general plan)

Playground Tuhkimo (Leikkipuisto Tuhkimo in Finnish, Lekparken Askungen in Swedish) is a public, free of charge park at Roihuvuori district in Helsinki, Finland.

== General ==
The playground is located in a valley between two Metamorphic rocks. From the rocks, the area can clearly be seen dating back to the tracks of the ice age. In the 19th century, the area belonged to a tenant farmer called Kiilatorppa from Herttoniemi estate. A map from 1936 showed that this area was just a field.

The Park's name, Tuhkimo comes from the fairy tale Cinderella (Tuhkimo in Finnish). The park has been particularly popular with families. The playground is surrounded by Roihuvuori forests, but from the south, it ends in Tuhkimontie (street).

== Gallery ==
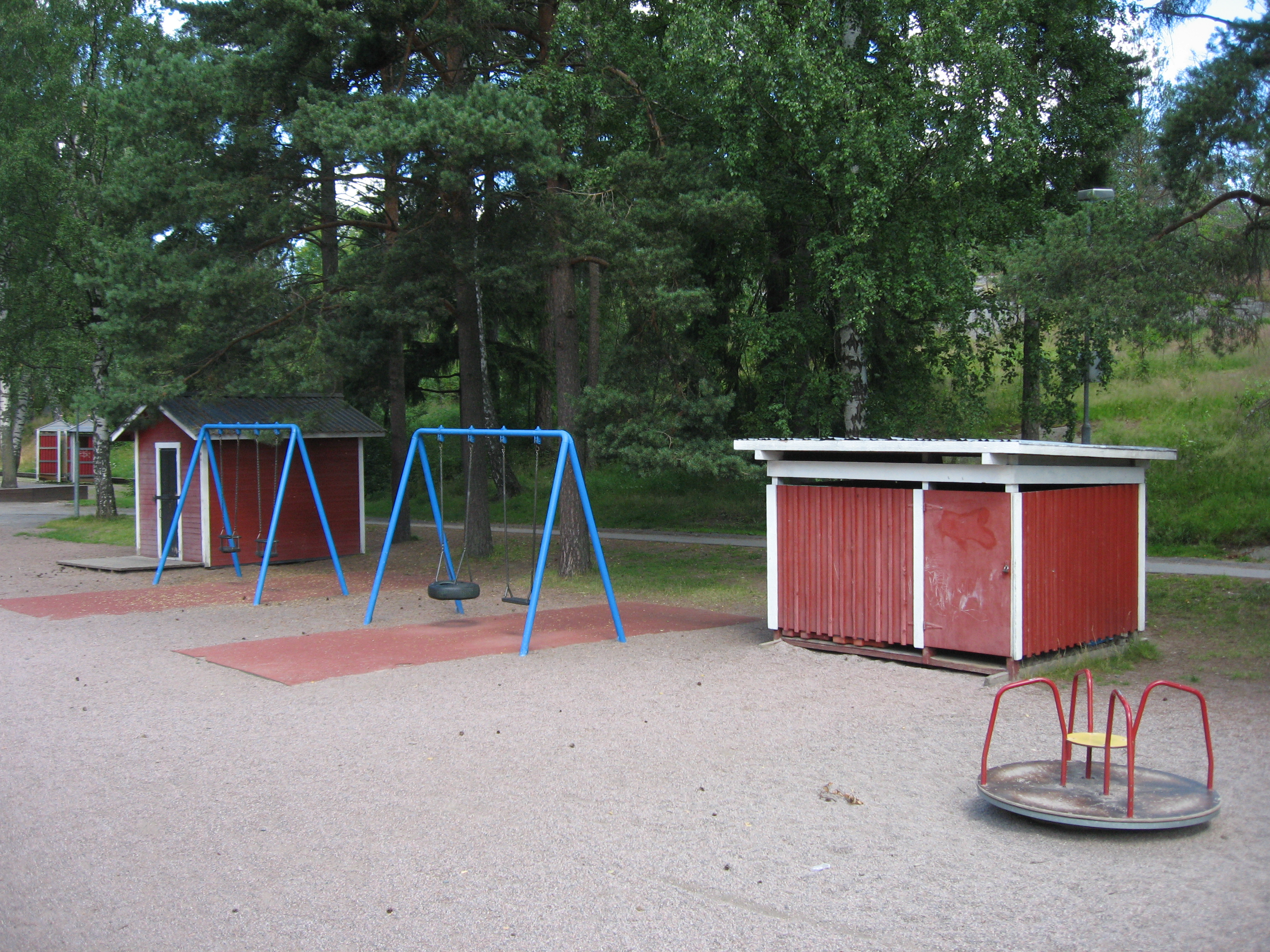
Swings in the park

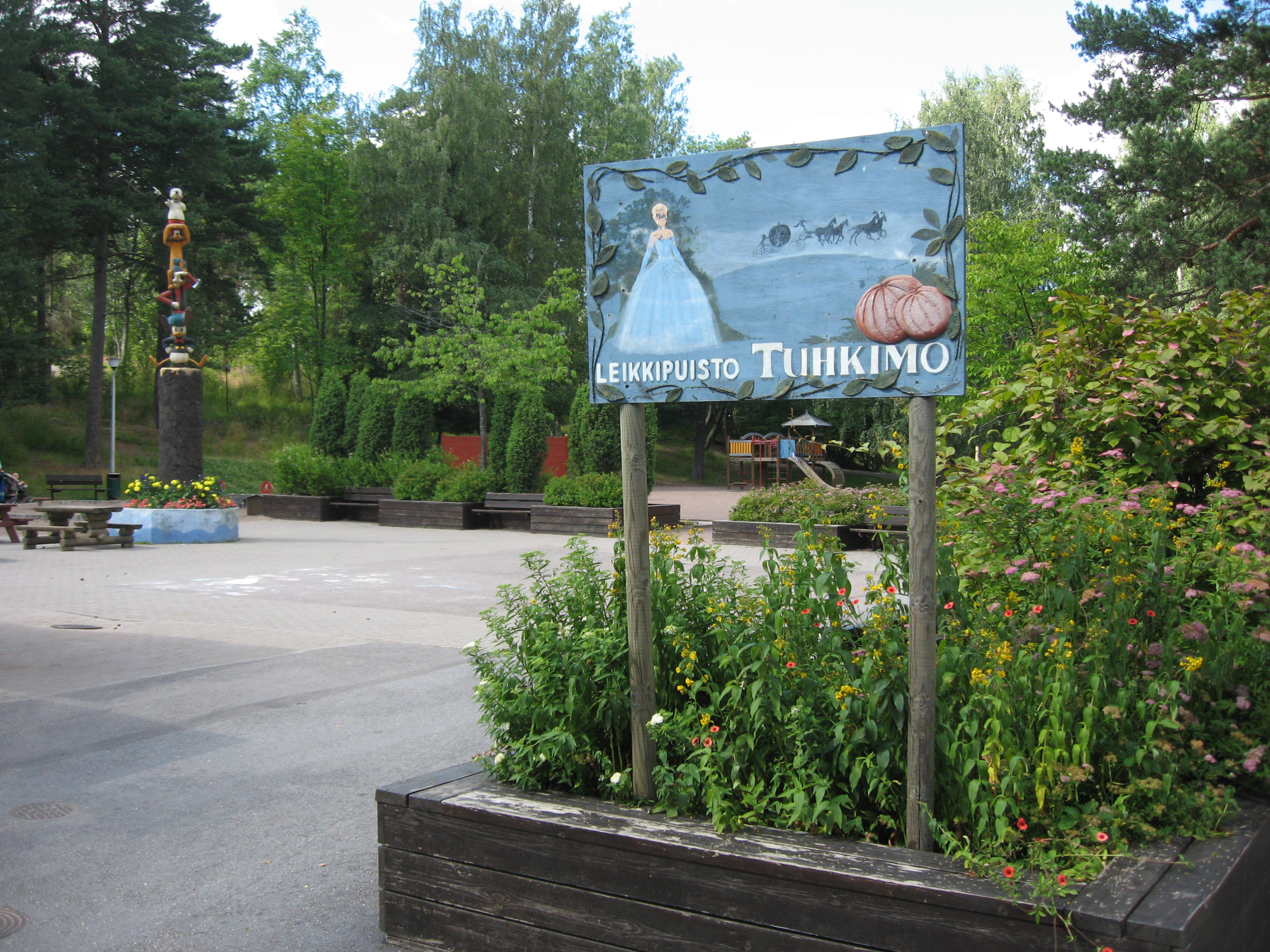
Sign of the park

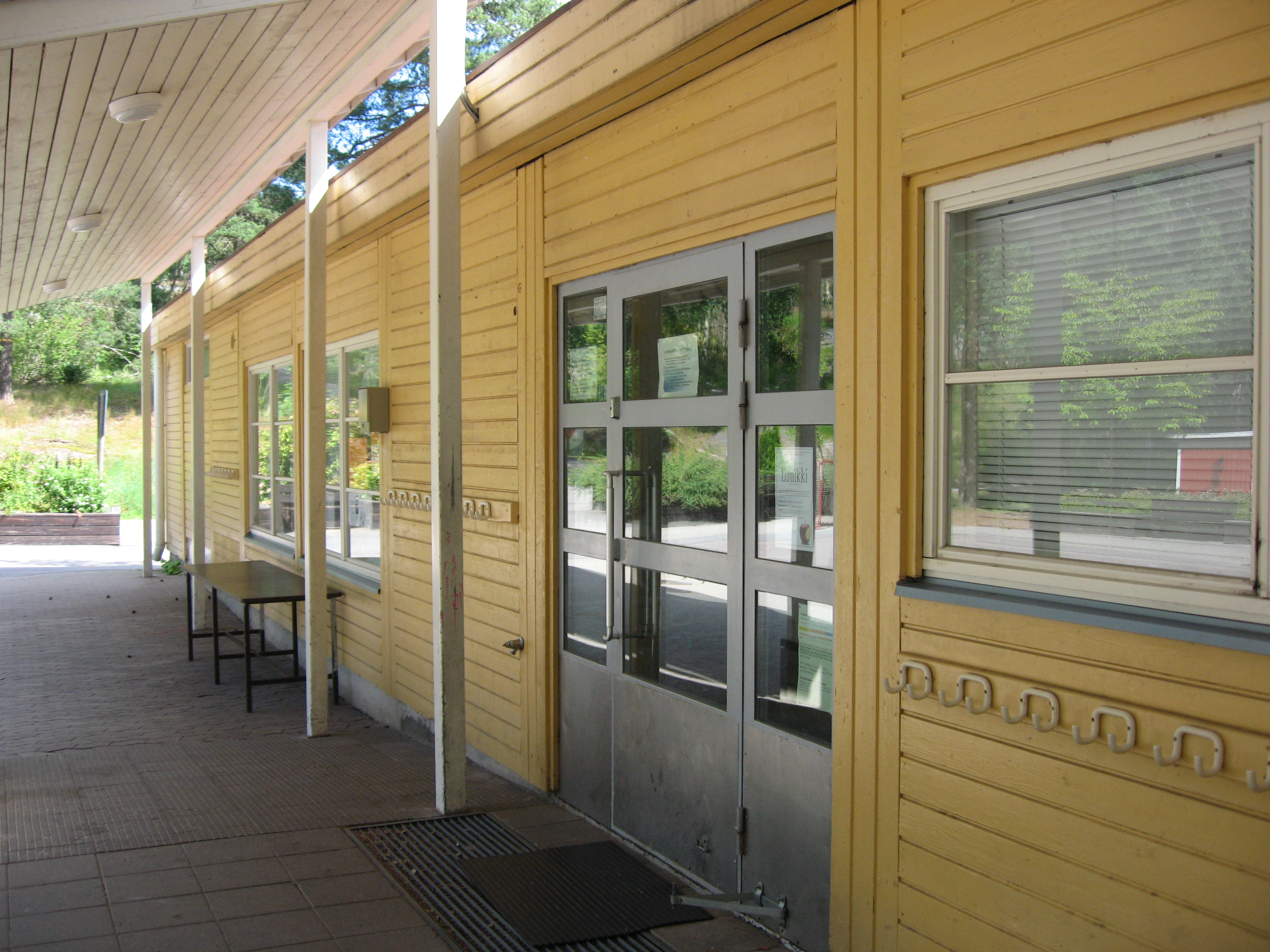
House of playground

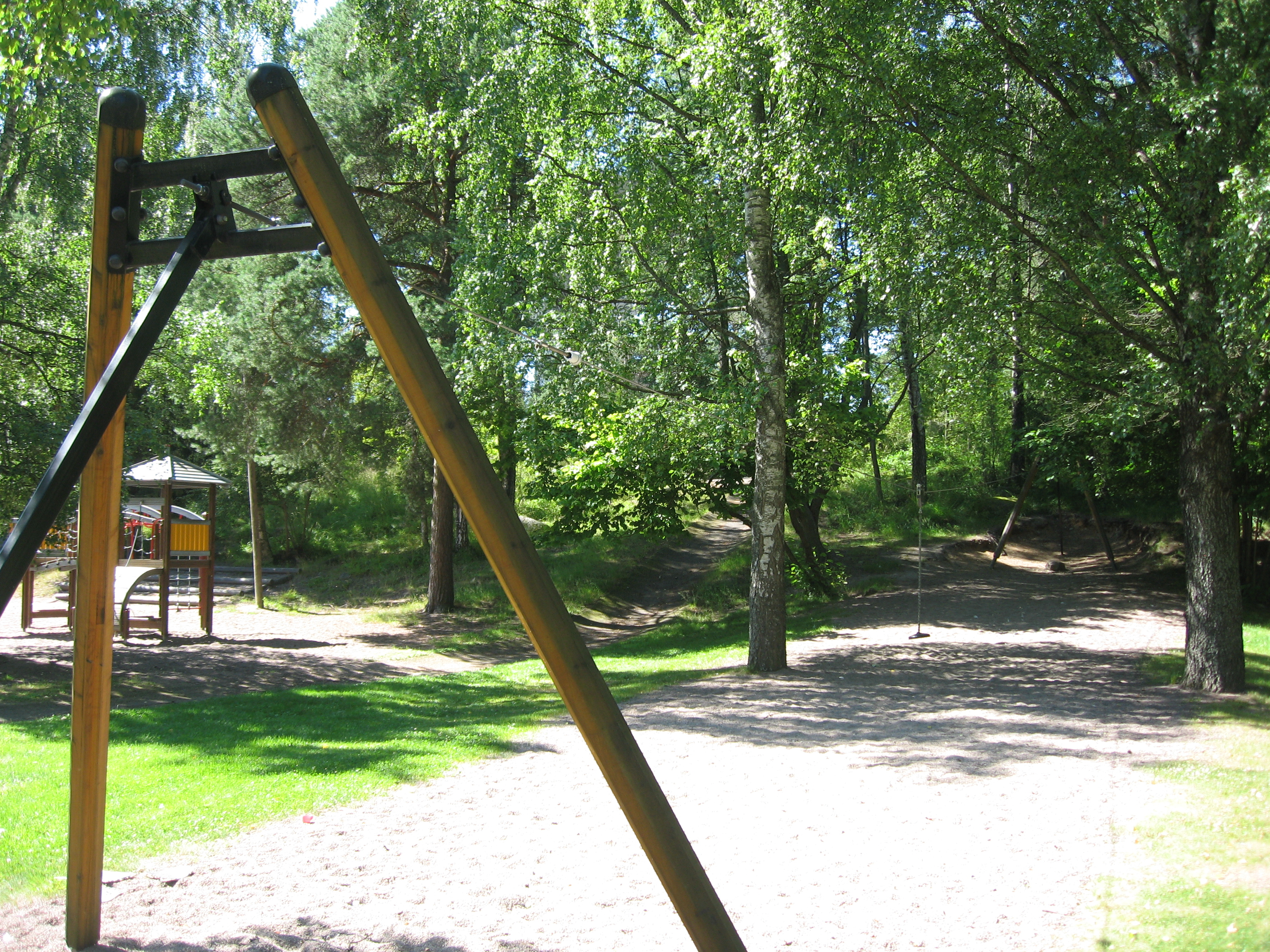
Let go cable

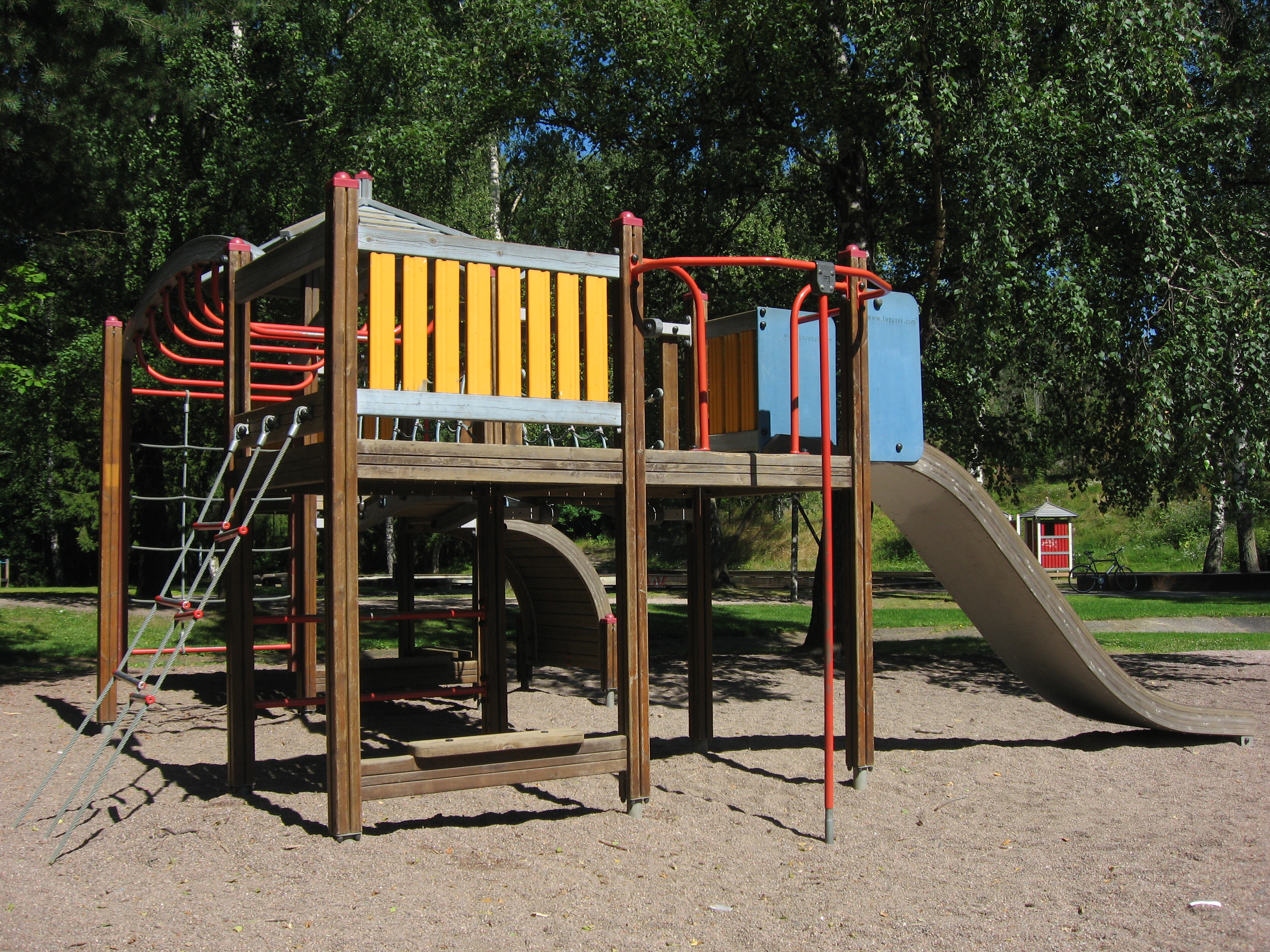
Slides

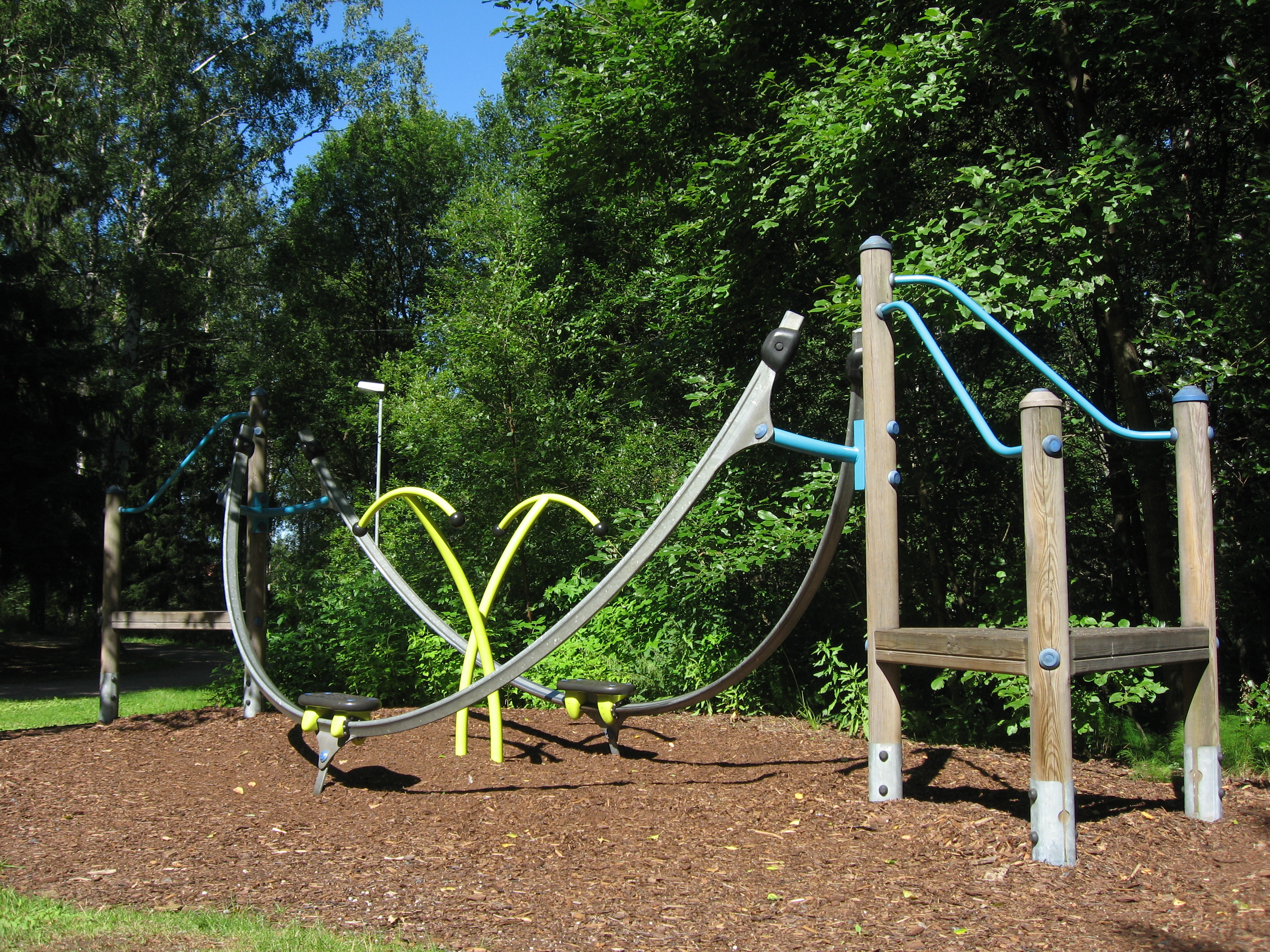
Swing

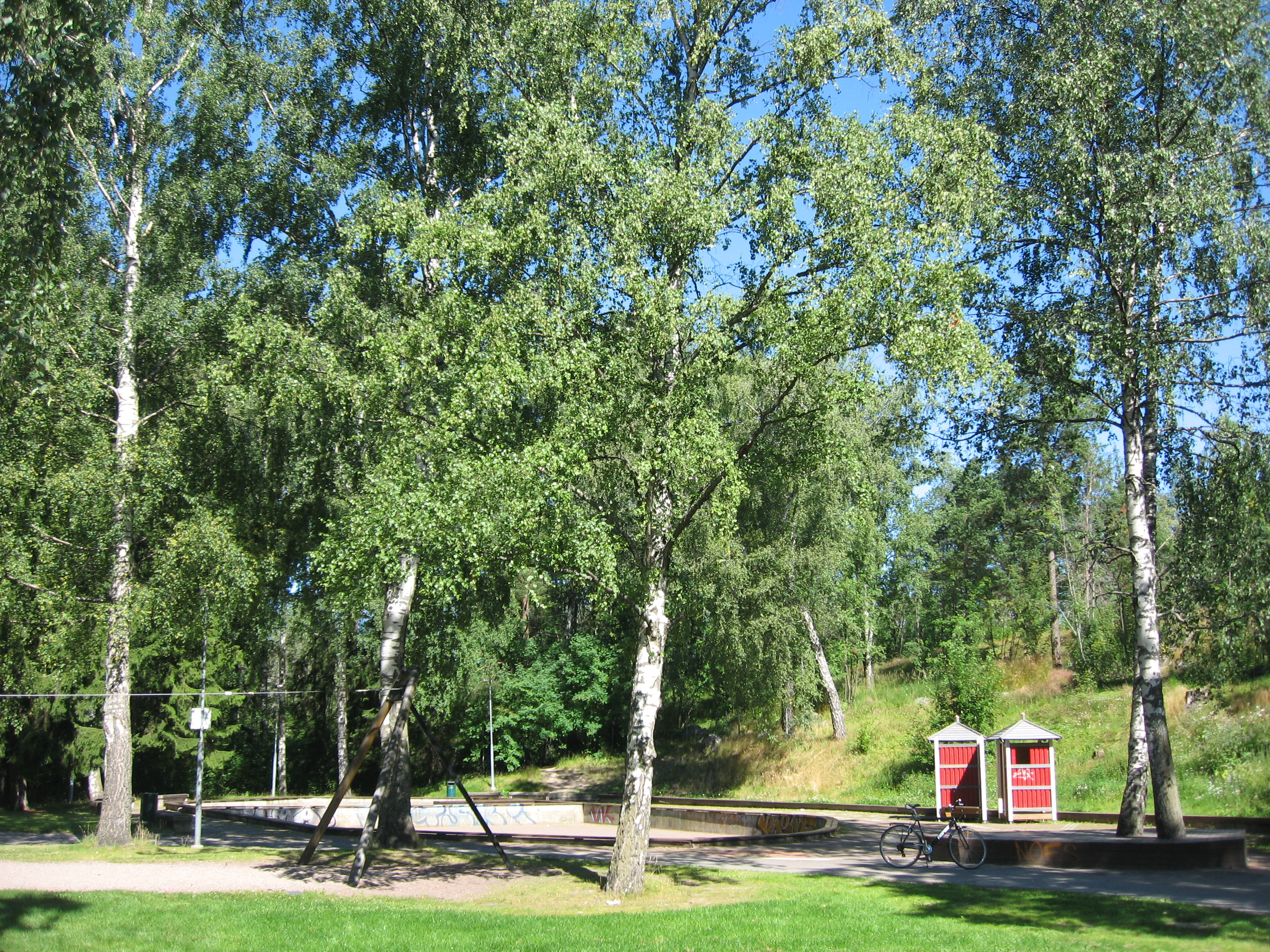
Swimming-pool

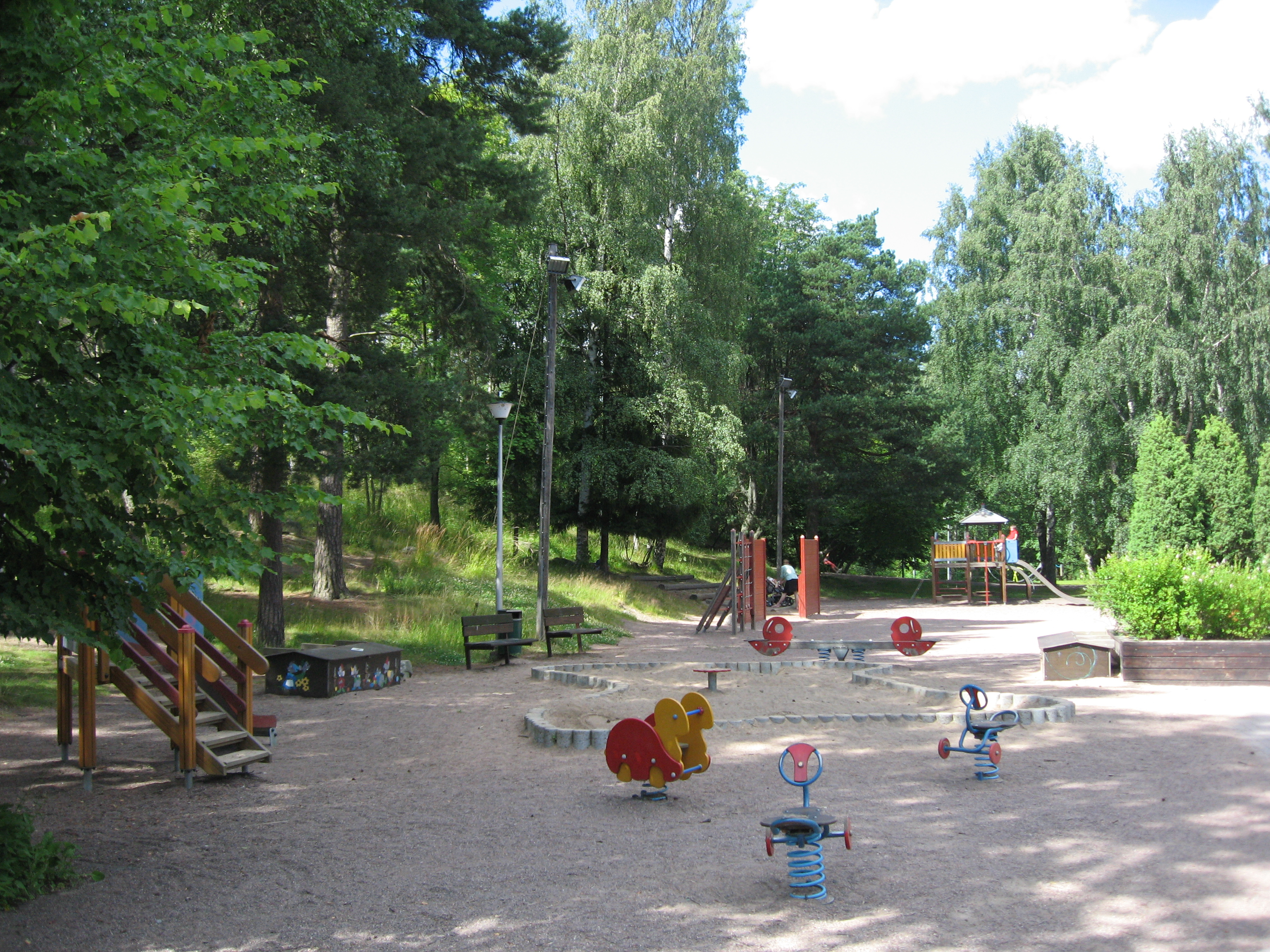
Other swings
