= Länsi-Herttoniemi =

Coordinates: 60°13′N 25°02′E

Länsi-Herttoniemi Västra Hertonäs
- Helsinki Subdivision
- Position of Länsi-Herttoniemi within Helsinki
- Country: Finland
- Region: Uusimaa
- Sub-region: Greater Helsinki
- Municipality: Helsinki
- District: Southeastern
- Subdivision regions: is a quarter of the Herttoniemi neighbourhood
- Area: 273 km^{2} (105 sq mi)
- Population (2008): 8 076
  - Density: 2/km^{2} (5.2/sq mi)
- Postal codes: 00800
- Subdivision number: 431
- Neighbouring subdivisions: Kulosaari, Viikinranta, Myllypuro, Roihupellon teollisuusalue, Herttoniemen teollisuusalue, Herttoniemenranta

Länsi-Herttoniemi (Finnish), Västra Hertonäs (Swedish) is a southeastern neighbourhood of Helsinki, Finland. It is one of the subdivisions of the wider Herttoniemi suburb.
