= Tammisalo =

Coordinates: 60°11′28″N 25°03′50″E

Tammisalo Tammelund
- Helsinki Subdivision
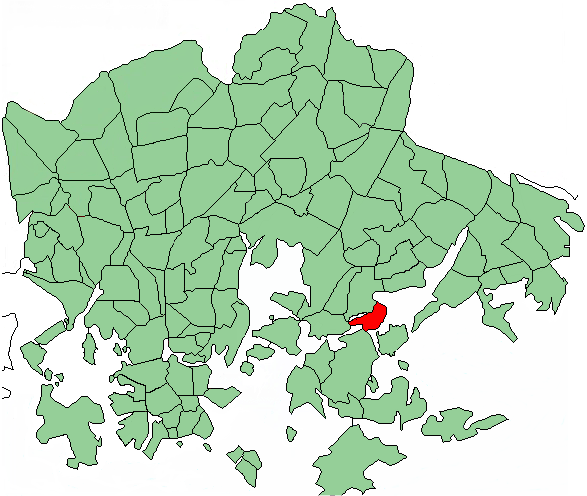
- Position of Tammisalo within Helsinki
- Country: Finland
- Region: Uusimaa
- Sub-region: Greater Helsinki
- Municipality: Helsinki
- District: Southeastern
- Subdivision regions: none
- Area: 0.73 km^{2} (0.28 sq mi)
- Population (2005): 2,183
  - Density: 2,990/km^{2} (7,700/sq mi)
- Postal codes: 00830
- Subdivision number: 44
- Neighbouring subdivisions: Herttoniemi; Laajasalo; Marjaniemi; Roihuvuori; Vartiosaari

Tammisalo (Swedish: Tammelund) is a neighbourhood (number 44) and an island in eastern part of Helsinki, Finland. The population of Tammisalo is approximately 2,200 and its area is 0.73 square kilometres (0.28 square miles). The nearest districts are Herttoniemi, Roihuvuori and Laajasalo. In the Viking era the coastal waterway from Sweden to Arab world went between Tammisalo and the continent along Porolahti bay.

A particularly remarkable building in the low-rise suburb of Tammisalo is the 5-storey house called Tammelund, designed by architect Antti Rantanen (1935), which in terms of its proportions and number of windows (over 100), is regarded as a "miniature skyscraper". Tammisalo is also renowned for housing projects designed by famous modernist architect Timo Penttilä.

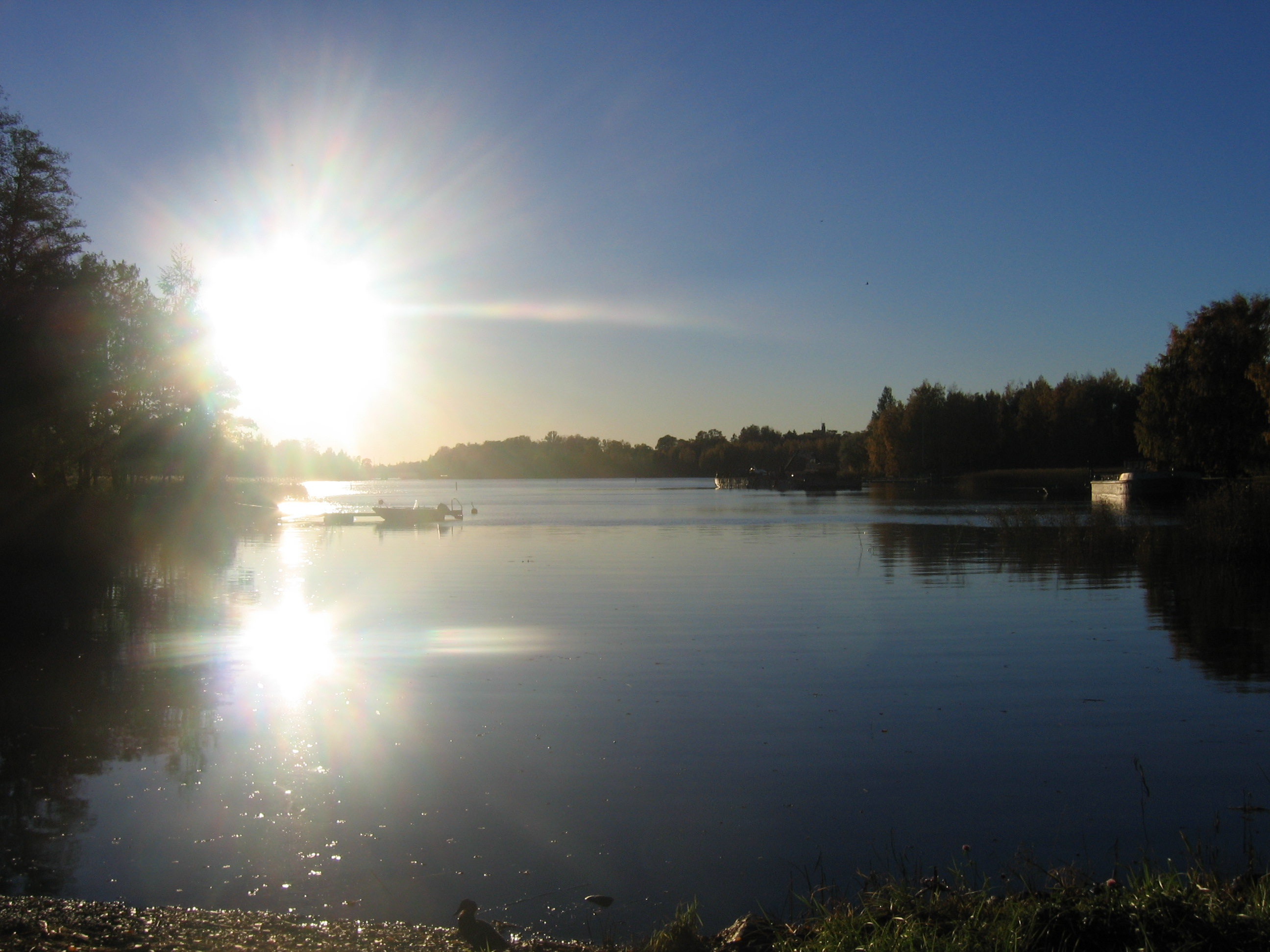
Tiiliruukinlahti near Tammisalo.

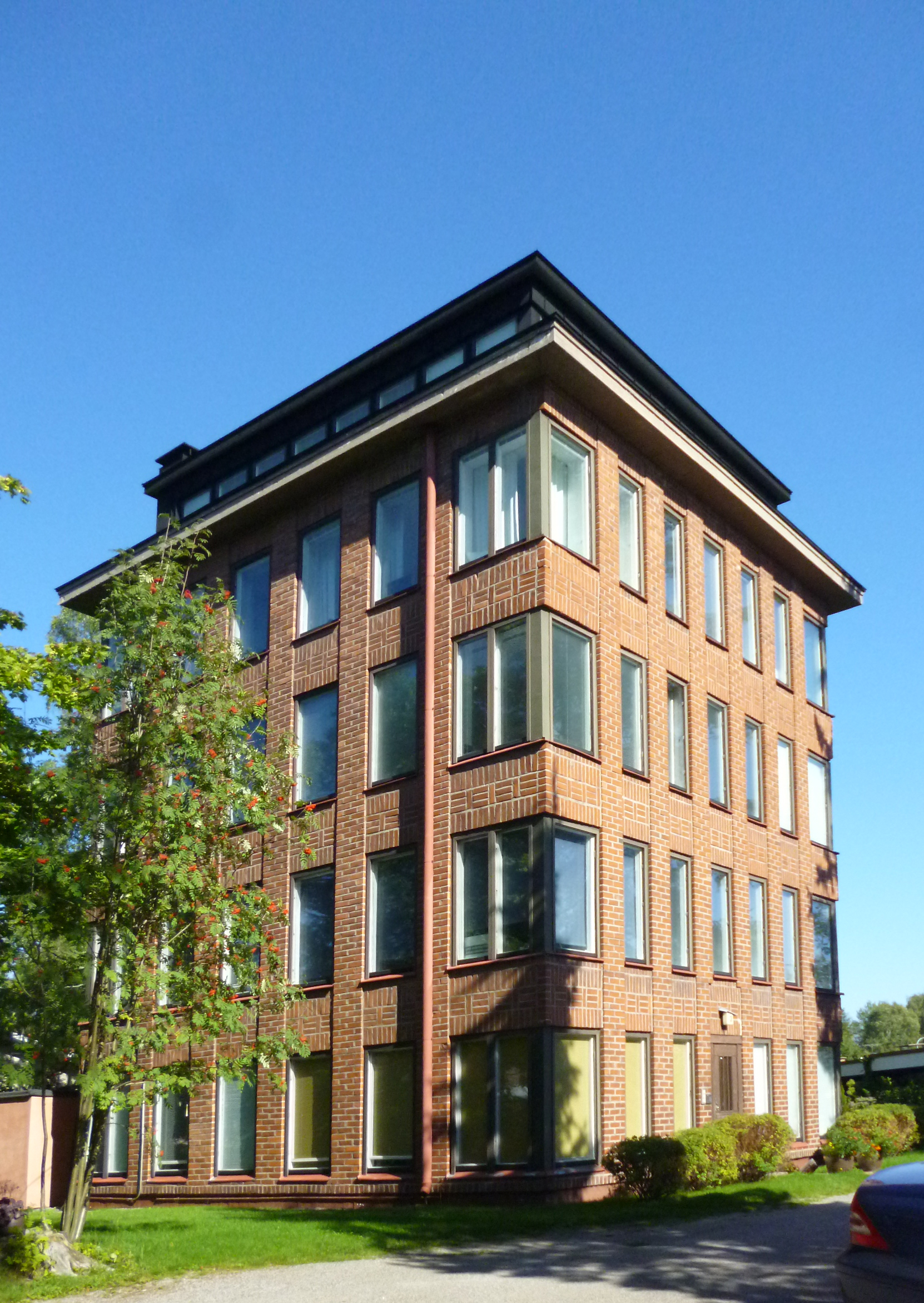
Tammelund tower, Antti Rantanen, 1935.
