= Herttoniemi =

Coordinates: 60°12′N 25°03′E

Herttoniemi Hertonäs
- Helsinki Subdivision
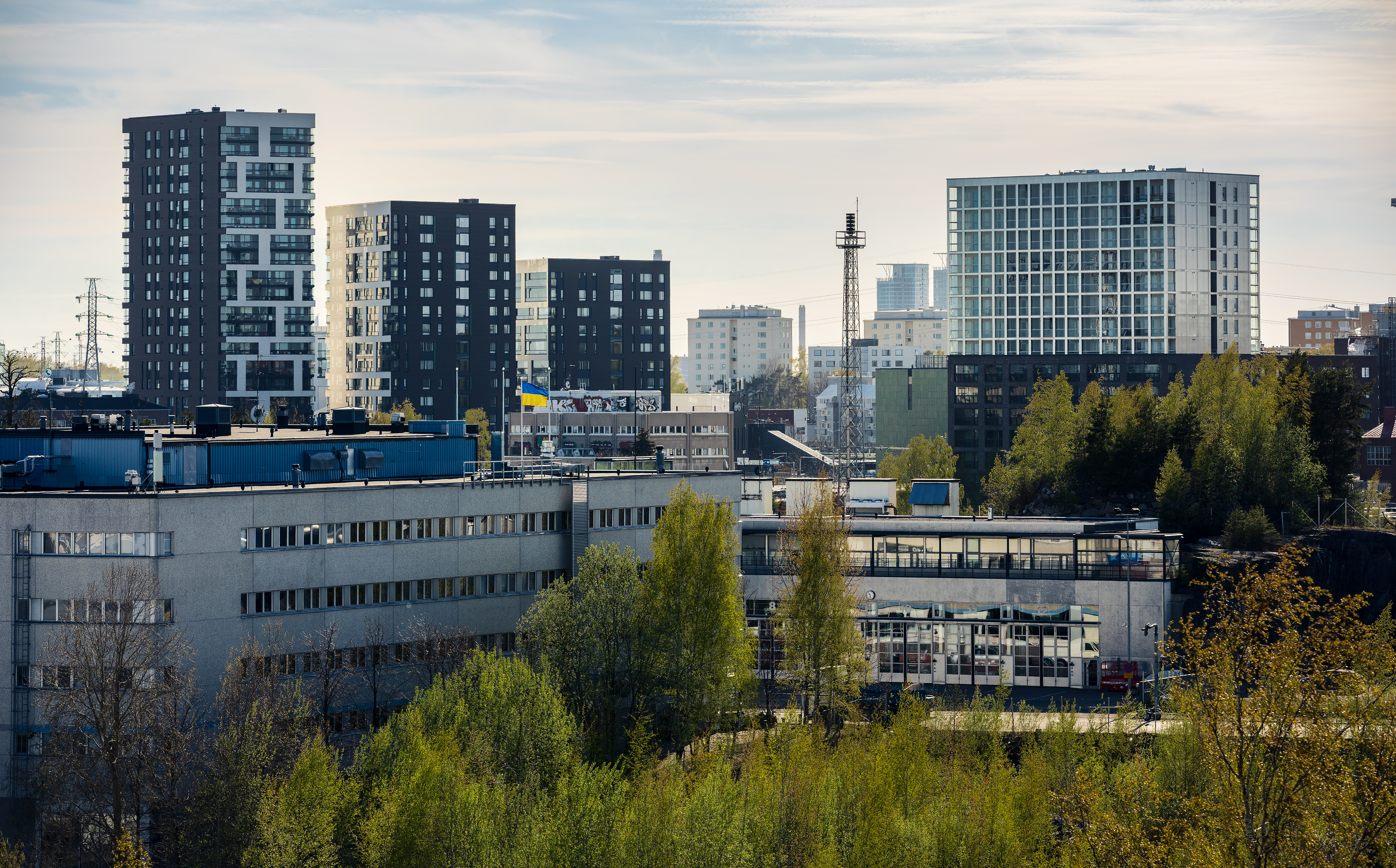
- Highrises in Herttoniemi as seen from the water tower hill in Roihuvuori in May 2022

- Position of Herttoniemi within Helsinki
- Country: Finland
- Region: Uusimaa
- Sub-region: Greater Helsinki
- Municipality: Helsinki
- District: Southeastern
- Subdivision regions: Länsi-Herttoniemi, Roihuvuori, Herttoniemenranta, Herttoniemen teollisuusalue
- Area: 6.06 km^{2} (2.34 sq mi)
- Population (2004): 27,347
  - Density: 4,455/km^{2} (11,540/sq mi)
- Postal codes: 00800, 00810, 00811, 00820
- Subdivision number: 43
- Neighbouring subdivisions: Itäkeskus; Kulosaari; Laajasalo; Marjaniemi; Tammisalo; Viikki

Herttoniemi (Swedish: Hertonäs) is an East Helsinki neighbourhood and a suburb of Helsinki, the Finnish capital.

== Geography ==
Located about 7 kilometres (4.3 mi) east of the city centre, Herttoniemi can be reached by the Helsinki Metro in 10 minutes, or by road via the Itäväylä arterial road (Finnish regional road no. 170) running from the inner-city area through the eastern suburbs.

Herttoniemi comprises four distinct areas:

- Länsi-Herttoniemi (West Herttoniemi)
- Roihuvuori, formerly Itä-Herttoniemi (East Herttoniemi)
- Herttoniemenranta (Herttoniemi Harbour)
- Herttoniemi industrial area

== History ==
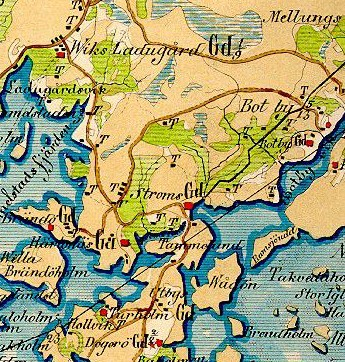
Map of Herttoniemi. Part of a larger map by Kalmberg from 1855

Herttoniemi has been inhabited for a long time. One of Helsinki's Bronze Age graves has been found near the Herttoniemi metro station. Some Finnish place names have also survived in Herttoniemi, which testify that Tavastians have used the area and inhabited it before Swedes colonized Uusimaa. In the light of place names, a permanent settlement by Tavastians occurred possibly as early as the 12th century.

The village of Herttoniemi was one of the oldest in the Helsinge Parish. The Herttoniemi manor is the oldest in eastern Helsinki, and it belonged to the Jägerhorn family already in the 16th century. When Count Augustin Ehrensvärd bought the estate in 1752, the lands of the manor extended to Puotila in the east and to Viikki and Malmi in the north. The area of Myllypuro also belonged to the lands owned by Ehrensvärd. Later, the manor and its lands belonged to Carl Olof Cronstedt, a famous hero of the Battle of Svensksund and the last commandant of Sveaborg (Suomenlinna) during the Swedish reign. In addition to the Herttoniemi manor, the Ströms manor is also located in this area.

The last owner of the Herttoniemi manor, Councillor of agriculture John Bergbom began to rent out plots of the manor lands in 1880 to people who would build villas in the area. The leases were made for 50 years. There would eventually be 70 of such villas in the area. The area of the villas extended from Herttoniemenranta all the way to Fastholma. The villas were inhabited by members of the nobility, by factory owners, businessmen and politicians. The arrived here by steam boats from the city. The travelling time was around 20 minutes. The villas of the wealthy people were in the southern part of the area, but in the north, in the Fastholma area, the villas were inhabited by people of the working class. The latter sometimes had cows in their yards.

The area formed a densely populated community in 1917, although already the year before, that is, in 1916, Bergbom sold the area to a company which was supposed to build a private port and an industrial area in the lands it had acquired. The process of buying back of the villas now began. However, the lands were acquired by the city of Helsinki in 1919, and the development of the community was halted, and no bylaws were written for the community. Almost 30 of the villas were now acquired by the city. They were rented out to clerks of the city, although some were also rented out for year-round use, and some to associations.

The beginning of the end began in the 1930s, when the city began to build an oil terminal in Herttoniemi and a railway line to link it with the existing railway system of the country. The terminal and industrial areas were to have a street network and plans for construction were adopted, for the terminal in 1936 and for the industrial area in 1943. Also a highway was built across the area, where Itäväylä now is located. At that time, some of the villas were torn down, although the biggest changes were to take place only after the war.

By 2020, only one of villas has survived, and many villas seem to have disappeared without even photographs existing of them, says second hand book seller, historian and writer Jan Strang, who is planning to write a book of the villas.

Herttoniemi was annexed to Helsinki in the Great annexation of Helsinki in 1946. The construction of new neighbourhoods was begun in the annexed areas, Herttoniemi being the first and biggest of these neighbourhoods. Myllypuro was originally part of Herttoniemi, but it was assigned to Vartiokylä, instead, in 1959.

The harbour and the oil depot in Herttoniemi were demolished in the 1990s and redeveloped into a residential area and marina called Herttoniemenranta.

Some fortifications of Krepost Sveaborg can be found in Herttoniemi, dating to World War I.

== Famous residents ==
- Swedish military architect Augustin Ehrensvärd whose life's work was building the fortress of Sveaborg owned the Herttoniemi manor in the area.
- Another famous owner of Herttoniemi manor was admiral Carl Olof Cronstedt, who had the existing building built and lived in the manor the last years of his life. A street in Herttoniemenranta called Amiraali Cronstedtin ranta is named after him.
- One of the most famous Finnish writers, the 1939 laureate of the Nobel Prize in Literature, Frans Eemil Sillanpää, lived in Herttoniemi.
- Arvo Turtiainen.
- President Tarja Halonen lived in Herttoniemi in her early childhood.

== Gallery ==
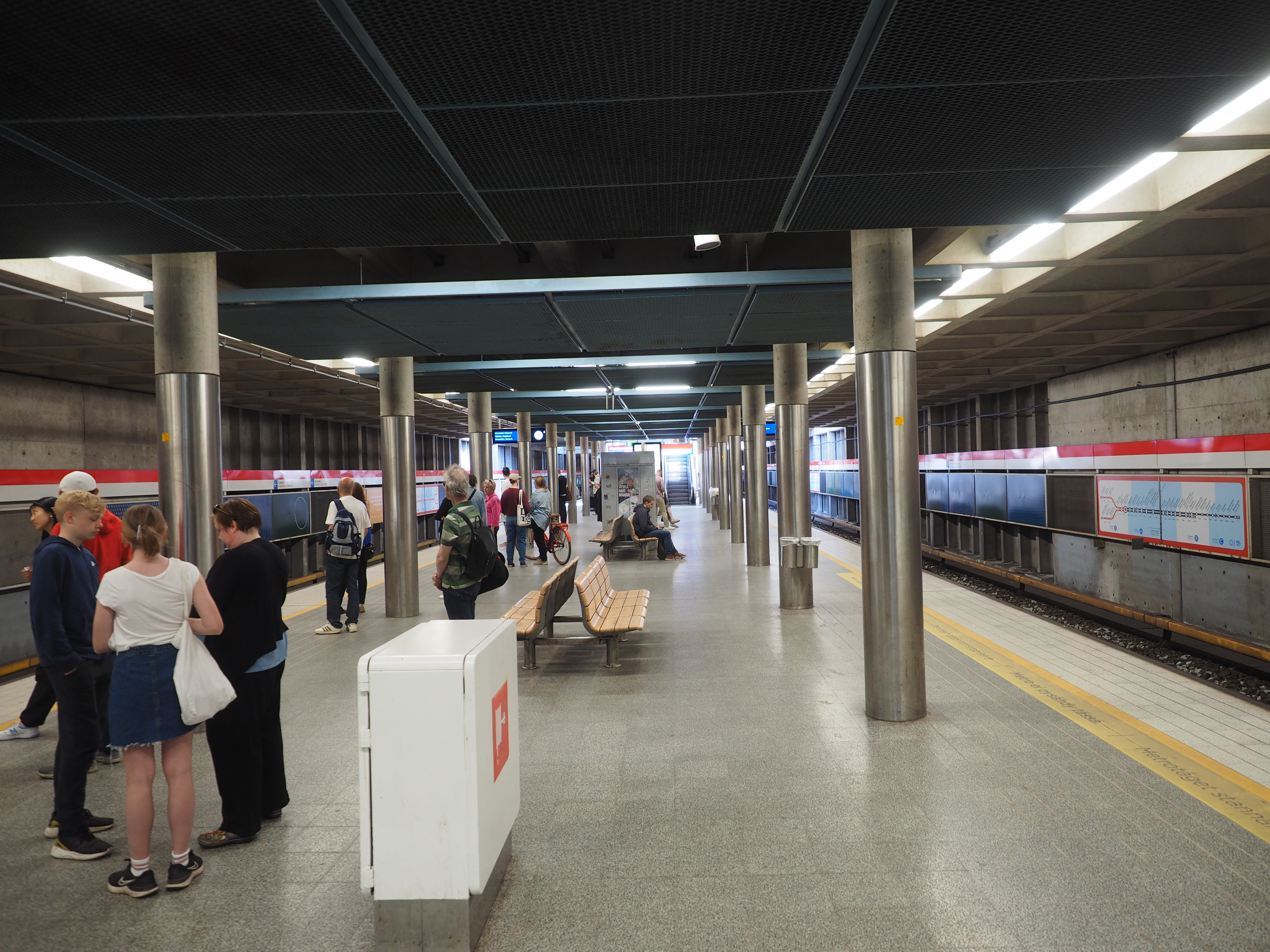
Herttoniemi metro station

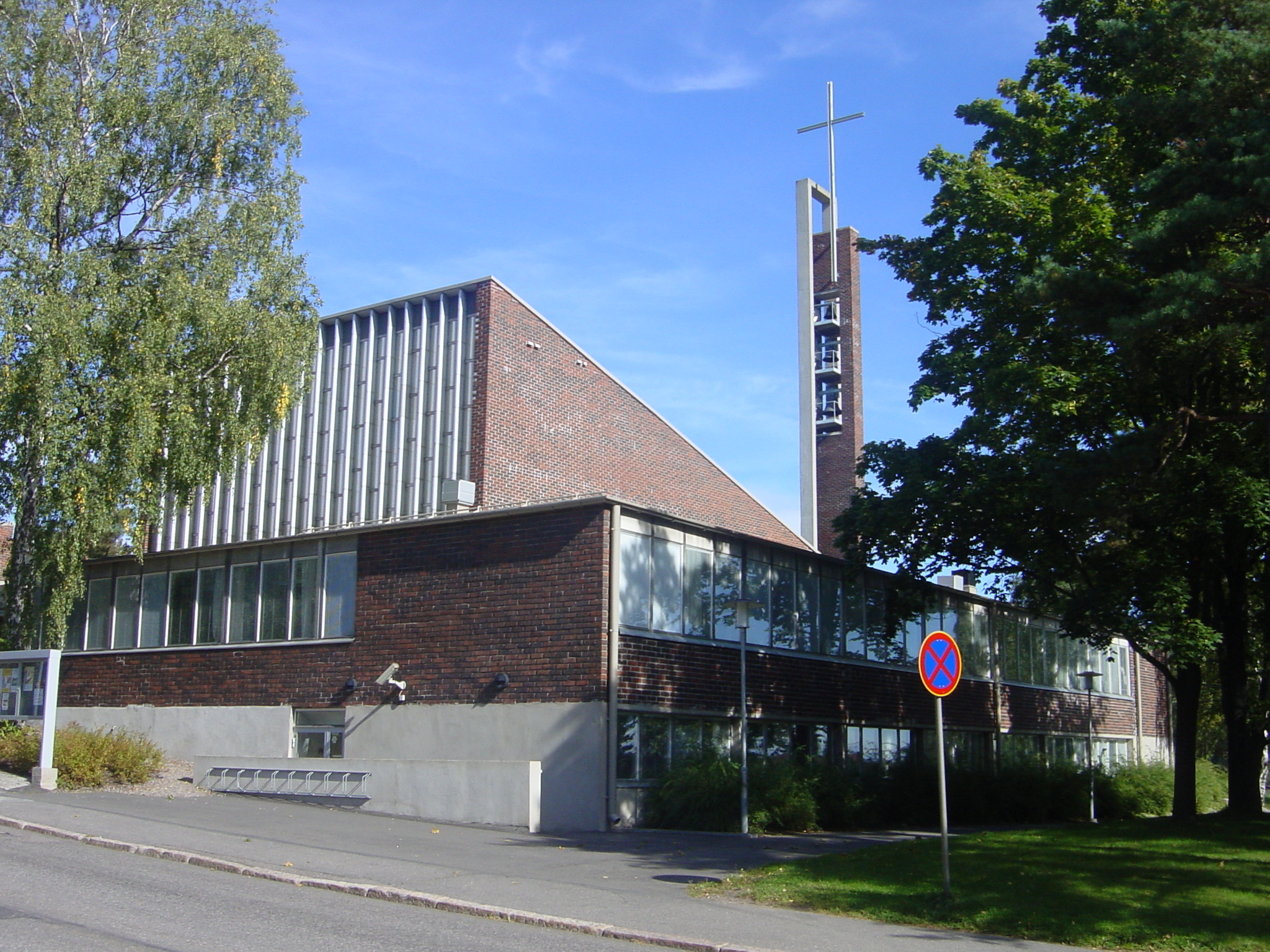
Herttoniemi church in Länsi-Herttoniemi

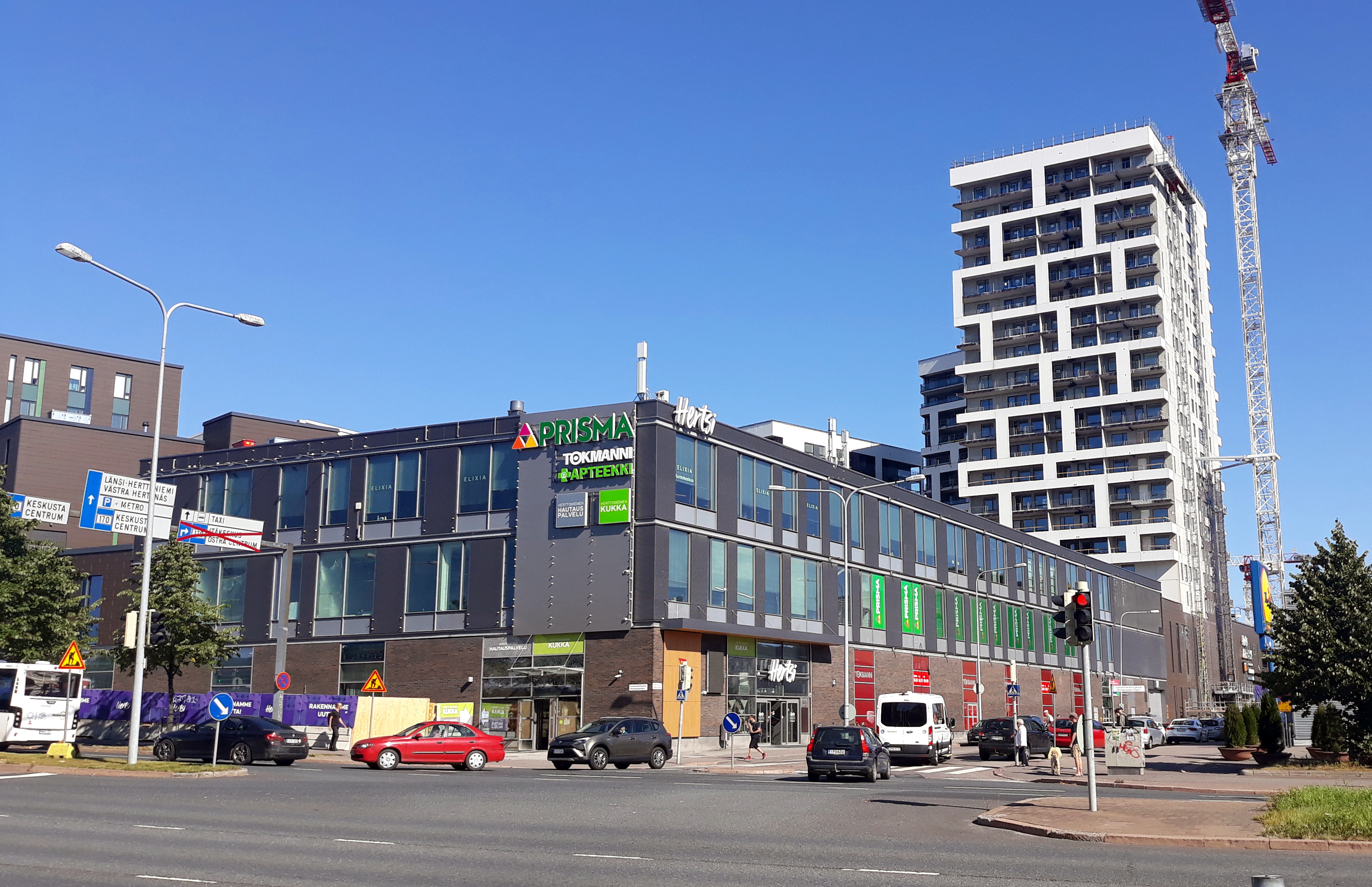
The Hertsi shopping center

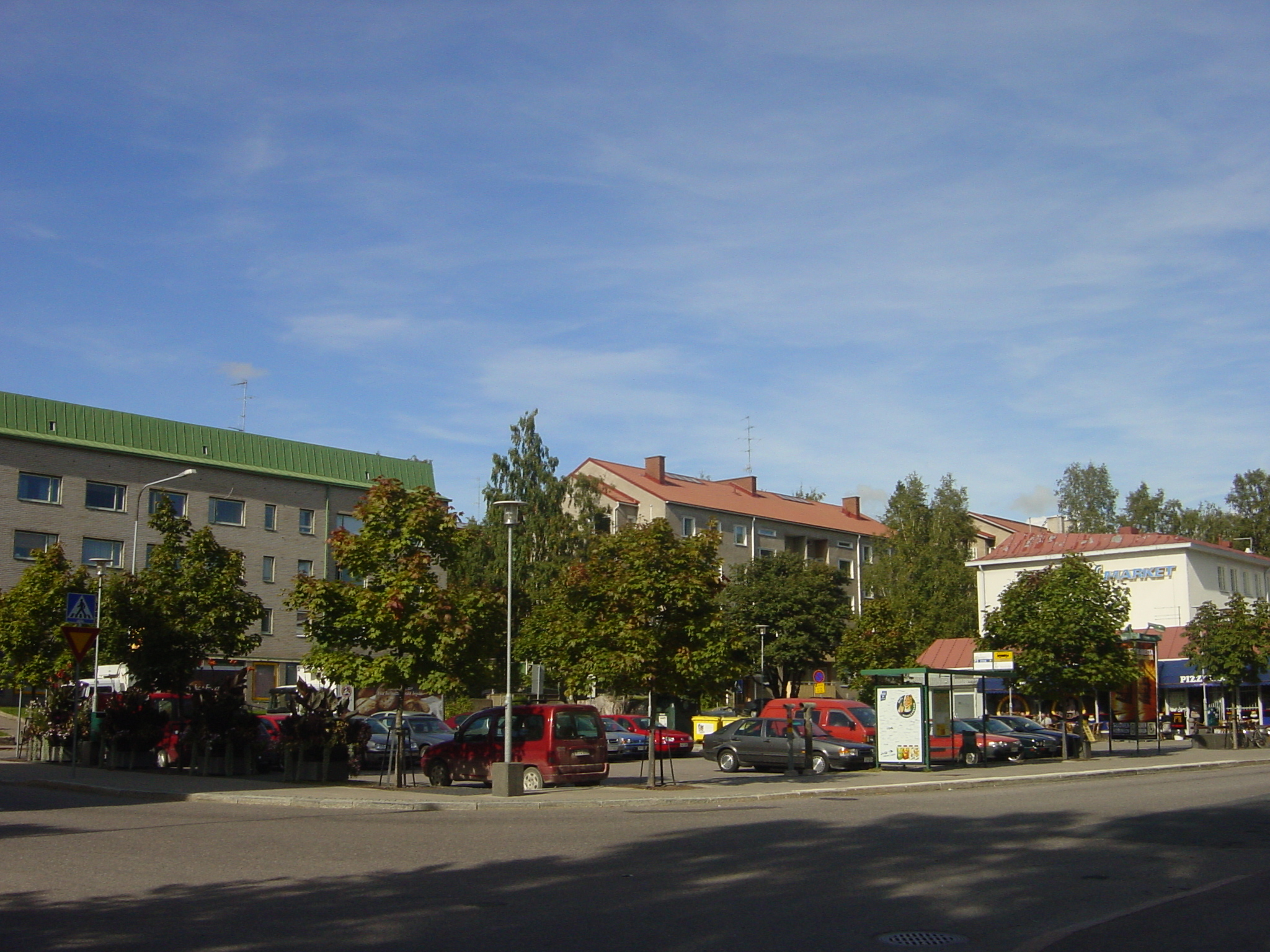
Eränkävijäntori, a square in Länsi-Herttoniemi

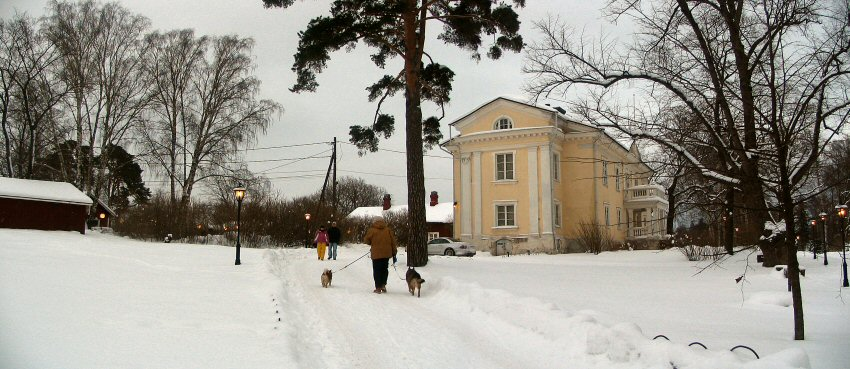
Herttoniemi manor built 1815

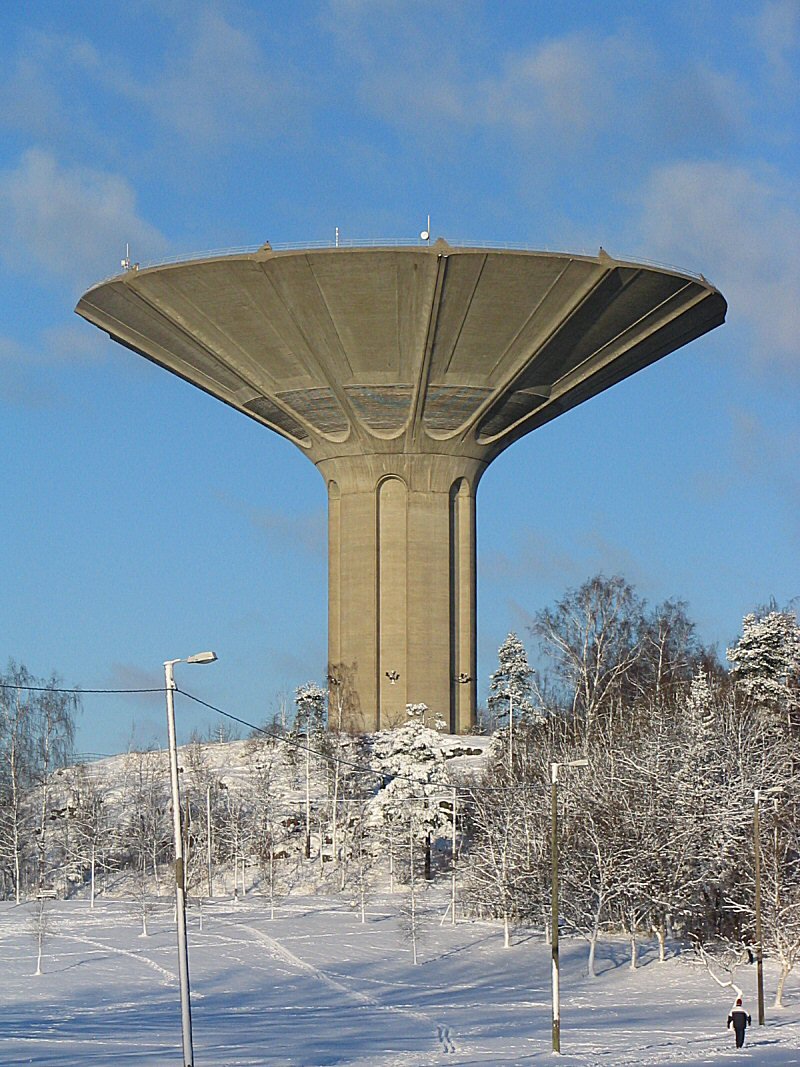
Roihuvuori water tower

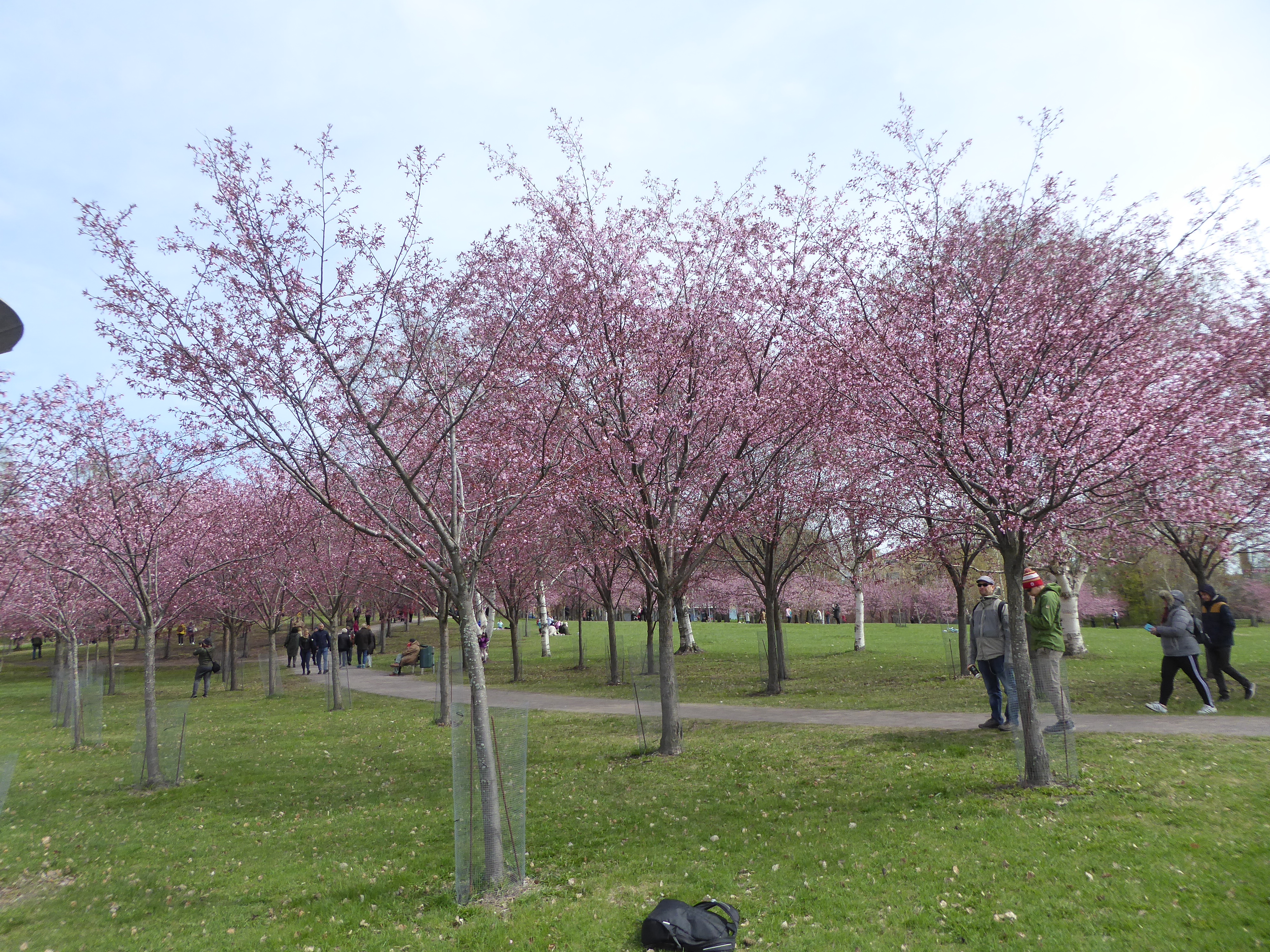
The Cherry Tree Park (Kirsikkapuisto) in Roihuvuori area

== Sources ==
- Olavi Terho et al. (ed.) (1970). Helsingin kadunnimet [‘Helsinki street names’. Publications of the City of Helsinki, 24]. Helsinki: City of Helsinki.

== See also ==
- Geography of Helsinki
