= Kirsikkapuisto =

Park in Helsinki, Finland

Kirsikkapuisto Körsbärsträdsparken Cherry Tree Park
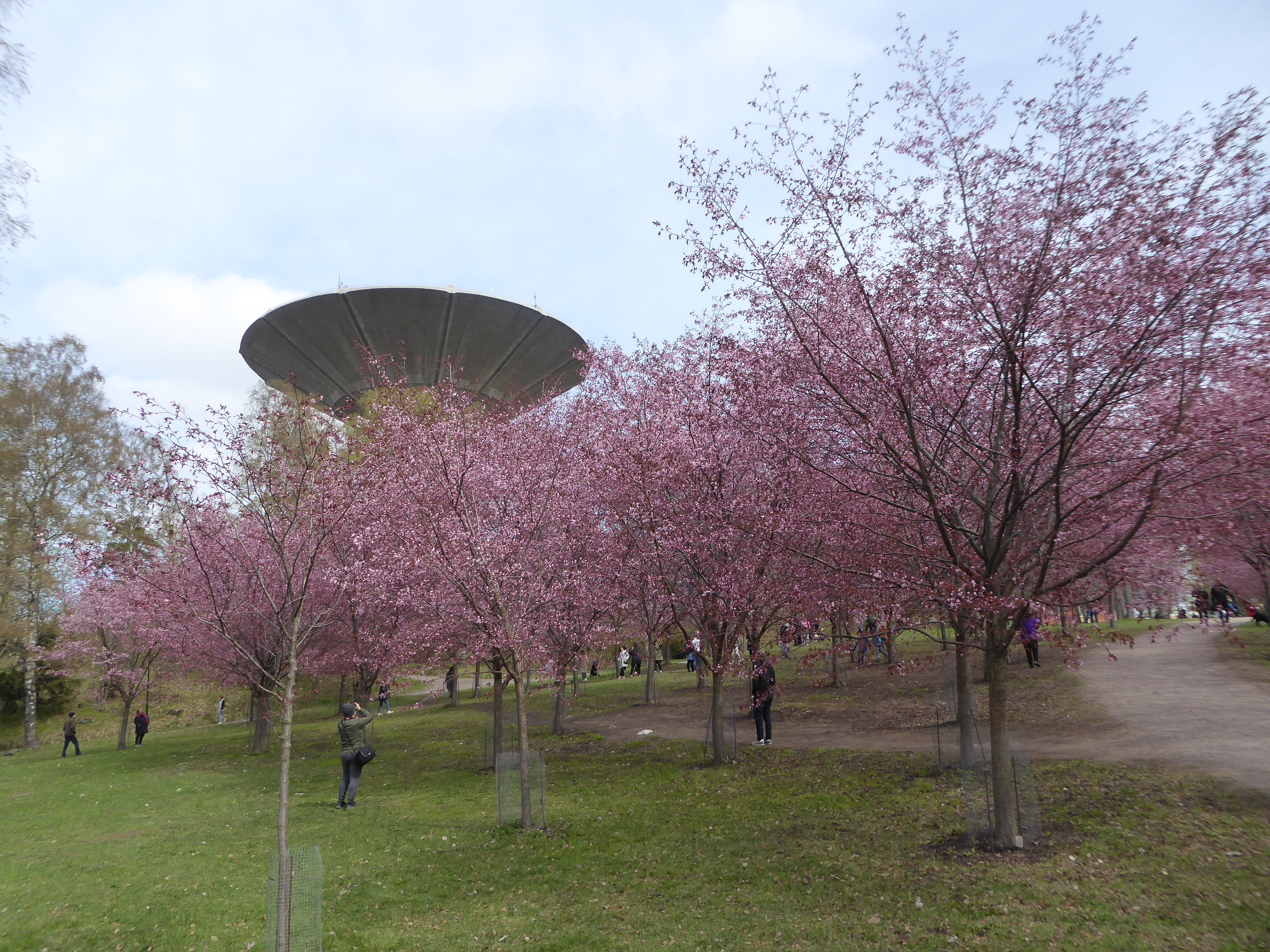
- Interactive map of Kirsikkapuisto; Körsbärsträdsparken; Cherry Tree Park
- Location: Sahaajankatu; 00820 Helsinki Finland
- Coordinates: 60°11′43″N 25°02′57″E
- Area: 57 242 m^{2}
- Operator: Helsinki Stara

Kirsikkapuisto (Finnish: [ˈkirsikːɑˌpui̯sto]; English: Cherry Tree Park, Swedish: Körsbärsträdsparken) opened in 2007 in the Roihuvuori district of Helsinki, and is part of the Roihuvuori green area. The southern area has a fenced off dog park. In the dog park are wooden statues of dogs and a tree with a cat in it. The city department that maintains these statues has now closed and the statues are being removed as they deteriorate. There are about 150 Cherry trees in the park that were planted following sponsorship from the Japanese community in Helsinki. In the Spring the Japanese festival of Hanami is celebrated when the trees blossom.

== Gallery ==
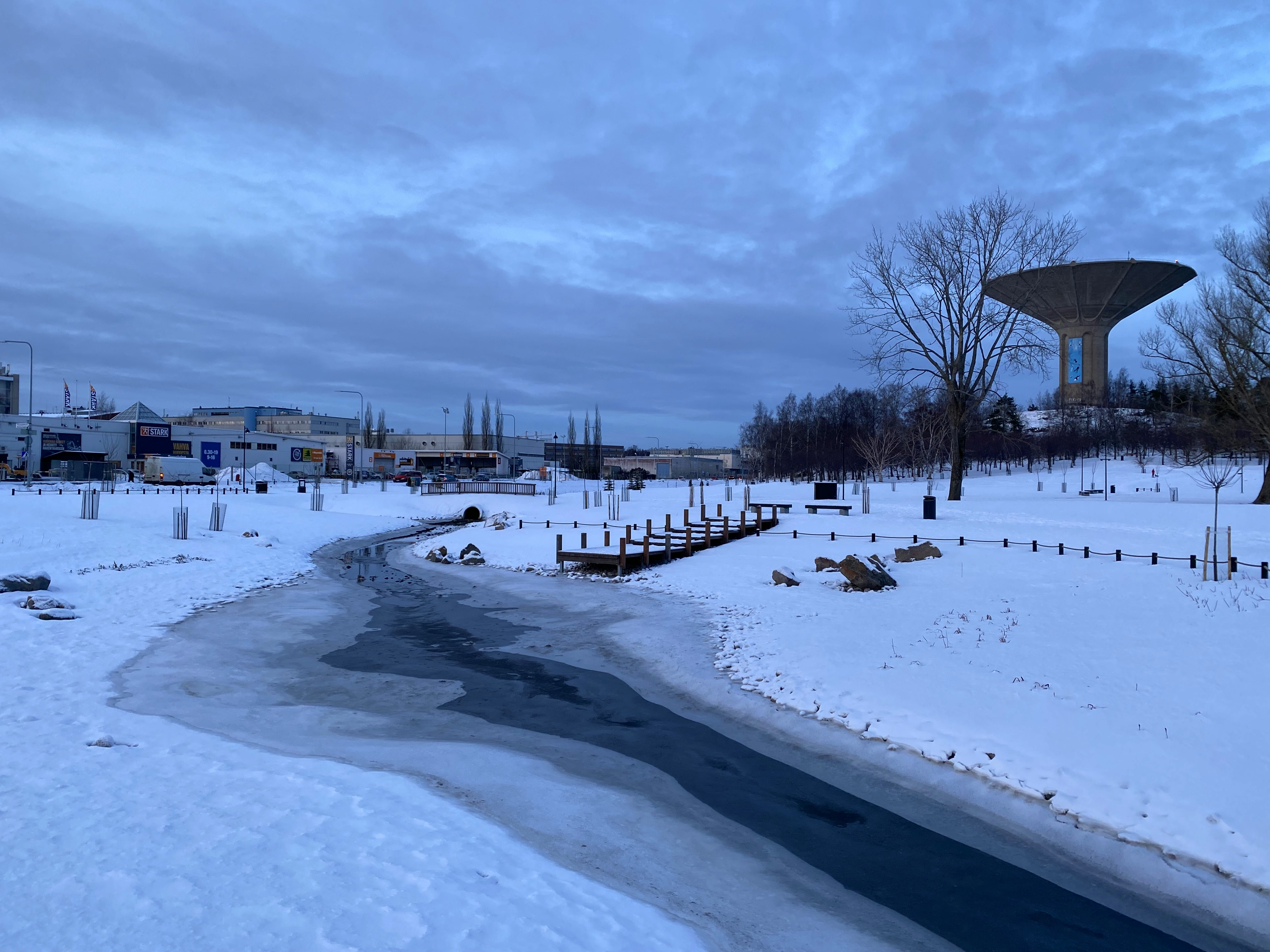
Kirsikkapuisto in Winter

Pedestrian street

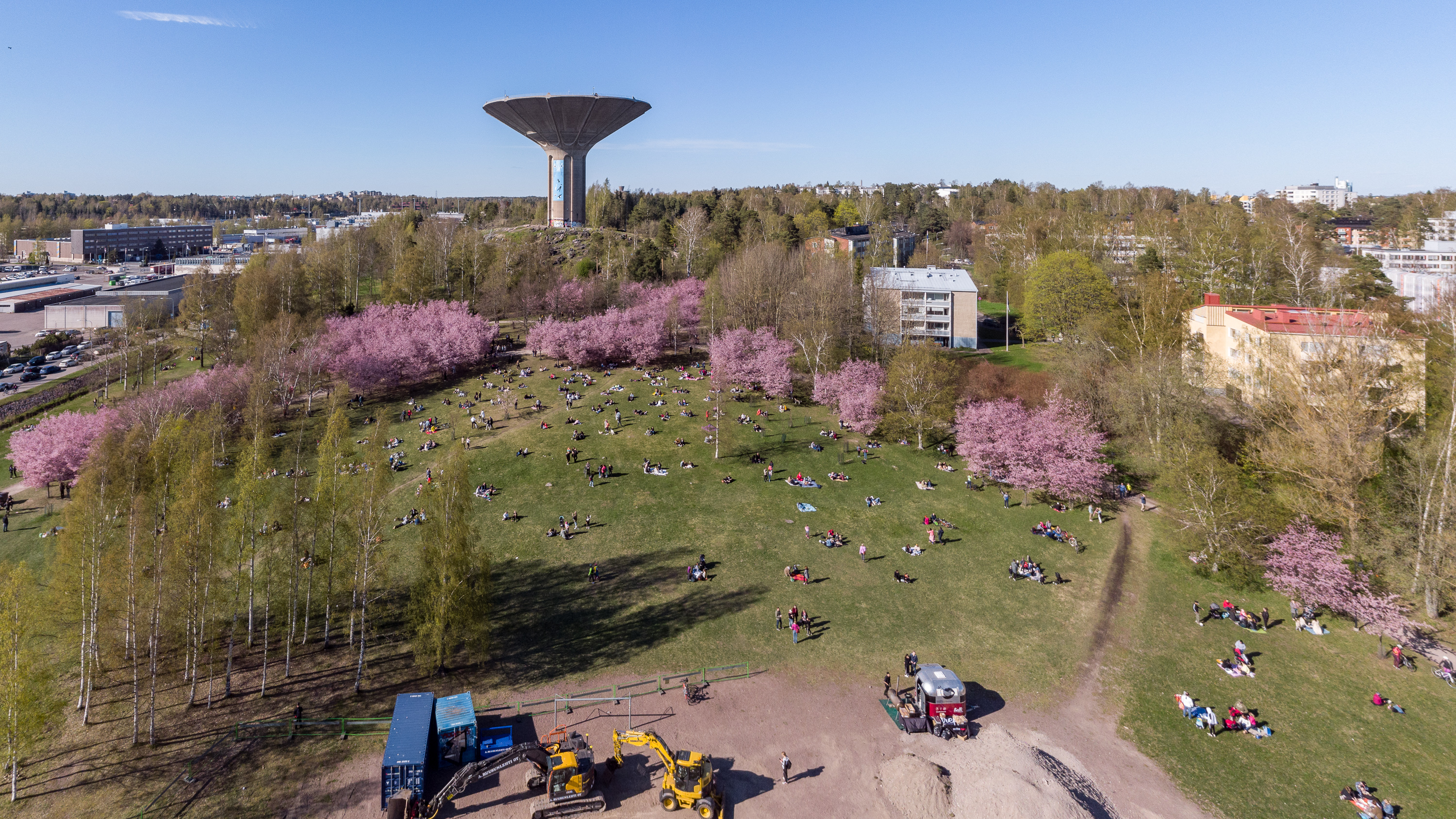
Aerial view

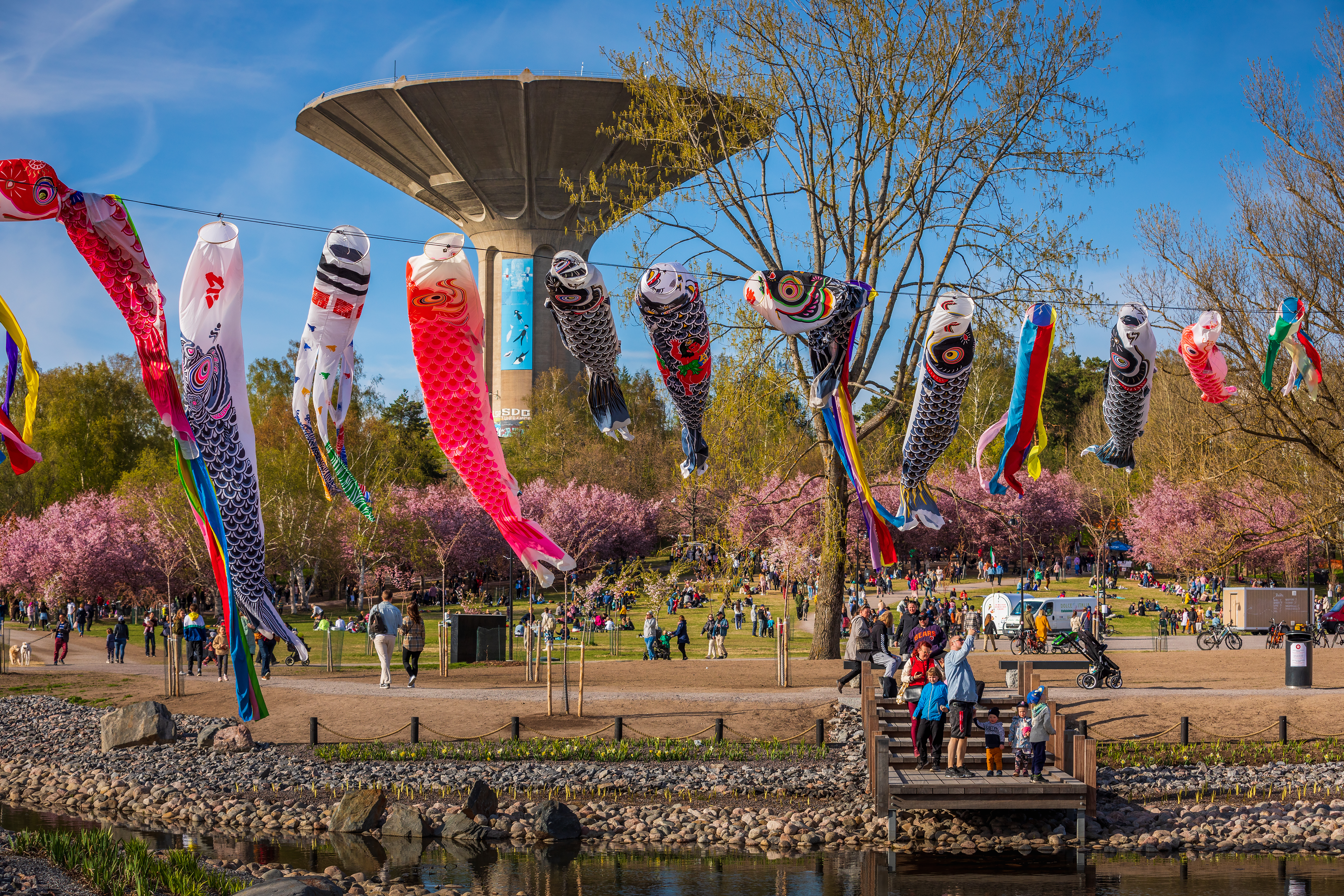
Kirsikkapuisto a few days after Hanami festival
