= Roihupelto =

Roihupelto (in Finnish) Kasåker (in Swedish)
- Neighborhood of Helsinki
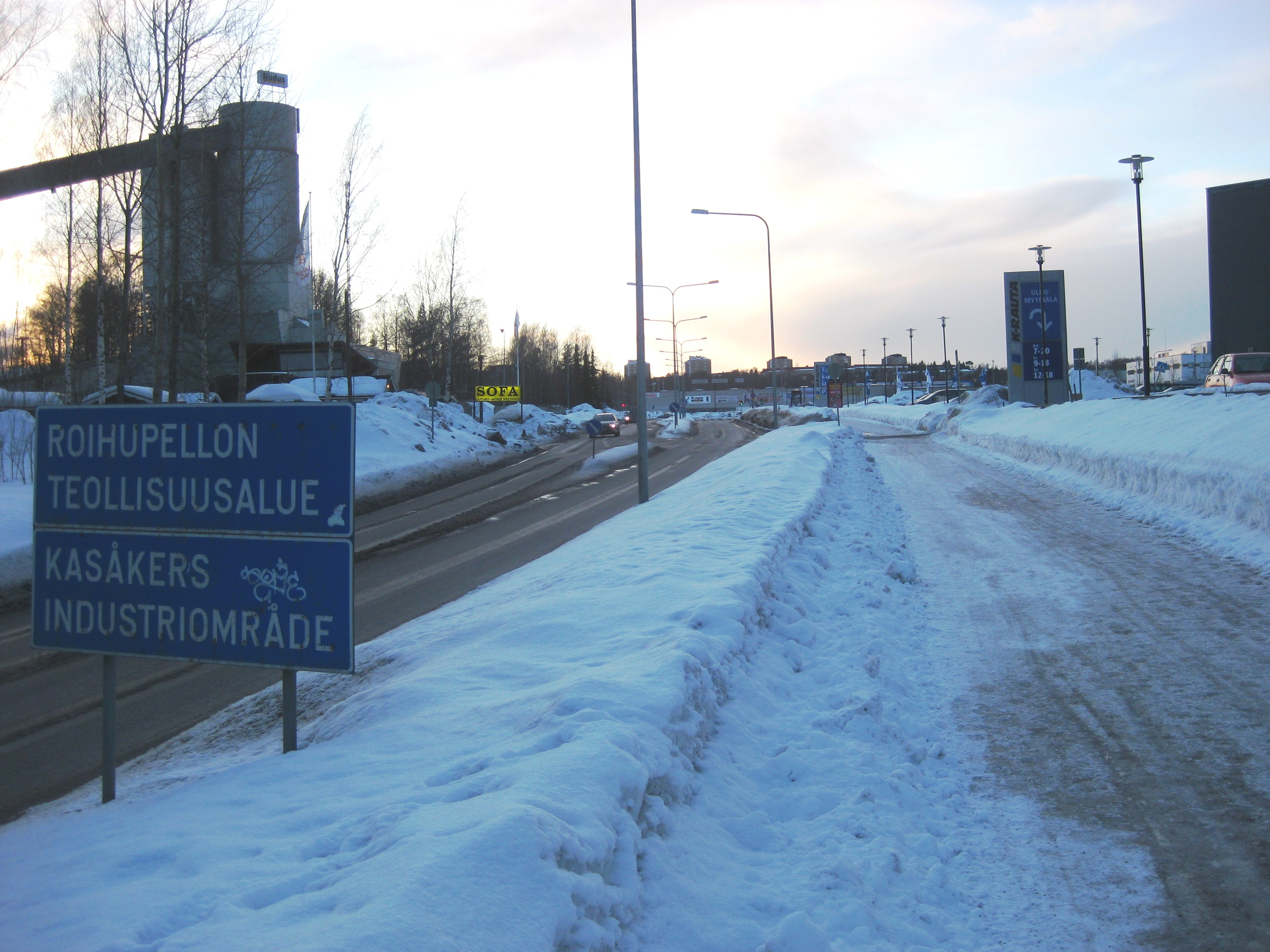
- Roihupellon teollisuusalue seen from east

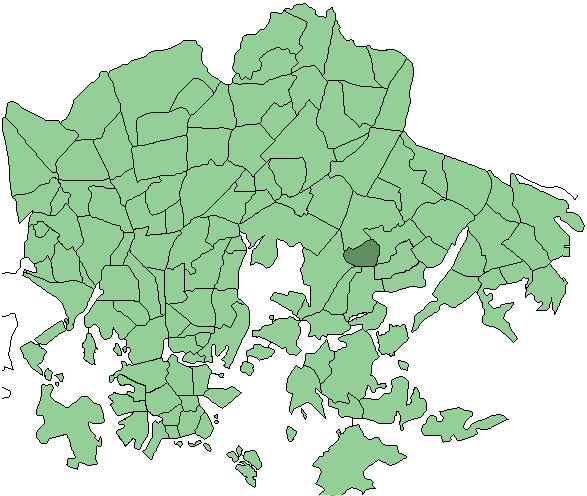
- Location in Helsinki
- Coordinates: 60.212465°N 25.057808°E
- Country: Finland
- Province: Southern Finland
- Region: Uusimaa
- Sub-region: Helsinki
- Time zone: UTC+2 (EET)
  - Summer (DST): UTC+3 (EEST)

Roihupelto (Finnish: [ˈroi̯huˌpelto]; Swedish: Kasåkern, literal translation Blaze Field) is a neighborhood in eastern Helsinki, Finland. It was previously called Roihupellon teollisuusalue (Kasåkers industriområde, Roihupelto industrial area). It is a largely industrial area with few inhabitants.
