= Vuosaari =

Area of East Helsinki in Uusimaa, Finland

Coordinates: 60°12′32″N 25°08′35″E

Vuosaari Nordsjö
- Helsinki Subdivision
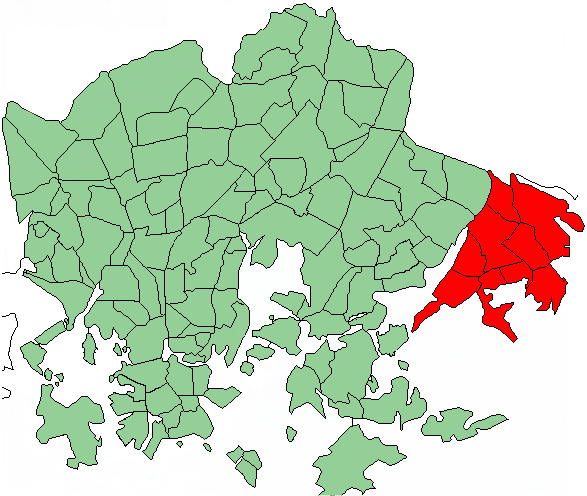
- Position of Vuosaari within Helsinki
- Country: Finland
- Region: Uusimaa
- Sub-region: Greater Helsinki
- Municipality: Helsinki
- District: Eastern
- Subdivision regions: Meri-Rastila, Rastila, Keski-Vuosaari, Mustavuori, Niinisaari, Nordsjön kartano, Aurinkolahti, Kallahti
- Area: 15.38 km^{2} (5.94 sq mi)
- Population (2020): 38 961
  - Density: 2,329/km^{2} (6,030/sq mi)
- Postal codes: 00960, 00980, 00990
- Subdivision number: 54
- Neighbouring subdivisions: Marjaniemi, Puotila, Vartioharju, Mellunmäki

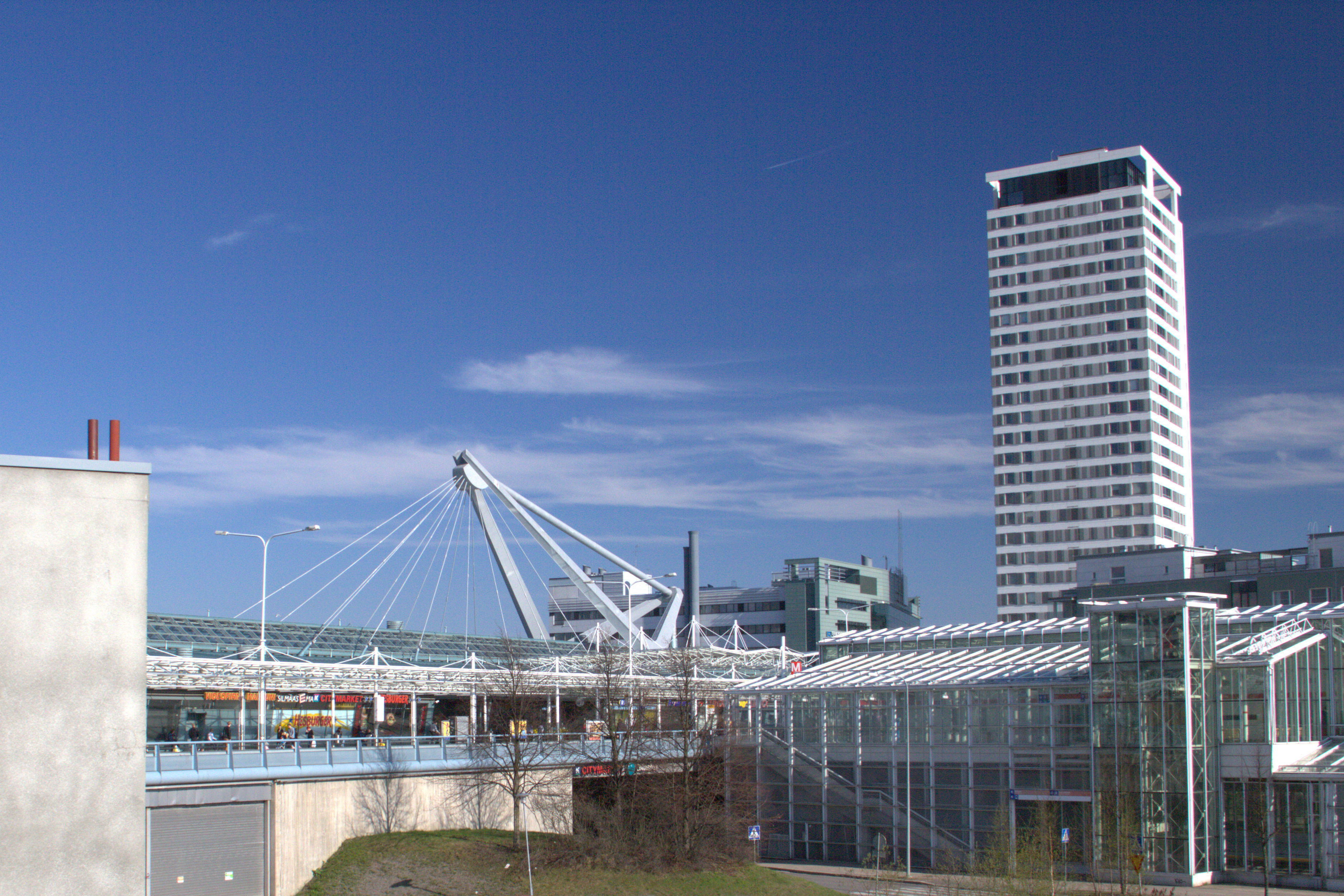
The centre of Vuosaari. The picture shows the Vuosaari metro station, the Columbus shopping centre and the Cirrus apartment building, one of the tallest apartment buildings in Finland.

Vuosaari (Swedish: Nordsjö) is a neighbourhood in the city of Helsinki, Finland. It is located by the sea in East Helsinki and with its area of 15.38 km^{2} (5.94 sq mi) is geographically the largest district in the city. It also has two Helsinki Metro stations, Rastila and Vuosaari

Vuosaari is one of the fastest-growing areas in Helsinki. The number of inhabitants has been increasing rapidly since early 1990s and it continues to grow as new residential areas are being built.

Among other things, Vuosaari is noted for its nature and large, relatively unspoilt recreational seashore areas. One of these is Uutela, a popular nature park located in the southeastern corner of Vuosaari. The continual planning of new residential zones has in fact raised criticism, as many people would rather preserve Vuosaari's closeness to nature.

Vuosaari is the location of a new major seaport in Helsinki, the Vuosaari Harbour.

As of 2005, 7.7% of the population of Vuosaari are foreign citizens and 11.6% were born outside of Finland. This has given the neighbourhood an overtly multi-cultural image in Finnish folklore, even though the percentage is higher in many other places in the Capital Region.

The two natural gas power plants of Helsingin Energia, the power utility of the city of Helsinki, are located in Vuosaari.

== Etymology ==
The original Swedish name of the area was Norsö, which can be translated as "string island". The word nor (nors in the genitive case) in the name properly means a string, but in this connection it is a geographical term, meaning a long and narrow flowing strait. Vuosaari was an island up to the 16th century, with this kind of a long and narrow strait separating it from the mainland. The middle part of the strait was so shallow that tectonic uplift has since caused it to become dry land, changing Vuosaari into a peninsula. The current bays of Vartiokylänlahti and Porvarinlahti are remnants of this ancient strait. During time, the name of the area also changed from Norsö to Nordsjö, as if referring to a northern sea. In maps from the early 20th century the area was sometimes marked with a Finnish name Pohjoisenmerenmaa ("Northern sea land"). In 1957 the Finnish name was confirmed as Vuosaari, referring to the original meaning of the Swedish name of the area.

== History ==
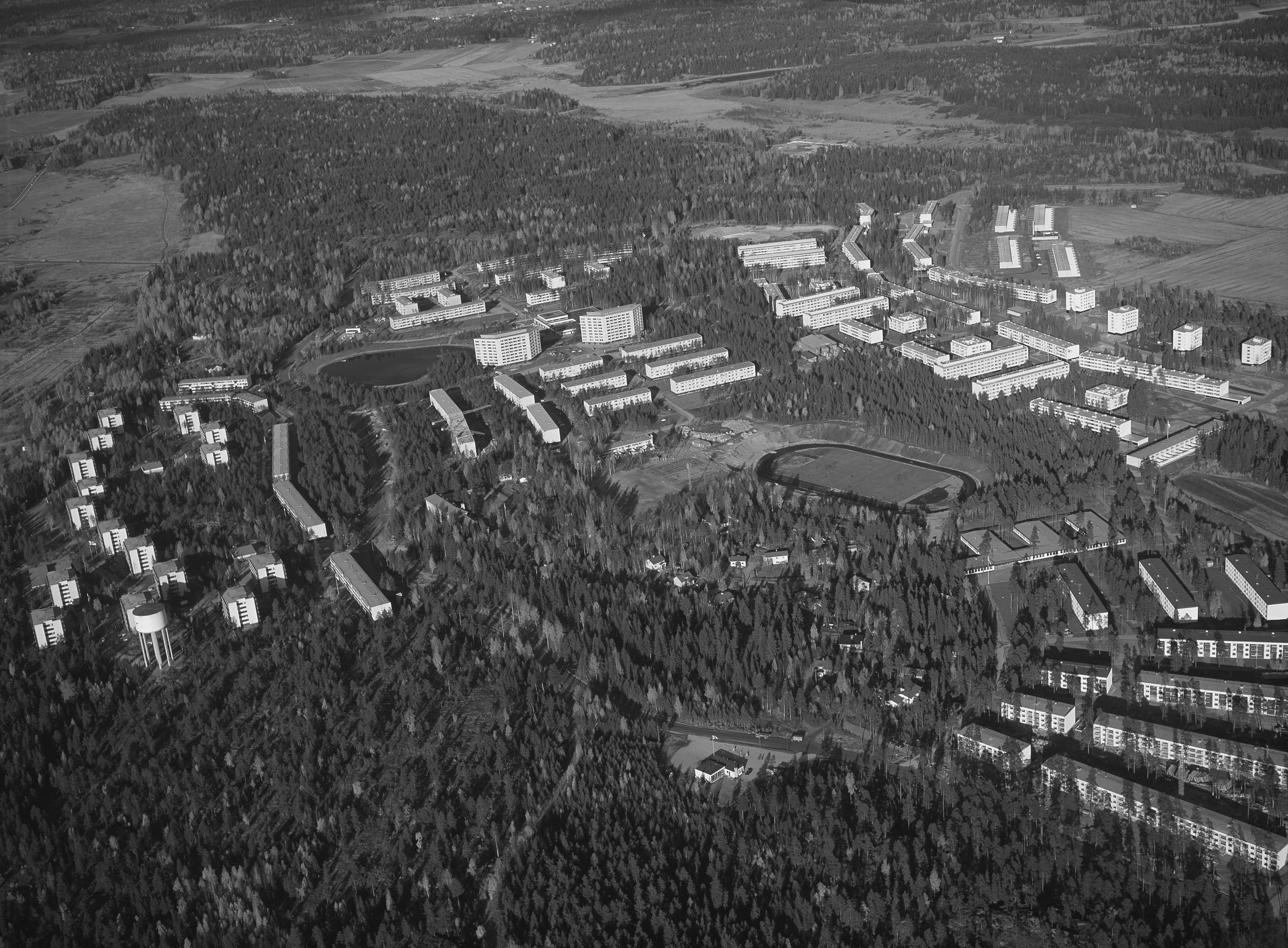
An aerial photograph to the north of Keski-Vuosaari in 1968. In the middle is the Vuosaari sports ground, to the left is Kangaslampi, in the front to the left is the Vuosaari water tower, later dismantled. The image shows a large number of apartment buildings that were new at the time.

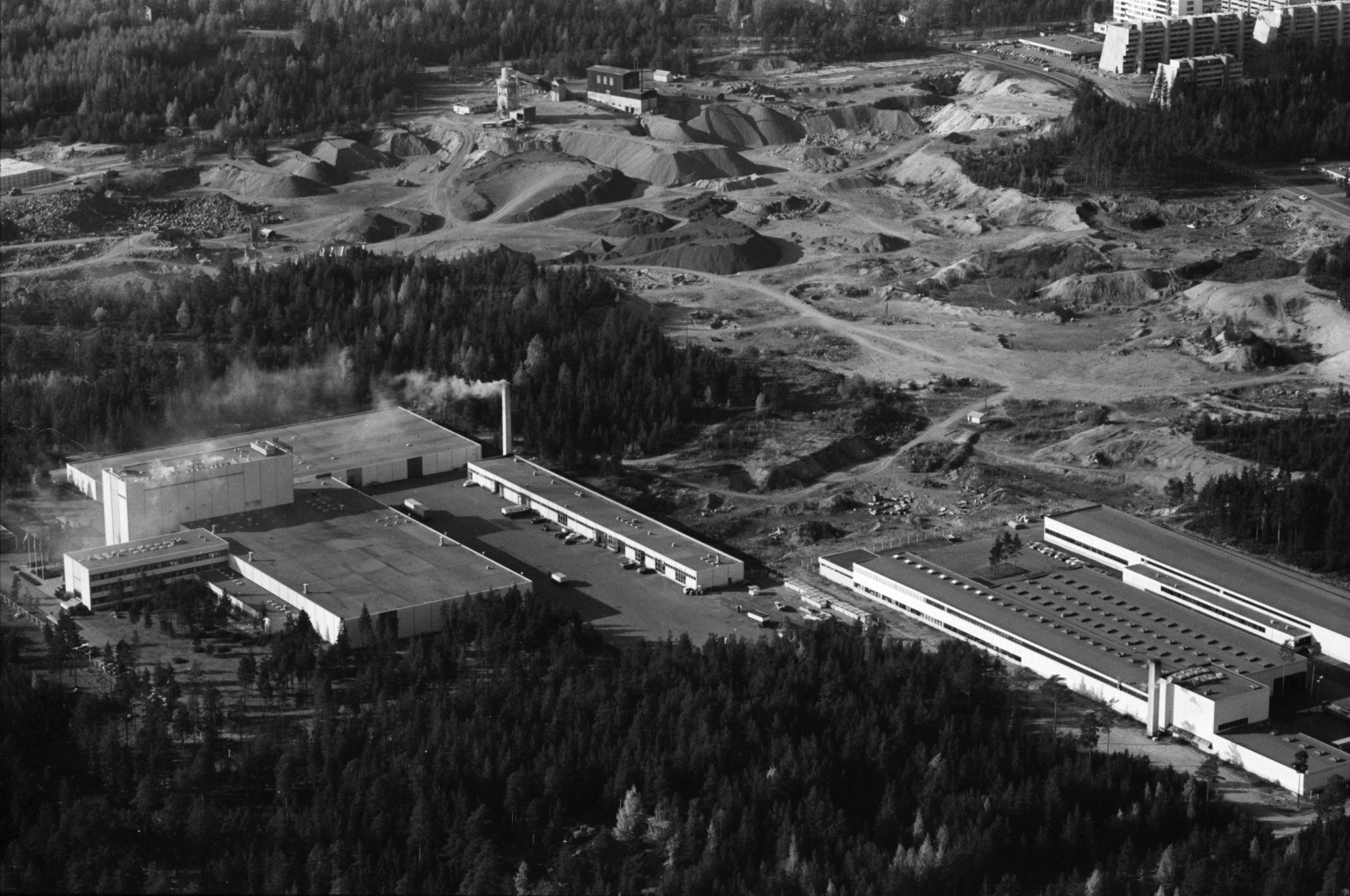
A diagonal aerial photograph to the northwest from the current site of the commercial centre of Vuosaari in 1970. In the front are industrial buildings belonging to Paulig, in the middle are sand pits belonging to Saseka. In the background are terraced houses along Ulappasaarentie built in the 1960s.

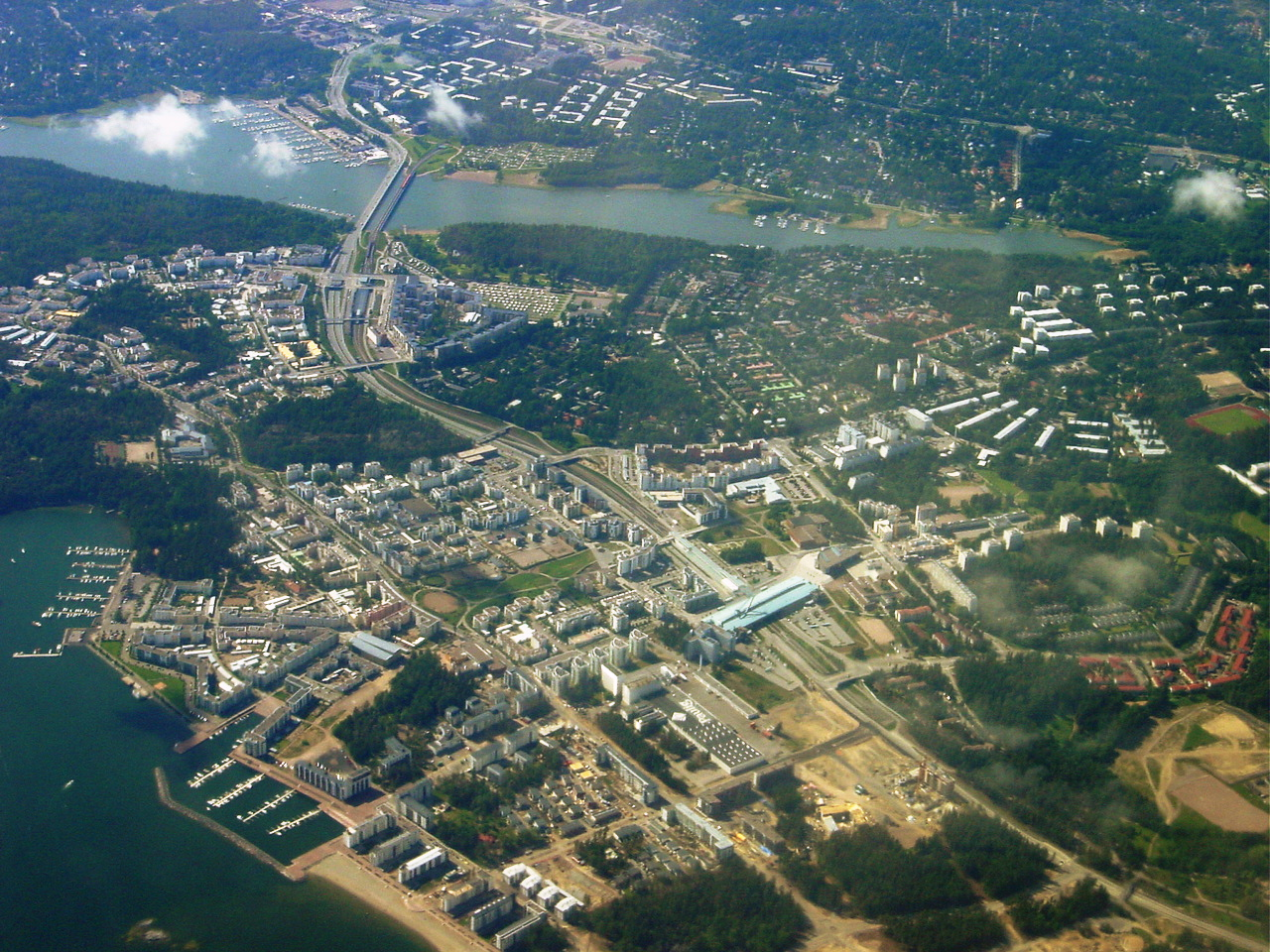
Vuosaari from the air in 2004

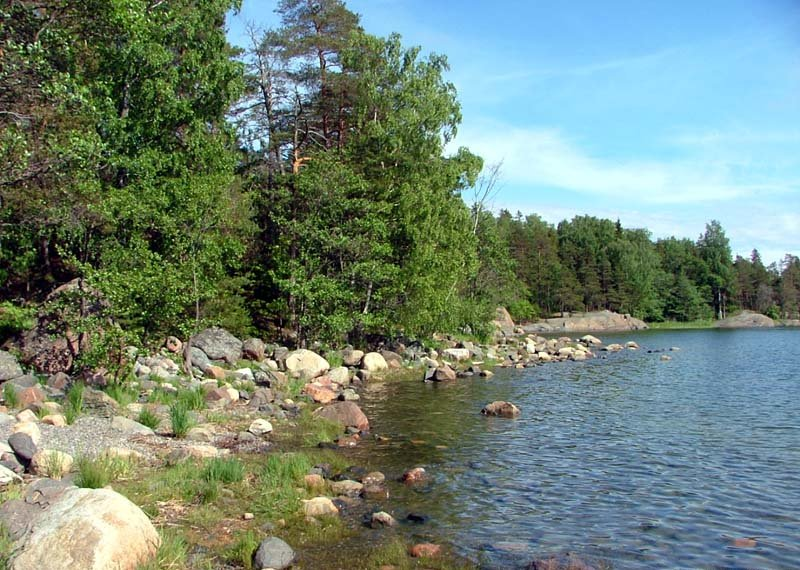
Uutela nature park

Vuosaari has been populated continuously since the Iron Age. In prehistoric times it was used as a fishing area by the Tavastians, but they did not live permantently in the area.

The first written record of the inhabitants of the area comes from a document dating back to Magnus IV of Sweden in the 14th century. During the Swedish colonisation of Finland in the Middle Ages Vuosaari received Swedish inhabitants either directly from Sweden or through Länsisalmi.

By the 16th century, Vuosaari had regained its connection to the mainland and the former island had two Rustholl mansions, Nordsjö and Rastböle respectively, formed from the numerous farmsteads in the area, several small villages and a military shipyard. Officers from Suomenlinna built houses on the peninsulas. This process was further amplified after a regular steam boat connection between Helsinki and Vuosaari was established in the 19th century.

Villa inhabitation in Vuosaari increased in the 1880s when steamship traffic to the area started. The areas of Kallahdenniemi and Ramsinniemi got their first villas in the early 20th century. Vuosaari was a Swedish-speaking agricultural area up to the 1930s, when the company Saseka started industrial production near the current residential area of Kallahti. Saseka produced Kahi calcium silicate bricks and Siporex light concrete. Production of these materials in Vuosaari ended in 1978 when the production moved to Ikaalinen.

Of military historical interest is that Russians built fortifications in Vuosaari during the First World War in 1917. During the Second World War, Vuosaari was used as a decoy Helsinki to divert the bombs away from the city. This was done by lighting bonfires and concentrating anti-aircraft guns on the island. The bombing of Helsinki lasted three nights, and in the end, only four percent of the bombs had actually hit their intended target in Helsinki.

Later, during the fast construction phase in the 1990s, the diversion of Soviet bombers led to halts on building sites, as unexploded aerial bombs were discovered hidden in the ground.

After the war, most of the lands in Vuosaari were owned by Oy Saseka Ab, a brick and stone company that had its factory on the island. Big lots of underdeveloped land at a close proximity to the capital prompted Saseka to start a zoning and building process to increase the value of land there. The Asuntosäästäjät Union (lit. apartment-savers) started to build houses in the 1960s, thus creating what colloquially is now known as Old Vuosaari. Some of Finland's most famous architects participated in the planning, most notably Viljo Revell. Vuosaari was incorporated into Helsinki from the Helsinki rural municipality, now known as Vantaa, on 1 January 1966. At that time the majority of apartment buildings in Keski-Vuosaari had already been built. The rural municipality agreed to the transfer, as the joint board of the city and the rural municipality thought the rural municipality could not afford the construction of the infrastructure needed by the rapidly growing inhabitation. The Vuosaari bridge was built in July 1966, decreasing the travel time from Vuosaari to the city centre. There was a dumping ground at Vuosaarenhuippu in the northern part of Vuosaari from the middle 1960s to the late 1980s. A Valmet dock was built in the place of the current Vuosaari harbour in the 1970s, which was active in Vuosaari until 1987. The Rastila camping site was opened in 1971.

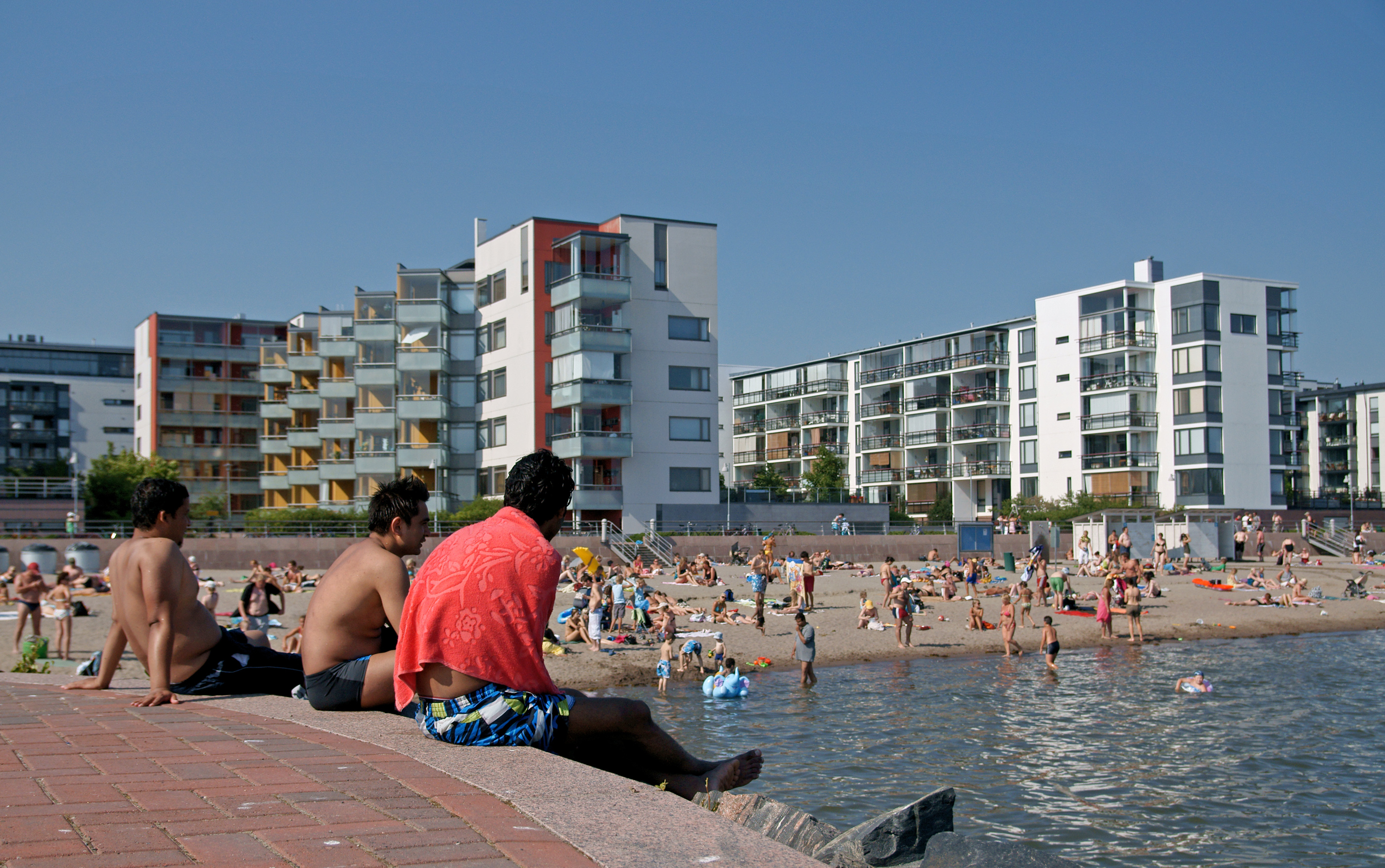
Aurinkolahti Beach in Vuosaari

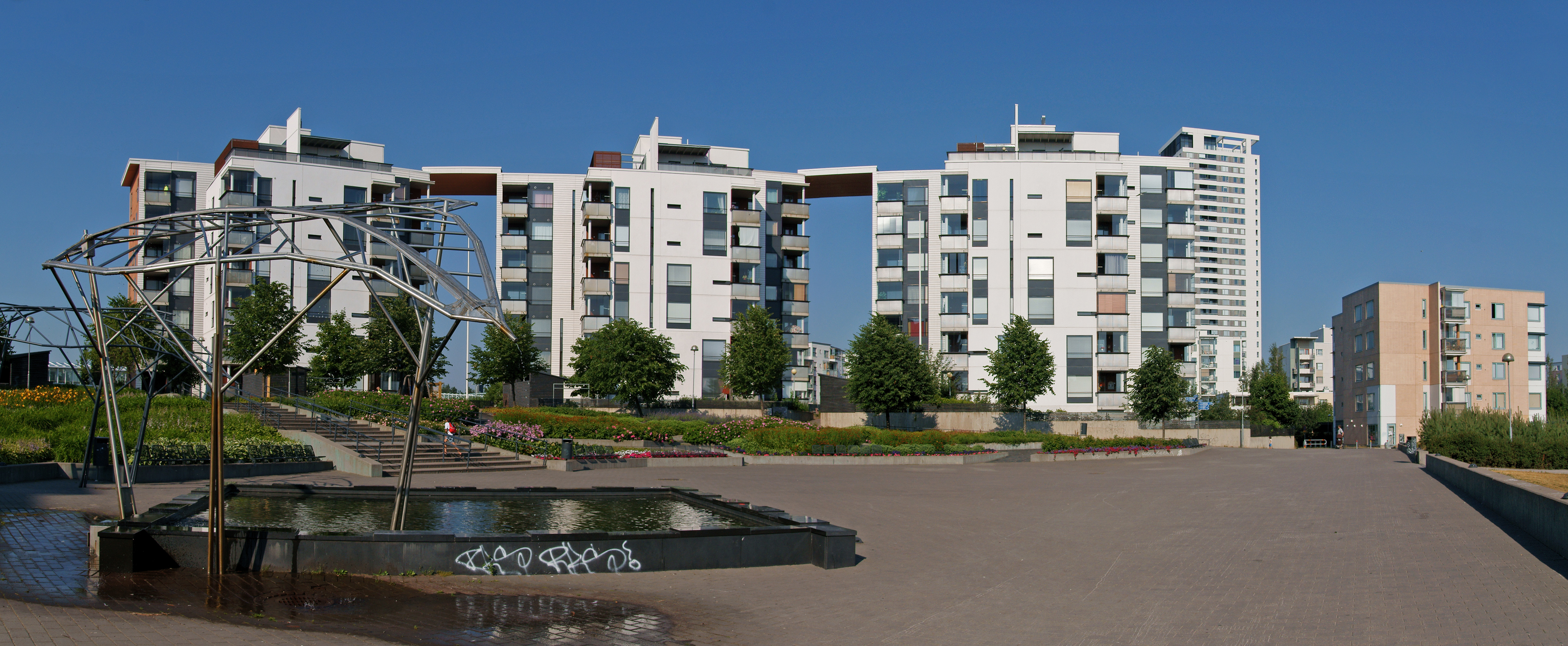
New residential buildings near the centre of Vuosaari

In the early 1970s the population of Vuosaari reached 15 thousand. After this, the increase in population stopped for almost 20 years. The population of Vuosaari has since increased again because of the new construction in the early 1990s. The residential areas of Kallahti, Meri-Rastila and Aurinkolahti were formed in eastern Vuosaari. In the middle 1990s the commercial centre of the district moved to the Columbus shopping centre between Keski-Vuosaari and Kallahti. The extension of the Helsinki Metro to the Vuosaari metro station was opened for passenger transport on 31 August 1998. The opening ceremony was attended by President of Finland Martti Ahtisaari with his wife Eeva.

As the first real influx of refugees and immigrants to Helsinki coincided with the building of Meri-Rastila in the beginning of the 1990s, the quarter quickly became home to an above average population of recent immigrants by Finnish standards. Russians, Estonians, Kurds and Somalis still form the basis of the immigrant population there - some 11% of the total population. The main street in Meri-Rastila became colloquially known as Mogadishu Avenue, which subsequently became the title of a Finnish television series that sought to deal with the intercultural differences between immigrants and native Finns from a comic point of view.

In 2006 Vuosaari had about 34 thousand inhabitants and it is estimated to have about 40 thousand inhabitants in the middle 2020s. The Cirrus high-rise building built to the south of the shopping centre was the tallest residential building in Finland at the time of its completion. The cargo harbour activity in Helsinki moved from the city centre in Vuosaari when the Vuosaari Harbour was taken into use in 2008.

Aku Louhimies's 2012 film is named after the district.

== Geography and nature ==
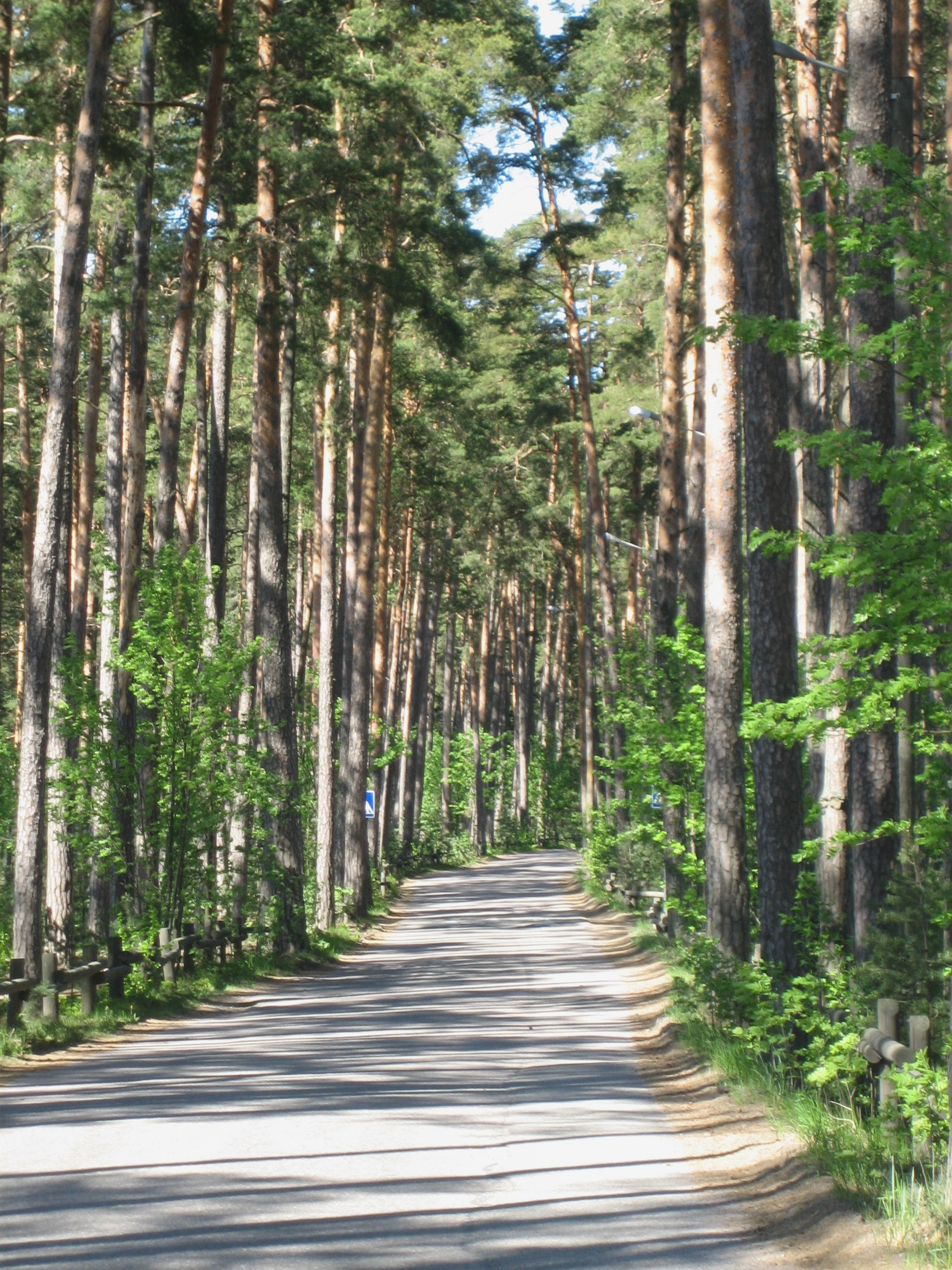
A road leading to Kallahdenniemi surrounded by pine forest in Kallahdenharju.

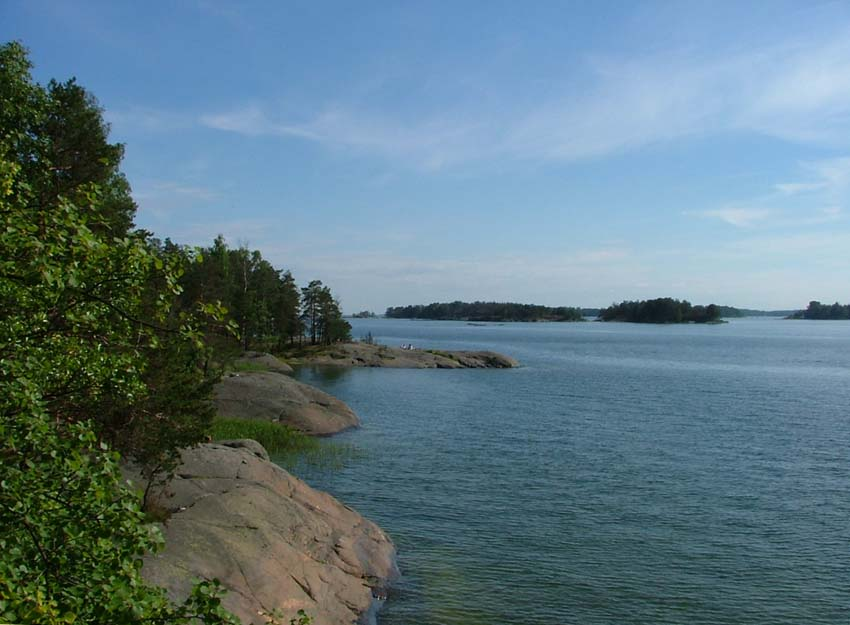
A view of the beach cliffs in Uutela in June 2004.

Vuosaari is a peninsula on the shore of the Gulf of Finland, with an area of 17 square kilometres. There are many large greenspaces on both the northern and the southern parts of the area. The district also includes numerous small islands in front of the peninsula, such as Pikku Niinisaari, Iso Villasaari and Kalliosaari. The Vartiokylänlahti bay to the west of Vuosaari and the Porvarinlahti bay to the north are remnants of an ancient strait which has dried up because of tectonic uplift. The Kangaslampi lake, about a hectare in size, is located in the northern part of Keski-Vuosaari and is one of the few lakes located inside Helsinki. The soil in the middle of Vuosaari is mostly made of sand, whereas the lands in the eastern and western parts are made of till, cliffs and clay at some parts. The dominant mineral in the bedrock is gneiss, but there are also more rare minerals in the area, such as gabbro and pillow lava formed from ancient undersea volcanic activity.

There are three peninsulas reaching out to the Gulf of Finland in the southern part of Vuosaari: the oblong peninsulas of Ramsinniemi and Kallahdenniemi and the wider and rounder Uutela. Of these, Kallahdenniemi is an esker populated with pine forest, formed about 12 thousand years ago by melting waters from flowing glaciers. It continues underneath the sea as sandbanks and a sandy bottom, and its highest undersea parts form islands such as Santinen and Iso Leikosaari. Kallahdenharju is a nature preservation area, similarly to the multi-species grove forest located in Ramsinniemi. In the western part of Meri-Rastila is a forest area consisting of many forest types and an ancient shingle beach formed of ancient beach rocks. The Uutela area has many kinds of forests, beach cliffs, traditional biotopes and the Särkkäniemi nature preservation area. As well as Kallahdenniemi, the areas of Rastila and Aurinkolahti also have sandy beaches.

The area of Mustavuori is located in the northern part of Vuosaari, just next to the border to the neighbouring city of Vantaa. A large part of Mustavuori is also a nature preservation area, including the most valuable grove area in the Helsinki capital region with many rare plant species and Porvarinlahti which is significant as a bird-watching area. The 65-metre high hill Vuosaarenhuippu has formed from reclaimed land and is located in Niinisaari in the place of an old dumping ground. It includes many rare plant and animal species. There is a flat giant's kettle between Mustavuori and Niinisaari, and Vuosaarenhuippu has formed partly attached to a drumlin.

== Population ==
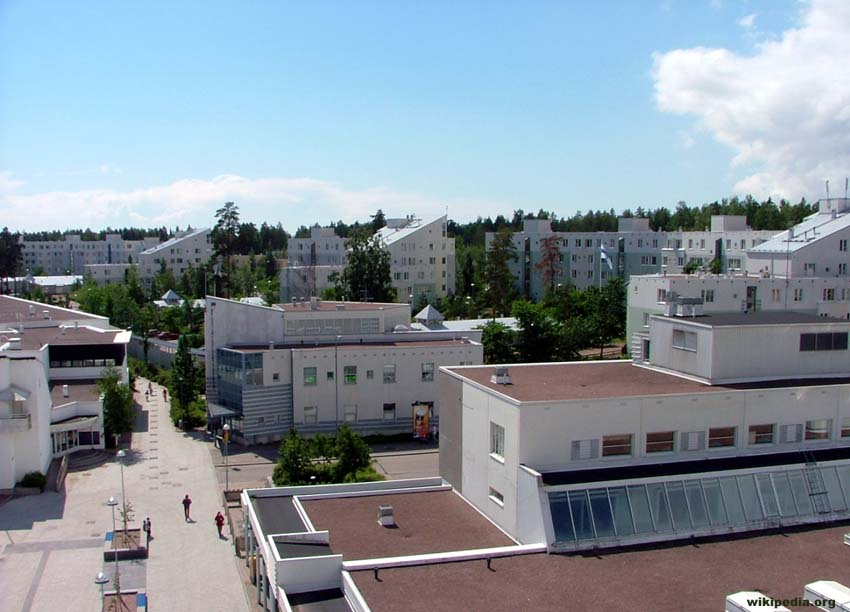
A view of the Meri-Rastila area.

In late 2020 Vuosaari had 38,961 inhabitants. The population is mostly concentrated on the southern, central and western parts of the area. Finnish and Sámi language speakers comprised 68,7 %, Swedish speakers 4,5 % of the population. People speaking foreign languages comprised 26,8 % of the population, which is notably higher than that of Helsinki in average (15.7% on 31 December 2018). About a quarter of the inhabitants in Vuosaari come from a foreign background (almost 40% in the Kallahti and Meri-Rastila areas), which is also notably higher than that in Helsinki in average. 17.9% of the inhabitants in Vuosaari were under 16 years old and 18.5% were over 65 years old (31 December 2018). About 45.9% of the apartments in Vuosaari are rental apartments, which is slightly lower than that in Helsinki in average (47.1% on 31 December 2018).

In comparison to the population, Vuosaari has quite few jobs, only slightly more than 6500 (31 December 2017), because Vuosaari has a large numbers of daily commute traffic to other parts of the city. The unemployment rate in 2018 was 13.1%, which is higher than that in Helsinki in average (9.2%), also the number of people on welfare in the same year was high (17.5% compared to 10.4% in Helsinki in average). The income level in Kallahti and Meri-Rastila was among the lowest in Helsinki in 2014, whereas the average income in Aurinkolahti is higher than that in the rest of Vuosaari, comparable to that in Töölö and Lauttasaari.

The district of Vuosaari forms its own congregation in the Evangelical Lutheran Church of Finland. In 2019 46.4% of the inhabitants in Vuosaari belonged to the congregation. The Orthodox Church of Finland has a congregation in Helsinki, which is also active in Vuosaari.

== Buildings ==
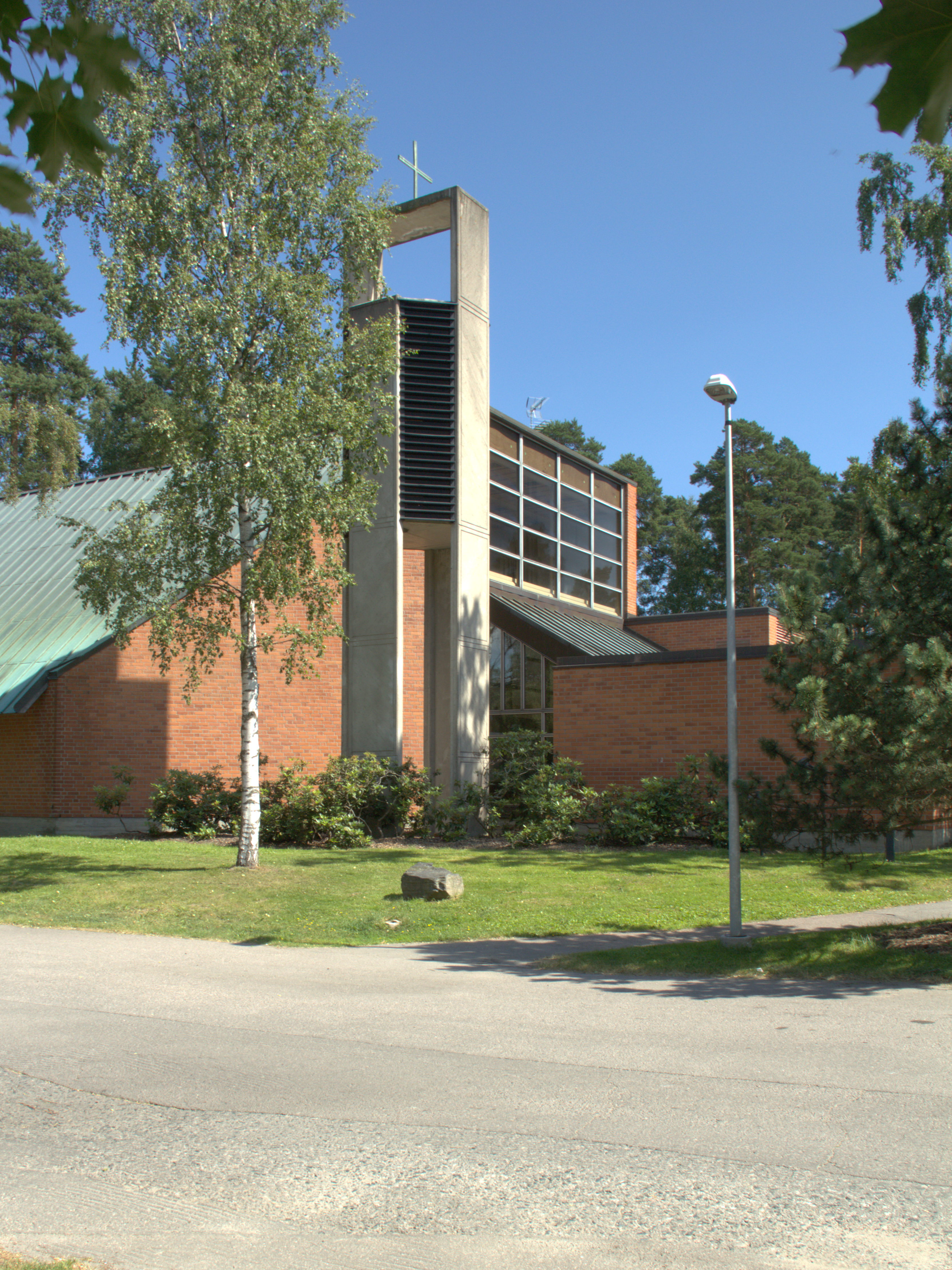
The Vuosaari church.

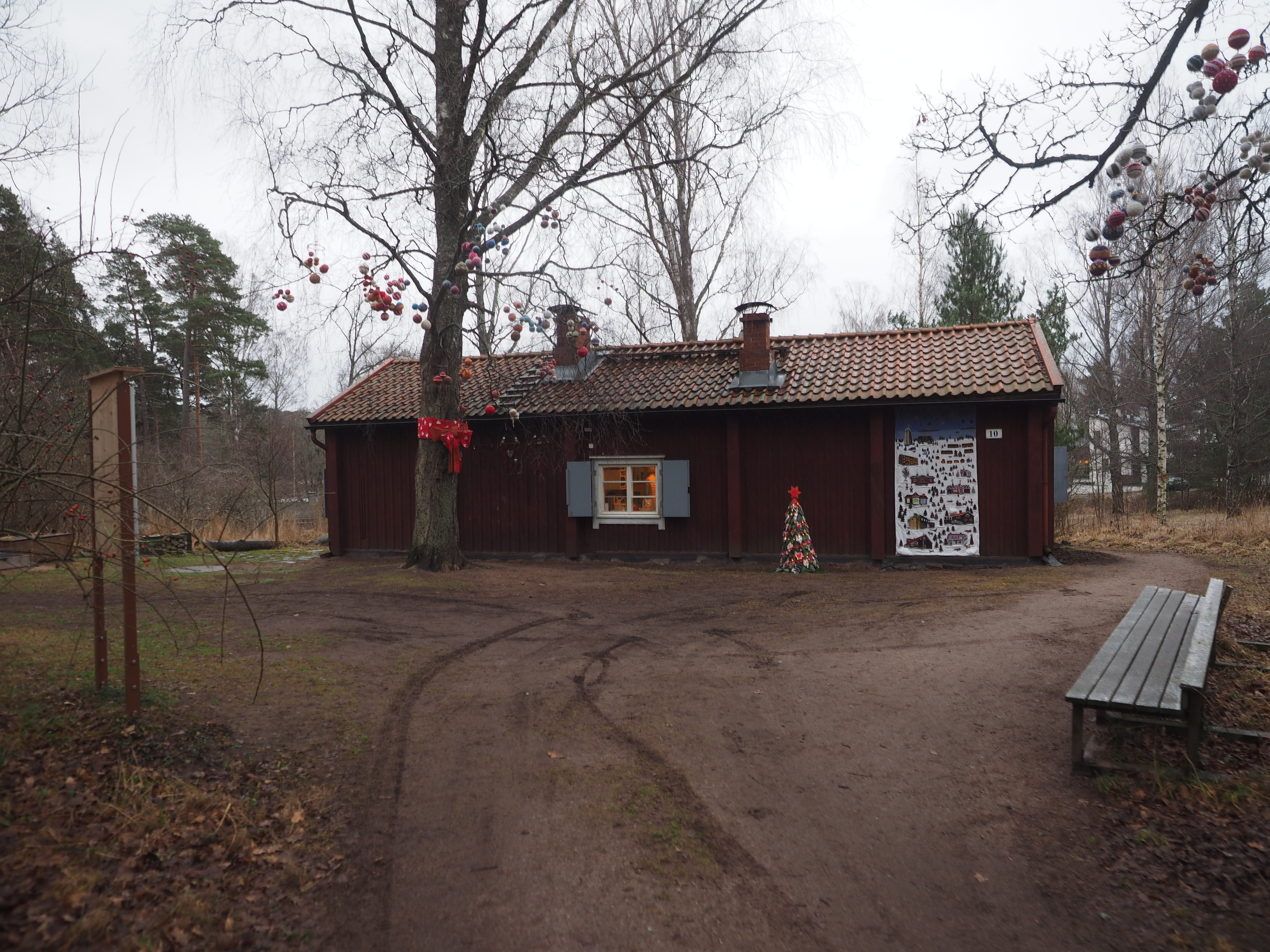
The "Sjökulla torp" in Vuosaari.

Keski-Vuosaari mainly consists of apartment buildings built in the 1960s. Its southern part has many eight-story-high apartment buildings, but otherwise the buildings have five stories at the most. The Vuosaari church designed by Pirkko and Arvi Ilonen and inaugurated in 1980 is located in Keski-Vuosaari. The current centre of Vuosaari is located on the southern edge of Keski-Vuosaari, however it was only built in the 1990s and 2000s. Nowadays it is the most important service centre in Vuosaari, hosting the Mosaiikkitori square, the Columbus shopping centre, the Vuotalo cultural centre and the Vuosaari metro station. The 26-story-high and 92 metres tall Cirrus apartment building built in 2006 is located near the shopping centre.

The area of Rastila located next to the Vuosaari bridge mostly consists of detached houses, and includes the Rastila camping ground around the main building of the Rastila manor. There are many apartment buildings near the Rastila metro station, of which some are quite high. The areas of Meri-Rastila and Kallahti to the south of the Vuotie street are tightly built apartment suburbs built in the 1990s. The buildings in these areas are muted in colour and quite low, which evokes a feeling of openness. The modern, tightly built and nature-friendly housing area of Ramsinranta is located in the southern part of Meri-Rastila. The Mustankivenpuisto park is the centre of Kallahti, and the facades of the buildings in its northern end are curved.

The apartment building areas of Kallahti and Aurinkolahti almost reach to the sea shore. A pedestrian avenue running along the coastline and several boat harbours are located in front of the areas. Aurinkolahti is a newer area, with apartment buildings built in the 2000s and a clear zoning plan. There are three small parks in the middle of the area and detached houses inside apartment building blocks. The Paulig factory used to be located in the area until it moved to the Vuosaari harbour in 2009. The old factory building was dismantled in 2012 and new apartment buildings were built in its place. There is a long sandy beach in front of Aurinkolahti. The area ends in a boat harbour, with the Uutelankanava canal with two waterfalls entering inland from its end. There is a hemispherical amphitheatre-like house at the northern end of the canal.

There are many old villas all around Vuosaari, of which many are protected. Most of the villas are located near the sea shore and in the nature-friendly areas of Uutela, Kallahdenniemi and Ramsinniemi.

== Services ==
The commercial centre of Vuosaari, located around the Vuosaari metro station and the Mosaiikkitori square, consists mainly of the Columbus shopping centre built in 1996. In the centre of Vuosaari to the north of the metro station are also located the Vuotalo cultural centre containing the Vuosaari library and the Vuosaari sports hall with a swimming pool. The Vuosaari health and welfare centre is located to the south of the metro station. There are also small shopping centres in Meri-Rastila and northern Keski-Vuosaari.

=== Education ===
There are four Finnish-speaking primary schools in Vuosaari, all of which including both the junior and the senior part: the Puistopolku school with two premises in Keski-Vuosaari and Kallahti, the Merilahti school with two premises at Meri-Rastila and Kallahti, the Vuoniitty school with three premises in northern Keski-Vuosaari and the Aurinkolahti school with three premises in Aurinkolahti. Vuosaari also has a Swedish-speaking junior primary school called Nordsjö lågstadieskola; the nearest Swedish-speaking senior primary school is Botby grundskola in Vartiokylä. The Vuosaari gymnasium is located in the centre of Vuosaari.

== Traffic ==
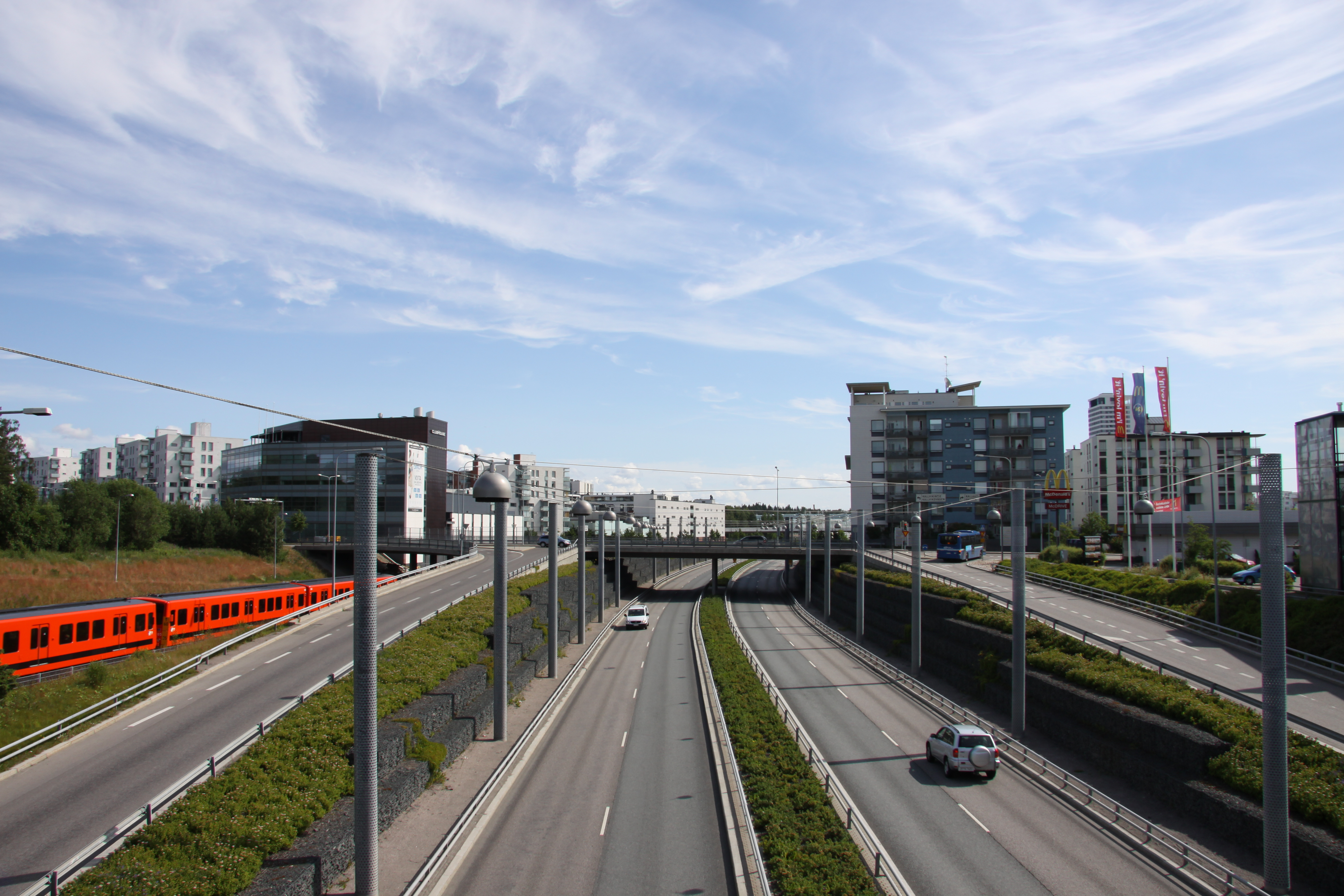
The highway-like street Vuotie runs adjacent to the Helsinki Metro line.

The street Vuotie, mostly built like a highway, is the most important car traffic connection in Vuosaari, connecting the district via the Vuosaari bridge to Ring I and Itäväylä. Other important connections are Kallahdentie leading to Itäväylä and Vuosaaren satamatie leading to Ring III.

The Helsinki Metro expanded to Vuosaari in 1998. There are two metro stations in Vuosaari. The Vuosaari metro station is located in the exact centre of Vuosaari next to the Columbus shopping centre, serving the areas of Keski-Vuosaari, Kallahti and Aurinkolahti. The Rastila metro station serves the areas of Rastila and Meri-Rastila. The trunk bus line 560 travels through Vuosaari and continues via Kontula, Malmi and Paloheinä to Myyrmäki in the neighbouring city of Vantaa.

In 2012 cruise ship traffic from Vuosaari to the city centre was started. During summer season, the cruise ship MS Okeanos travels twice per day from the pier at the end of Hiekkalaiturintie to Hakaniemi. The ship travels via Satamasaari, Iiluoto, Vartiosaari, Laajasalo and Herttoniemi to Hakaniemenranta. The ship is operated by Suomen Saaristokuljetus.

=== Vuosaari Harbour ===
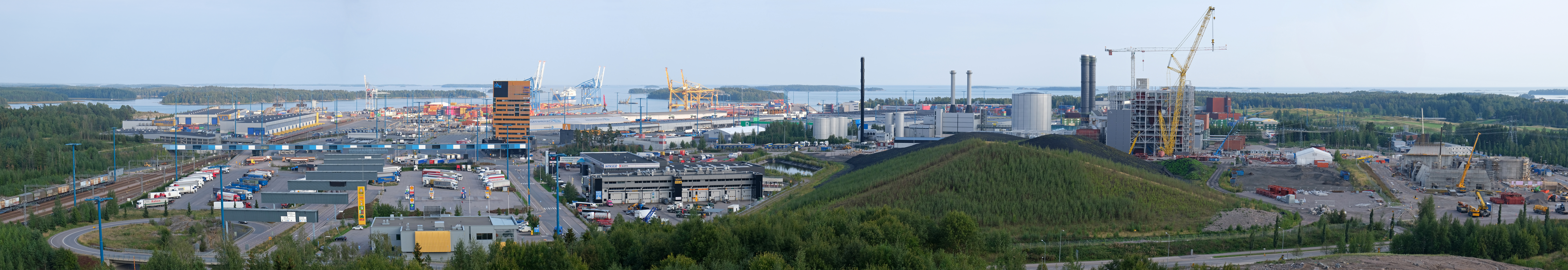
The Vuosaari Harbour seen from Vuosaarenhuippu in August 2021.

The Vuosaari Harbour is a cargo ship harbour located in the northeastern part of Vuosaari in the Niinisaari area. It was completed in late November 2008. In addition to ships only carrying cargo, it is used by passenger-cargo ships of Finnlines travelling to Travemünde and Rostock in Germany, as well as the Tallink ship MS Sea Wind and the Eckerö Line ship MS Finbo Cargo travelling to Tallinn in Estonia, also carrying passengers along with cargo. The harbour has a total area of 240 hectares and covers almost 15 percent of the total area of Vuosaari.

The Vuosaari Harbour has a connection to Ring III and to highways leading outside the capital region via the highway-level street Vuosaaren Satamatie, mostly running in a tunnel. Cargo trains can travel from the Finnish Main Line to the harbour via the 19-kilometre-long Vuosaari harbour track, of which over 13 kilometres runs in a tunnel.

== Sports ==
=== Exercise services ===
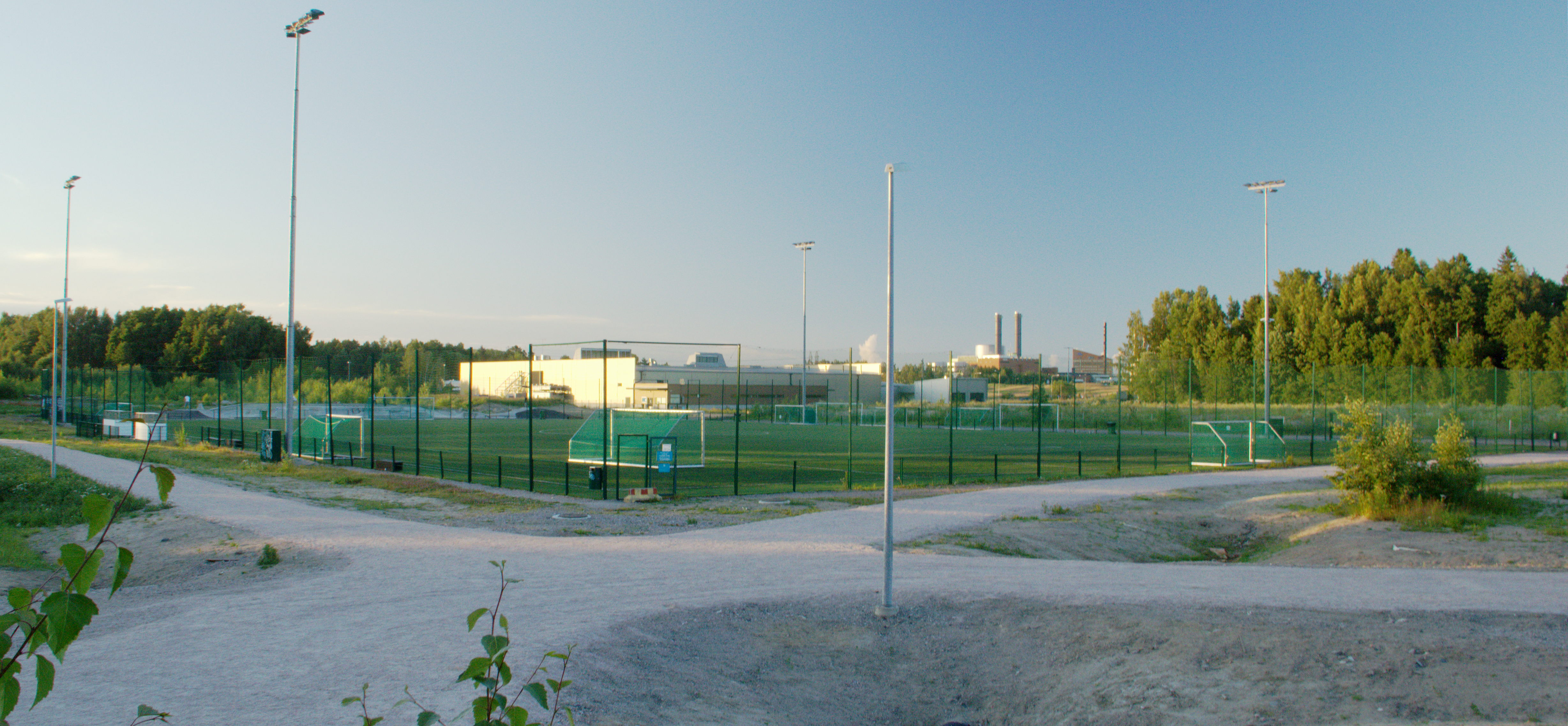
The Vuosaari exercise park.

The Vuosaari sports hall in the centre of Vuosaari is a popular place for exercise. After its renovation is complete it is estimated to reach over 750 thousand visitors per year. The Vuosaari exercise park is located to the west of the centre near Nordsjön kartano, containing a skateboarding park, three football fields and an exercise point. The Aimo Mäkinen Areena ice hockey hall is located next to the exercise park. The only paintball forest field in Helsinki, Arena Harbour, is located in the Vuosaari Harbour. One of the two full-sized 18-hole golf courses in Helsinki is located in Vuosaari.

=== Sports clubs ===
The sports life in Vuosaari is concentrated around the sports club Vuosaaren Viikingit. The football club FC Viikingit, separated from the main club, rose into the Veikkausliiga in 2007. In 2008 it fell to Ykkönen. FC Viikingit plays their home matches on the Vuosaari sports ground, which is colloquially known as "Hettari" or "Monttu" ("the pit") because of its location at the end of Heteniityntie and its shape. FC Viikingit also has an active junior sports club with about 750 players in 40 different teams. The other popular sport in Vuosaari is floorball with the primary team being SSV Helsinki (although it plays its home matches in Pasila).
