= Rastila =

Coordinates: 60°12′N 25°07′E

Rastila Rastböle
- Helsinki Subdivision
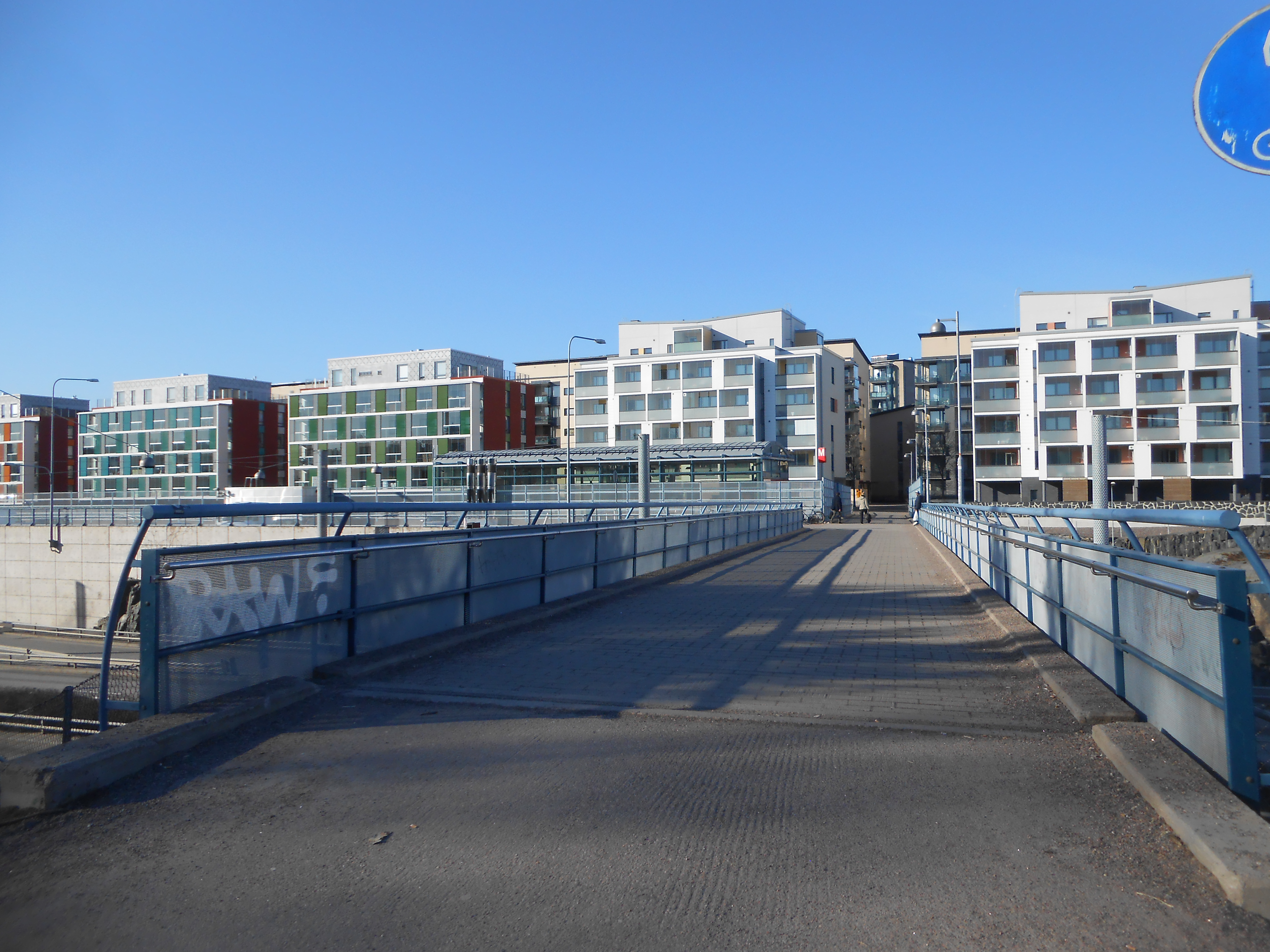
- Rastila

- Position of Rastila within Helsinki
- Country: Finland
- Region: Uusimaa
- Sub-region: Greater Helsinki
- Municipality: Helsinki
- District: Eastern
- Subdivision regions: none
- Area: 1.09 km^{2} (0.42 sq mi)
- Population (2005): 4,212
  - Density: 3,938/km^{2} (10,200/sq mi)
- Postal codes: 00980
- Subdivision number: 547
- Neighbouring subdivisions: Keski-Vuosaari, Kallahti, Meri-Rastila, Puotila, Vartioharju

Rastila (Swedish: Rastböle) is an eastern suburb in the Vuosaari district of Helsinki, Finland. Rastila lies to the north of the arterial road Vuotie (Sw. Norvägen); to the south lies Meri-Rastila (Sw. Havs-Rastböle), which is often understood as part of Rastila. Rastila metro station opened in 1998. Rastila is mostly populated by families in detached houses, but around the station there are new blocks of flats for 2000 inhabitants.

Rastila is home to Helsinki's only campsite, Rastila Camping, which connects with the popular swimming beach at Vartiokylänlahti (Sw. Botbyviken).

== Demography ==
The area is home to 4,212 inhabitants (as of 31.12.2012), it provides jobs for 368 (as of 31.12.2010), and its land area is 1.11 km^{2}.

== History ==
Around 6000–7000 years ago, Rastila was on the shore of the Littorina Sea. About 25 metres above sea level, there is still a rocky beach remaining from this phase on the cliffs a little way to the north of the campsite. In the area of Vanttikallio there are still Bronze Age barrows.

Rastila is first recorded in documents from the Middle Ages, when the area was located in the estate of Rassbölen. The name subsequently changed to Rastböle. From the 17th century the territory of served as a taxation area and around the 18th century mid-Rastila Manor. The present manor house was built in the early 19th century. It is located at the campsite and now serves as a restaurant. In the early 20th century the manor house still served as a lively and large country estate. Rastila gained a brick factory when the building of Suomenlinna began.

== Images ==
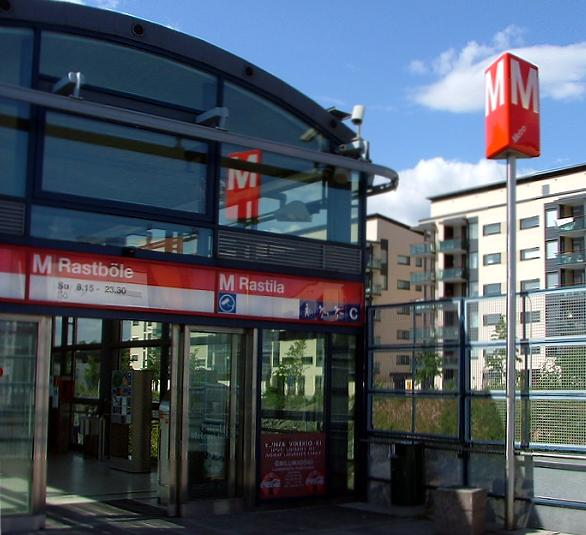
Rastila metro station

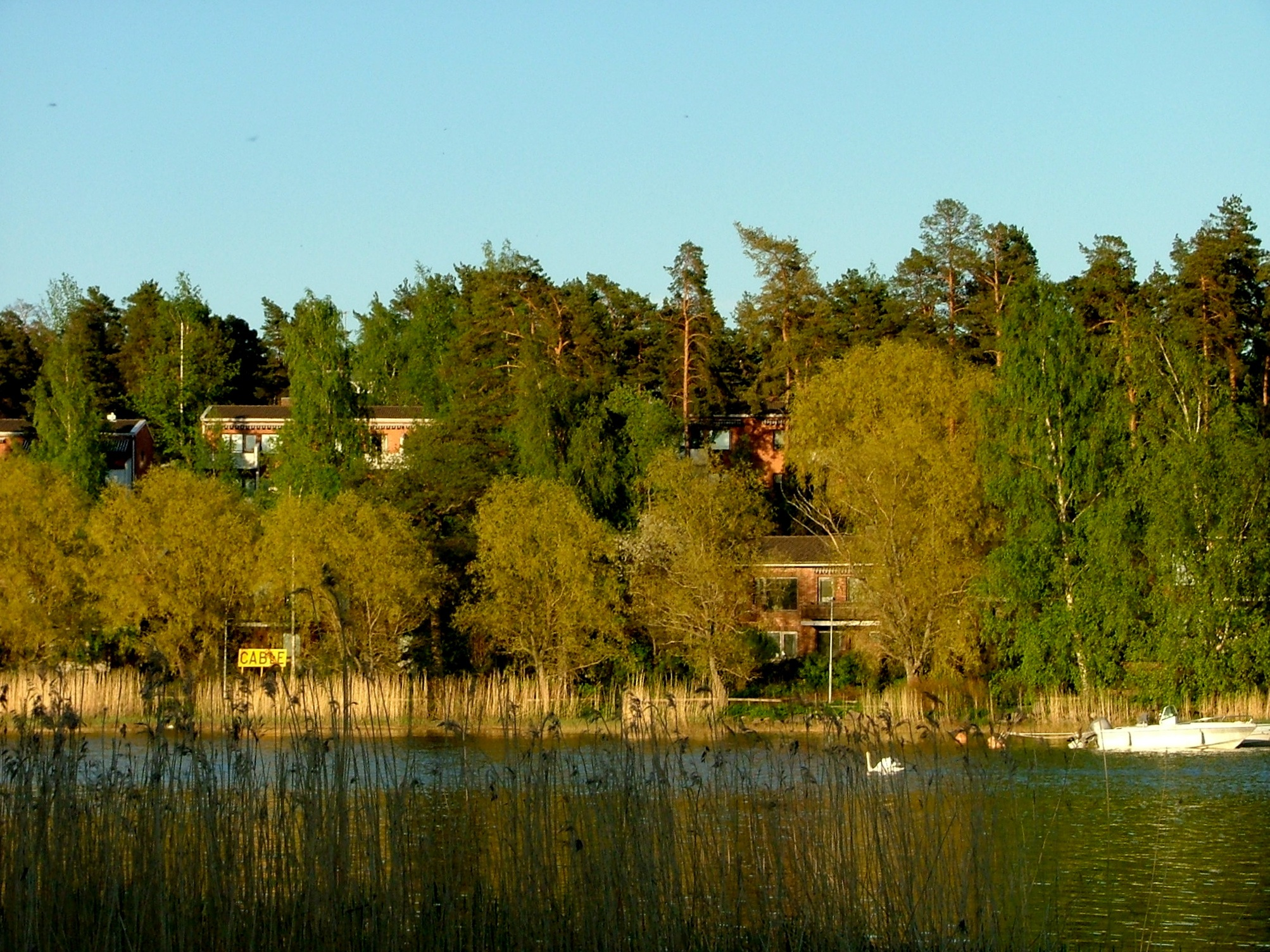
Houses by Vartiokylänlahti/Botbyviken in Rastila

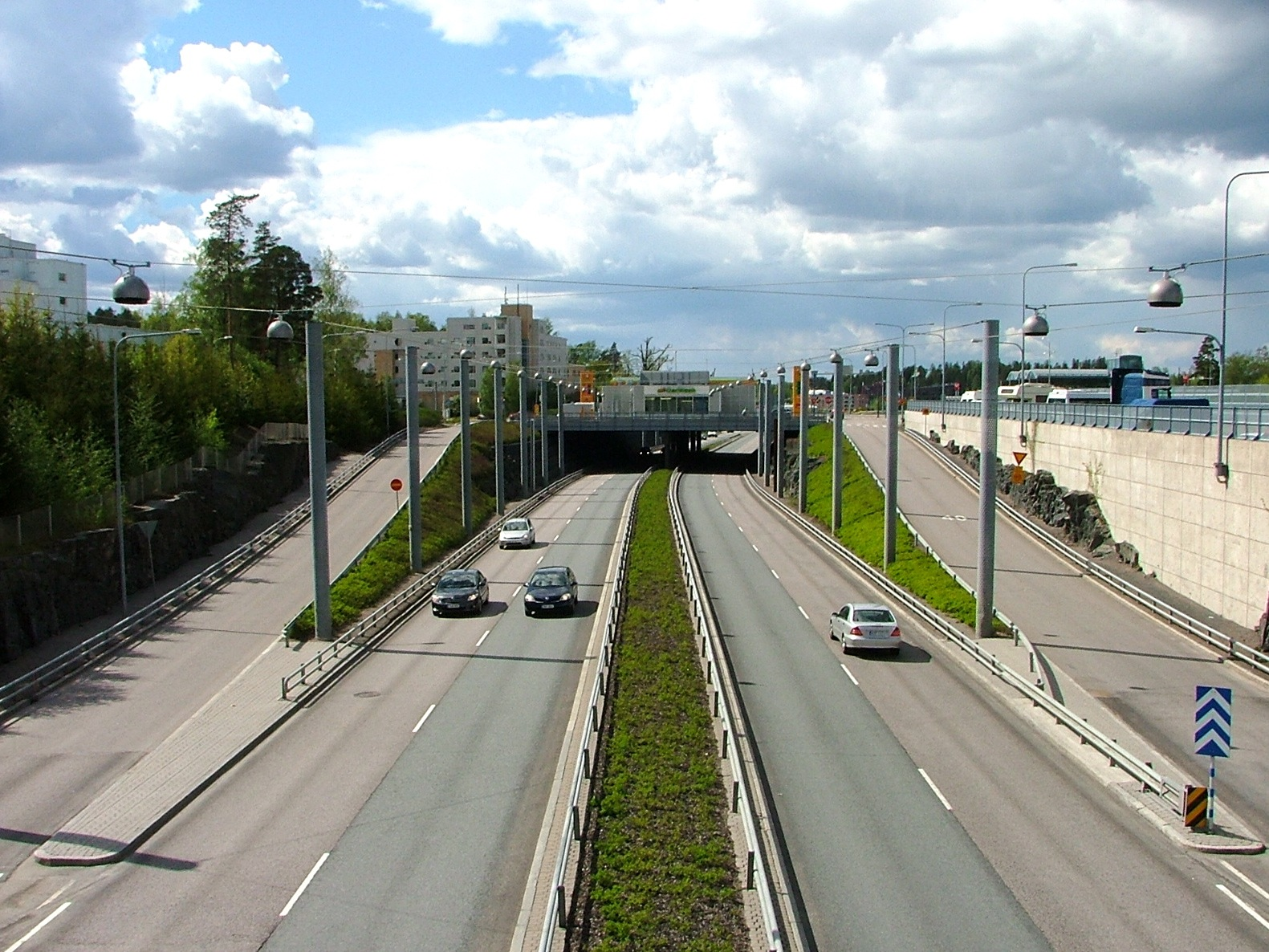
Vuotie/Norvägen, which divides Rastila on the north side from Meri-Rastila/Havs-Rastböle on the south

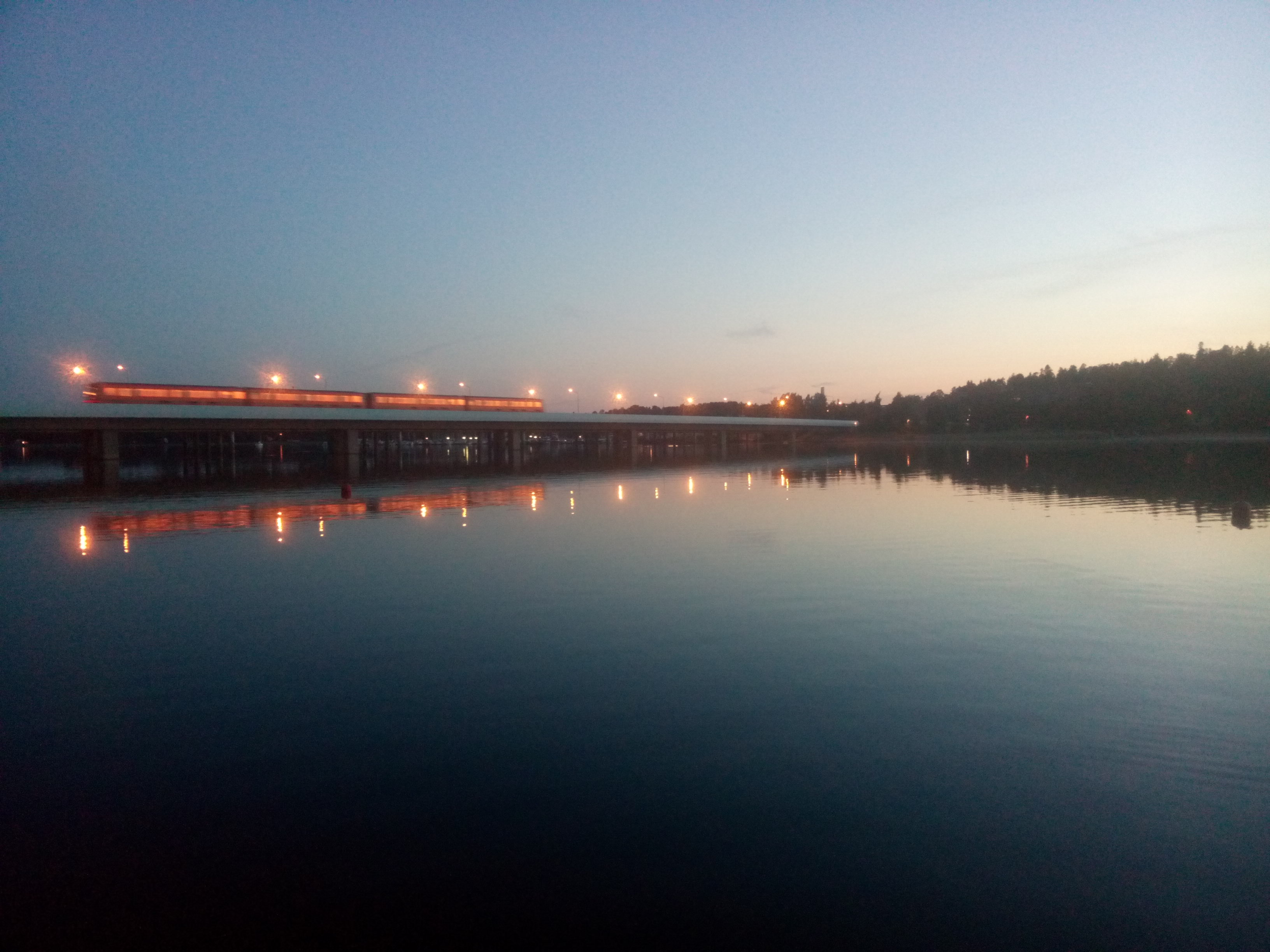
Metro train crosses Vuosaaren Silta

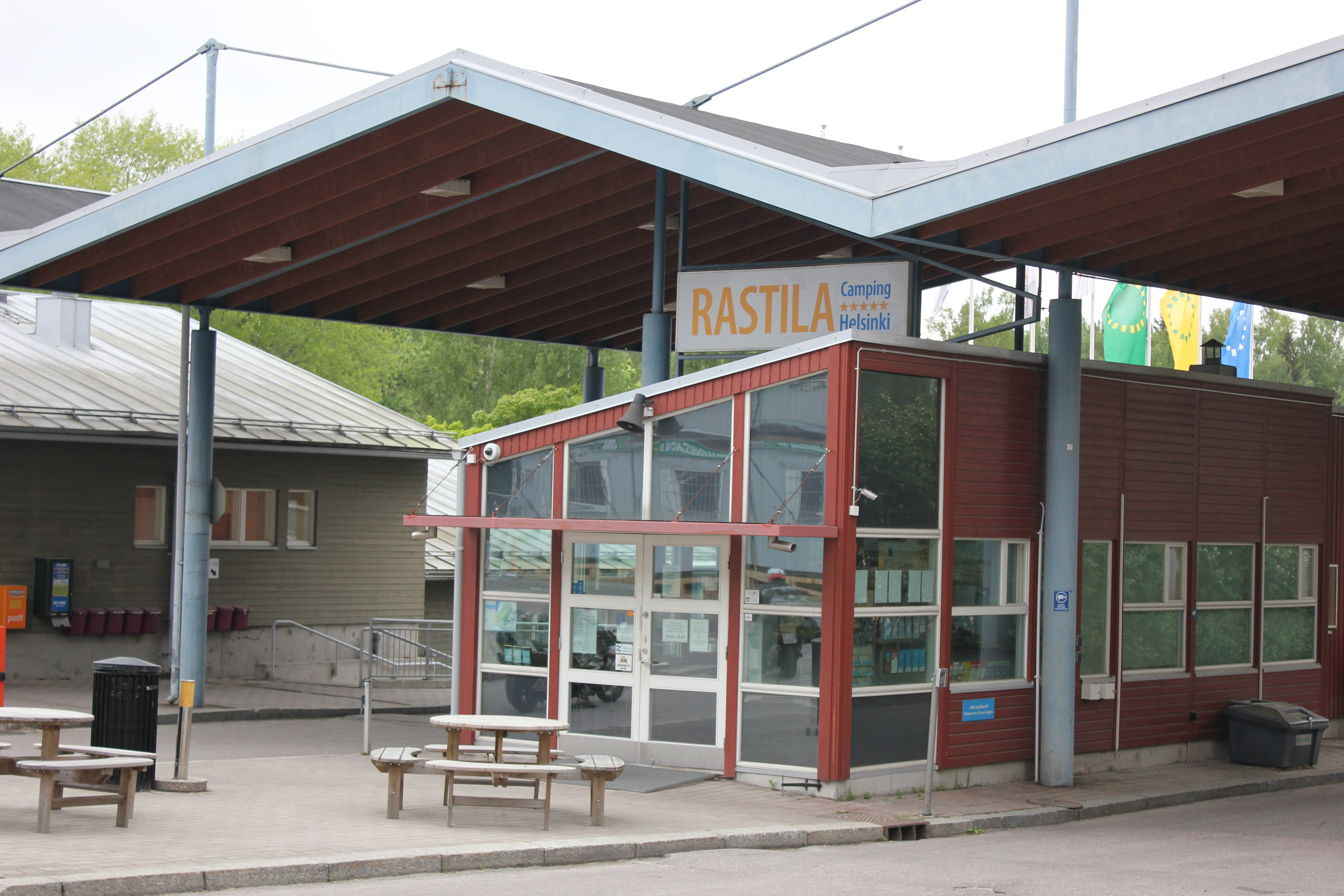
Rastila Camping
