= Mellunmäki =

Coordinates: 60°14′N 25°08′E

Mellunmäki Mellungsbacka
- Helsinki Subdivision
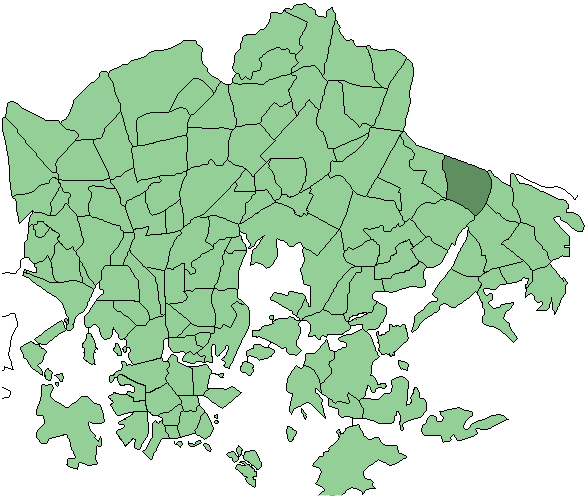
- Position of Mellunmäki within Helsinki
- Country: Finland
- Region: Uusimaa
- Sub-region: Greater Helsinki
- Municipality: Helsinki
- District: Eastern
- Subdivision regions: none
- Area: 2.23 km^{2} (0.86 sq mi)
- Population (2013): 8,500
  - Density: 3,582/km^{2} (9,280/sq mi)
- Postal codes: 00970
- Subdivision number: 473
- Neighbouring subdivisions: Mustavuori, Keski-Vuosaari, Vartioharju, Vesala

Mellunmäki (Swedish: Mellungsbacka) (Slang: Meltsi) has been a quarter of eastern Helsinki, Finland since 1946.

Serious construction of Mellunmäki began in 1950 and the area was originally designed for 7,000 residents. Today in 2023 there are almost 9,000 people living in the area.

Mellunmäki provides several essential services such as four grocery stores, three kiosks, four hairdressers, two physiotherapists, three restaurants, a 24/7 gym, and two nursing homes. More services can be found one metro station away in Kontula Kontula or in Itäkeskus (Itis) shopping mall three metro stations away.

The metro station of Mellunmäki, the last stop on the line, is the world's northernmost metro station. Many new homes are being built in the area, so the population is expected to increase significantly.

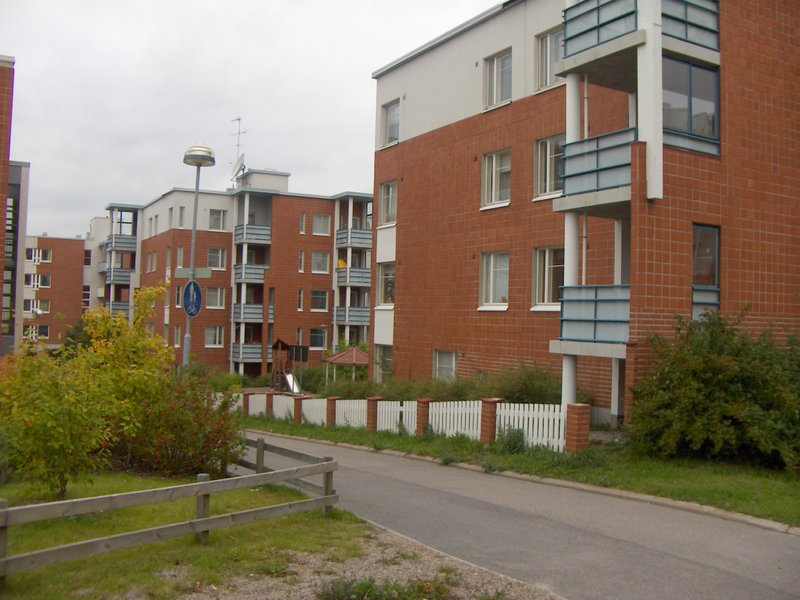
Houses in the Mellunmäki residential area

Several bus connections and subway access exist in the area. The closest notable neighbours are Kontula, Vesala, Länsimäki (a district of Vantaa), Vuosaari, and Vartioharju.

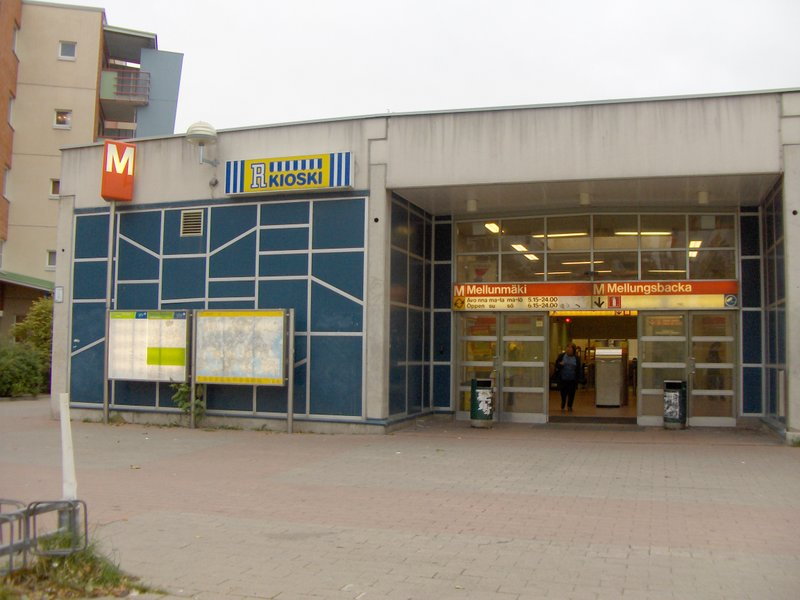
Entrance to the Mellunmäki metro station
