= Kallahti =

Kallahti Kallvik
- Helsinki Subdivision
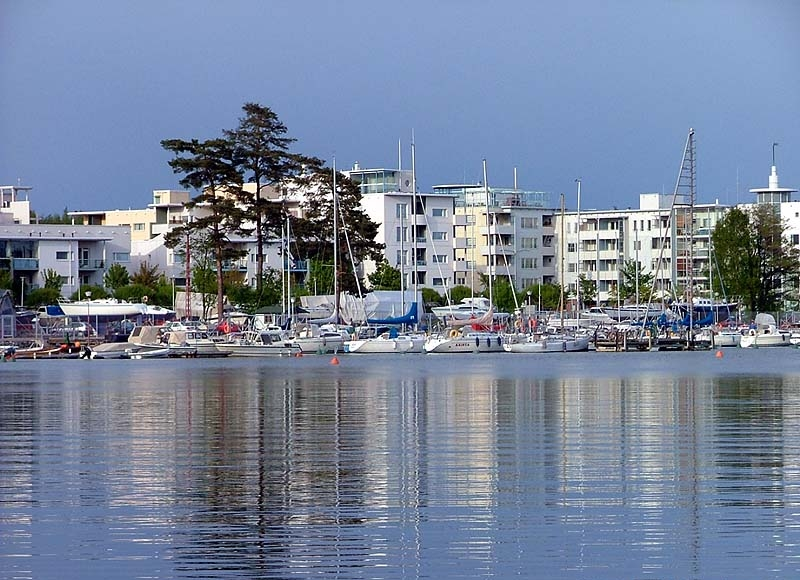

- Position of Kallahti within Helsinki
- Country: Finland
- Region: Uusimaa
- Sub-region: Greater Helsinki
- Municipality: Helsinki
- District: Eastern
- Subdivision regions: none
- Area: 1.93 km^{2} (0.75 sq mi)
- Population (2005): 7,175
  - Density: 3,717/km^{2} (9,630/sq mi)
- Postal codes: 00980
- Subdivision number: 545
- Neighbouring subdivisions: Meri-Rastila, Rastila, Keski-Vuosaari, Aurinkolahti

Kallahti (Finnish: [ˈkɑlːɑhti]; Swedish: Kallvik) is a neighborhood in the Vuosaari district of Helsinki, Finland. The area consists mainly of apartment buildings built between 1991 and 1999. There are 6,854 inhabitants in Kallahti (1 January 2017).

== Demographics ==
There are a total of 2,642 immigrants in Kallahti, making up nearly 40% of the population. 1,121 come from Europe (16.4%), 798 come from Asia (11.7%), 669 come from Africa (9.8%) and 54 come from elsewhere (0.8%). The share of people with a foreign background in Kallahti is the largest of all areas of Helsinki.

== Politics ==
Results of the 2011 Finnish parliamentary election in Kallahti:

- True Finns 22.5%
- Social Democratic Party 21.7%
- National Coalition Party 18.9%
- Green League 12.7%
- Left Alliance 11.5%
- Centre Party 4.1%
- Swedish People's Party 2.9%
- Christian Democrats 2.9%
