= Vuosaari sports ground =

Sports venue in Helsinki, Finland

- Heteniitty, Monttu
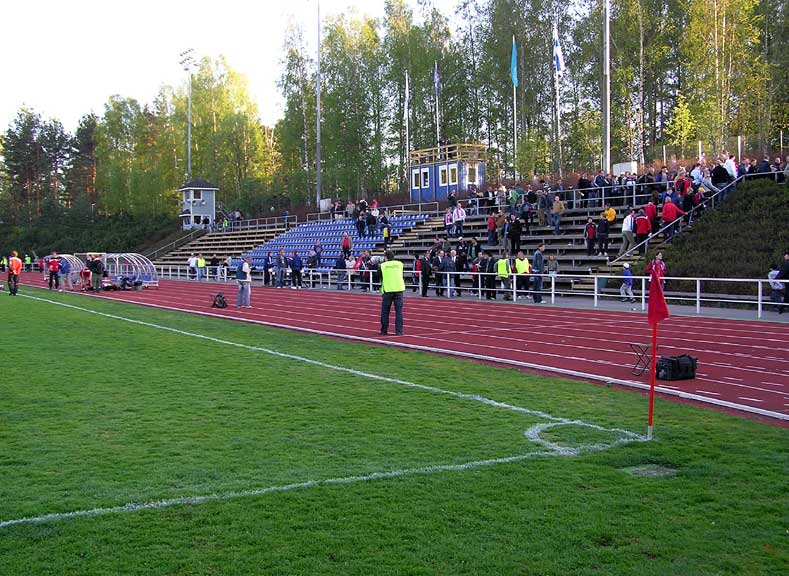
- Interactive map of Vuosaari sports ground
- Full name: Vuosaaren urheilukenttä
- Location: Vuosaari, Helsinki, Finland
- Coordinates: 60°13′00″N 25°08′19″E
- Owner: City of Helsinki
- Capacity: 1,500; 3,500 (2007)
- Surface: Grass
- Scoreboard: Yes

Construction
- Built: 1966
- Renovated: 1996, 2007

Tenant
- FC Viikingit (1966–present)

Vuosaari sports ground (Finnish: Vuosaaren urheilukenttä, also known as Heteniitty) is a football and athletics ground in Vuosaari, Helsinki. It is the home ground of the East Helsinki football club FC Viikingit, who play in the Finnish first division (Ykkönen). In addition, the athletics field is used by Viipurin Urheilijat. The ground currently has a capacity of approximately 1,500 spectators, but it was expanded to 3,500 seats in the 2007 season, when Viikingit played in the Finnish premier division.

The ground is also called Heteniitty due to its location along Heteniityntie. Nicknames include Hettari and Monttu ('the Pit'), the latter derived from the shape of the ground and the fact that it was built in the location of a former borrow pit.

== History ==
The ground was constructed in 1966 in the place of a former borrow pit, owing to a proposal made by the Vuosaari Foundation (Vuosaari-säätiö). Several national records in athletics were broken in Vuosaari in the 1970s. The ground was renovated in 1996. The renovation included, among other things, improvements to lighting, the running track and the stands.

Major changes were again made in 2007, as FC Viikingit were promoted to the Veikkausliiga. The main stand was expanded to seat 1,000 spectators, and temporary stands were built opposite the main stand and in the curves. These changes brought the total number of seats to 3,500. The attendance record of 4,255 was created during the 2007 season in the local derby between FC Viikingit and HJK Helsinki. After Viikingit were relegated back to the first division, most of the new stands were torn down. The attendance record for first division matches was made on 21 July 2011, as 1,670 spectators turned out to see the Reds' match against local rivals HIFK.

== Transport connections ==
The ground is located in Central Vuosaari in the address Heteniityntie 2. It lies approximately one kilometre north of Vuosaari metro station, and can be reached on foot or with the buses 78 and 90. The ground has a small car park, and on match days the adjacent gravel field is converted into a temporary car park.
