= Nordsjön kartano =

Nordsjön kartano Nordsjö gård
- Helsinki Subdivision
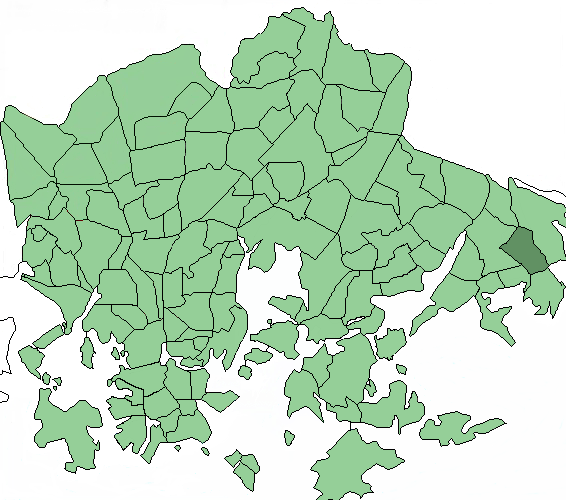
- Position of Nordsjön kartano within Helsinki
- Country: Finland
- Region: Uusimaa
- Sub-region: Greater Helsinki
- Municipality: Helsinki
- District: Eastern
- Subdivision regions: none
- Area: 1.28 km^{2} (0.49 sq mi)
- Population (2005): 22
  - Density: 17/km^{2} (44/sq mi)
- Postal codes: 00980, 00981, 00990 (?)
- Subdivision number: 542
- Neighbouring subdivisions: Uutela, Aurinkolahti, Keski-Vuosaari, Mustavuori, Niinisaari

Nordsjön kartano (Finnish), Nordsjö gård (Swedish) is an eastern neighborhood of Helsinki, Finland.
