= Uutela =

Coordinates: 60.19948°N 25.17174°E

Uutela Nybondas
- Helsinki Subdivision
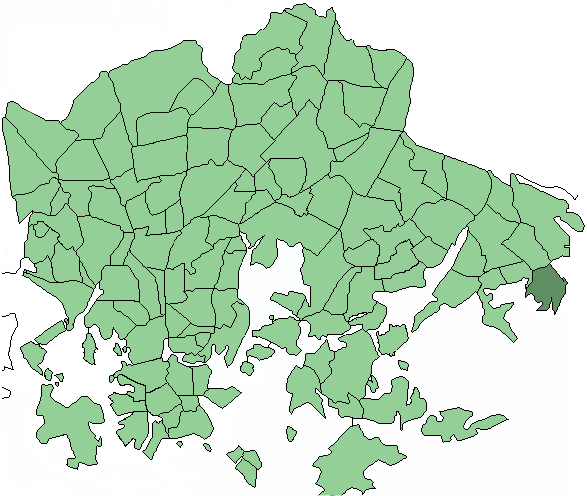
- Position of Uutela within Helsinki
- Country: Finland
- Region: Uusimaa
- Sub-region: Greater Helsinki
- Municipality: Helsinki
- District: Eastern
- Subdivision regions: none
- Area: 1.35 km^{2} (0.52 sq mi)
- Population (2005): 15
  - Density: 111/km^{2} (290/sq mi)
- Postal codes: 00980, 00981, 00990
- Subdivision number: 54
- Neighbouring subdivisions: Aurinkolahti, Nordsjön kartano, Niinisaari

Uutela (Swedish: Nybondas) is a nature park in Vuosaari, Helsinki, Finland. It is surrounded by the sea on three sides, and as one of Helsinki's best-preserved nature parks, Uutela attracts visitors from all over the Helsinki capital area. Uutela has a small idyllic marina where people keep their boats, right next to which is cafe Kampela which offers traditional pancakes and salmon soup. This area is known for hikers and outdoor people because of its landscape and vegetation.

Uutela is large enough to contain Skatta farm - one of several farms within the boundaries of Helsinki. The farm is known for having previously been inhabited by the artist Miina Äkkijyrkkä, but it is now rented to Suomen Setlementtisäätiö.

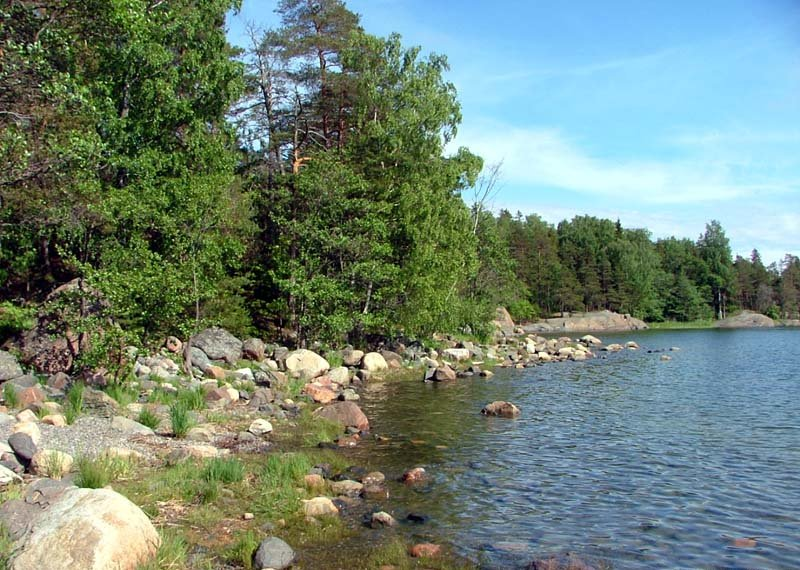
Uutela
