= Marjaniemi =

Coordinates: 60°12′15″N 025°05′15″E

Marjaniemi Marudd
- Helsinki Subdivision
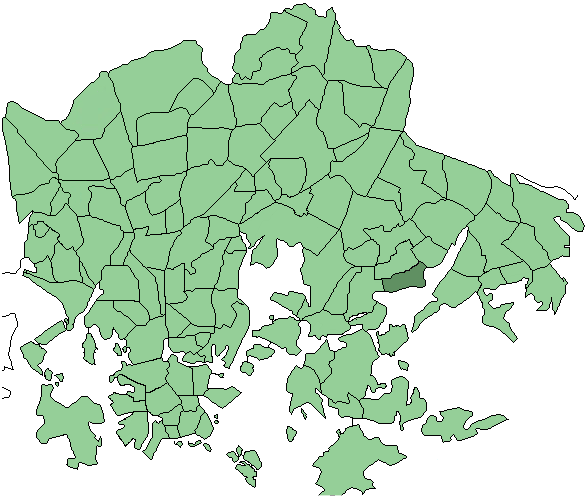
- Position of Marjaniemi within Helsinki
- Country: Finland
- Region: Uusimaa
- Sub-region: Greater Helsinki
- Municipality: Helsinki
- District: Eastern
- Subdivision regions: none
- Area: 1.02 km^{2} (0.39 sq mi)
- Population (2005): 1,964
  - Density: 1,925/km^{2} (4,990/sq mi)
- Postal codes: 00930, 00931
- Subdivision number: 455
- Neighbouring subdivisions: Roihuvuori, Itäkeskus, Puotila, Meri-Rastila

Marjaniemi (Swedish: Marudd) is a seaside residential area in eastern Helsinki, Finland, with a population of approximately 2,000. Administratively, it forms a quarter in the neighbourhood of Vartiokylä.

Marjaniemi is a sought-after neighborhood, and the real estate prices rank among the highest in the city.

== Politics ==
Results of the 2011 Finnish parliamentary election in Marjaniemi:

- National Coalition Party 41.7%
- Social Democratic Party 18.0%
- True Finns 12.2%
- Green League 9.5%
- Left Alliance 6.6%
- Swedish People's Party 4.6%
- Centre Party 3.7%
- Christian Democrats 1.9%
