= Niinisaari =

Coordinates: 60.218°N 25.184°E

Niinisaari Bastö
- Helsinki Subdivision
- Interactive map of Niinisaari
- Country: Finland
- Region: Uusimaa
- Sub-region: Greater Helsinki
- Municipality: Helsinki
- District: Eastern
- Subdivision regions: none
- Area: 3.19 km^{2} (1.23 sq mi)
- Population (2005): 0
  - Density: 0/km^{2} (0/sq mi)
- Subdivision number: 548
- Neighbouring subdivisions: Uutela, Aurinkolahti, Keski-Vuosaari, Mustavuori, Vantaa, Sipoo

Niinisaari (Finnish), Bastö (Swedish) is an eastern neighborhood of Helsinki, Finland.
