= Meri-Rastila =

Coordinates: 60°12′10″N 25°7′10″E

Meri-Rastila Havsrastböle
- Helsinki Subdivision
- Position of Meri-Rastila within Helsinki
- Country: Finland
- Region: Uusimaa
- Sub-region: Greater Helsinki
- Municipality: Helsinki
- District: Eastern
- Subdivision regions: none
- Area: 1.90 km^{2} (0.73 sq mi)
- Population (2005): 5,049
  - Density: 2,657/km^{2} (6,880/sq mi)
- Postal codes: 00980
- Subdivision number: 544
- Neighbouring subdivisions: Kallahti, Rastila, Vartiosaari, Marjaniemi, Puotila

Meri-Rastila (Finnish), Havsrastböle (Swedish) is an eastern neighborhood of Helsinki, Finland.

== Politics ==
Results of the 2011 Finnish parliamentary election in Meri-Rastila:

- Social Democratic Party 22.1%
- True Finns 21.4%
- National Coalition Party 15.2%
- Green League 14.2%
- Left Alliance 12.4%
- Centre Party 4.1%
- Swedish People's Party 4.0%
- Christian Democrats 3.7%
