= Paulig =

Finnish food and drink company

Paulig Ltd
- Founded: 1876; 150 years ago in Helsinki, Finland
- Founder: Gustav Paulig
- Headquarters: Helsinki, Finland
- Brands: Santa Maria; Paulig; Conimex; Poco Loco; Zanuy
- Website: https://www.pauliggroup.com

Paulig is a Finnish family-owned food and drink company, founded in 1876 in Helsinki, Finland. Paulig offers a wide variety of Tex-Mex products and concepts, snacks, coffees, World Foods and spices. Among the company's brands are Santa Maria, Paulig, Conimex, Poco Loco and Zanuy. Paulig also manufactures products for industry and private label customers. The company has 2800 employees across 13 countries.

== History ==
=== Foundation and early years (1871–1907) ===
Paulig was founded in 1876 by Gustav Wilhelm Paulig, a merchant from Lübeck, Germany (then German Empire), who had trained with the trading house Piehl & Fehling, a supplier of colonial goods to Finland. After moving to Finland in 1871 to work for Nokia Ltd, he established his own trading and agency business in Helsinki, dealing in coffee, spices, sugar, oils, rice, and dried fruit. Within its first year, the firm imported over 300,000 kilograms of green coffee—around seven per cent of Finland's total coffee imports.

By the 1880s, Gustav Paulig had begun roasting coffee himself in small rotating drums, leading to the creation of Finland's first commercial coffee-roasting operation in 1904. He designed the company's “P” trademark, officially registered in 1905. Paulig's strict commitment to quality and business ethics defined his approach, captured in his maxim: “Never compromise on quality.” Following his death in 1907, the business passed to his wife Bertha Paulig, who became one of Finland's first female corporate leaders.

=== Expansion under Bertha and Eduard Paulig (1907–1939) ===
Bertha Paulig oversaw major expansion, including the construction of a seven-storey headquarters and roasting house in Helsinki's Katajanokka district in 1911. Its tall chimney, nicknamed “the mayor’s pipe”, became a local landmark. She also purchased a chain of cafés previously owned by Julius Nissen and added tea to the company's range.

In 1919 the firm became a limited company, A.B. Gustav Paulig O.Y., with Bertha's son Eduard Paulig appointed managing director. Eduard strengthened Paulig's position by forging direct relationships with coffee producers in South and Central America and modernising production.

The company introduced Finland's first pre-packed coffee for consumers in 1924, followed by ready-ground and date-stamped coffee in 1931—both pioneering innovations in Europe. Paulig's Juhla Mokka and Presidentti blends, launched in 1929, became enduring staples of Finnish coffee culture. By the 1930s, Paulig's products had earned multiple gold medals at Finnish industrial fairs for their quality and consistency.

=== Wartime and post-war recovery (1939–1959) ===
During the Winter War and Continuation War, coffee imports to Finland ceased, and Paulig produced substitutes made from acorns, rye, and barley. Despite wartime shortages, the company maintained wages for employees serving at the front and sent regular care parcels.

In 1942, Paulig established the Nordic region's first frozen-food plant in Helsinki's Herttoniemi district to supply the armed forces. After the war, this innovation introduced frozen foods to Finnish consumers.

Coffee returned to Finland in 1946 with the arrival of the ship Herakles from Brazil. Rationing ended in 1954, and Paulig resumed full coffee production. The company's Paula Girl advertising icon, first introduced in the 1920s, was brought to life by a real spokesperson in 1950, becoming one of Finland's most recognisable marketing symbols.

During the 1950s, Paulig expanded its product lines, introduced modern packaging, and popularised filter coffee in Finland through collaboration with the German brand Melitta. Its Café Parisien blend, launched in 1958, reflected growing interest in European coffee culture.

=== Modernisation and diversification (1960–1980) ===
In 1968, Paulig opened a new coffee roastery in Vuosaari, inaugurated by President Urho Kekkonen. The new facility, then the largest in the Nordic countries, used automated systems and introduced the “golden cup” emblem symbolising Paulig's commitment to quality.

The 1970s marked a period of diversification and strategic change. Paulig phased out wholesale operations to focus on manufacturing and consumer products, expanding into shipping and frozen foods. It also established the Paula Consumer Service in 1971 to engage directly with consumers through recipes and product information.

Paulig celebrated its centenary in 1976 under the leadership of Henrik Paulig, who emphasised innovation, quality, and efficiency. The company's frozen food and mustard products became household staples, while its coffee brands continued to dominate the Finnish market.

=== Globalisation and the spice era (1981–2000) ===
During the 1980s, Bertel Paulig, representing the fourth generation of the founding family, became chief executive. The company introduced the gentle P-roast hot-air roasting process and founded the Paulig Coffee Institute in 1980 to promote coffee education and quality standards in Finland's hospitality industry.

Paulig expanded internationally by acquiring the British coffee company Appleton, Machin & Smiles Ltd (later Paulig UK) in 1986, and by forming the Nordic Spice Alliance in 1991 with Swedish and Danish partners, uniting their seasoning brands under Santa Maria.

In 1993, Paulig re-established operations in Estonia with a roastery and spice plant in Saue, reopening business ties lost during the Second World War. The company also acquired the British coffee brand Lyons in the 1990s and took a share in the German Fuchs Group in 2000.

Throughout the decade, Paulig focused on sustainability, introducing lighter packaging, reducing waste, and developing environmentally responsible production. By the turn of the millennium, it had evolved from a Finnish coffee roaster into an international food company recognised for its emphasis on quality, innovation, and ethical business practices.

=== Innovation and sustainable growth 2001–present ===
In the 2000s, Paulig continued international expansion and modernised production with a new roastery in Vuosaari. The company placed growing emphasis on sustainable growth and innovation.

During the 2010s, Paulig diversified beyond coffee and spices by acquiring the Swedish brand Risenta and expanding its Santa Maria and Poco Loco brands across Europe. They also obtained majority shares in Gold & Green foods, entering the pulled oats market. Sustainability became an even stronger strategic priority: the company launched its 2030 Sustainability Approach, set science-based climate targets approved by the Science Based Targets initiative, introduced a dedicated Climate Fund, and committed to traceable and certified sourcing of green coffee.

In 2018 Paulig established PINC, its corporate venture capital arm, to invest in early-stage start-ups focused on sustainable food systems, novel ingredients, and circular economy solutions.

In 2022, Paulig acquired the Spanish snacks manufacturer Liven, a producer of plant-based snacks and tortillas made from pulses and grains, strengthening its Tex Mex and snacking business. That same year, the company sold its stake in Gold & Green to Valio, including the brand, research, and patents. Paulig also sold its Russian operations following the invasion of Ukraine.

On 31 March 2023, Paulig sold its Frezza brand, launched in 2003, to Juustoportti.

In 2024, Paulig announced a €42 million investment in a new savoury-snacks production facility in Spain, supporting European growth and sustainable sourcing goals. Later that year, it acquired the British sauces and condiments maker Panesar Foods Ltd to expand in the World Foods category.

In 2025, Paulig acquired the Dutch brand Conimex and expanded its presence in the Asian category.

Today, Paulig remains a family-owned business operating in more than a dozen countries, with sales to over 70 markets around the world.
