= Vuotalo =

Culture centre in Helsinki, Finland

Coordinates: 60°12′30″N 25°08′37″E

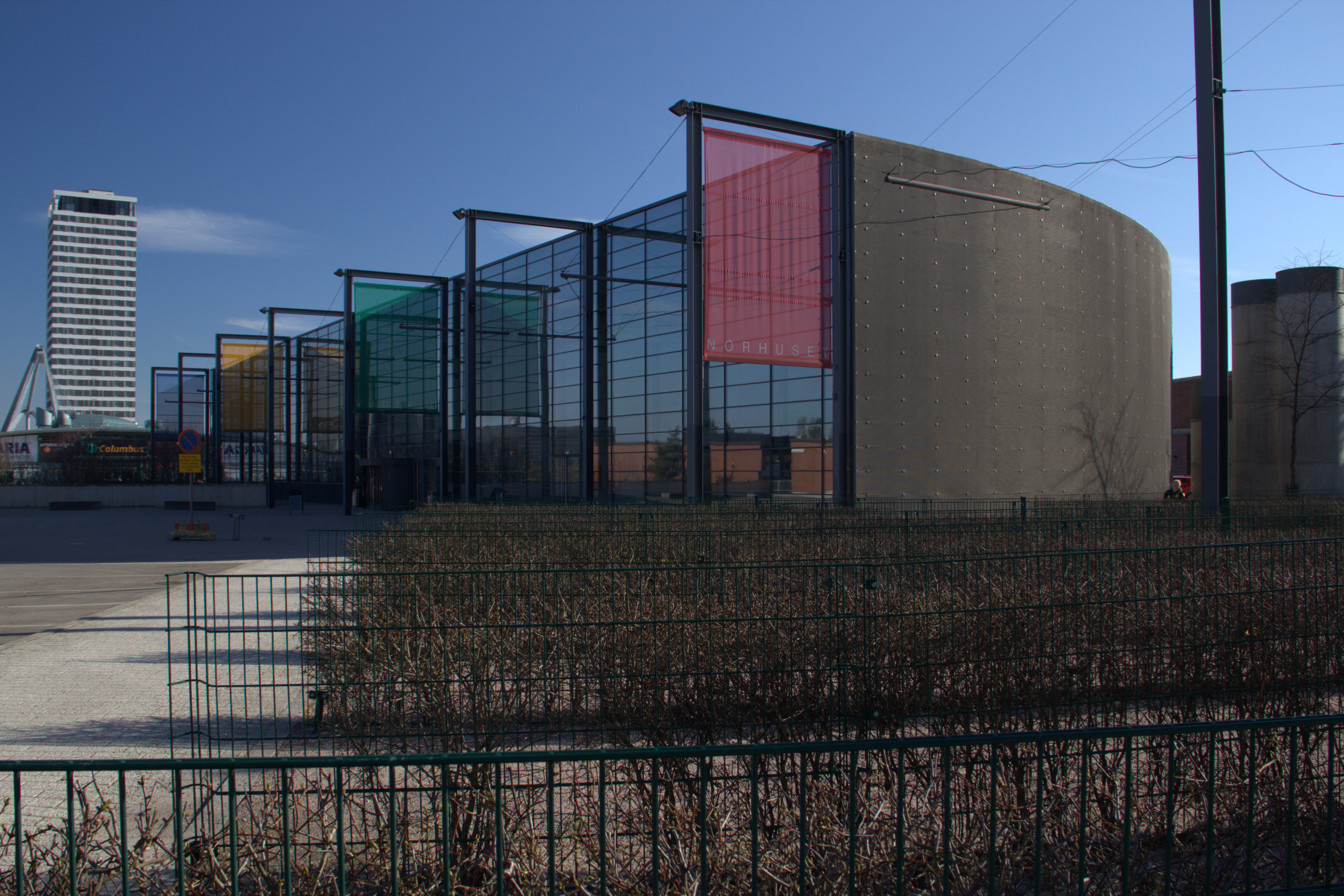
The front facade of Vuotalo is made of glass wall.

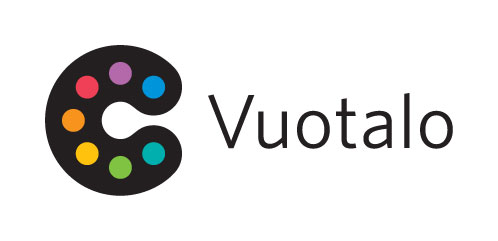
The Vuotalo logo.

Vuotalo (Swedish: Nordhuset) is a cultural centre located in Vuosaari, Helsinki, Finland north of the Mosaiikkitori square, near the Columbus shopping centre, the Vuosaari metro station, the Vuosaari sports hall and the Vuosaari high school. The building was designed by Mikko Heikkinen and Markku Komonen and it was completed in 2001.

== General ==
Vuotalo houses a branch of the city library of Helsinki, a workers' institute, hobby spaces for music and arts, and a hall for theatre and dance performances. The Helsinki cultural centre holds cultural events in Vuotalo. The program includes concerts, films, children's events, theatre and senior events. The gallery hosts varying exhibitions throughout the year. The first floor of Vuotalo hosts the Vuosaari library, café Pokkari and a branch of the Lippupiste tickets office. The bright gallery and the Vuosali hall with 320 spaces are located at the first floor. The office of the Helsinki cultural centre and the eastern branch of the Helsinki workers' institute are located at the second floor. The workers' institute also has premises at the corridor between VUotalo and the Vuosaari high school.

== History ==
An architecture competition about Vuotalo was held in 1996. The preconditions for the building site were numerous. There should be a connection to the north to the Vuosaari shopping centre. A connecting corridor perpendicular to the footpath should be built to the adjacent school and sports hall. The construction project of the area also included expansion of the schools and reorganisation of the yards and construction of 420 parking places connected to the Vuosaari metro station. The architectural contest was won by Heikkinen-Komonen Oy's proposal "a la kyltyyri". The building was completed in 2001 and its construction costs amounted to 9.92 million euro.

== Structure ==
The building is semi-circular in shape and its basic structure resembles a hinge, where multifaceted functional and transport connections attach into each other. As the building has light roofs, a sector-shaped auditorium with a long tensor, glass facades and steel barriers around the pedestrian paths, the overground support structures are built in steel. The building also has supplementary building parts, such as equipment and maintenance bridges in the auditorium equipped with trembling dampeners and stairs made from steel. The support pillars of the building are in the centre in a 6-by-6-metre (20 ft × 20 ft) square. In parts of the structure, the pillars are round. The bulkheads in the levels are joined and the panels are hollow.

Horizontal tension of the structure has been partly done with concrete intermediary walls and partly with fire-protected steel lattices. The underground floor of the building and the parking garage partly located underneath the building, as well as the school expansion and the tunnel leading to the Vuosaari sports hall are made of steel-reinforced concrete. The fire resistance class of the supporting structure is R60. The steel structures of the light roofs and the upper floor of the auditorium have been constructed based on a pyrotechnic calculation without fire protection.

=== Facade ===
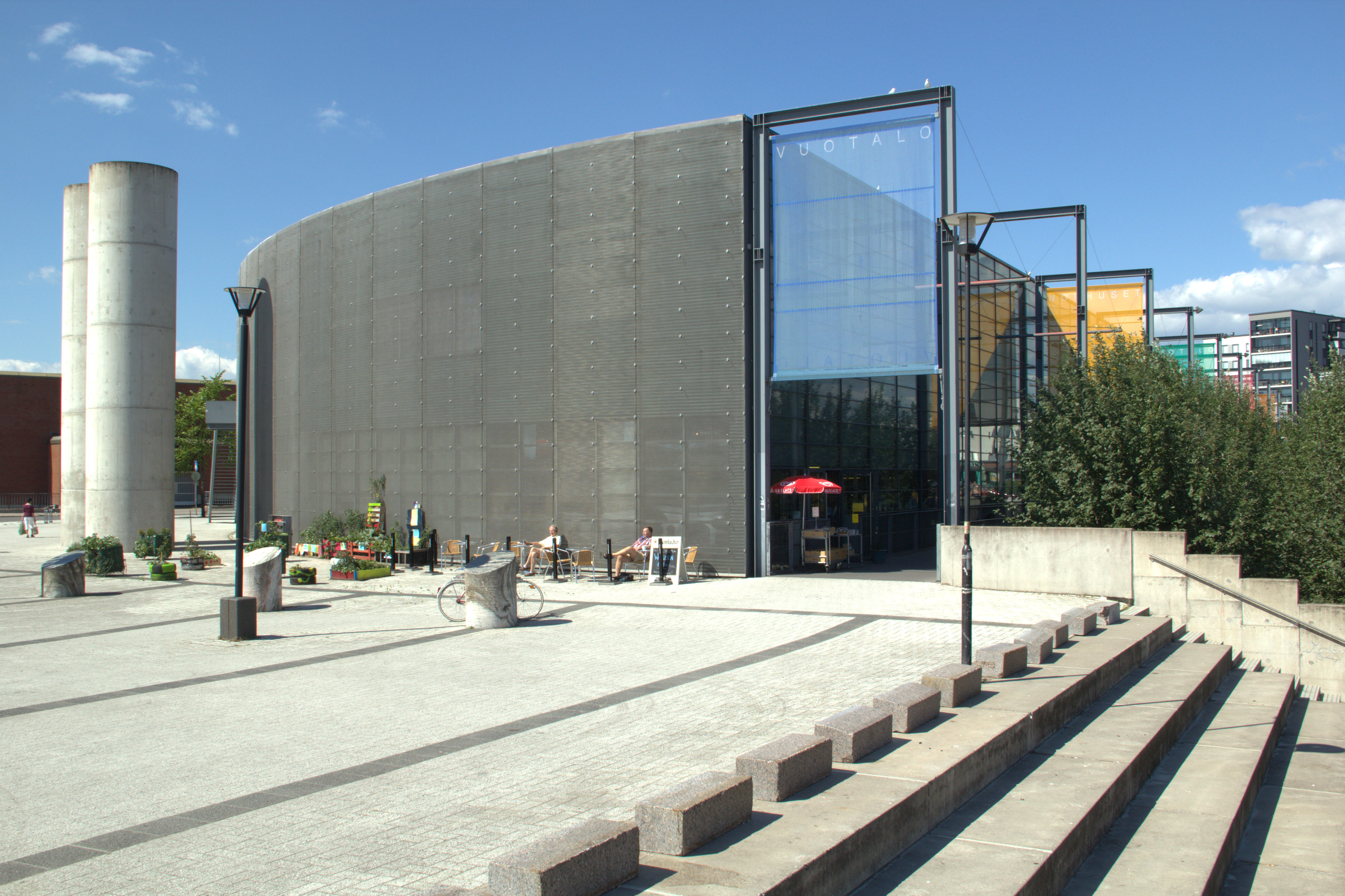
The front facade of Vuotalo consists of a glass wall and the back facade of a steel lattice.

The front facade of the building consists of a glass wall two floors in height. The back facade of the building uses a stainless steel lattice. The curved interior shell of the lattice is made of concrete cast in place. The wide place-cast wall of the auditorium is tensed with steel pillars partly reaching outside the wall, which also support the steel structures of the roof.

== Interior ==
In contrast to the metal superstructure the interior of Vuotalo uses plenty of wood. The floor is made of thermoprocessed birch and the interior walls are made of pine lattices. The walls feature artworks by Jaakko Tornberg and Pekka Syrjälä.
