= Aurinkolahti =

Coordinates: 60°12′08″N 025°09′13″E

Aurinkolahti Solvik
- Helsinki Subdivision
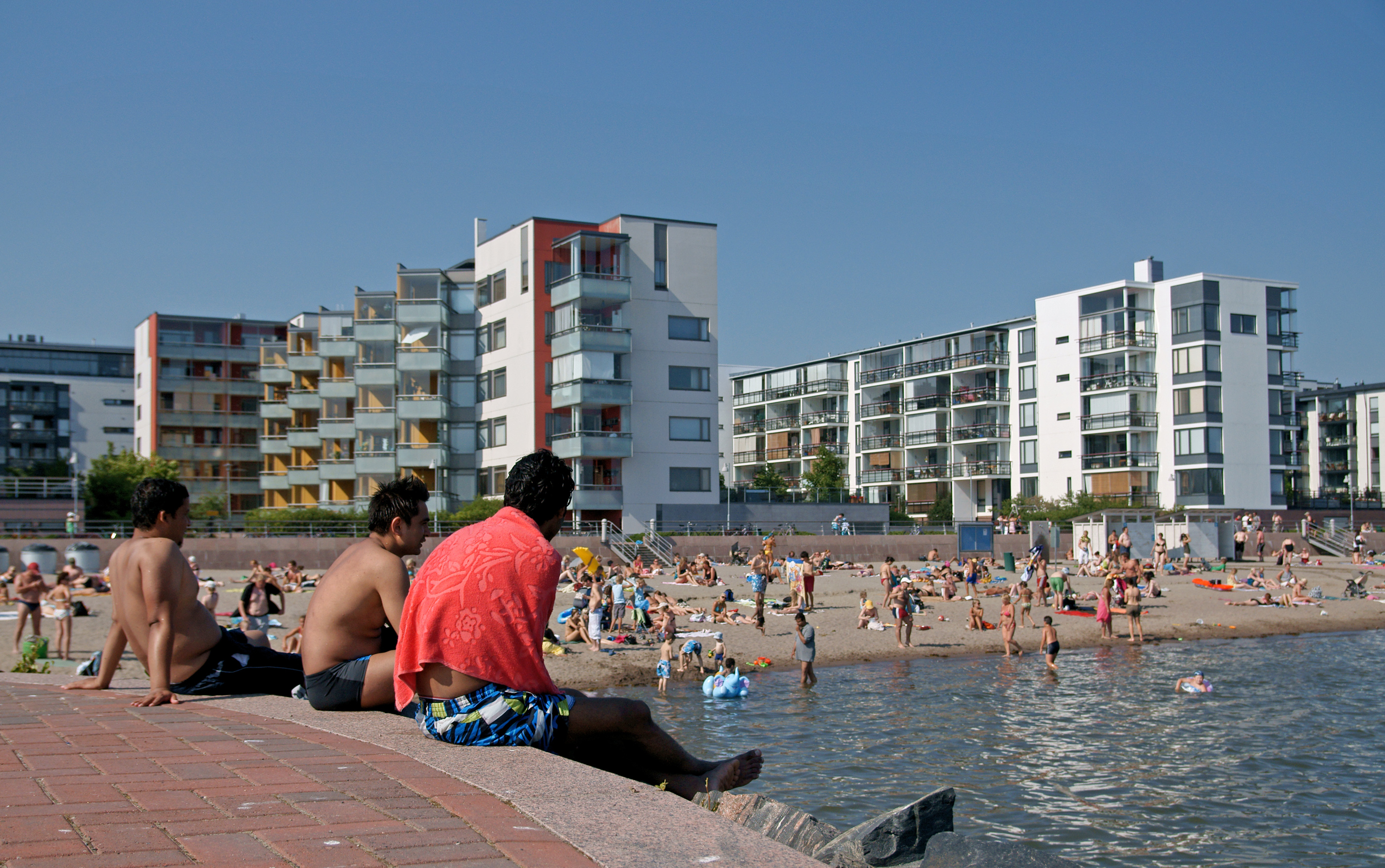
- Aurinkolahti beach
- Interactive map of Aurinkolahti
- Country: Finland
- Region: Uusimaa
- Sub-region: Greater Helsinki
- Municipality: Helsinki
- District: Eastern
- Subdivision regions: none
- Area: 1.05 km^{2} (0.41 sq mi)
- Population (2005): 3,491
  - Density: 3,324/km^{2} (8,610/sq mi)
- Postal codes: 00990
- Subdivision number: 546
- Neighbouring subdivisions: Kallahti, Keski-Vuosaari, Nordsjön kartano, Uutela

Aurinkolahti (meaning "Sunny Bay"; Swedish: Solvik) is a young and fast-growing sub-neighbourhood of the East Helsinki neighbourhood of Vuosaari, in Helsinki, Finland. Aurinkolahti's original name was Mustalahti ("Black Bay"), but for marketing reasons the decision was made to update it.

== History ==
Construction of residential buildings in Aurinkolahti began in 2000 and is still continuing. The completed neighbourhood will have about 7,000 residents.

The neighbourhood was planned by the city of Helsinki as a residential area for high-income people, in order to balance the low-income housing in much of East Helsinki and boost the image of Vuosaari. Much of the housing which has been built there to date is upscale condominiums; the housing development includes a regional fiber-optic network, 700m of swimming beach and a 200-place small-craft harbour, among other amenities.

== Transit connections ==
Aurinkolahti is easily accessible by public transport. The transit time between Vuosaari's metro station and downtown Helsinki is about 20 minutes. Located approximately 1 km from the Vuosaari metro station, Aurinkolahti can be reached on foot, by bicycle or bus, as well as by car. By car the area is served by the Ring III motorway.

Aurinkolahti is also located just south of the Columbus shopping centre, and six minutes by metro from Itis, the Nordic countries' largest shopping centre.

== See also ==
- Hietaniemi Beach
