= Porvarinlahti =

Bay in Helsinki, Finland

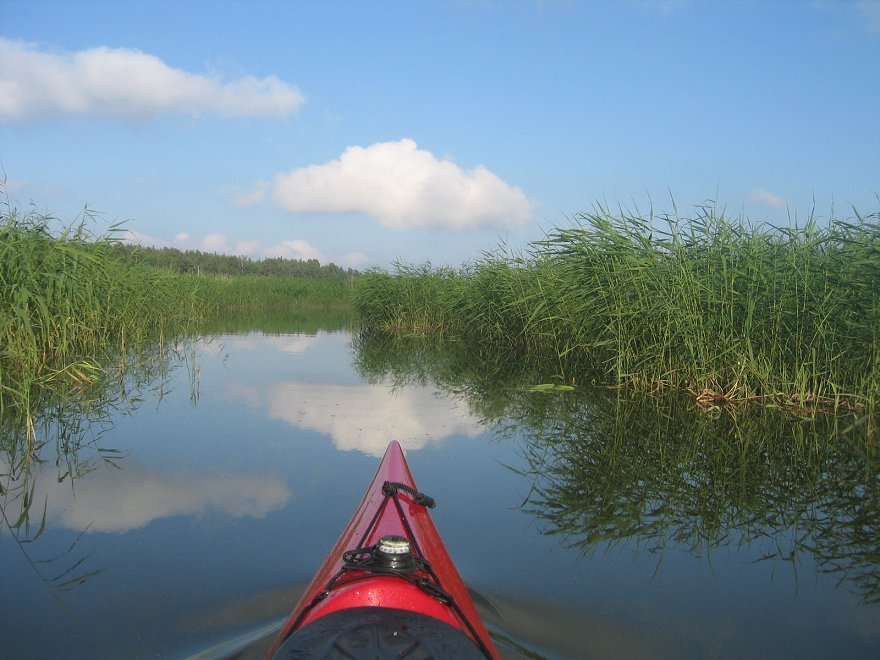
A boat in Porvarinlathi Bay

Porvarinlahti (Swedish Borgarstrandsviken) is a bay in Helsinki (before 1 January 2009 in Vantaa), Finland, near the borders of Vantaa and Sipoo.

Porvarinlahti used to be the only place where Vantaa directly bordered the Baltic Sea. The bay is approximately 2 km long and 50 m wide. Immediately to the south of the bay lies Helsinki and immediately to the north lies Sipoo. Near the bay's mouth, at approximately 60°13′N 25°11′E, was a three-municipality border point between Vantaa, Helsinki and Sipoo, with Vantaa forming a sort of wedge shape between Helsinki and Sipoo. On January 1, 2009, Vantaa ceded the Porvarinlahti area to Helsinki as Helsinki annexes part of Sipoo. Helsinki thus gained a third neighbour municipality and Vantaa lost its only connection to the sea.
