= Keski-Vuosaari =

Keski-Vuosaari Mellersta Nordsjö
- Helsinki Subdivision
- Location within Helsinki Location within Helsinki (mainland) Location within Finland
- Country: Finland
- Region: Uusimaa
- Sub-region: Greater Helsinki
- Municipality: Helsinki
- District: Eastern
- Subdivision regions: none
- Area: 2.59 km^{2} (1.00 sq mi)
- Population (2005): 12,568
  - Density: 4,852/km^{2} (12,570/sq mi)
- Postal codes: 00960, 00980
- Subdivision number: 541
- Neighbouring subdivisions: Kallahti, Rastila, Vartioharju, Mellunmäki, Mustavuori, Nordsjön kartano, Aurinkolahti

Keski-Vuosaari (Finnish), Mellersta Nordsjö (Swedish) is an eastern neighborhood of Helsinki, Finland.
