= Rastila metro station =

Helsinki Metro station

Rastila Rastböle
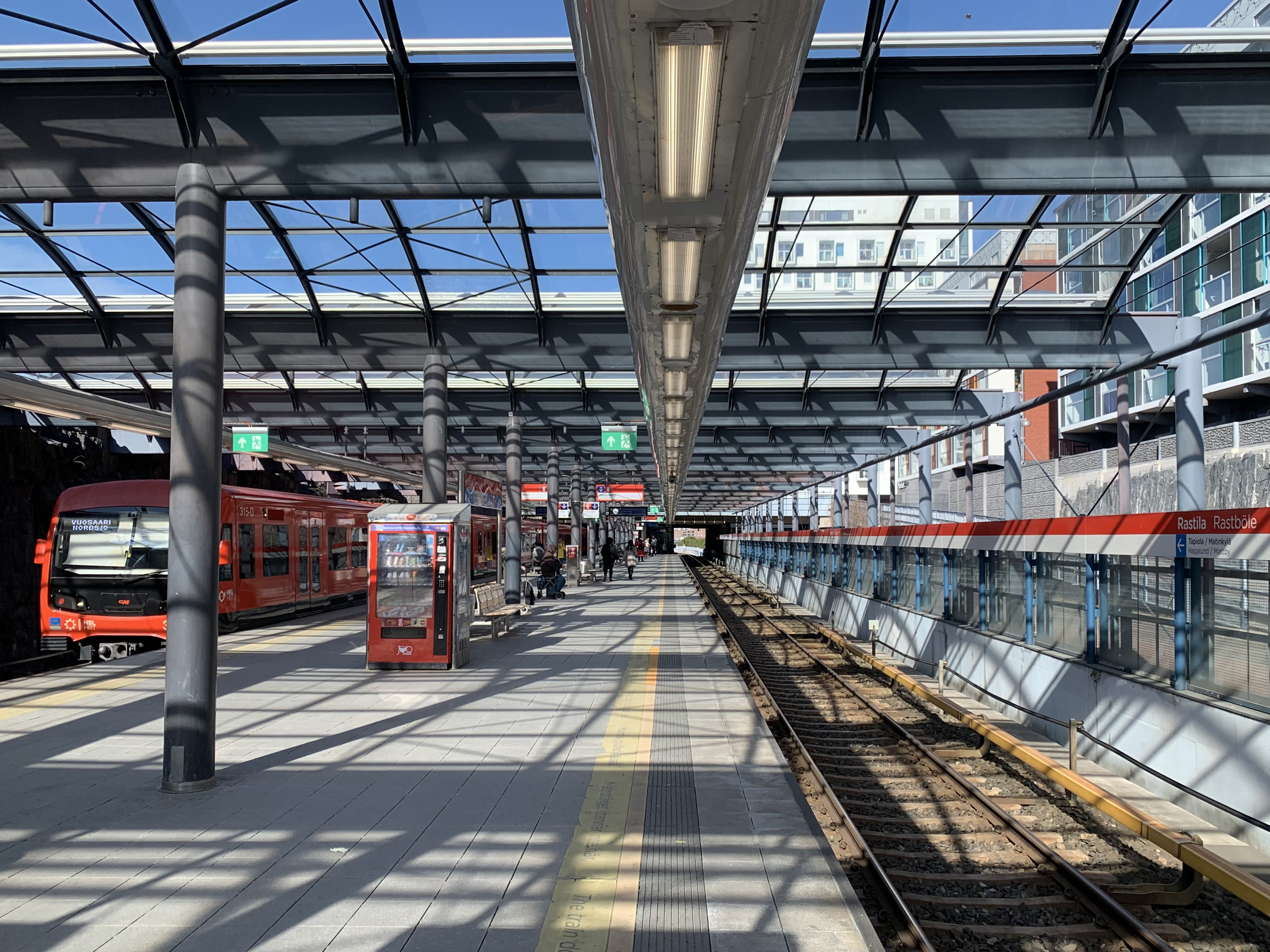

General information
- Location: Karavaanisilta 3, Helsinki
- Coordinates: 60°12′19″N 25°7′17″E
- System: Helsinki Metro station
- Owner: HKL
- Platforms: 1
- Tracks: 2
- Connections: bus lines: 90A 90N 96N 98 560

Construction
- Structure type: At grade
- Parking: 43 spaces
- Cycle facilities: 134 spaces
- Accessible: Yes

Other information
- Fare zone: B

History
- Opened: 31 August 1998

Passengers
- 10,100 daily

Services
Preceding station	Helsinki Metro	Following station
Puotila towards Kivenlahti	M1	Vuosaari Terminus
Location

Rastila metro station (Finnish: Rastilan metroasema, Swedish: Rastböles metrostation) is a ground-level station on the M1 line of the Helsinki Metro. There are 134 bicycle and 34 car parking spaces at Rastila. It serves the residential areas of Meri-Rastila and Rastila in the district of Vuosaari, in East Helsinki.

The station was opened on 31 August 1998. It was designed by Irmeli Grundström and Juhani Vainio. The station is located 2.0 kilometers from the Puotila metro station, and 1.2 kilometers from the Vuosaari metro station.

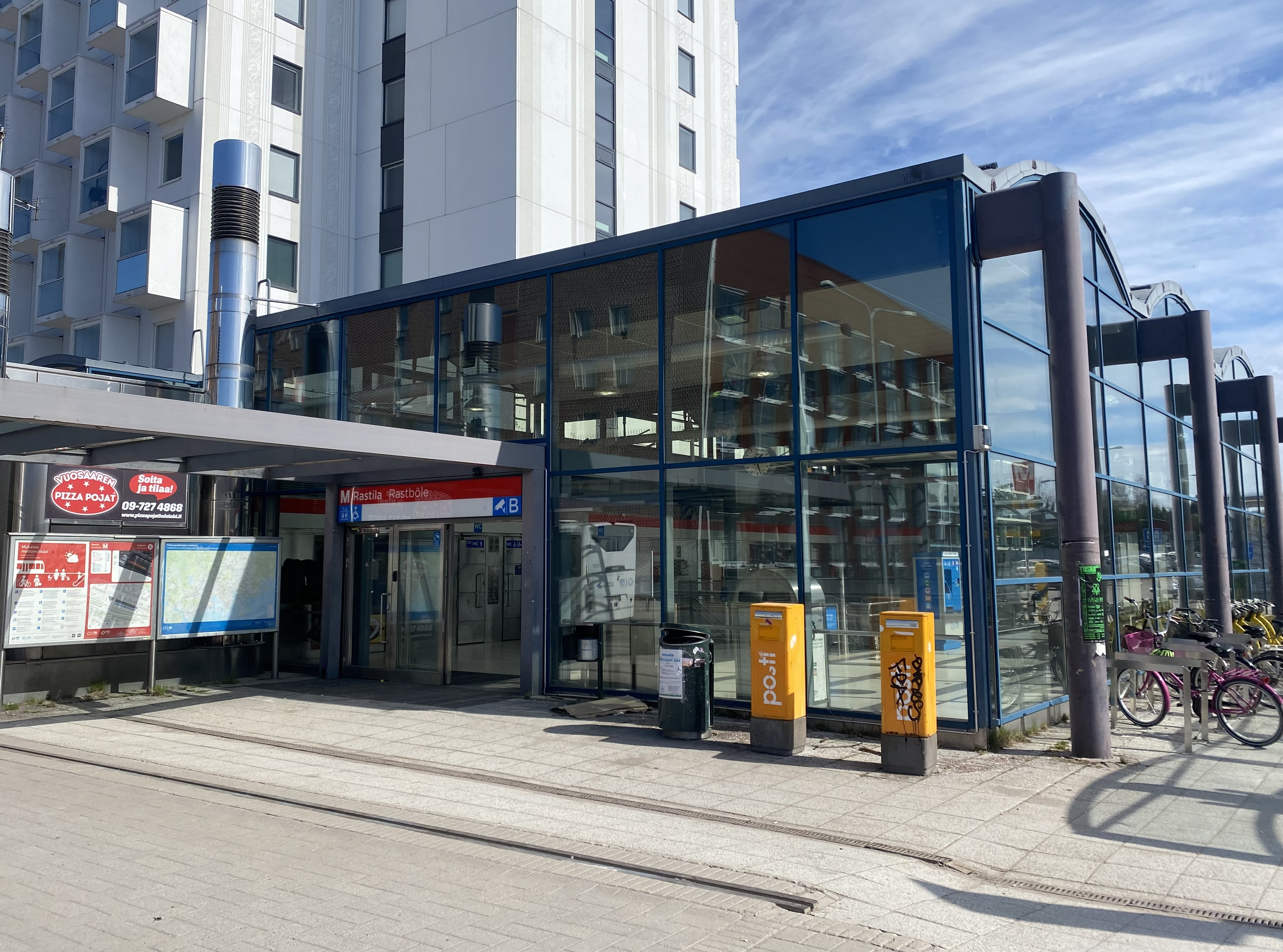
Western entrance

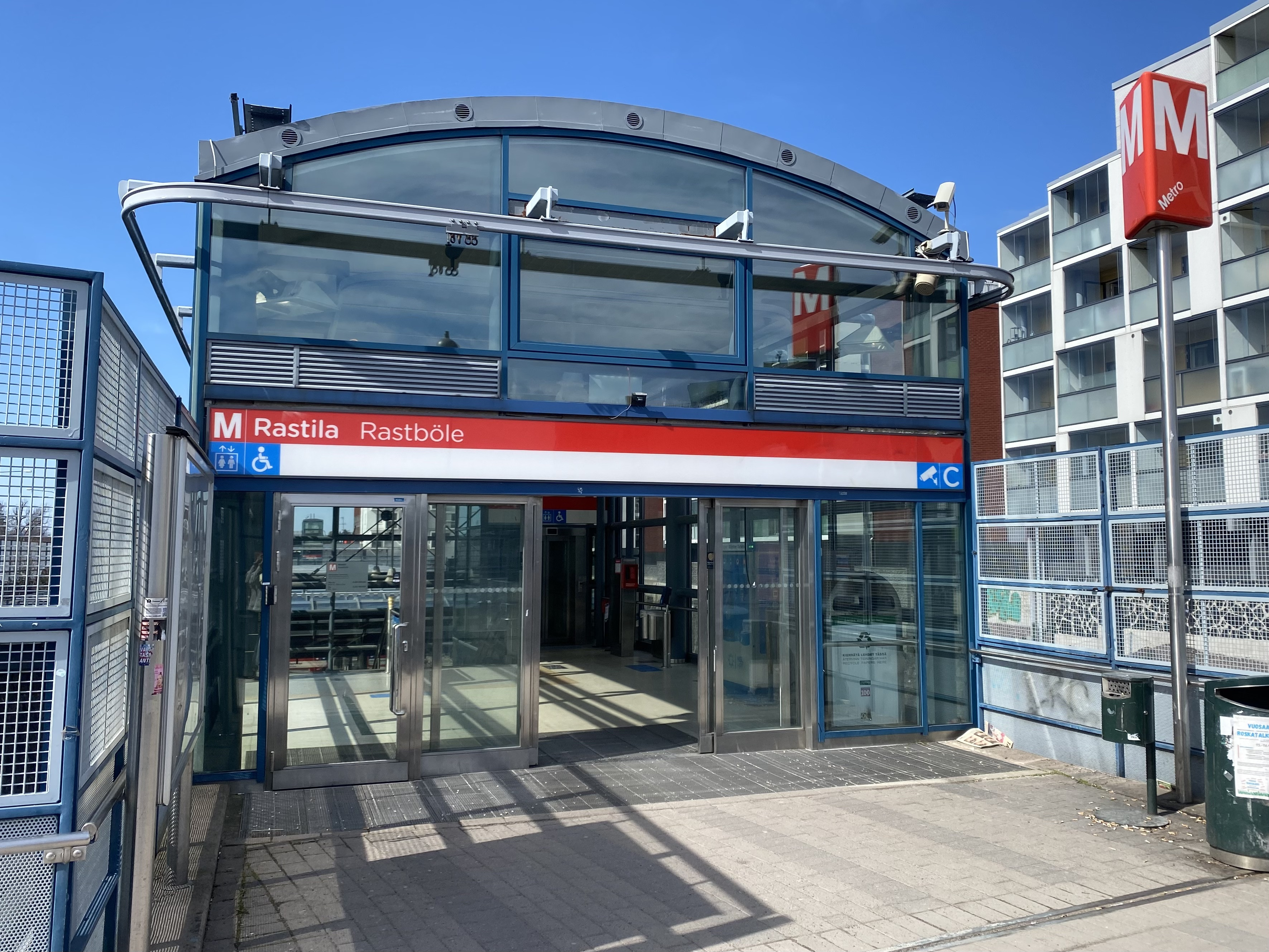
Eastern entrance
