= Vartioharju =

Coordinates: 60°13′N 25°06′E

Vartioharju (in Finnish) Botbyåsen (in Swedish)
- Neighborhood of Helsinki
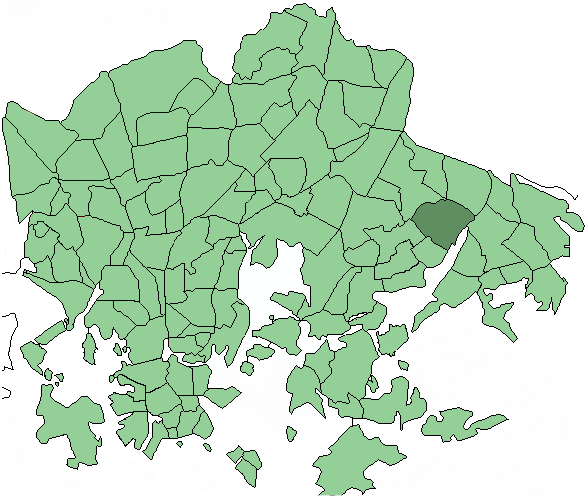
- Location in Helsinki
- Country: Finland
- Province: Southern Finland
- Region: Uusimaa
- Sub-region: Helsinki
- Time zone: UTC+2 (EET)
  - Summer (DST): UTC+3 (EEST)

Vartioharju (Finnish), Botbyåsen (Swedish) is an eastern neighborhood of Helsinki, Finland. It is a part of the Vartiokylä district.
