= Postal codes in Finland =

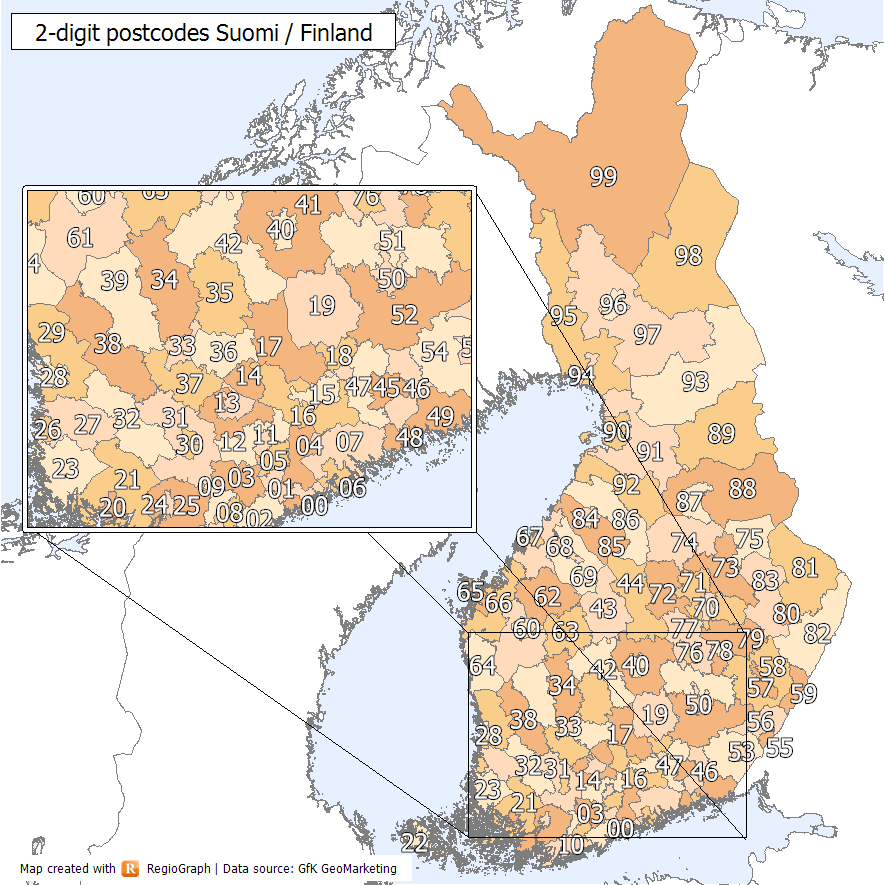
Two-digit postcode areas Finland

Finland has used five-digit numeric postal codes since the 1970s. The first and second digits designate the general area of the municipality of the address, while the last three designate a smaller region within that larger area. The numeric postal code is usually accompanied by a written name for the smaller region.

Corporations receiving large amounts of mail may have their own postal codes, also consisting of a five-digit numeric code and the name of the company.

A special postal code 99999 is used for the residence of the Finnish Joulupukki, Korvatunturi.
