= Itis shopping centre =

Itis
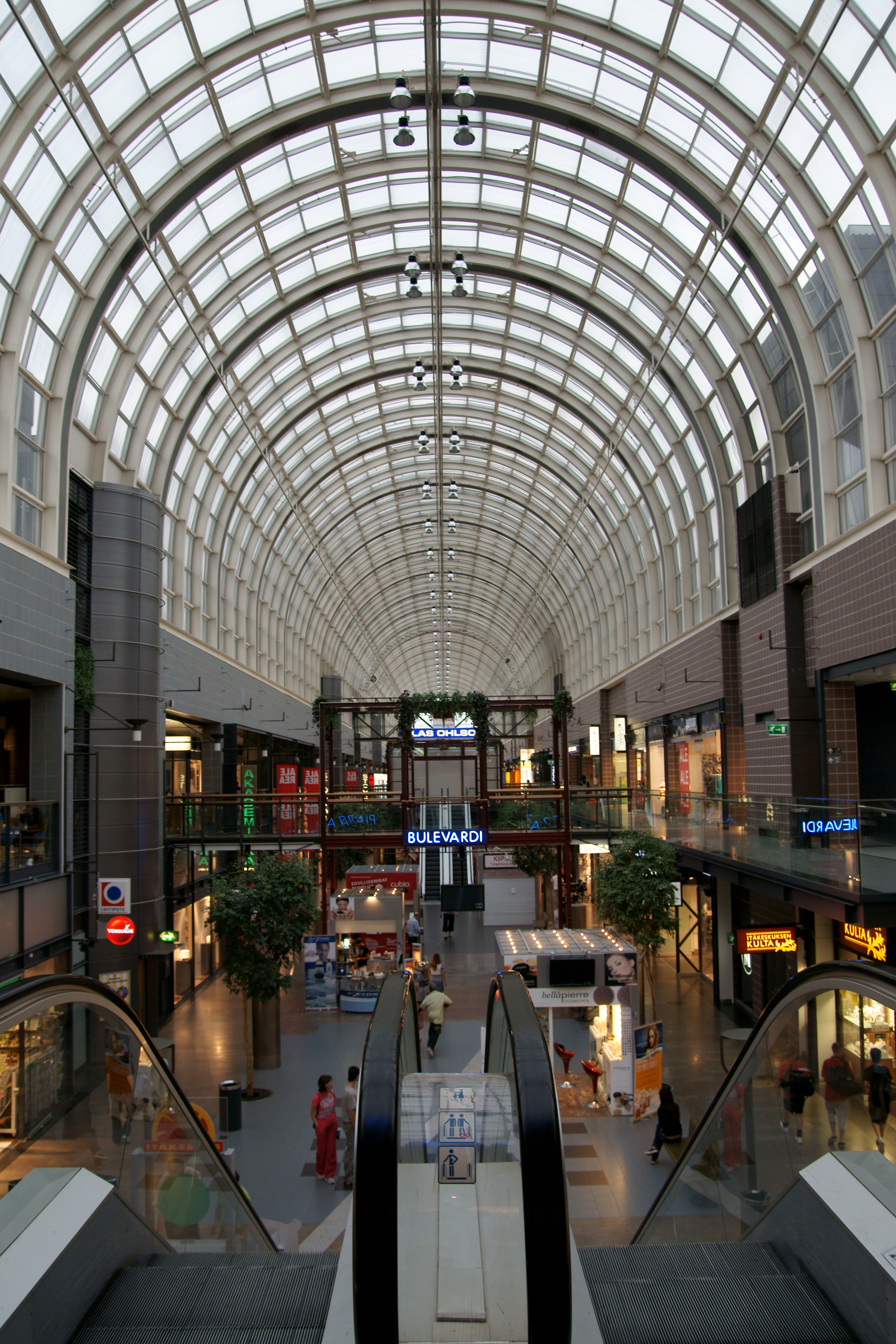
- Itis shopping centre - Bulevardi
- Location: Itäkeskus, Helsinki, Finland
- Coordinates: 60°12′40″N 25°4′53.5″E
- Opened: 1984–2001
- Owner: Morgan Stanley Real Estate Investing and CC Real
- Architect: Juhani Pallasmaa
- Num. of stores: > 150
- Num. of anchor tenants: 6
- Floor area: 81,218 m^{2} (874,220 sq ft)
- Floors: 5
- Parking: 3,000
- Public transit: Itäkeskus metro station
- Website: www.itis.fi/en

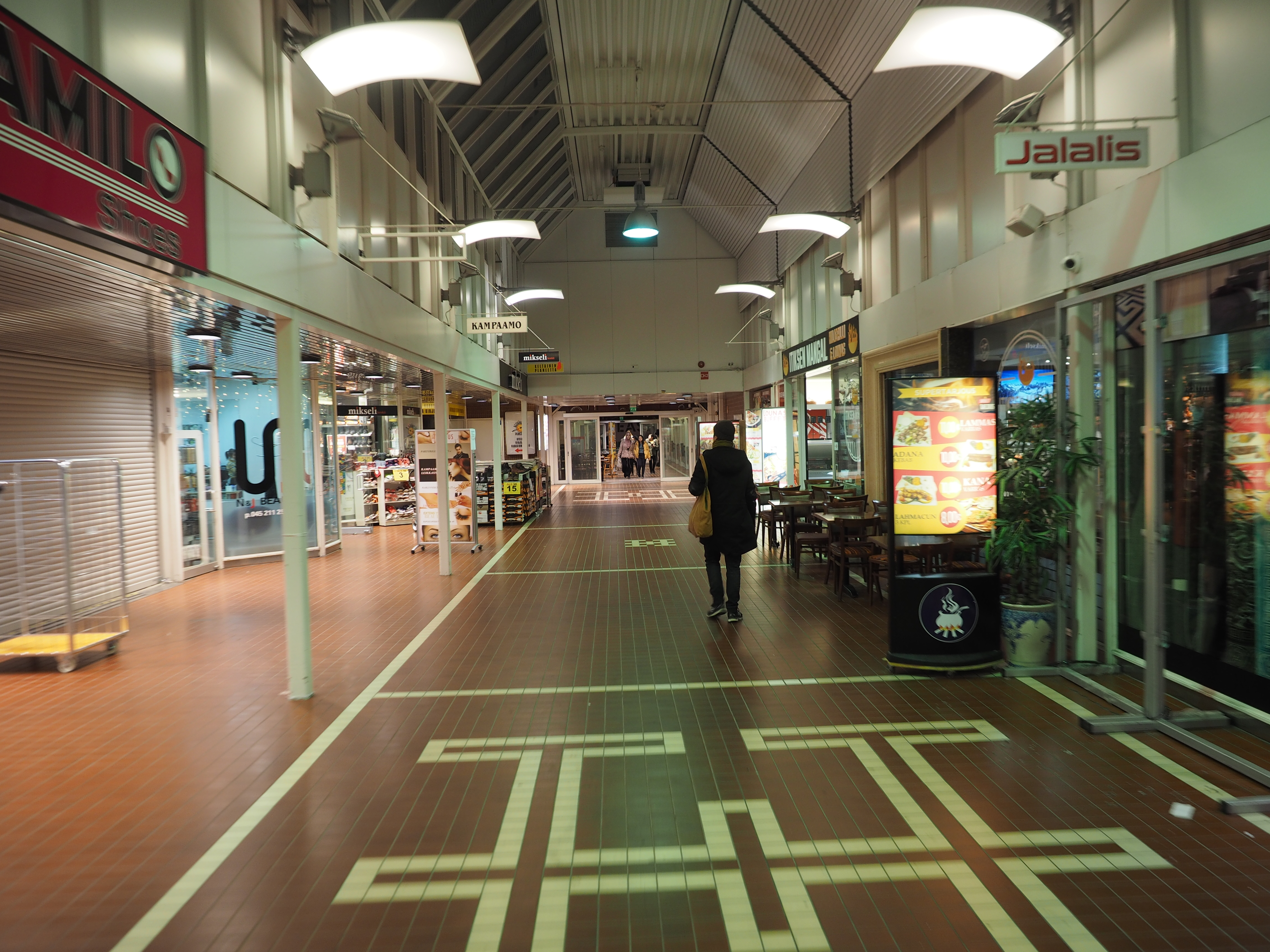
The Hansasilta bridge connects the Itis and Easton shopping centres.

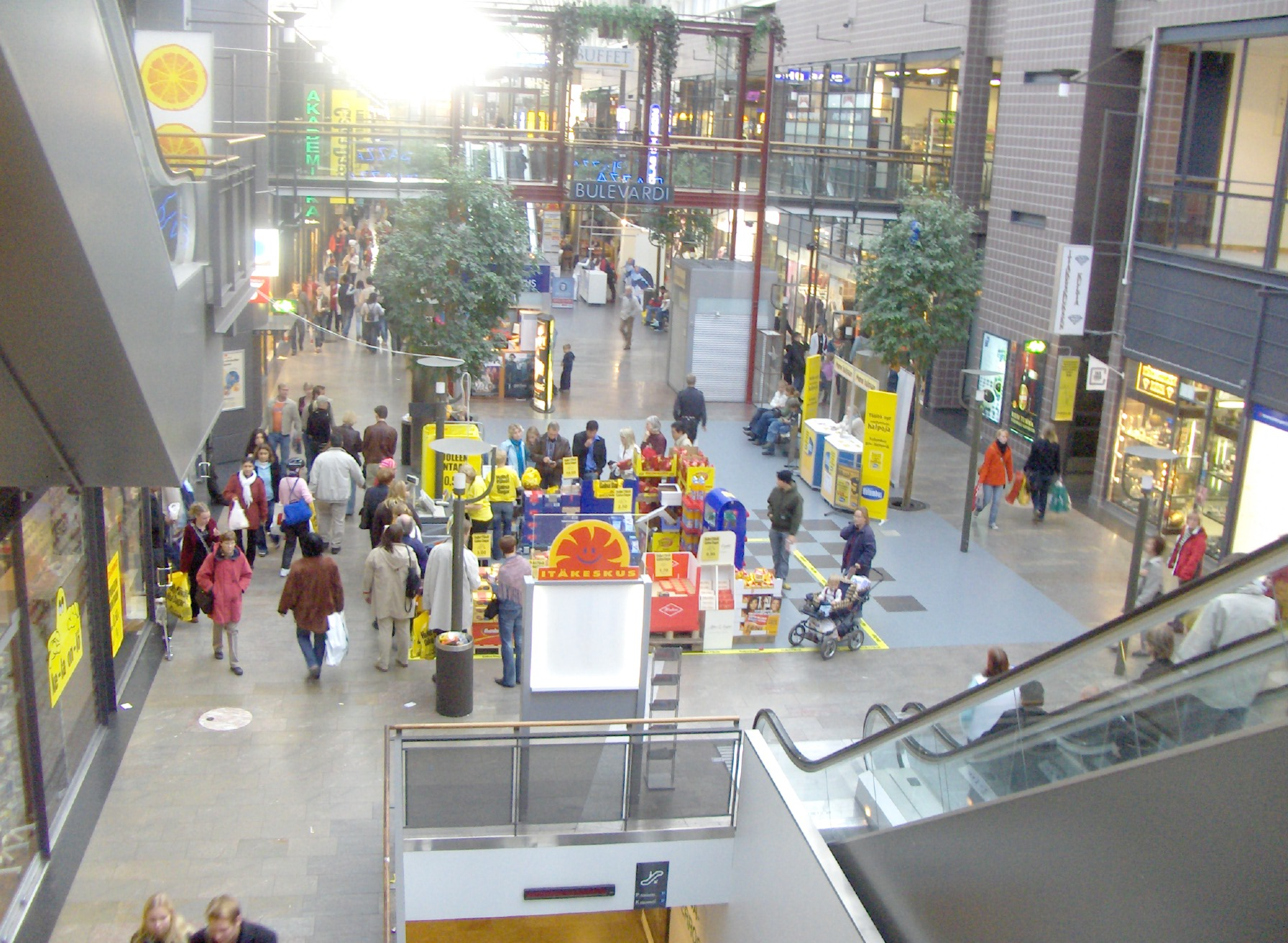
Itäkeskus shopping centre in 2005

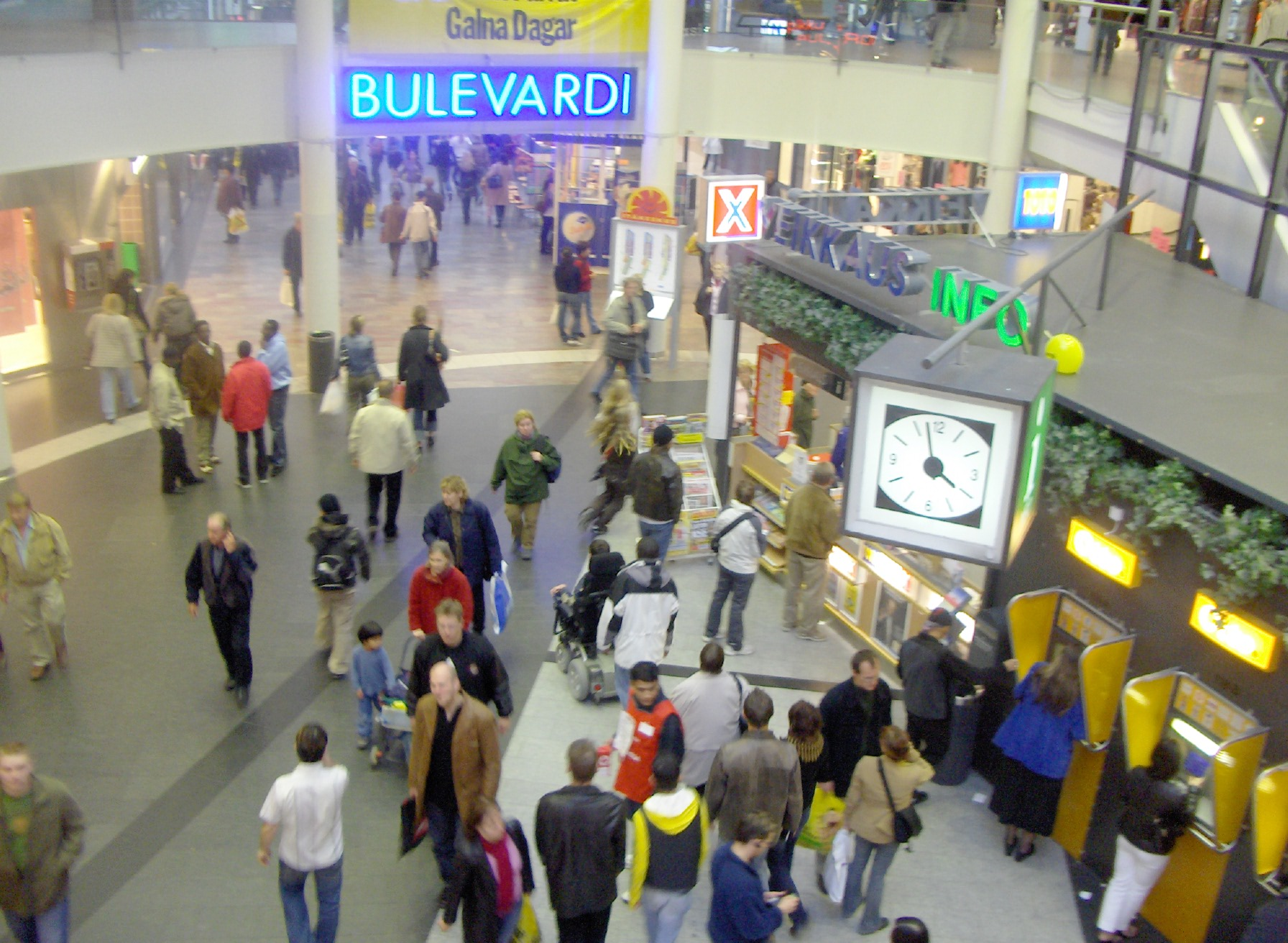
Itäkeskus shopping centre - Bulevardi in 2005

Itis (formerly Itäkeskus) is a shopping center located in Itäkeskus in East Helsinki. It is located next to the Itäväylä motorway and the Itäkeskus metro station. The mall has been refurbished a number of times, most recently in 2014, increasing the gross leasable area – including offices – to a total of 103,675 m^{2} (1,115,950 sq ft). It has a leasable retail area of 81,218 m^{2} (874,220 sq ft), containing more than 150 shops; including restaurants, cafés and grocery stores, which makes it the fourth-largest shopping centre in Finland. The mall has 3,000 parking spaces and approximately 18 million visitors annually.

The shopping centre was originally named Itäkeskus after the district, it was renamed Itis in March 2012. The name Itis had already previously been in use as the unofficial nickname for the shopping centre. The shopping centre was thoroughly renovated by the end of the year 2014.

The shopping centre is divided into four sections: Pasaasi (1984), Pikku-Bulevardi, Bulevardi (1992), and Piazza (2001). It has five floors, with the shops and other commercial services mainly concentrated on the first and second floors. The other floors are reserved mainly for parking and office space.

The shopping centre was built in three stages. The part now known as Pasaasi was completed in 1984 under the name Itämarket ('eastern market'), complete with the metro station and 41 shops. The new shopping centre proved successful, and an extension with 160 more shops (now Bulevardi and Pikku-Bulevardi) was built by September 1992. Another extension, known as Piazza, was opened in 2001. The following year, the property was sold by its owner Sponda Oyj to the Dutch company Wereldhave NV. Wereldhave sold Itis to the Morgan Stanley Real Estate Investing and CC Real on 2019.

The shopping centre is accessible by the Helsinki Metro. When coming from the city centre, the main entrance to the shopping centre is accessible directly from the Itäkeskus metro station. When coming from Vuosaari or Mellunmäki, the shopping centre is accessible across the Tallinnanaukio square. The anchor tenants of the shopping centre are Stockmann, S-market, Lidl, Halonen, Tokmanni, H&M, Lindex and Budget Sport. The shopping centre has both Finnish and foreign fashion shops. There are about 30 different restaurants and cafés in the shopping centre. Finnkino opened Finland's first commercial IMAX movie theatre in Itis on 30 November 2018.

== History ==
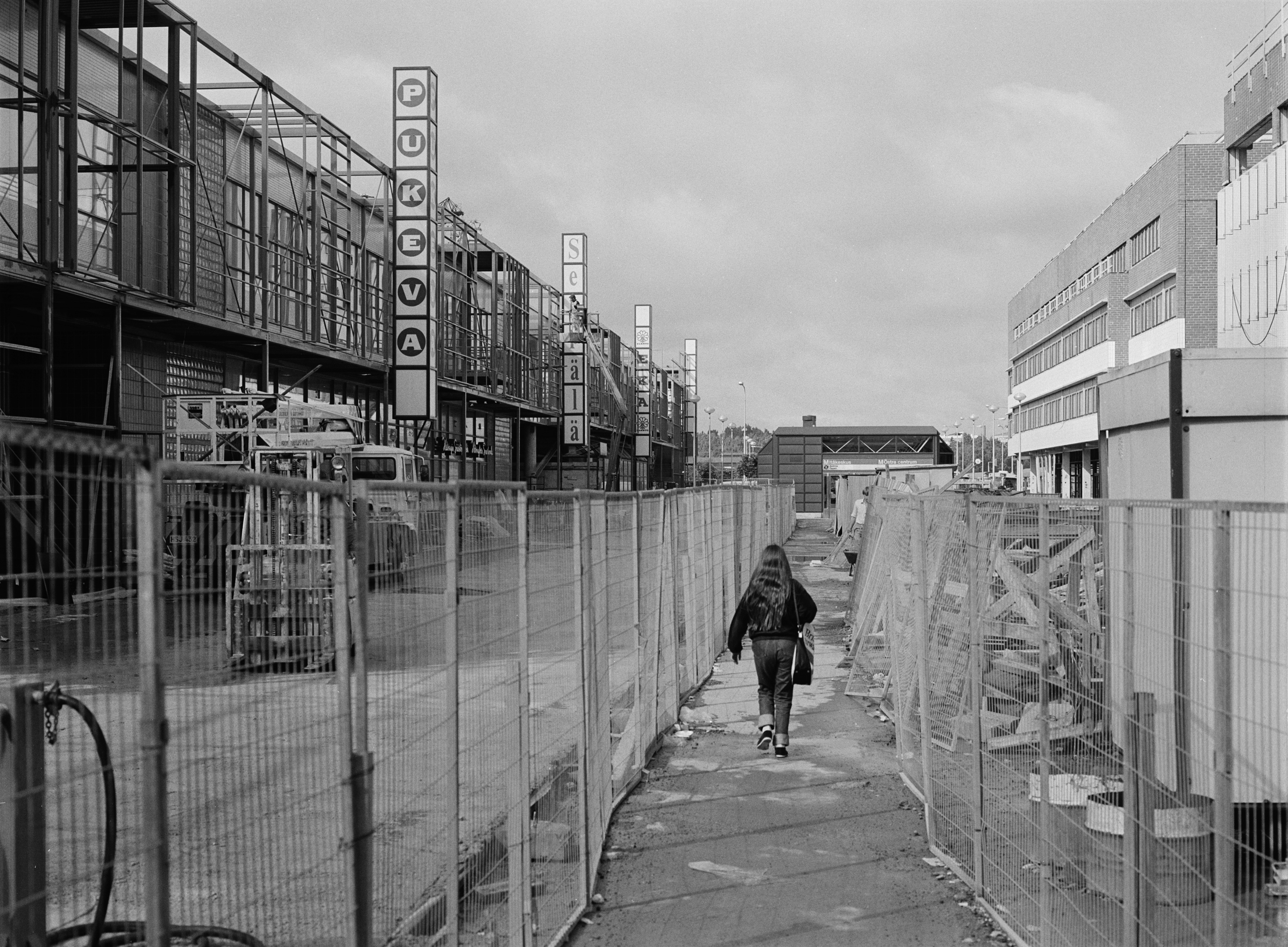
A picture of the Tallinnanaukio square during the construction of the shopping centre in 1984.

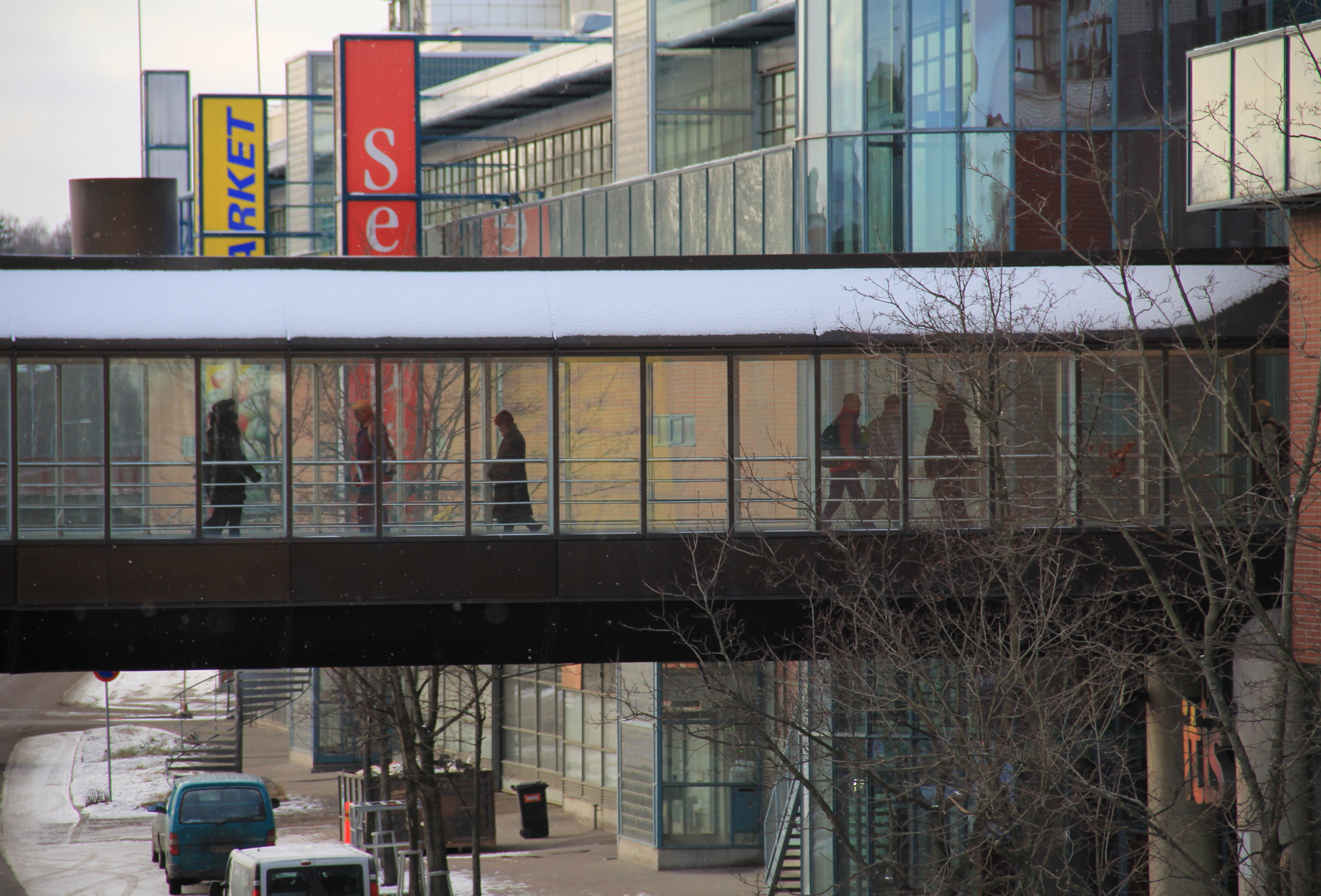
The Hansasilta bridge leads from the Itis shopping centre to the Easton Helsinki shopping centre over the street Itäväylä. The facade of the oldest part of Itis can be seen behind the bridge.

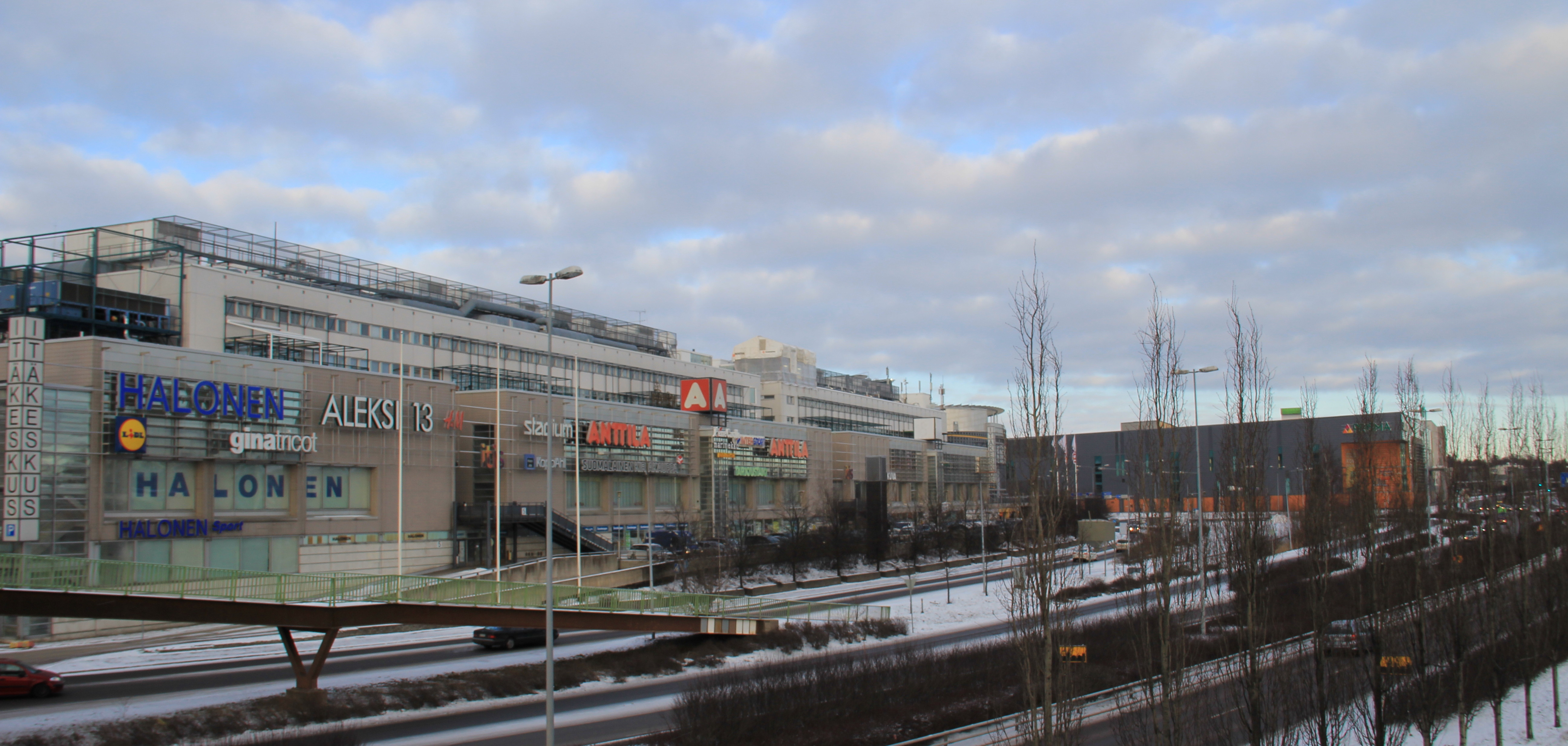
Facade of the 1992 expansion of Itis seen from the street Itäväylä.

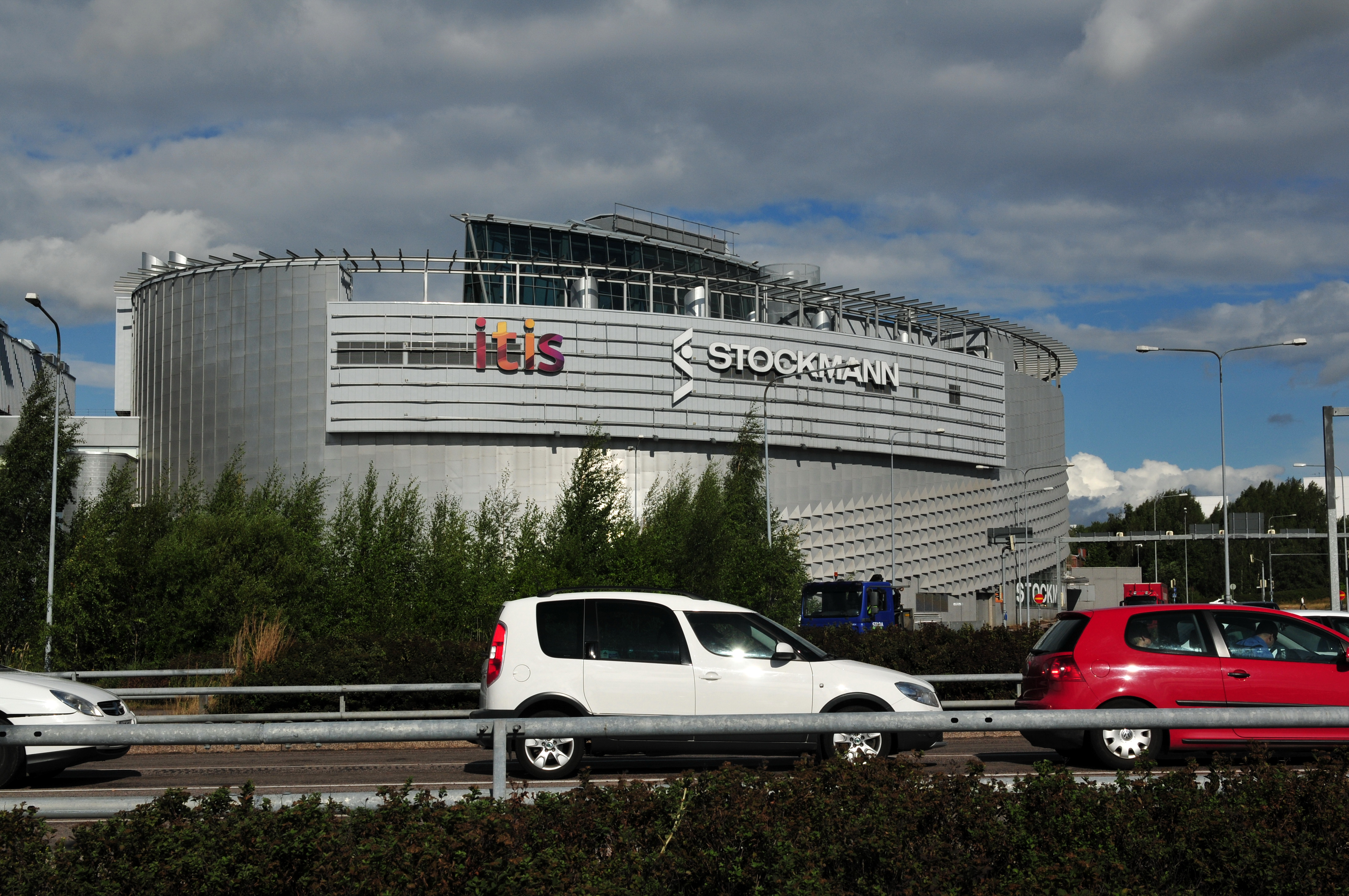
Facade of the 2001 expansion of Itis in 2014.

=== 1980s ===
The shopping centre was commissioned by the SKOP bank, which was also its original owner. The bank invested 200 million markka in the shopping centre. The first phase of the shopping centre facing the metro station was completed in autumn 1984 near the Puhos shopping centre in the area, and was designed by the architect Erkki Kairamo (Gullichsen, Kairamo, Vormala Arkkitehdit Ky) and built by the construction company Haka. The facade is not intended to promote cultural or historic references but is instead dominated by advertisements and business logos. The first phase, currently known as Pasaasi, had a surface area of 22 thousand square metres and contained 41 businesses, such as Anttila, Maxi, Pukeva and Seppälä.

The designers of the shopping centre and its environments were awarded the "Vuoden teräsrakenne" prize by the Finnish steel construction foundation twice in the 1980s. In 1984 the prize was awarded to architect Erkki Kairamo for the first phase of the shopping centre and in 1986 it was awarded to architects Sakari Aartelo and Esa Piironen for the Hansasilta covered bridge over the Itäväylä street.

=== 1990s ===
Soon after the inauguration of the shopping centre, design on its second phase started. The second phase was completed together with the renovation of the first phase designed as a joint venture by five architect bureaus (including Juhani Pallasmaa in the middle of the depression in late September 1992 and was named Bulevardi. True to its name, the second phase contains a boulevard 16 metres wide and almost 200 metres long with stone slabs, trees, benches, sculptures, fountains and curved glass roofs, and the business spaces were placed on both sides of the boulevard on two floors. The expansion increased the total floor area of the shopping centre to almost 85 thousand square metres, with new tenants including Stockmann, and bringing the total number of businesses to two hundred, making the Itis shopping centre into the largest shopping centre in the Nordic countries at the time. The Anttila store also moved to the second phase of the shopping centre, and a new bazaar-like square bordered by small businesses was made to replace the old premises of Anttila at the joint of the Bulevardi and Pasaasi parts.

The Maxi supermarket in the oldest end of the shopping centre was changed into a Valintatalo Plus grocery store in autumn 1996. In 2004 it was changed into an S-market grocery store because of the fusion of the Helsingin osuuskauppa and Elanto cooperatives. The first H&M fashion store in Finland was opened at the Itis shopping centre in August 1997.

=== 2000s ===
Design of a new phase at the end of the shopping centre facing the Kehä I beltway started in the late 1990s. The oval-shaped expansion named Piazza was opened in September 2001, bringing the shopping centre to its current size. A new public square suitable for concerts and other public events was built in a shallow hole at the centre of Piazza, surrounded by wooden stairs, terraces of restaurants and cafés and businesses on two floors. Foreign businesses, especially fashion and home decoration stores, having just arrived in Finland were opened there.

The shopping centre underwent thorough renovation from 2012 to 2014, its interior was made simpler and in March 2012 it was renamed Itis. The Itäkeskus store of the Stockmann department store chain moved to the Piazza space in November 2013. At first Stockmann had 12 thousand square metres of space on three floors. The top floor of the department store was changed into the largest Power home electronics store in August 2023, and the ethnic grocery store Alanya Market replaced the Stockmann Herkku grocery store in November 2023. The Itäkeskus Stockmann department store, now consisting of only one floor, was discontinued in summer 2025, after which it was replaced by Halonen and Budget Sport.

In November 2018 a Finnkino cinema was opened at the Itis shopping centre, built into the premises of the Anttila chain store that had gone bankrupt in 2016. The first Kentucky Fried Chicken restaurant in Finland was opened at the shopping centre on 11 November 2021. The shopping centre underwent thorough renovation again from 2022 to 2024. During the renovation, wooden railings were installed on the second floor of the shopping centre, and in July 2024 a new market hall was opened at the border between the first and middle phases of the shopping centre.

Both the sales and number of visitors at the Itis shopping centre have been on the rise. In 2018 the total sales of the shopping centre were 319 million euro and the number of visitors was 17.1 million.

== Traffic connections ==
The Itäkeskus metro station is located right next to the oldest and westernmost part of the shopping centre (Pasaasi) underneath the Tallinnanaukio square, and the shopping centre can be directly reached from the metro station when coming from the direction of Espoo and the city centre of Helsinki. When coming from the direction of Vuosaari or Mellunmäki the shopping centre can be reached through the Tallinnanaukio square. There is a bus terminal connected to the metro station, serving numerous metro connection bus lines as well as the Helsinki light rail line 15 to Keilaniemi via Oulunkylä and Leppävaara, the trunk bus line 500 to Munkkivuori via Pasila and routes perpendicular to Kehä I to places including Pitäjänmäki and the Westendinasema bus station in Westend as well as to the Helsinki-Vantaa Airport via Malmi and the Jumbo shopping centre and to Kivistö. There are also bus lines to Sipoo. The shopping centre can be reached by car from Kehä I, Itäväylä or Meripellontie.

== Ownership ==
The expansion of Itis in the late 1980s was financed by the SKOP bank. After the Bank of Finland acquired the bank in autumn 1991 its properties were transferred to the Sponda corporation founded by the Bank of Finland. In January 2002 Sponda sold the shopping centre to the Dutch property investment company Wereldhave N.V. for 317 million euro. In 2012 Wereldhave Finland owned 84% of Itis, Kesko owned 15% and the city of Helsinki owned 1%. In October 2018 Wereldhave sold the shopping centre to the American company Morgan Stanley.

The Hansasilta bridge is owned by the city of Helsinki and the property of the adjacent Easton Helsinki shopping centre on the other side of the Itäväylä street is owned by Kesko.

== Protection ==
The Finnish society for construction arts has made a proposition to the Economic Development Centre of Uusimaa to protect the old part of the Itis shopping centre. The Economic Development Centre recommends the protection of the facades by a change to the zoning plan. The background for this is the shopping centre's intent to fix the steel structure. According to teacher of cultural history Kristo Vesikanta, the appearance off the building is based on steel structure. The basic appearance of Kairamo's architecture is based on clearness and a boxy structure, which is enhanced by outside stairways, balconies and advertisement devices. The city museum of Helsinki requires preservation of the colour image in its statement.

== See also ==
- Hertsi
- Tallinnanaukio
