= The Finnish Institute in France =

Coordinates: 48.8503°N 2.3431°E

The Finnish Institute in France, Institut finlandais, is an independent and multidisciplinary platform between Finland and France. The institute was opened in 1990 at 60 Rue des Écoles, in Quartier Latin in the 5th arrondissement in Paris. The institute is open to everyone and the entry is free.

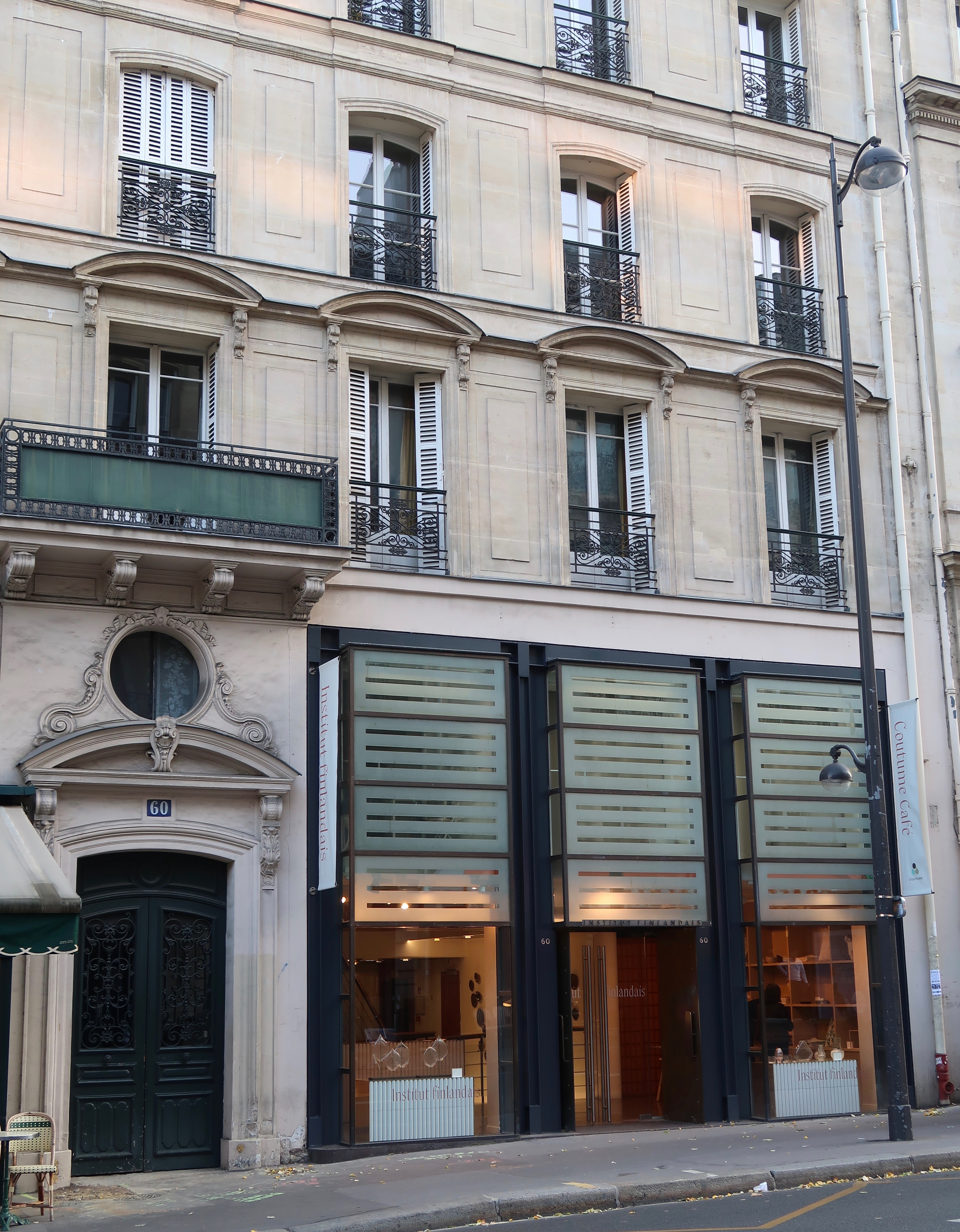
The facade of Institut finlandais.

== Presentation of The Finnish Institute in France ==
=== The building ===
The building of the institute represents the Haussman architecture and dates back to 1862. Designed by a Finnish architect Juhani Pallasmaa. The facilities of the institute are located in a former movie theatre, Cinéma Cluny-Écoles, which closed in 1985. Institut finlandais is an international meeting place and platform presenting the Finnish culture, know-how and society. The premises were renewed during a major renovation in 2017–2018, led by architect Pekka Littow's Littow architectes, and opened again to the public in July 2018. Studio Joanna Laajisto designed the interior decorations.

The institute's facilities are owned by the Finnish government and host a multi-purpose hall with 195 seats, a gallery, a 60-seat auditorium, and a seminar room. Located on rue des Écoles, the gallery provides a showcase for Finnish art and design, while the auditorium on the ground floor offers regular film series as well as discussions, meetings and events. The Café Maa is located in the Great Hall, which combines art exhibitions and events with sustainable gastronomy in an inviting atmosphere. Café Maa promotes Finnish food culture and provides a platform for creatives to showcase their work to a wide audience in Paris.

=== Management ===
The current director of Institut finlandais is Tuula Yrjö-Koskinen who started as the director in August 2023.

Former directors of Institut finlandais include:

- Johanna Råman (2018-2023)
- Meena Kaunisto (2012-2018)
- Marja Sakari (2008-2012)
- Marjatta Levanto (2004-2008)
- Jukka Havu (2001-2004)
- Iiris Schwank (1999-2000)
- Kimmo Pasanen (1996-1999)
- Tarmo Kunnas (1990-1996, the first director of the institute)

=== Missions and operations ===
In collaboration with different international institutions, academia and creatives, Institut finlandais engages actively with critical discourse through onsite and off-site programming. Through their activities, Institut finlandais seeks to explore how a cultural framework can foster international conversations in creative fields, such as design, fashion, architecture, cinema and performing arts.

The core activities of the Institut finlandais are funded by the Finnish Ministry of Education and Culture. The projects of the Institut are also financed by different private foundations and organizations.

== See also ==
- Finland
