= Easton Helsinki =

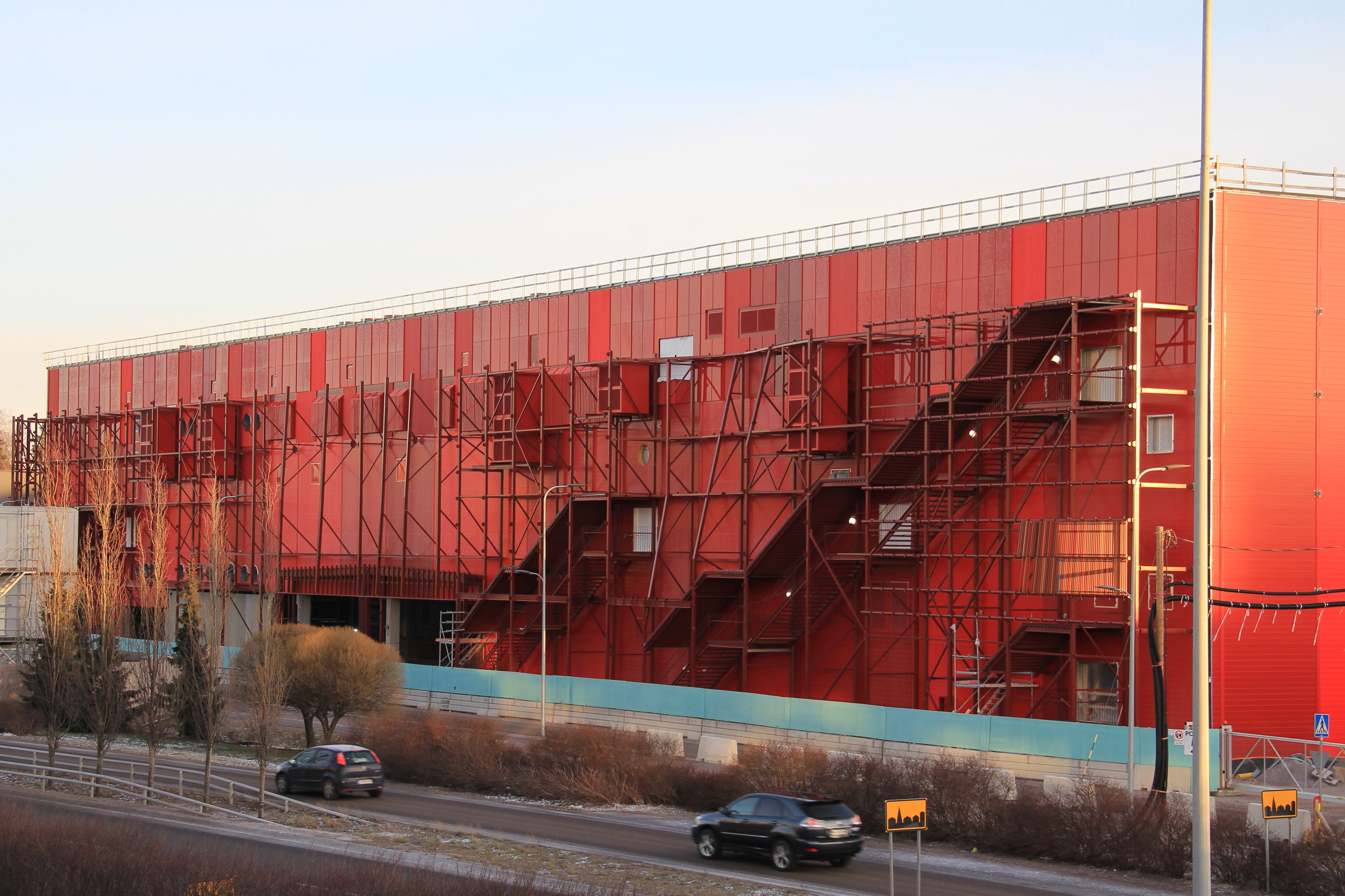
- The facade of Easton Helsinki facing Itäväylä under construction.
- Location: Itäkeskus, Helsinki, Finland
- Coordinates: 60°12′36.6″N 25°5′07.4″E
- Opened: 26 October 2017 (first part)
- Owner: Kesko
- Floors: 5
- Website: eastonhelsinki.fi

Easton Helsinki is a shopping centre in Itäkeskus, Helsinki, Finland. It is connected to the Itis shopping centre through the Hansasilta bridge. Easton Helsinki is built in phases, and its first part was opened on 26 October 2017. There is an option to expand the shopping centre by building a second part, but no decision of building it has been made yet.

== Shops ==
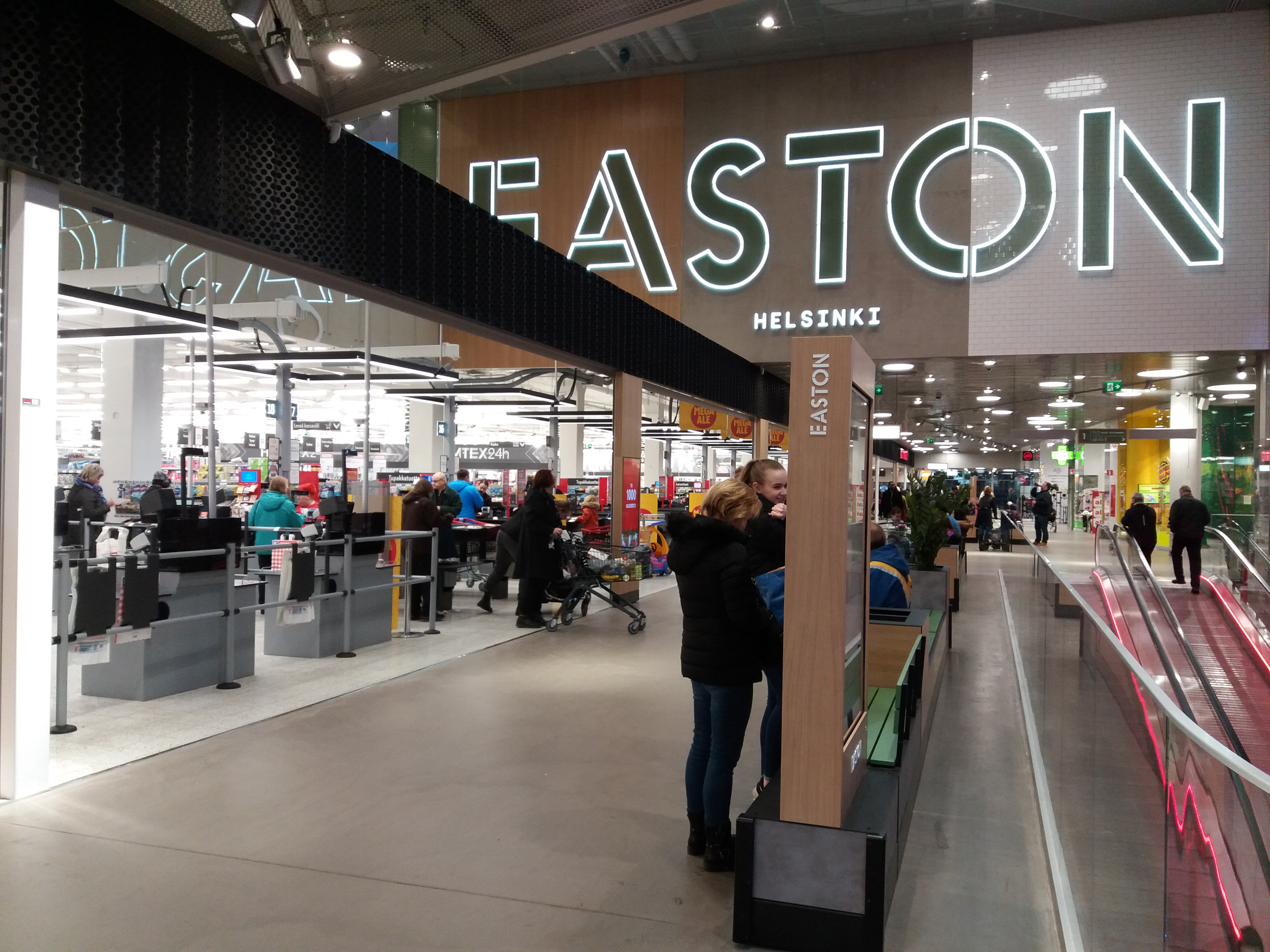
Interior of Easton Helsinki.

The first part of Easton Helsinki contains over 30 shops. The anchor tenant of the shopping centre is the Kesko chain's K-Citymarket shop, which originally opened in Itäkeskus in 1977. The shopping centre also contains an Alko branch, a pharmacy, Musti ja Mirri, a Perusterveys health care clinic and many restaurants.

== History ==
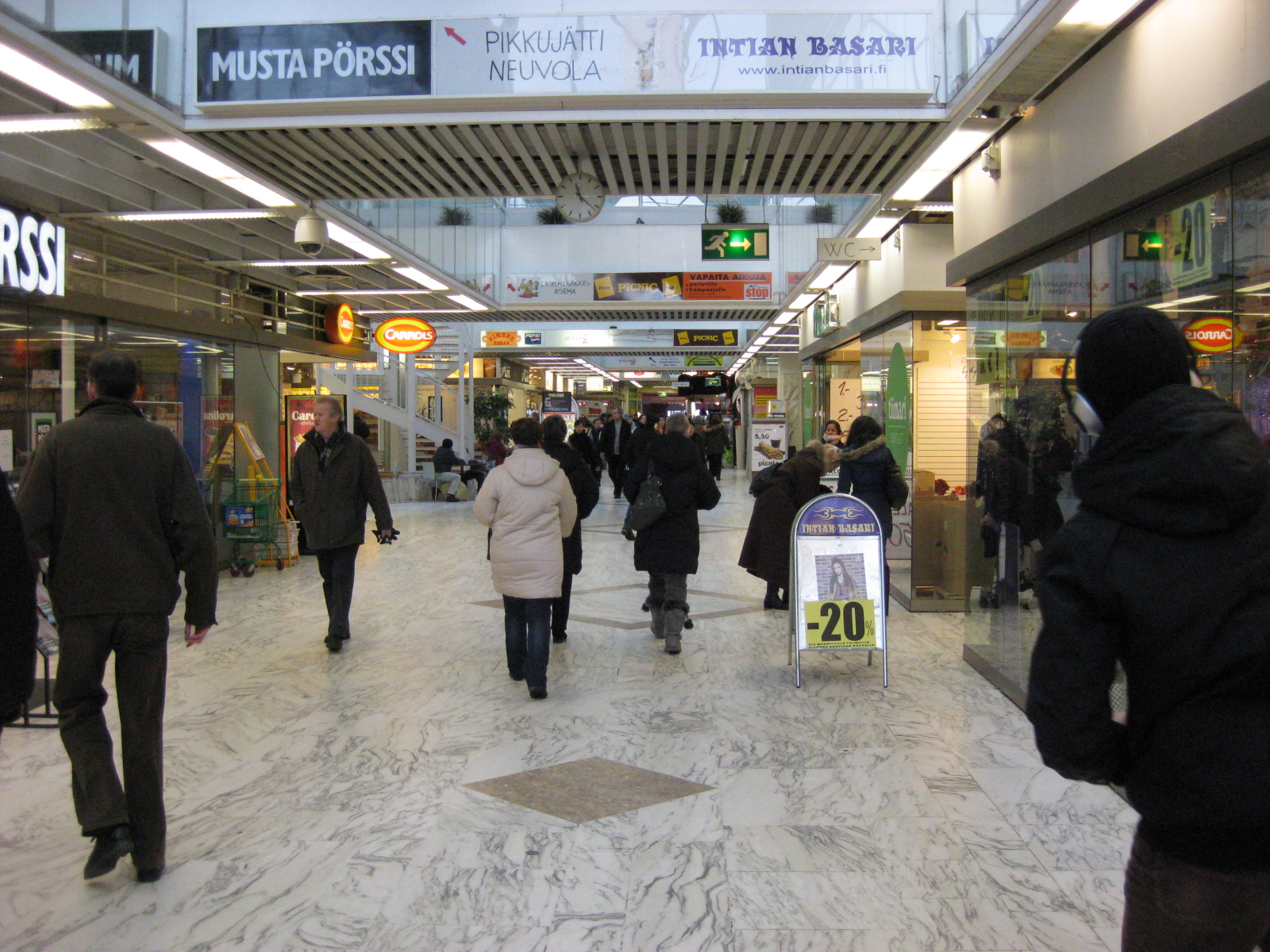
Interior of City-Jätti facing towards the Itis shopping centre.

The Hansakäytävä passageway in Easton Helsinki was known as City-Jätti before the 2017 renovation. City-Jätti contained K-Citymarket and a pharmacy, Kimene Kebab, a home bakery and Saiturinpörssi among others. The future of Hansakäytävä depends on the implementation of the second part of the Easton renovation.

Easton Helsinki was originally planned to have an IMAX movie theatre as its main attraction, but it was built in the Itis shopping centre instead.
