= The Bat of Minerva =

Cable TV show of Twin Cities, Minnesota

The Bat of Minerva, a regional cable television show based in the Twin Cities of Minneapolis and St. Paul, engages people in conversation about their lives and ideas. The late night show is produced and directed by philosopher Peter Shea, who interviews participants from behind the camera. The director describes the show as a place to provoke discussion among adults and obtain pleasure from conceptual conversation. Past guests of the show have included scholars, artists, journalists, and thoughtful people in many different life situations, such as an assistant zookeeper, a historical re-enactor, an attorney, a furniture business owner, and a gardener. The name of the show harkens to Hegel’s observation that “Only when the dusk starts to fall does the owl of Minerva spread its wings and fly.”

== Programming history ==
Peter Shea founded The Bat of Minerva in 1995. The show has since run a regular Sunday midnight spot on Metro Cable Network Channel 6 in the Twin Cities. Some distinguished past guests include Eugene McCarthy, Morton Subotnick, Juliet Schor, Stacy Alaimo, Leigh Fondakowski, Lawrence Venuti, Leonard Marcus, and Juhani Pallasmaa.

In 2006 The Bat of Minerva began to collaborate with Institute for Advanced Study at University of Minnesota to interview scholars and artists visiting or associated with the Institute. The Institute archives the show on its website for public viewing.

In 2010 The Bat of Minerva videotaped the University of Minnesota course “Oil and Water: The Gulf Oil Spill of 2010” and offered the lectures online through the Institute. In 2011 The Bat of Minerva held a special interview series in response to the March 2011 Tōhoku earthquake and tsunami in Japan and the 2011 Mississippi River floods. In 2012 and 2013 Peter Shea did a series of interviews on Minnesota food producers, interviewing farmers, activists, food shelf operators, restaurant owners and workers, and others concerned with the production of food in southwest Minnesota. Shea has also begun a series of interviews with prominent electronic musicians.
