= Maamerkki =

High-rise building in Helsinki, Finland

Coordinates: 60°12′30.3″N 25°04′58.2″E

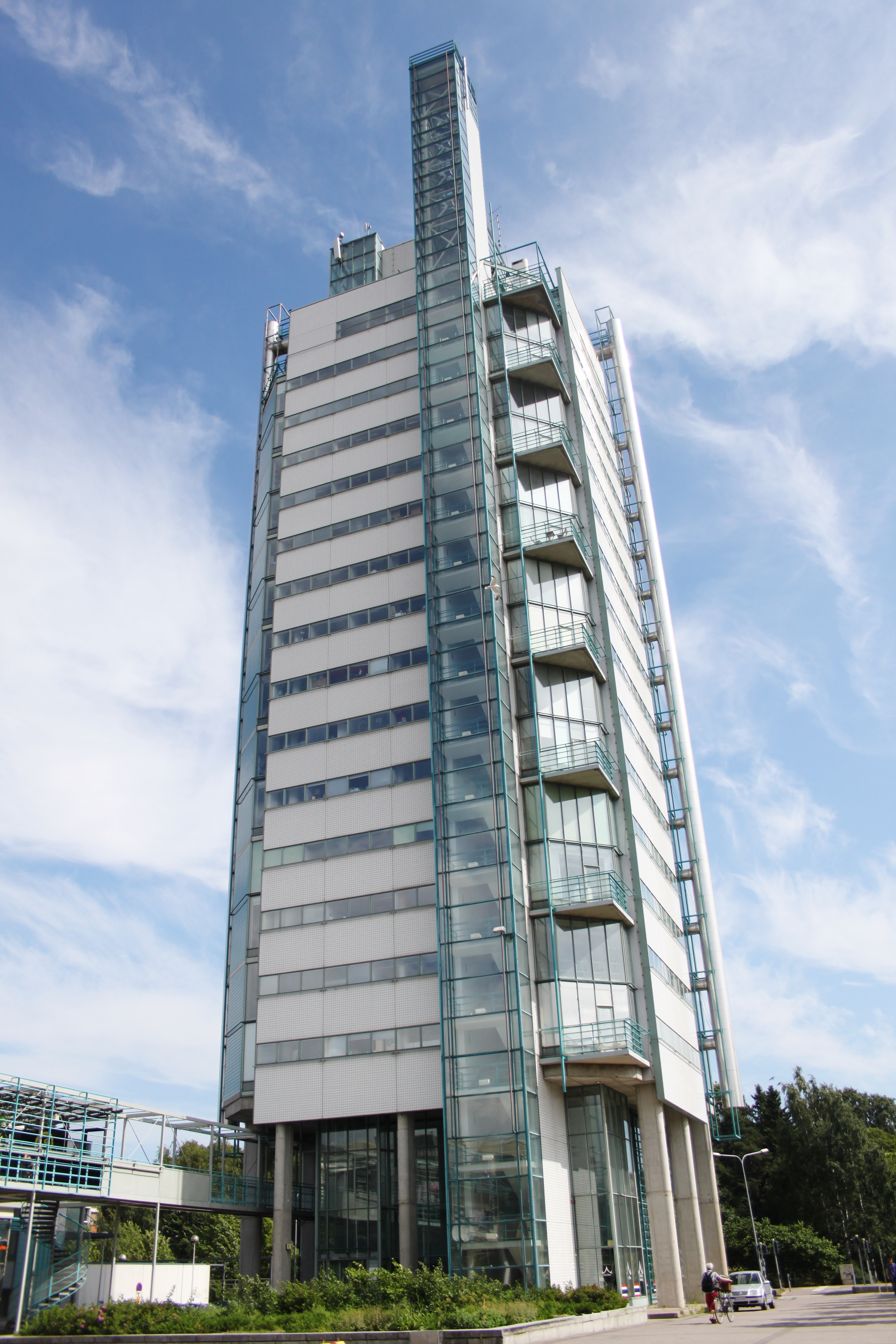
Maamerkki in July 2011.

Maamerkki (Finnish for "landmark") is a high-rise building on Kauppakartanonkatu street near the Lyypekinaukio square in Itäkeskus in the Vartiokylä district of Helsinki, Finland. The building is 82 metres high and has 19 floors and has a viewing terrace at the top. The building was completed in 1987 and was designed by architect Erkki Kairamo. The building currently has over 50 apartments and several businesses.

Maamerkki is currently the twelfth highest high-rise building in Finland and the eight tallest highest in Helsinki. In spring 2014, the building was renamed Helmitorni ("pearl tower").

== Architecture ==
The 82-metre-high glassed staircase is one of the most distinctive marks of the facade of the building. Together with the glass beacon on top of the tower, they have formed a large-scale suprematist cross. The staircase reaching for the skies emphasises the height of the building. To achieve this, the air conditioning channels leading up to the roof were placed outside the structure of the building. With these architectural solutions, the shape of the building is quite slender.

The construction company Haka held an architectural competition in 1977 to build the building. The competition was won by the architecture bureau Gullichsen, Kairamo, Voimala Arkkitehdit Ky with their suggestion Valomerkki ("light signal"). From its completion up to 2006 it was the tallest building in Helsinki, a "spike" standing out from the Helsinki skyline. The glassed staircase outside the building is lit during the dark. The structure of the building was cast in place from concrete and the facade is made of cement clinker.

The owner of the building sought permission in autumn 2013 to convert floors 4 through 17 of the building into apartments.

== Gallery ==
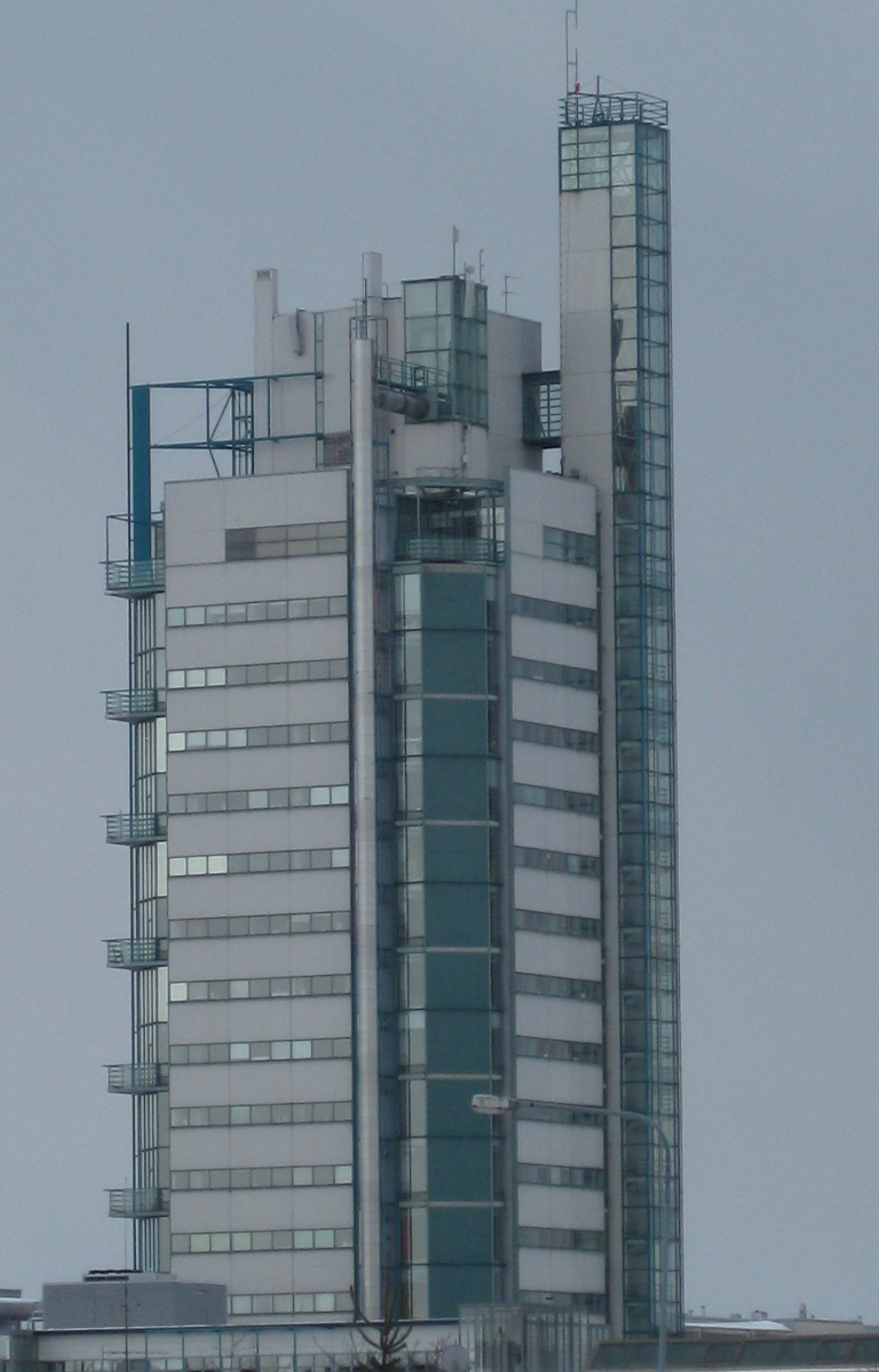
Maamerkki seen from the intersection of Itäväylä and Ring I

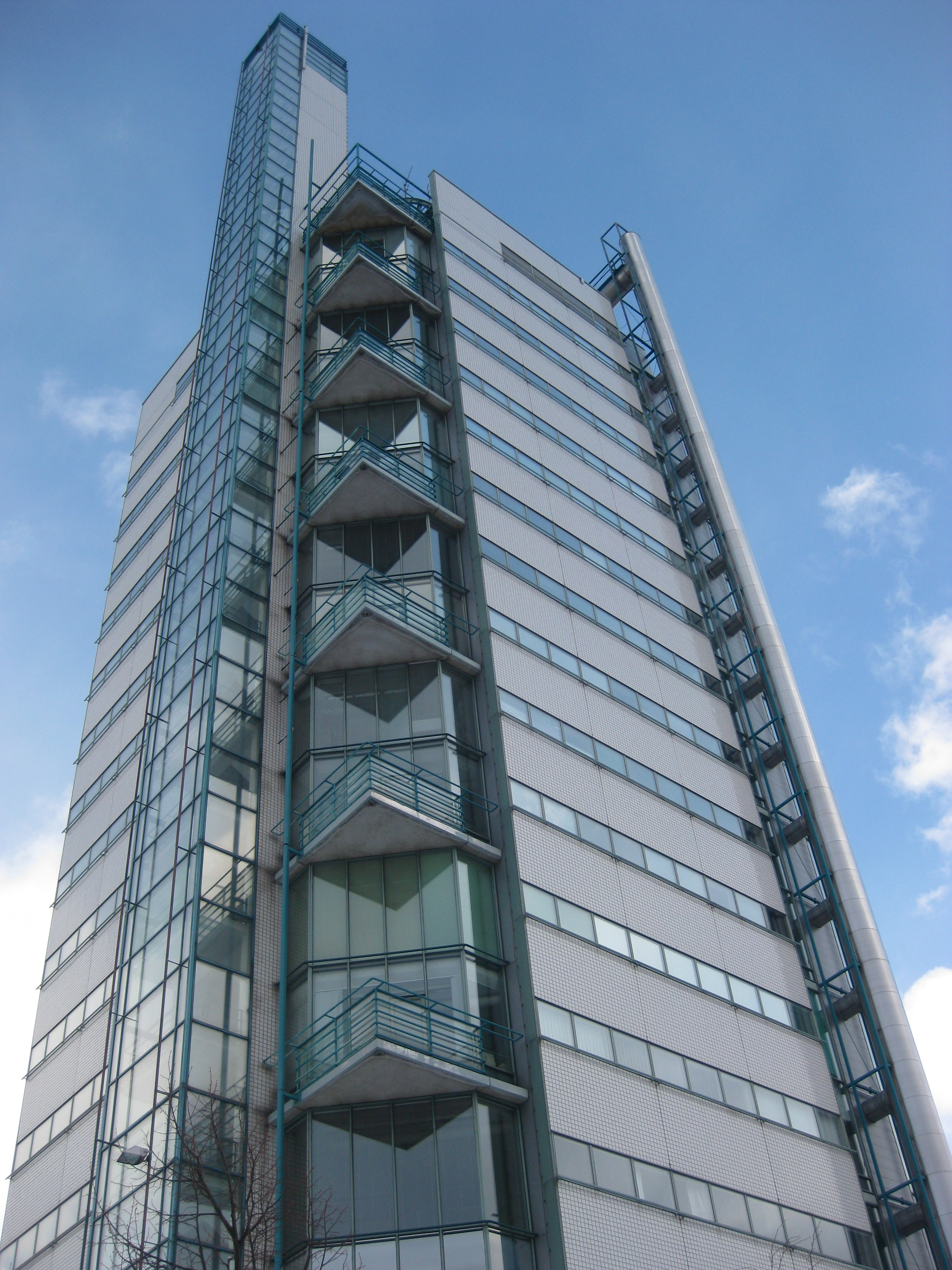
Maamerkki seen from Lyypekinaukio

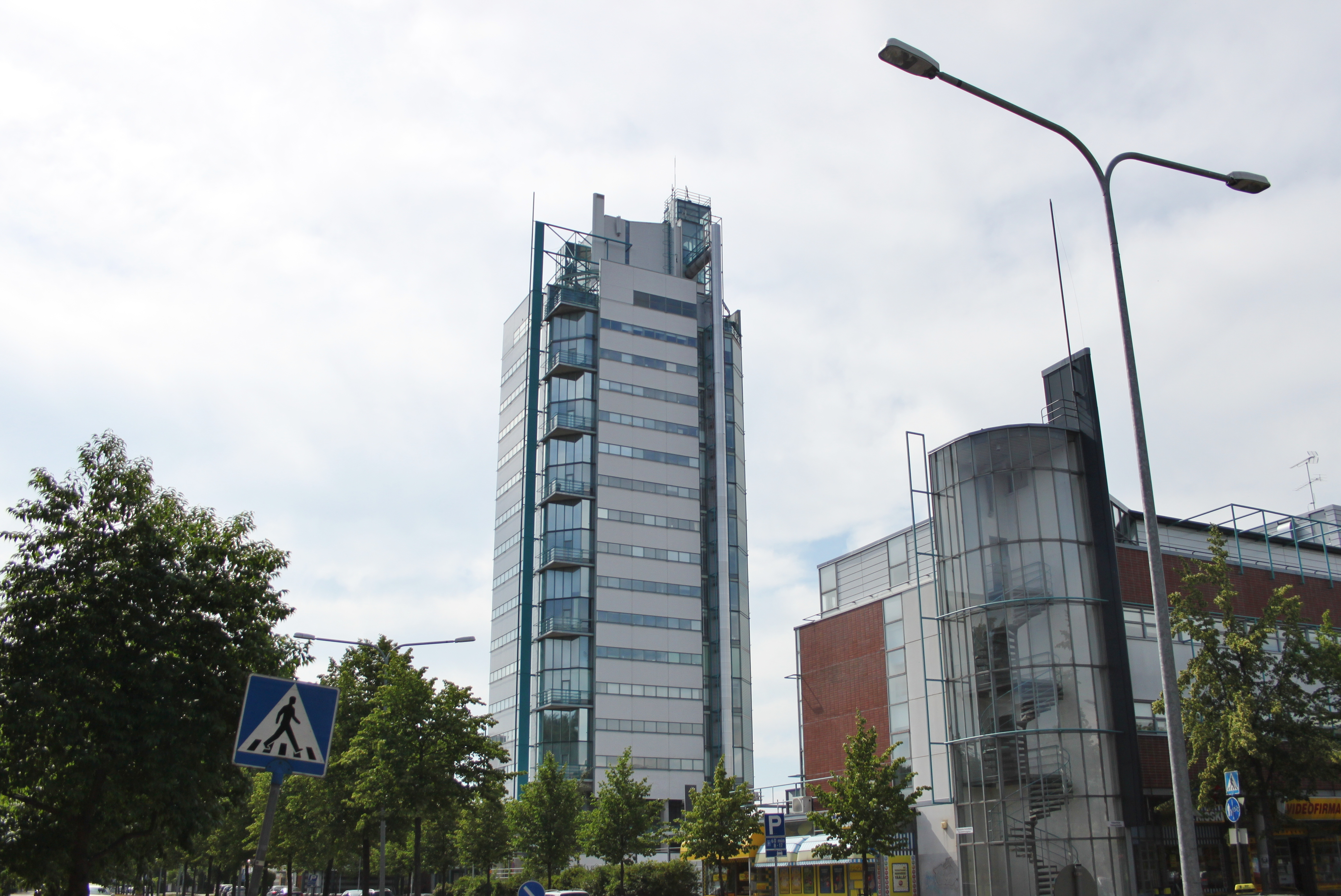
Maamerkki seen from Kauppakartanonkatu

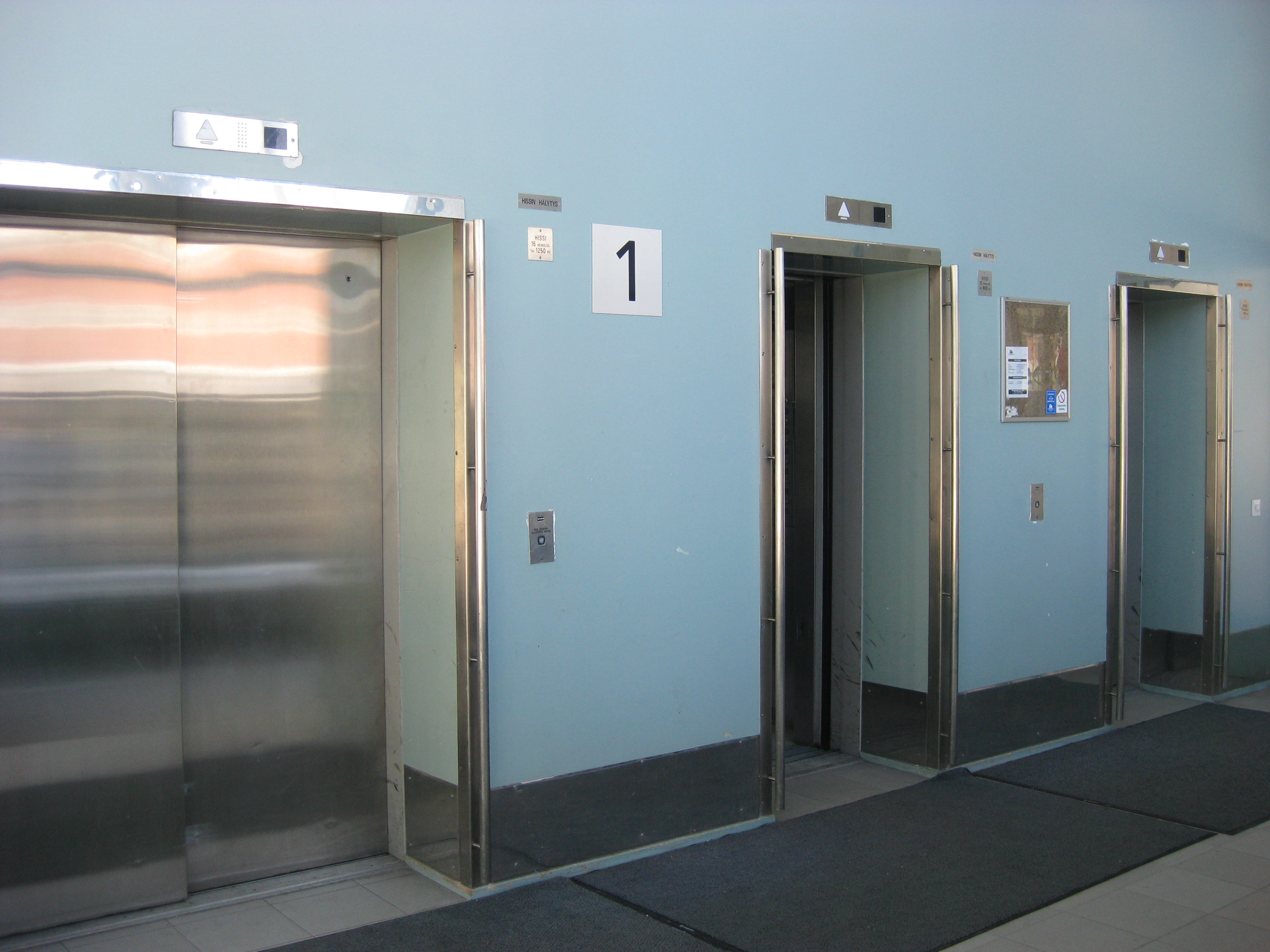
The lobby at the ground floor of Maamerkki

== See also ==
- List of tallest buildings in Finland
