= Tallinnanaukio =

Square in Helsinki, Finland

Coordinates: 60°12′38.4″N 25°04′46.2″E

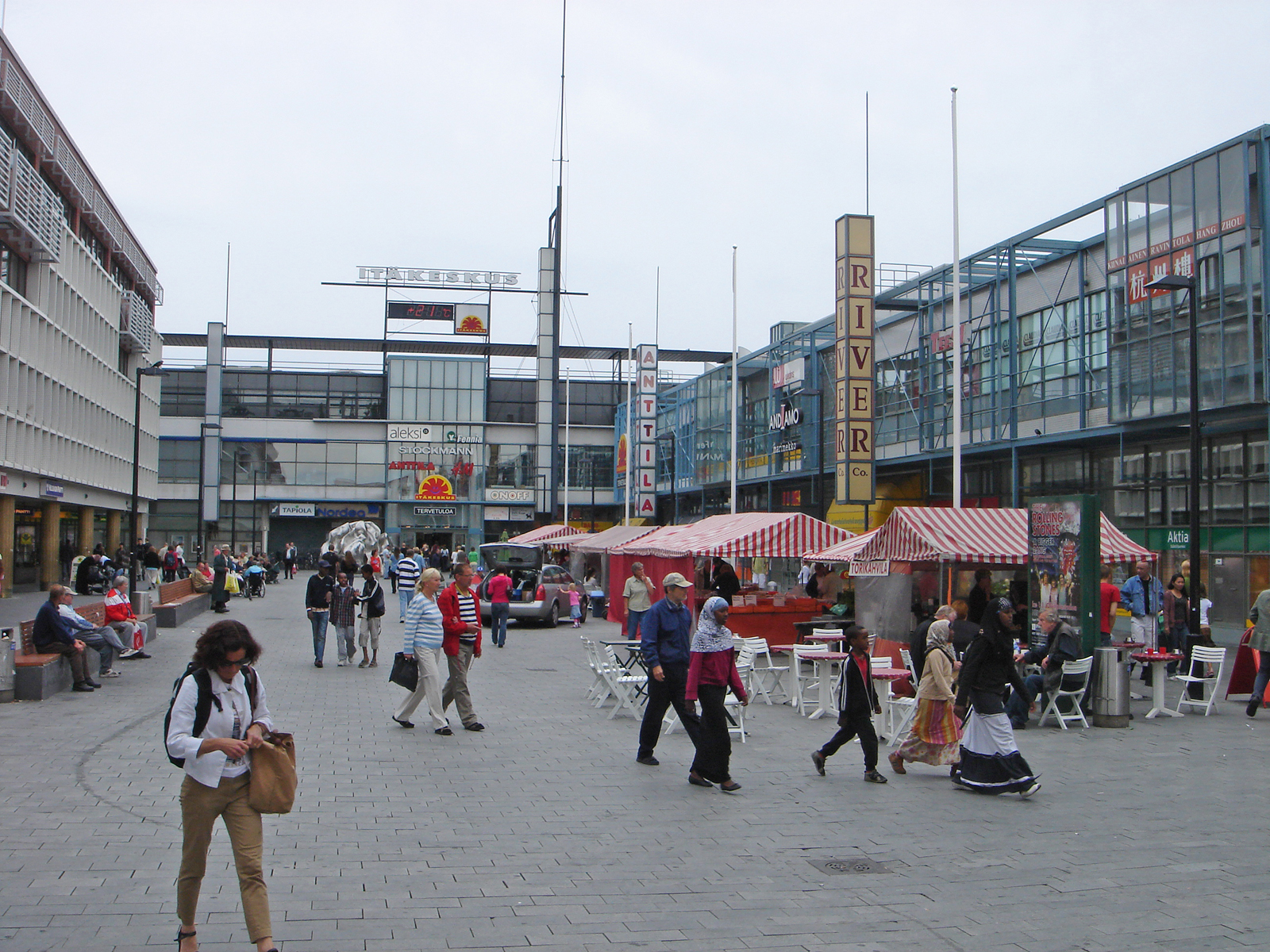
Tallinnanaukio in 2010

Tallinnanaukio (literally "Tallinn Square"; Swedish: Revalsplanen, literally "Reval Square") is a square in the Itäkeskus quarter in Helsinki, Finland. There is direct access from the Tallinnanaukio to the Itis shopping center, and there is also one of the eastern entrances to the Itäkeskus metro station, from where the Helsinki Metro leaves the metro to the city's downtown center.

The Finnish name of the square refers to Tallinn, the capital of Estonia, while the Swedish name refers to Reval (Rääveli in Finnish), an older name previously used from Tallinn.

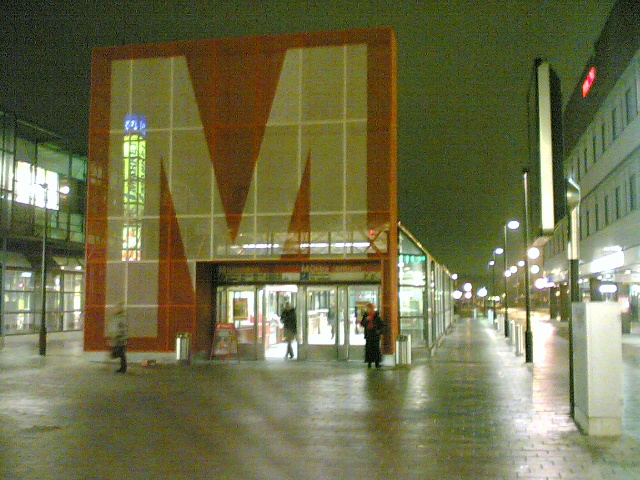
Itäkeskus metro station's eastern entrance to the westbound platform at Tallinnanaukio

== Services ==
Stoa, the East Helsinki Cultural Center, and the Itäkeskus bus station are also close to the square. Tallinnanaukio is also home to local pharmacy and health center. In addition, Tallinnanaukio has several restaurants and bars, and a market square in summer. Kimmo Schroderus' sculpture Kuru is also located in the square.

== Law enforcement at the square ==
In mid-July 2010, the Helsinki Police gave the guards of the shopping center permission to remove drunk, substance abuse and other disturbing behavior from Tallinnanaukio. The reasons for this are the large number of people passing through Tallinnanaukio and the position of the Itäkeskus metro station as an important public transport hub.
