= Tor Arne =

Finnish painter

Tor Arne (born 1934) is a Finnish painter. His paintings are often something between abstract and landscape art.

Tor Arne studied at the Free Art School of Helsinki in 1950's under such artists as Sam Vanni and Unto Pusa. Later Arne taught at the same school between 1962 and 1988 and worked as a rector from 1966 to 1988.
