= Juhani Pallasmaa =

Finnish architect

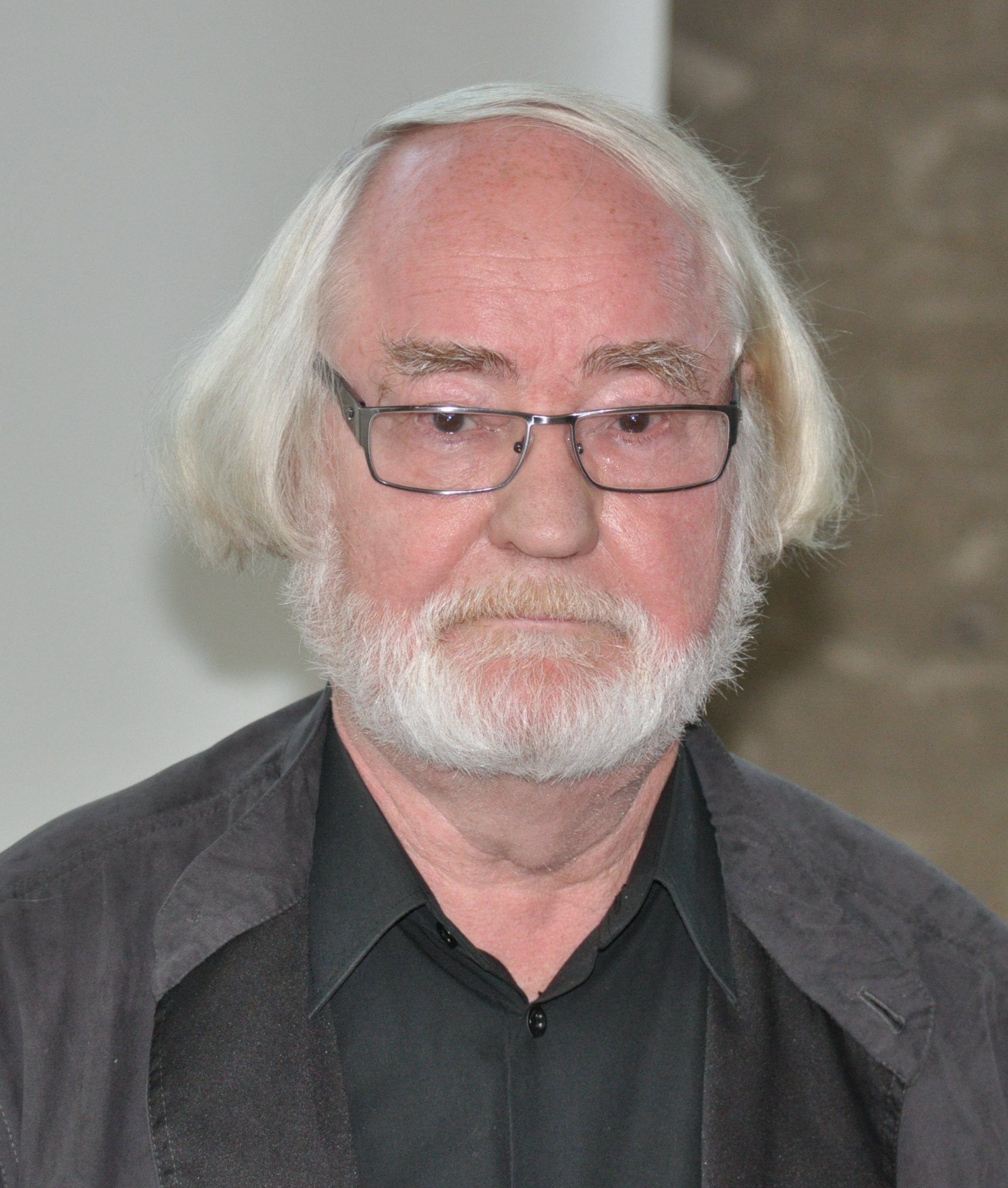
- Born: Juhani Uolevi Pallasmaa; 14 September 1936 (age 90); Hämeenlinna, Finland
- Occupation: Architect
- Practice: Arkkitehtitoimisto Juhani Pallasmaa KY
- Buildings: Art Museum, Rovaniemi; Institut Finlandais, Paris; Kamppi Centre, Helsinki; Moduli 225
- Projects: Tapiola development plan
- Design: Helsinki Telephone Association, phone booth

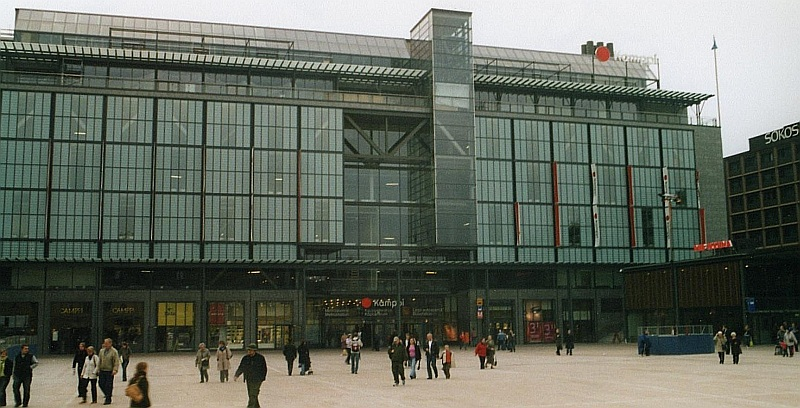
Kamppi Center, Helsinki, 2003–2006

Juhani Uolevi Pallasmaa (born 14 September 1936 in Hämeenlinna, Finland) is a Finnish architect and former professor of architecture and dean at the Helsinki University of Technology.

Among the many academic and civic positions Pallasmaa has held are those of Director of the Museum of Finnish Architecture 1978–1983, and head of the Institute of Industrial Arts, Helsinki. He established his own architect's office – Arkkitehtitoimisto Juhani Pallasmaa KY – in 1983 in Helsinki. From 2001 to 2003, he was Raymond E. Maritz Visiting Professor of Architecture in the Sam Fox School of Design & Visual Arts at Washington University in St. Louis, and in 2013 he received an honorary doctorate from that university. In 2010–2011, Pallasmaa served as Plym Distinguished Professor at the University of Illinois Urbana-Champaign, and in 2012–2013 he was scholar in residence at Frank Lloyd Wright's Taliesin. Pallasmaa has also lectured widely in Europe, North and South America, Africa and Asia.

His exhibitions of Finnish architecture, planning and visual arts have been displayed in more than thirty countries and he has written numerous articles on cultural philosophy, environmental psychology and theories of architecture and the arts. Many of his articles are first featured in ARK (The Finnish Architectural Review).

Among Pallasmaa's many books on architectural theory is The Eyes of the Skin – Architecture and the Senses, a book that has become a classic of architectural theory and is required reading on courses in many schools of architecture around the world.

A selection of essays written by Pallasmaa, from the early years to more recent ones, has been translated into English and collated together in the book Encounters – Architectural Essays (Helsinki, 2005), edited by Peter MacKeith. The book was shortlisted for the Royal Institute of British Architects 2005 International Book Award.

In 2006 Pallasmaa turned 70, and the occasion was marked by the publication of the book Archipelago. Essays on Architecture, edited by Peter MacKeith. The collection contains essays by 23 authors, all with some connection to Pallasmaa or MacKeith. They include: Karsten Harries, Daniel Hoffman, Steven Holl, Colin St John Wilson and Daniel Libeskind.

Pallasmaa is a member of the Finnish Association of Architects, and an honorary Fellow of the American Institute of Architects. During the spring of 2010, Pallasmaa, along with American playwright Leigh Fondakowski, was an Imagine Fund Distinguished Visiting Chair at the Institute for Advanced Study at University of Minnesota. Pallasmaa was jury member for the 2014 Pritzker Architecture Prize and The Daylight Award in 2020, 2022 and 2024.

== Architectural career ==
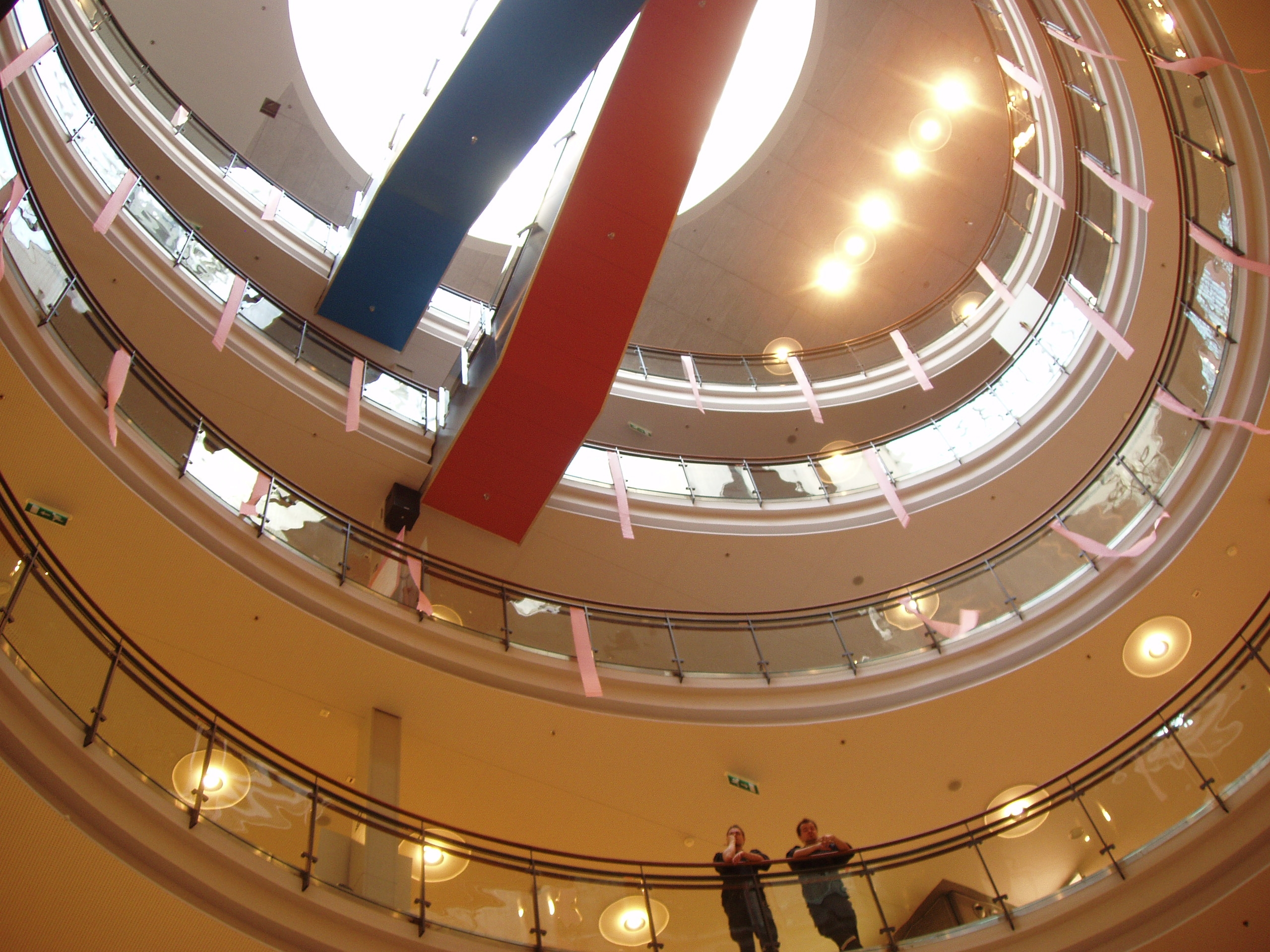
Kamppi Center, Helsinki, 2003–06

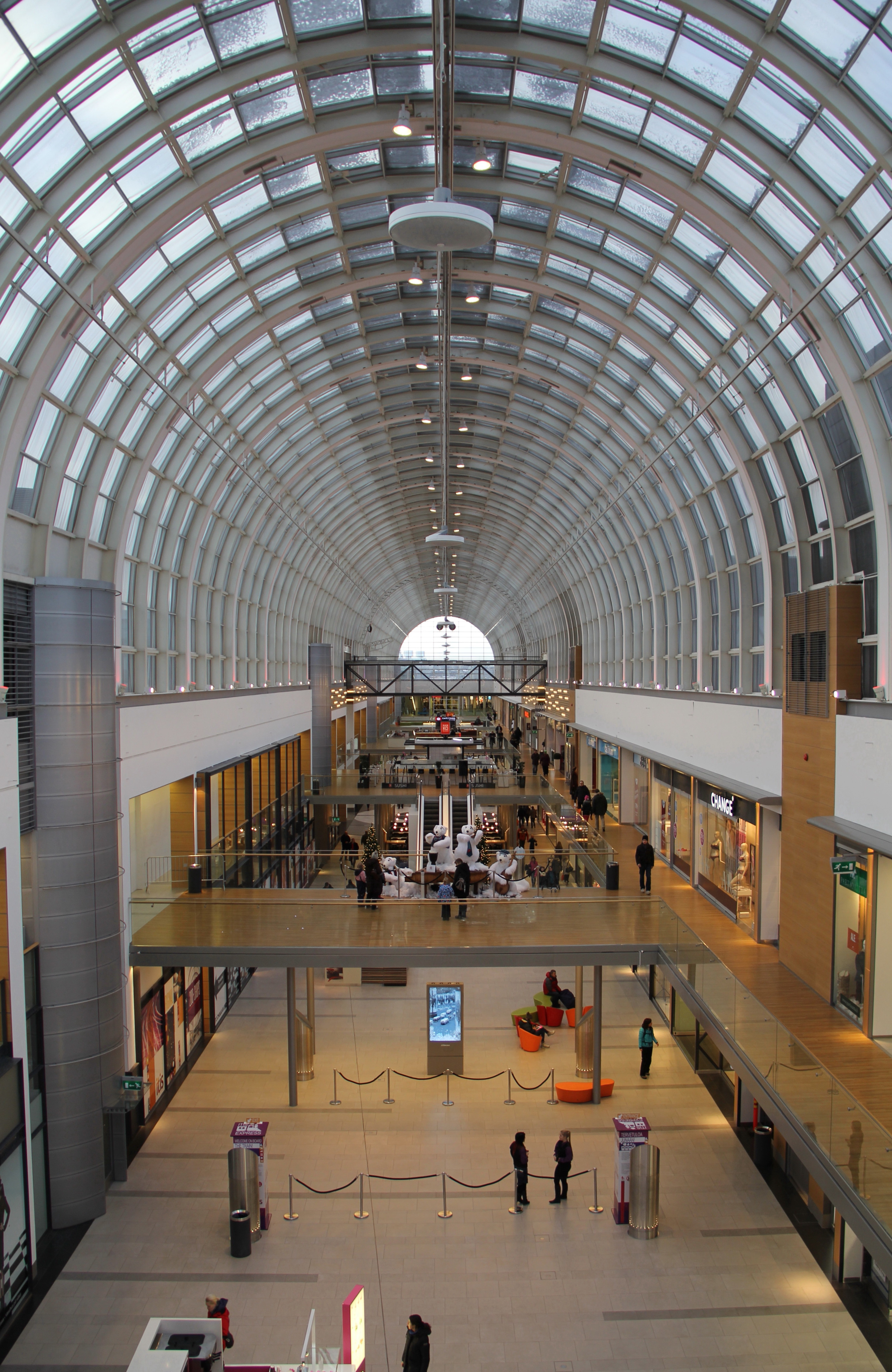
Itäkeskus Shopping Centre, Helsinki, 1989–91

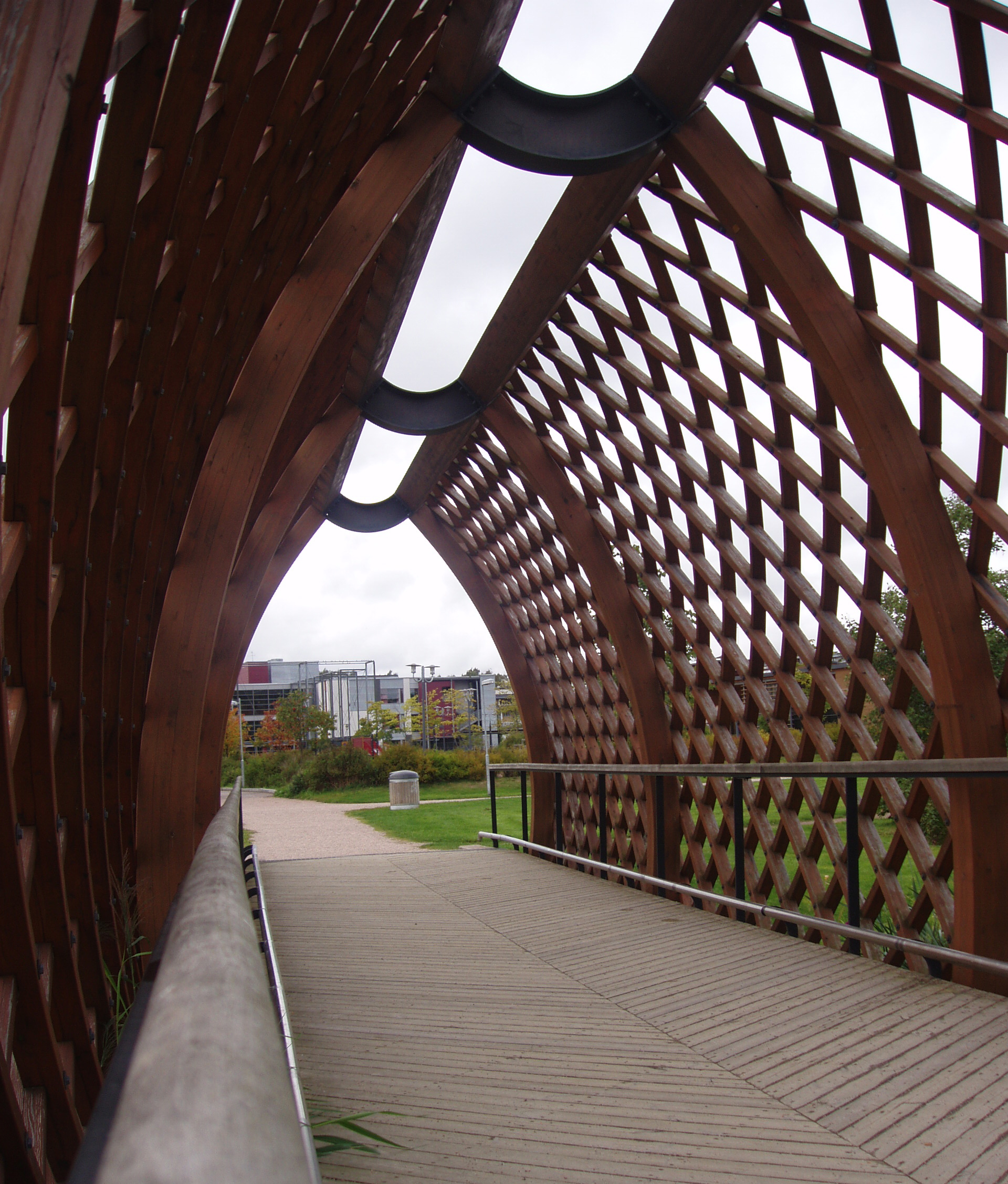
Viikki landscape bridge, Helsinki, 2002

Juhani Pallasmaa studied architecture at Helsinki University of Technology, qualifying as an architect in 1966. He taught architecture at Haile Selassie I University in Ethiopia in 1972–74. Pallasmaa was a partner in the architecture firm Juutilainen – Kairamo – Mikkola – Pallasmaa in 1966–1972, and in partnership with Kirmo Mikkola in the firm Mikkola – Pallasmaa in 1976–81. He established his own office in 1986.

In terms of architectural production, the work of Juhani Pallasmaa has undergone a shift during his career. His early career is characterised by concerns with rationalism, standardization and prefabrication. This was partly due to the influence of his mentor Aulis Blomstedt, who was very much concerned with proportional systems and standardization. Pallasmaa's first key work demonstrating these principles was the Moduli 225 (with Kristian Gullichsen), an industrial-produced summer house, 1969–1971, of which around six were built in Finland. However, the key models for this type of architecture were both Japanese architecture and the refined abstractions of Ludwig Mies van der Rohe. In Finland this type of architecture is referred to as "constructivism" – with only a family resemblance to the avant-gardist Russian Constructivism – and at that time, the late 1950s and 1960s, stood in opposition to the work of Alvar Aalto, who was increasingly seen in his home country as an idiosyncratic individualist. But the interest in Japan also contained the seeds for Pallasmaa's later concerns; materiality and a phenomenology of experience. It was after returning from teaching in Africa that Pallasmaa turned away from pure constructivism, and took up his concerns with psychology, culture, and phenomenology. His concern for details and small works such as exhibition design has sometimes earned him the label "jewel-box architect". 2006 saw the completion of his largest ever work, the Kamppi Center, incorporating the main bus station, a shopping centre and housing in central Helsinki, though the work was split up into different sections involving various architects, and overall design was under the control of architects Helin & Co.

== Architectural works (selection) ==
- Kamppi Center (under the direction of architects Helin & Co), Helsinki, 2003–2006.
- Snow Show, Lapland (with Rachel Whiteread), 2004.
- Bank of Finland Museum, Helsinki, 2002–2003.
- Pedestrian and cycle bridge, Viikki Eco-village, Helsinki, 2002.
- Cranbrook Academy of Art, Driveway Square, Bloomfield Hills, Michigan, 1994.
- Itäkeskus Shopping Centre, Helsinki; major extension, glass covered boulevard (interior, bridge and kiosk structures, street furniture, advertising systems) 1989–91.
- Ruoholahti Residential Area, Helsinki: design of outdoor spaces (canal, parks, bridges, materials, lighting, street furniture, etc.), 1990–91.
- Institut Finlandais (with Roland Schweitzer), 60, Rue des Ecoles, Paris, 1986–91.
- Helsinki Telephone Association, phone booth design, 1987.
- Helsinki Old Market Hall, Helsinki, renovation 1986.
- Art Museum, Rovaniemi, renovation, 1984–86.
- Summer atelier of artist Tor Arne, Vänö Island, 1970.
- Moduli 225 (with Kristian Gullichsen), model industrial summer house, 1969–1971.

== Exhibitions ==
- "Studies in Silence" exhibition of Pallasmaa's works at Valcucine Milano Brera, Milan, Italy, March 2014.
- "Eläinten arkkitehtuuri = Animal Architecture" exhibition curated by Juhani Pallasmaa held at the Museum of Finnish Architecture, Helsinki, 1995.

== Awards ==
- 2014 Schelling Architecture Theory Prize
- 1999 Jean Tschumi Prize for architectural criticism

== See also ==
- Architecture of Finland
- Phenomenology (architecture)

== Bibliography ==
- Kirmo Mikkola, Alvar Aalto in the Finnish Context, Edited by Juhani Pallasmaa. Routledge: London and New York, 2025.
- Juhani Pallasmaa, Rootedness: Reflections for Young Architects, Edited by Peter MacKeith. Wiley: Chichester, 2024.
- Juhani Pallasmaa and Robert McCarter, Understanding Architecture, Phaidon: London, 2012.
- Juhani Pallasmaa, Encounters 2 – Architectural Essays. Edited by Peter MacKeith. Rakennustieto: Helsinki, 2012.
- Juhani Pallasmaa, The Embodied Image. Wiley & Sons Publishers: Chichester, 2011.
- Juhani Pallasmaa, The Thinking Hand, John Wiley, 2009.
- Juhani Pallasmaa, Archipelago. Essays on Architecture. Edited by Peter MacKeith, Rakennustieto: Helsinki, 2006.
- Juhani Pallasmaa, Encounters. Architectural Essays. Edited by Peter MacKeith. Rakennustieto: Helsinki, 2005.
- Juhani Pallasmaa, The Architecture of Image: Existential Space in Cinema. Rakennustieto: Helsinki, 2001.
- Roger Connah, The Piglet Years. The Lost Militancy in Finnish Architecture. Datutop: Tampere, 2007.
- Ginés Garrido, in collaboration with Juhani Pallasmaa, Konstantin Melnikov [DVD]: La casa de Melnikov: la utopia de Moscu. Barcelona: Fundación Caja de Arquitectos, 2009.
- Juhani Pallasmaa, The Eyes of the Skin. Architecture and the Senses. Academy Editions: London, 1996.
