= Itäkeskus =

Coordinates: 60°12′40″N 25°04′55″E

Itäkeskus Östra centrum
- Helsinki Subdivision
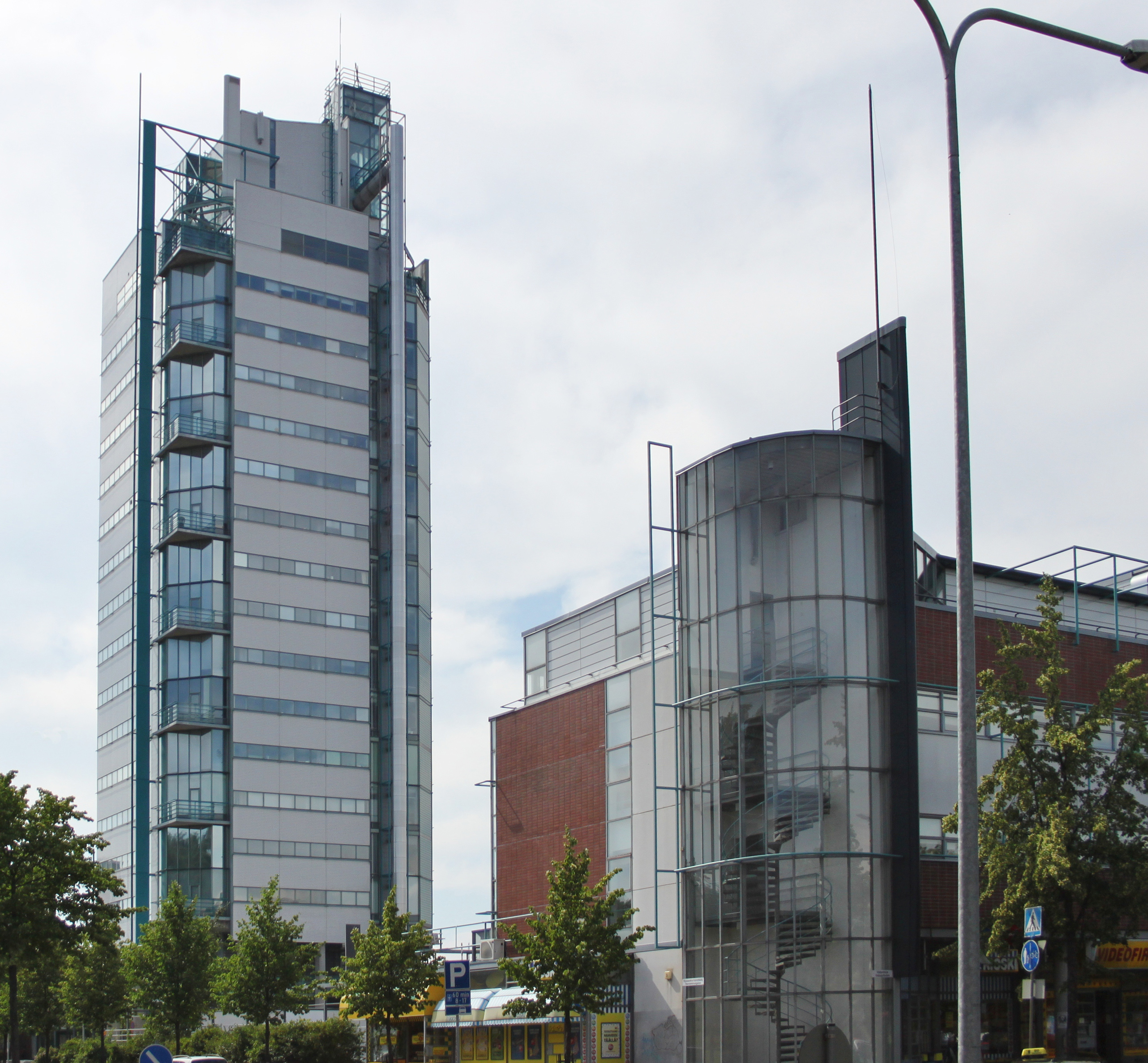
- Itäkeskuksen maamerkki (82 m) is the tallest building in Itäkeskus

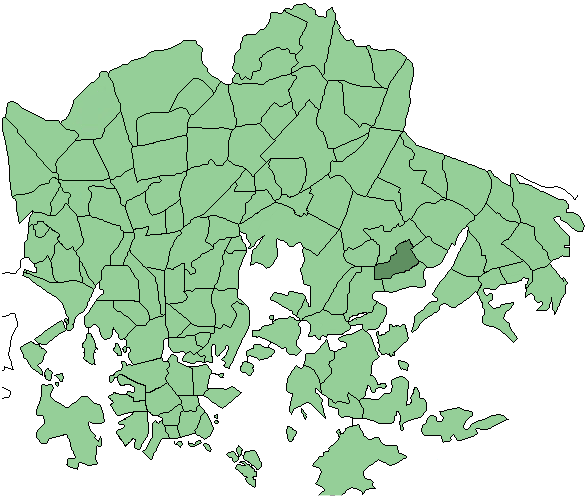
- Position of Itäkeskus within Helsinki
- Country: Finland
- Region: Uusimaa
- Sub-region: Greater Helsinki
- Municipality: Helsinki
- District: Eastern
- Subdivision regions: none
- Area: 1.17 km^{2} (0.45 sq mi)
- Population (2005): 4,833
  - Density: 4,131/km^{2} (10,700/sq mi)
- Postal codes: 00930
- Subdivision number: 457
- Neighbouring subdivisions: Puotinharju, Puotila, Marjaniemi, Roihuvuori

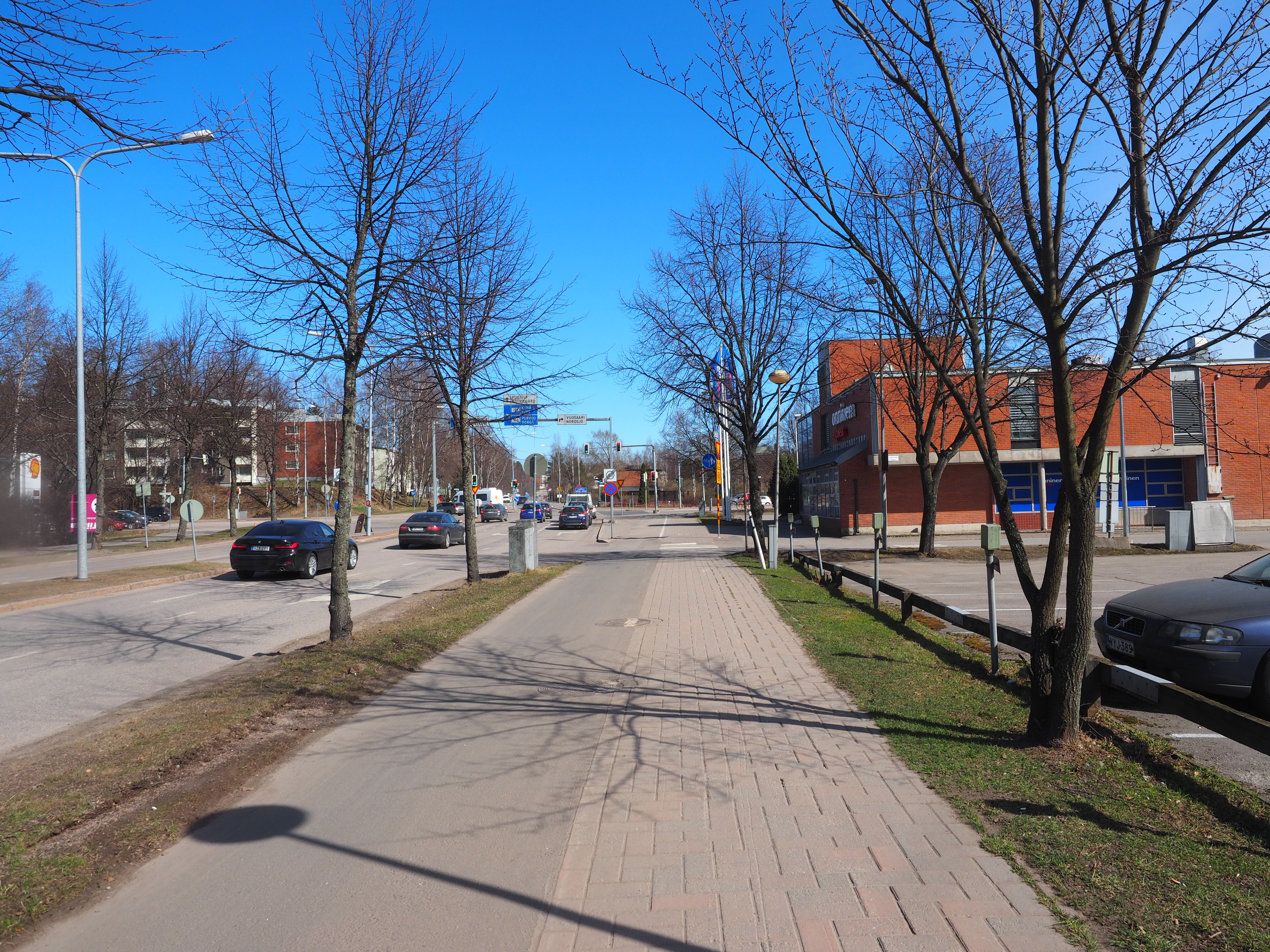
Kauppakartanontie street in Itäkeskus

Itäkeskus (Swedish: Östra centrum, literal translation East center) is a quarter in the neighbourhood of Vartiokylä (as of the 1980s) in Helsinki, Finland. The district's main attraction is the largest covered-in shopping mall in the Nordic countries, Itis, which make Itäkeskus as the most significant commercial center of East Helsinki. The district has a station on the Helsinki Metro (Itäkeskus metro station), whose eastern entrance at the Tallinnanaukio square leads to the shopping centre. Itäkeskus has the eastern terminus of bus lines 500 and 550; the western terminus of line 500 is Munkkivuori and line 550 is Espoo's Westend bus station. Construction of the Jokeri light rail, which replaces bus line 550, began in 2019 and service began in 2023. The most important road connection to the Helsinki central from Itäkeskus runs along Itäväylä.

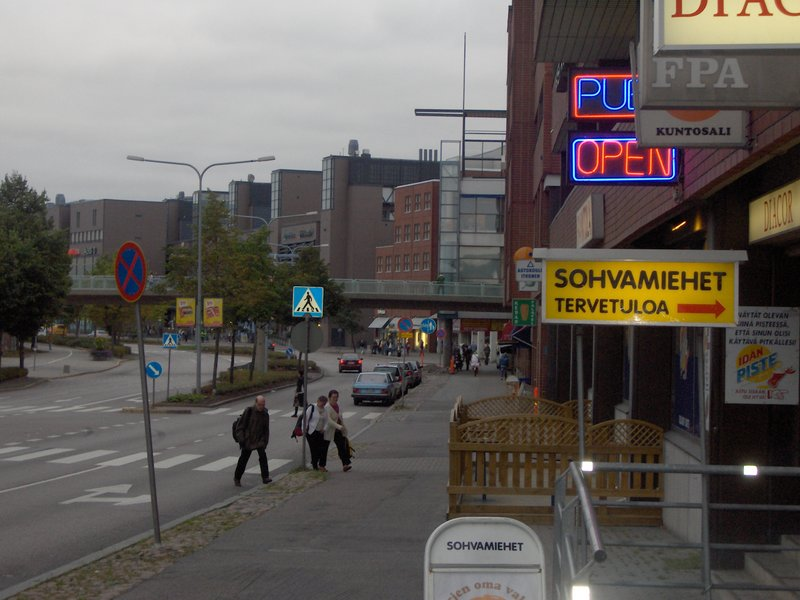
Itis shopping centre along Turunlinnantie

At the end of 2018, 38.1 per cent of Itäkeskus' residents had a foreign background. About 12 percent of the residents had an African background, which was the largest share of all areas in Helsinki. At the end of 2025, the share of foreign language speakers is 50,0 per cent in Itäkeskus.

== History ==
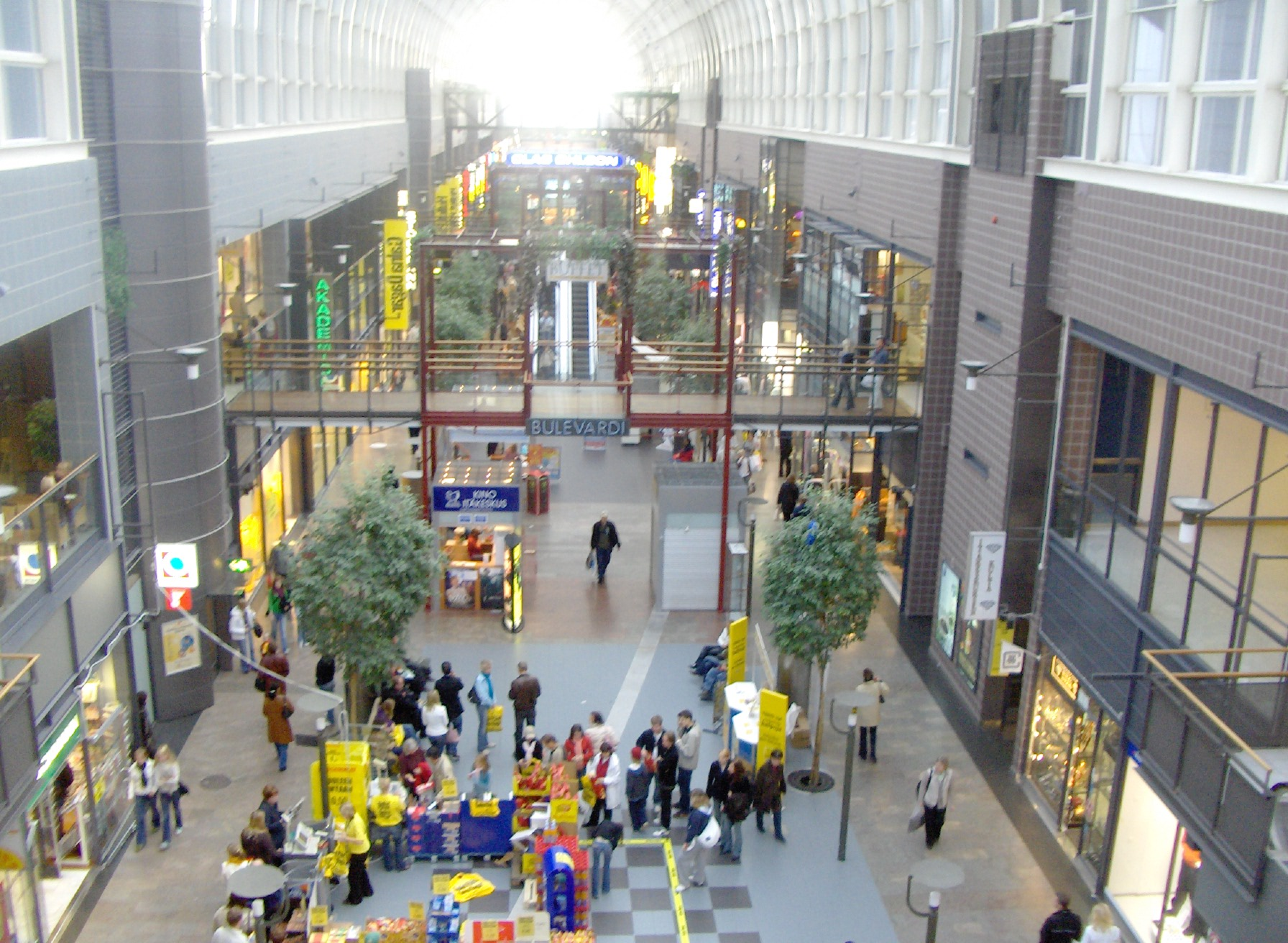
Hullut päivät campaign in the Itäkeskus shopping mall.

Itäkeskus has been built since the 1970s. The old K-Citymarket, which operated there, opened its doors on March 31, 1977, and its 67,246 m³ hall could accommodate a 6,500 m^{2} store. The Itäkeskus swimming hall was built in 1993.

Maamerkki, a high-rise building located on the Kauppakartanonkatu street near the Lyypekinaukio square in Itäkeskus, was completed in 1987.

On the other side of the Itäväylä, opposite Itis, is another shopping center called Easton Helsinki, which was completed in October 2017.

== See also ==
- Helsinki Metro
- Herttoniemi
- Geography of Helsinki
- Malmi, Helsinki
- Ring I
