= Itäväylä =

Road in Finland

Regional road's sign number

Itäväylä (the Eastern Highway, Swedish: Österleden) is a motorway-like road in the Greater Helsinki area of Finland, mainly in the Helsinki conurbation. It is part of the Finnish regional road 170 (Finnish: Seututie 170, Swedish: Regionalväg 170). The road begins in Kalasatama, Sörnäinen in eastern Helsinki and continues east through Kulosaari and then across to Herttoniemi. Itäväylä continues all the way through East Helsinki (including Itäkeskus in Vartiokylä), finally crossing the eastern end of Ring III. After that, the road continues towards east to Virolahti via Sipoo, Porvoo, Loviisa, Kotka and Hamina as Regional Road 170 (Mt 170).

Itäväylä is perhaps the most important connection between central Helsinki and East Helsinki with the Helsinki Metro, because almost all bus and private car traffic between them passes along Itäväylä.

A similar road, Länsiväylä (Western Highway, Swedish: Västerleden), begins in Ruoholahti and continues westwards towards Kirkkonummi.

== Images ==
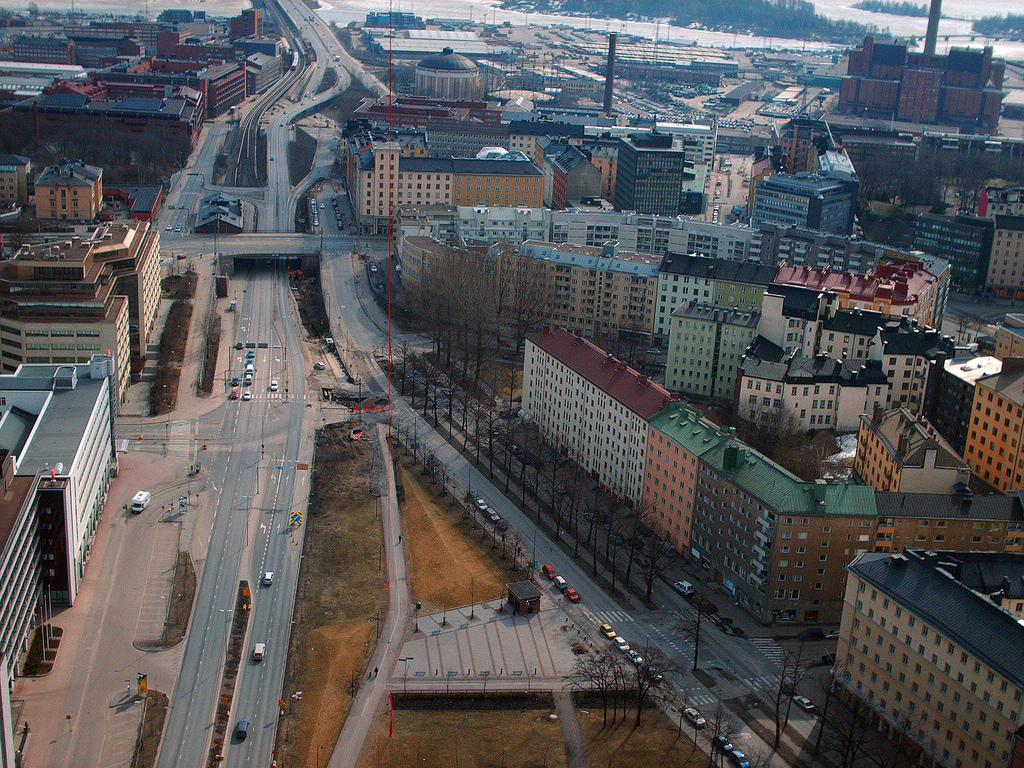
Itäväylä in Sörnäinen, Helsinki from air

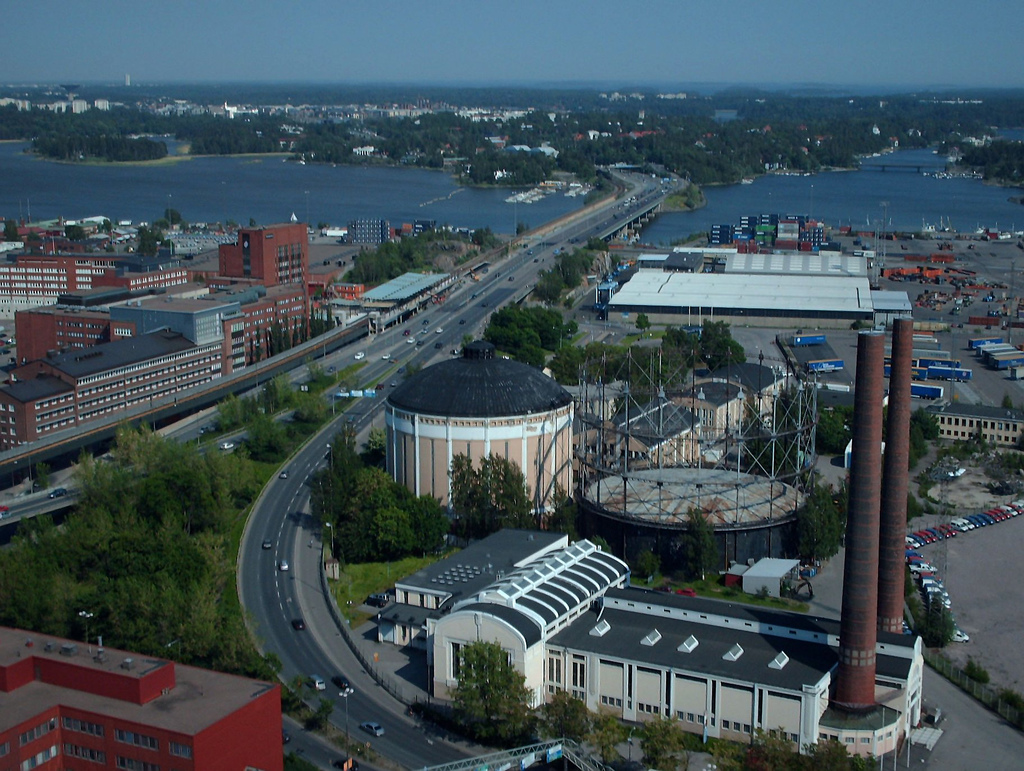
Suvilahti former power plant in Helsinki

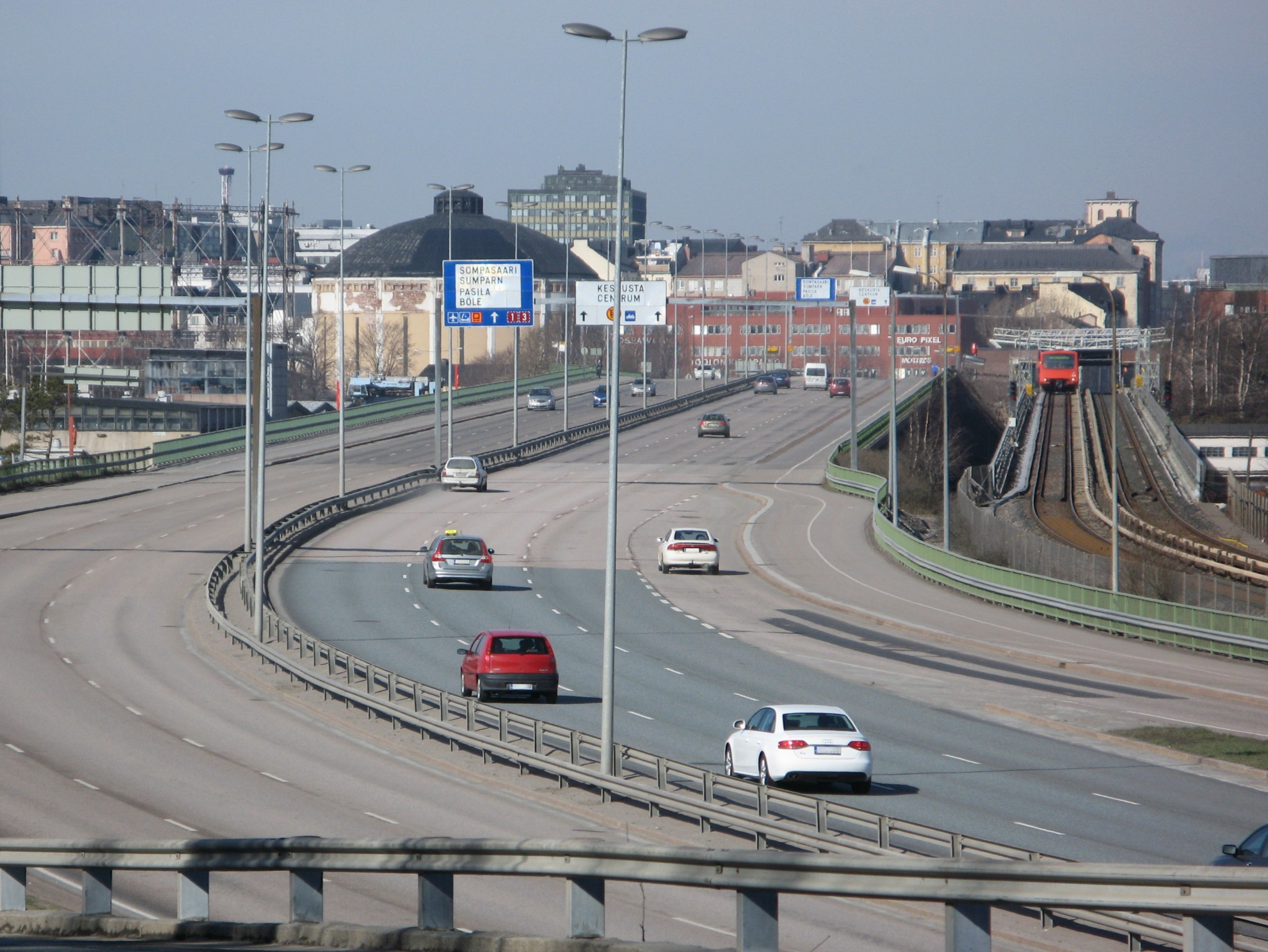
Bridge of Kulosaari in Helsinki

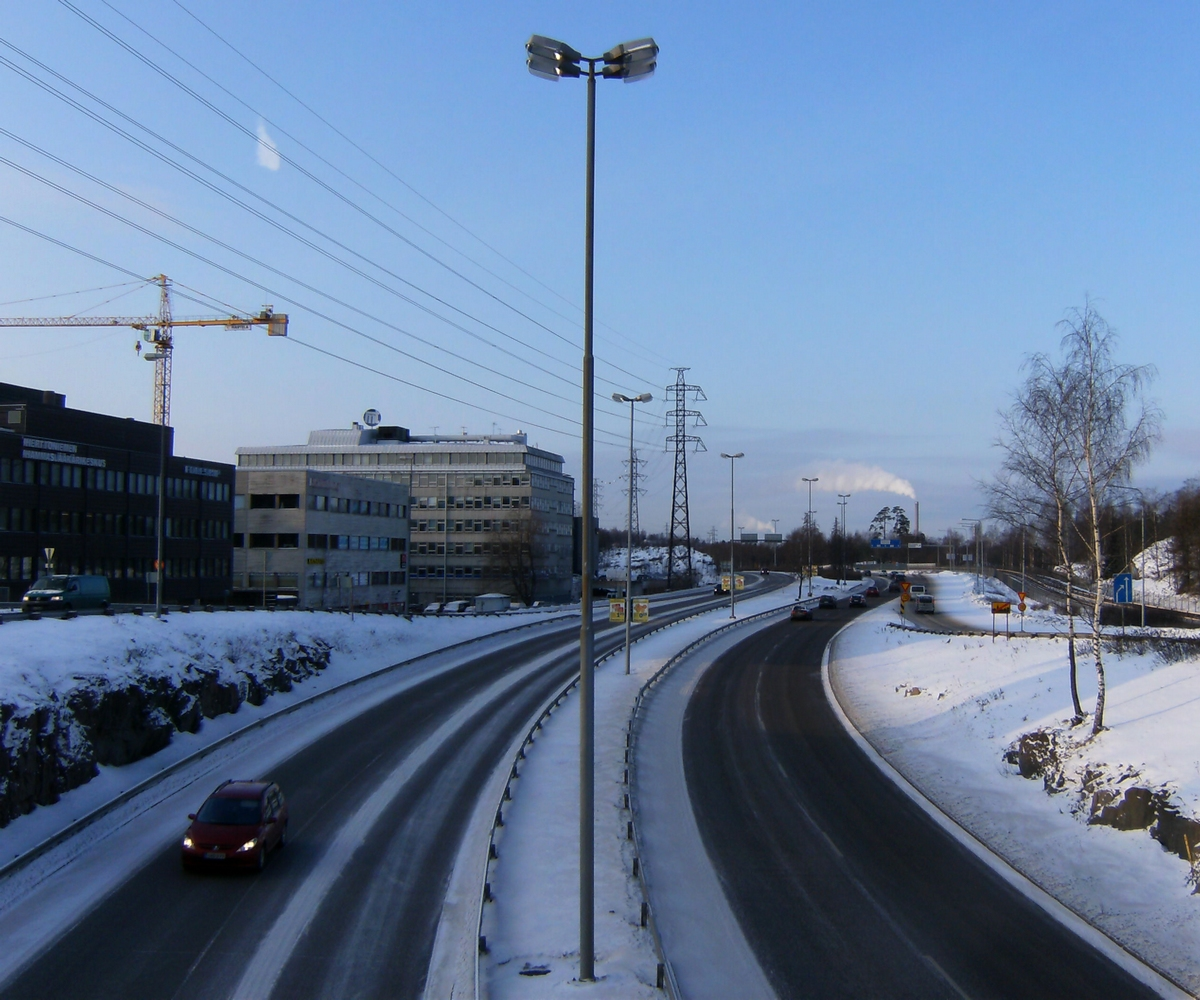
Itäväylä in Herttoniemi, Helsinki

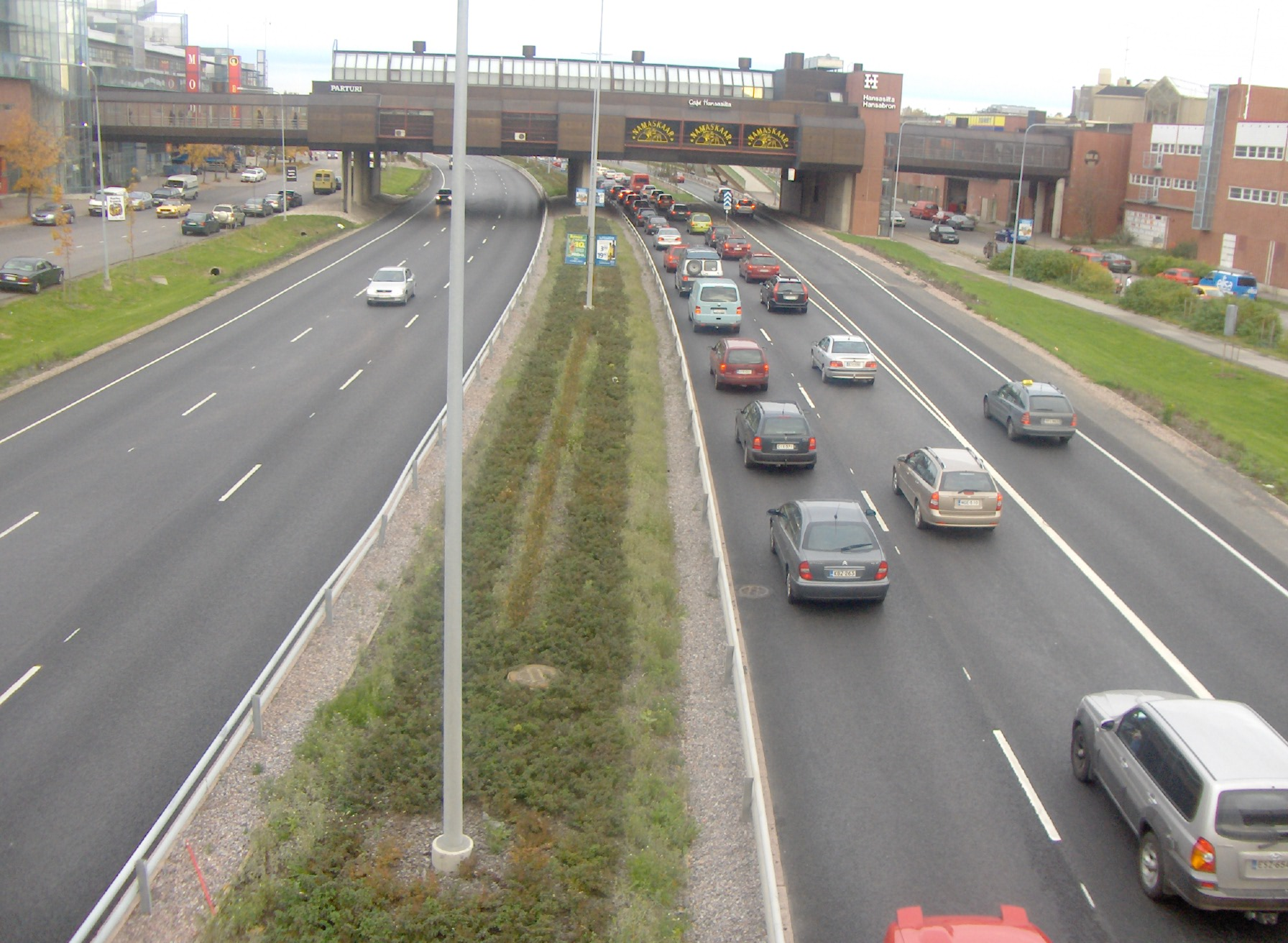
Itäväylä in Itäkeskus, Helsinki

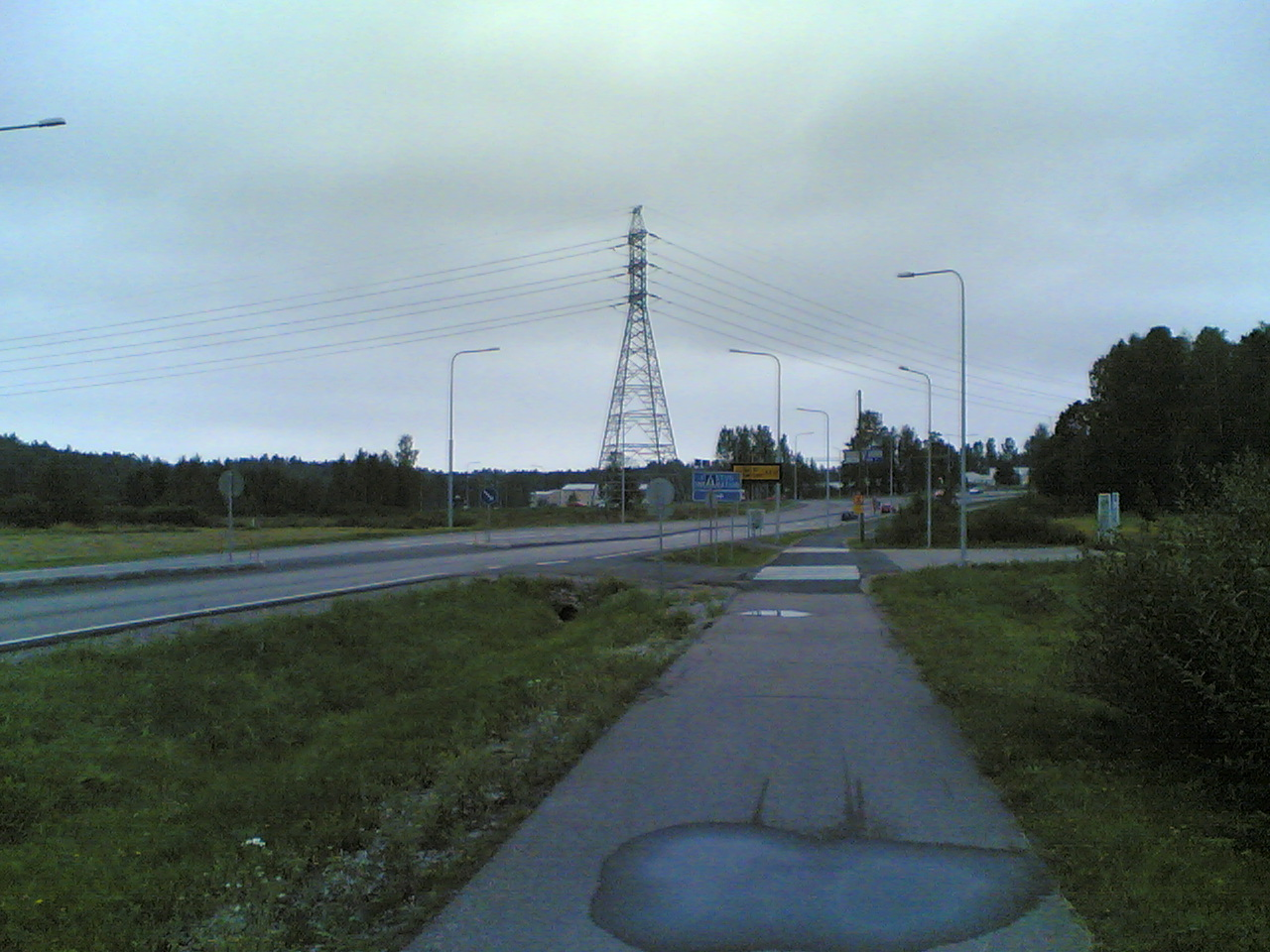
Itäväylä in Mellunmäki, Helsinki

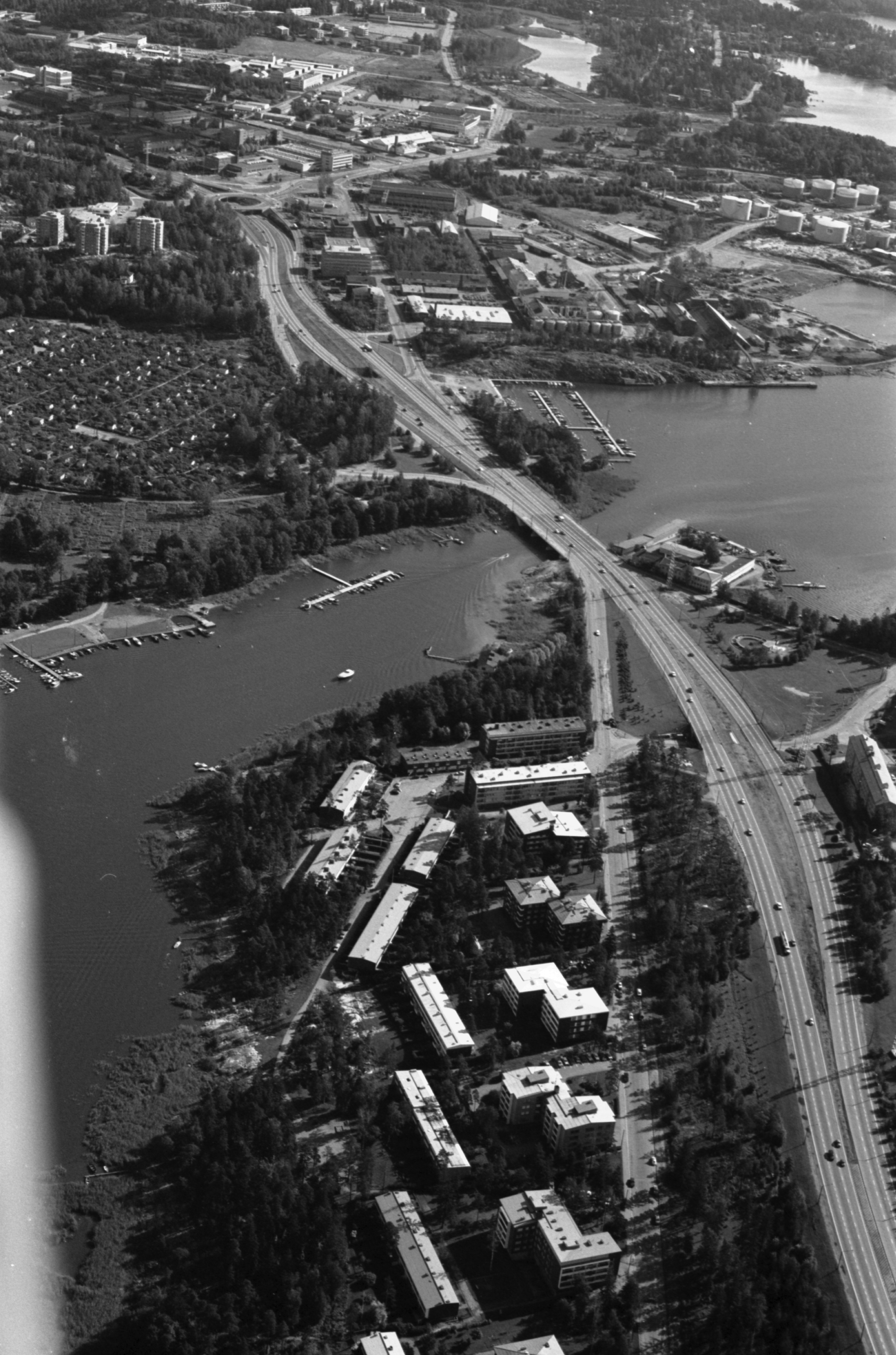
Itäväylä in the 1970s

== Other uses ==
- Itäväylä is the name of a Finnish language free newspaper distributed in Porvoo, Sipoo, Loviisa, Askola, Pornainen, Lapinjärvi, Myrskylä and Pukkila.
- Itäväylä is a shopping center in the town of Hamina.
