= SPL Helsingin piiri =

District organisation of the Football Association of Finland

Suomen Palloliiton Helsingin piiri
- Abbreviation: SPL Helsinki
- Purpose: District Football Association
- Location(s): Maistraatinkatu 5 00240 Helsinki Finland
- CEO: Kimmo J. Lipponen
- Website: helsinki.palloliitto.fii

The SPL Helsingin piiri (Helsinki Football Association) was one of the 12 district organisations of the Football Association of Finland. It administered lower tier football in Helsinki.

== Background ==
Suomen Palloliitto Helsingin piiri, commonly referred to as SPL Helsingin piiri or SPL Helsinki, is the governing body for football in Helsinki. Based in Helsinki, the Association's General Secretary is Kimmo J. Lipponen.

The association was founded on 9 January 1924 and is the oldest District Football Association in Finland. SPL Vaasa was established 6 days later and SPL Turku on 5 May 1924. Since 1970, the organisation has only covered the city of Helsinki when the 13 surrounding municipalities formed the new SPL Keski-Uusimaa (which was later to become part of SPL Uusimaa). On 31 December 2009, SPL Helsinki had 137 member clubs and 14,034 registered players. The District's mission statement seeks to enable all to enjoy soccer at their respective ability levels and in a variety of roles. The District supports its members needs and demand for football on both a competitive and recreational basis as well as providing supporting services for its membership.

== Member clubs ==
=== Existing clubs ===
Abbreviation	Settlement	Official Name	Division	Cup	Other information
AC Balls	Helsinki	AC Balls	Seiska	*	
AC StaSi	Helsinki	AC Stadin Sissit	Vitonen	* *	
AC StaSi/Europort	Helsinki	AC Stadin Sissit / Europort	Kutonen	*	
AFC EMU	Kurkimäki	Athletic Football Club EMU	Vitonen	* *	
Arsenal	Helsinki	Arsenal	Vitonen	*	Tier 2 (3 seasons): 1945, 1946/47, 1949
Arsenal/2	Helsinki	Arsenal / 2	Seiska	*	
Atlantis FC	Helsinki	Atlantis FC Edustus	Kakkonen	* * *	Recent history: Atlantis Helsinki 1: see Allianssi Vantaa; Atlantis Helsinki 2 Tier 2 (5 seasons): 2005–09; Tier 3 (5 seasons): 2002–04, 2010–
Atlantis FC/SOB	Helsinki	Atlantis FC / SOB	Seiska	*	
Canona	Helsinki	Cantona	Seiska	*	
Cantona	Helsinki	Cantona	Seiska	*	
Club Latino Espanol	Helsinki	Club Latino Espanol	Seiska	* *	
Colo-Colo/DOS	Helsinki	Club Colo-Colo / DOS	Seiska	* *	
Colo-Colo/UNO	Töölö	Colo-Colo / UNO	Vitonen	* *	
Cosmos	Helsinki	Cosmos	Kutonen	*	
Dal	Helsinki	Football Club Dal	Kutonen	*	
Dicken	Lauttasaari	Drumsö Idrottskamrater Dicken	Seiska	*	
Dynamo	Helsinki	Dynamo	Seiska	*	
EHP	Etelä-Haaga	EHP (Etelä-Haagan Pallo)	Kutonen	*	
Ellas	Helsinki	FC Ellas Helsinki	Vitonen	* *	
Ellas/FC Aztecas	Helsinki	FC Ellas / Club de Futbol Aztecas	Seiska	*	
FC ALPC	Helsinki	FC A la Plancha Calamar	Kutonen	* *	
FC Bombers	Helsinki	FC Bombers	Kutonen	*	
FC Botan	Oulunkylä	FC Botan	Vitonen	*	
FC BrBr	Helsinki	FC Brunnsparkens Bröder	Kutonen	* *	
FC Degis	Laajasalo	FC Degis	Nelonen	* *	
FC East	Myllypuro	FC East United	Kutonen	*	
FC Elite	Helsinki	FC Elite	Seiska	*	
FC FC	Helsinki	FC FC	Kutonen	*	
FC HEIV	Helsinki	FC Helsingfors Idrottsvänner	Kutonen	* *	
FC Hieho	Helsinki	FC Hieho	Seiska	* *	
FC Härät	Helsinki	FC Härät	Kutonen	*	
FC IKHTYS	Kurkimäki	FC IKHTYS	Kutonen	* *	
FC KaKe	Siltamäki	FC Kanuunoiden Kerma	Kutonen	*	
FC Kontu	Helsinki	FC Kontu Itä-Helsinki	Kolmonen	* *	Formerly known as Kontulan Urheilijat; Tier 2 (10 seasons): 1986–91, 1993–96; Tier 3 (12 seasons): 1984–85, 1992, 1997, 1999–2000, 2003–08
FC Kontu/2	Kontula, Mellunkylä	FC Kontu Itä-Helsinki / 2	Nelonen	* *	
FC Kontu/3	Kontula, Mellunkylä	FC Kontu Itä-Helsinki /3	Seiska	*	
FC Kontu/4	Kontula, Mellunkylä	FC Kontu Itä-Helsinki / 4	Kutonen	*	
FC Kontu/HSP	Kontula, Mellunkylä	FC Kontu Itä-Helsinki / HSP	Seiska	*	
FC Kuitu/1	Vuosaari	FC Kuitu / 2	Vitonen	*	
FC Kuitu/2	Vuosaari	FC Kuitu / 2	Vitonen	*	
FC Pakila	Helsinki	FC Pakila	Seiska	* *	
FC Pihlajisto/LEPRE	Pihlajisto	FC Pihlajisto / LEPRE	Nelonen	*	
FC Playmates	Helsinki	FC Playmates	Seiska	* *	
FC POHU	Helsinki	FC Pohjois-Haagan Urheilijat	Kolmonen	* *	Tier 3 (1 season): 1977
FC POHU/2	Pohjois-Haaga	FC Pohjois-Haagan Urheilijat / 2	Vitonen	* *	
FC POHU/LostKurd	Pohjois-Haaga	FC Pohjois-Haagan Urheilijat / LostKurd	Seiska	*	
FC POHU/Playboys	Pohjois-Haaga	FC Pohjois-Haagan Urheilijat / Playboys	Vitonen	*	
FC POHU/Shrimps	Pohjois-Haaga	FC Pohjois-Haagan Urheilijat / Shrimps	Kutonen	*	
FC POHU/Simpsons	Pohjois-Haaga	FC Pohjois-Haagan Urheilijat / Simpsons	Vitonen	*	
FC POHU/Susijengi	Pohjois-Haaga	FC Pohjois-Haagan Urheilijat / Susijengi	Kutonen	*	
FC POHU/Swigu	Pohjois-Haaga	FC Pohjois-Haagan Urheilijat / Swigu	Vitonen	*	
FC Puimur	Helsinki	FC Puimur	Kutonen	*	
FC Puotila	Puotila	FC Puotila	Nelonen	*	
FC Puotila/Reservit	Puotila	FC Puotila / Reservit	Seiska	*	
FC Sonnit	Helsinki	FC Sonnit	Seiska	*	
FC Spede	Helsinki	FC Spede	Seiska	* *	
FC Viikingit	Helsinki	FC Viikingit	Ykkönen	* * *	Formerly known as Vuosaaren Viikingit; Tier 1 (1 season): 2007; Tier 2 (9 seasons): 2002–06, 2008– Tier 3 (2 seasons): 1996, 2001
FC Viikingit Ed 2	Vuosaari	FC Viikingit Edustus / 2	Kolmonen	* *	
FC Viikingit/05	Vuosaari, East Helsinki	FC Viikingit / 05	Kutonen	*	
FC Wartti/WB	Helsinki	FC Wartti / WB	Seiska	*	
FFR	Helsinki	FFR (Fotbollsföreningen Rugbyplanspojkarna)	Vitonen	*	
FFR/Väiski	Helsinki	FFR (Fotbollsföreningen Rugbyplanspojkarna) / Väiski	Kutonen	*	
Geishan Pallo	Helsinki	Geishan Pallo	Vitonen	*	
Geishan Pallo/Pallo	Helsinki	Geishan Pallo / Pallo	Kutonen	*	
Gnistan	Helsinki	Idrottsföreningen Gnistan	Kakkonen	* * *	Tier 2 (6 seasons): 1995–98, 2001–02; Tier 3 (13 seasons): 1990, 1994, 1999–2000, 2003–
Gnistan/2	Oulunkylä	Idrottsföreningen Gnistan / 2	Nelonen	* *	
Gnistan/Ogeli	Oulunkylä	Idrottsföreningen Gnistan / Ogeli	Nelonen	* *	
Gnistan/Roots	Oulunkylä	Idrottsföreningen Gnistan / Roots	Kutonen	*	
Grumset	Helsinki	Grumset	Kutonen	*	
HakPa	Hakaniemi	Hakaniemen Palloilijat	Kutonen	*	
HDS / Mondial	Kumpula	Helsinki Diplomat Sports Club / Mondial	Kolmonen	* *	
HDS/Club Latino Español	Kumpula	Helsinki Diplomat Sports Club / Club Latino Español	Kutonen	*	
HDS/Express	Kumpula	Helsinki Diplomat Sports Club / Express	Kutonen	*	
HDS/Magnifiga	Kumpula	Helsinki Diplomat Sports Club / Magnifiga	Seiska	*	
HeKuLa	Hakaniemi	Helsingin Kukkaislapset	Vitonen	* *	
HeMan	Helsinki	Hesperian Mankeli	Kutonen	* *	
HePu	Helsinki	FC Helsingin Pumppu	Kutonen	* *	
HePu/FCFC	Helsinki	Helsingin Pumppu/ FCFC	Seiska	*	
HePuLi	Helsinki	Helsingin Punalippu	Vitonen	*	
Herrasmiehet	Helsinki	Jalkapalloseura Herrasmiehet	Nelonen	*	
HerTo	Herttoniemi	Herttoniemen Toverit	Kolmonen	* *	
HerTo/2	Herttoniemi	Herttoniemen Toverit / 2	Kutonen	*	
HIFK	Helsinki	HIFK Fotboll	Ykkönen	* * *	Full name – Idrottsföreningen Kamraterna i Helsingfors; Tier 1 (29 seasons): 1930–45, 1946/47-49, 1958–66, 1970–72; Tier 2 (19 seasons): 1945/46, 1950–57, 1967–69, 1973–74, 1999–2002, 2011; Tier 3 (18 seasons): 1975–78, 1988–98, 2008–10
HIFK/2	Helsinki	HIFK Fotboll / 2	Nelonen	* *	
HIFK/3	Helsinki	HIFK Fotboll / 3	Kutonen	* *	
HJK	Helsinki	Helsingin Jalkapalloklubi	Veikkausliiga	* * *	Tier 1 (73 seasons): 1931, 1933–45, 1946/47-49, 1953–62, 1964– Tier 2 (5 seasons): 1945/46, 1950–52, 1963
HJK-j/Kmäki	Kannelmäki	Helsingin Jalkapalloklubi Juniorit / Kannelmäki	Vitonen	* *	
HJK-j/Lsalo	Laajasalo	Helsingin Jalkapalloklubi Juniorit / Laajasalo	Vitonen	* *	
HJK-j/Töölö	Töölö	Helsingin Jalkapalloklubi Juniorit / Töölö	Seiska	* *	
HöySä	Pitäjänmäki	Höyläämötien Sähly	Seiska	*	
HPS	Helsinki	Helsingin Palloseura	Kolmonen	* * *	Tier 1 (26 seasons): 1930-40/41, 1945–49, 1956–64; Tier 2 (18 seasons): 1943/44, 1950–55, 1965–70, 1972, 1974–76, 1983; Tier 3 (12 seasons): 1973, 1977–82, 1984, 1988–89, 1997–98
HPS/2	Helsinki	Helsingin Palloseura / 2	Nelonen	*	
HPS/Jägers	Helsinki	Helsingin Palloseura / Jägers	Seiska	*	
HuPaVeikot	Helsinki	HuPaVeikot	Seiska	*	
JJ Vepo	Jakomäki	JJ Velttopotku	Seiska	*	
JP13	Helsinki	JP13	Kutonen	*	
Juhlahevoset	Helsinki	FC Juhlahevoset	Kutonen	* *	
Kiffen	Helsinki	FC Kiffen 08	Kakkonen	* * *	History: Formerly known as Kronohagens Idrottsförening (abbrev. KIF): KIF Helsinki until 1976; Kiffen Helsinki since 1977; Tier 1 (25 seasons): : 1930–32, 1940/41-46/47, 1948–57, 1960–64, 1977–78; Tier 2 (16 seasons): 1936–39, 1947/48, 1958–59, 1965, 1969–74, 1976, 1979; Tier 3 (22 seasons): 1975, 1980–85, 1990, 1994–2004, 2009–
Kiffen/2	Kruununhaka	FC Kiffen / 2	Nelonen	*	
Klubi-04	Helsinki	Klubi-04	Ykkönen	* * *	
KPPK	Helsinki	Kirkonpellon Pallokerho	Kutonen	*	
KPR	Karhupuisto, Kallio	Karhupuiston Vartijat FC	Kutonen	* *	
Kullervo	Kallio	Helsingin Kullervo	Kutonen	*	
KuRa	Helsinki	KuRa	Kutonen	*	
Kurvin Vauhti	Alppiharju	Kurvin Vauhti	Vitonen	* *	
KäPa	Käpylä	Käpylän Pallo	Kolmonen	* * *	
KäPa/PuLe	Käpylä	Käpylän Pallo / Putoava Lehti	Nelonen	*	
LauttaPallo	Lauttasaari	Lauttasaaren Pallo	Kutonen	* *	
LeJa	Helsinki	Levottomat Jalat	Kutonen	*	
LPS	Laajasalo	Laajasalon Palloseura	Kakkonen	* * *	
LPS/2	Laajasalo	Laajasalon Palloseura / 2	Kutonen	*	
LPS/Kuninkaat	Laajasalo	Laajasalon Palloseura / Kuninkaat	Nelonen	*	
MaKu/Baltika	Helsinki	Marmiksen Kuula / Baltika	Nelonen	* *	
MaKu/Legends	Pihlajamäki	Marmiksen Kuula / Legends	Vitonen	*	
MaKu/Nelonen	Pihlajamäki	Marmiksen Kuula / Nelonen	Vitonen	*	
MoPo	Helsinki	Jalkapalloseura Mooseksen Potku	Seiska	*	
MPS	Malmi	Malmin Palloseura	Kolmonen	* *	
MPS/2	Malmi	Malmin Palloseura / 2	Vitonen	* *	
MPS/4	Malmi	Malmin Palloseura / 4	Kutonen	*	
MPS/Atletico Akatemia	Malmi	Malmin Palloseura / Atletico Akatemia	Seiska	*	
MPS / Atletico Malmi	Malmi	Malmin Palloseura / Atletico Malmi	Kolmonen	* *	
MPS/Old Stars	Malmi	Malmin Palloseura / Old Stars	Nelonen	*	
Ompun Pomppu	Helsinki	Ompun Pomppu	Kutonen	*	
Orson	Helsinki	Orson	Seiska	*	
PeTe	Helsinki	PeTe	Seiska	*	
PETO	Malminkartano	Malminkartanon PETO (Peli-Toverit)	Kutonen	*	
PH-99	Helsinki	Pallo Hukassa-99	Vitonen	* *	
PK-35	Helsinki	Pallokerho-35 ry	Kolmonen	* *	Previously known as PK-35/2.
Ponnistajat	Malmi	Malmin Ponnistajat	Kutonen	* *	
Ponnistus	Helsinki	Helsingin Ponnistus	Kolmonen	* *	Tier 1 (4 seasons): 1948, 1968, 1973, 1995; Tier 2 (28 seasons): 1949–55, 1958–63, 1965–67, 1969–72, 1974–77, 1993–94, 1996–97; Tier 3 (21 seasons): 1978–83, 1985–92, 1998–2002, 2005–06
Ponnistus/2	Helsinki	Helsingin Ponnistus / 2	Vitonen	*	
PPJ	Lauttasaari, Eira	Pallo-Pojat Juniorit	Nelonen	* *	
PPJ/Akatemia	Lauttasaari, Eira	Pallopojat Juniorit / Akatemia	Vitonen	* *	
PPV	Pajamäki	Pajamäen Pallo-Veikot	Kolmonen	* *	
PPV/2	Pajamäki	Pajamäen Pallo-Veikot / 2	Vitonen	* *	
PPV/Seos	Pajamäki	Pajamäen Pallo-Veikot / Seos	Vitonen	*	
PuiU	Helsinki	Puistolan Urheilijat	Kolmonen	*	
RoU	Roihuvuori	Roihuvuoren Urheilijat	Vitonen	*	
RoU/Naamiomiehet	Siltamäki	Roihuvuoren Urheilijat / FC Naamiomiehet	Seiska	*	
Ruila	Helsinki	Ruila	Seiska	*	
Ruisku	Roihuvuori	Roihuvuoren Ruisku	Kutonen	*	
Ruisku/09	Roihuvuori	Roihuvuoren Ruisku / 09	Kutonen	*	
SAPA	Helsinki	SAPA (Savannan Pallo)	Kolmonen	* *	
SAPA/2	Helsinki	SAPA (Savannan Pallo) / 2	Vitonen	* *	
SAPA/3	Helsinki	SAPA (Savannan Pallo) / 3	Seiska	* *	
SAYKUS	Helsinki	SAYKUS (Suomi-Arabia Ystävyys, Kulttuuri ja Urheilu Seura)	Vitonen	*	
Sheikit	Helsinki	Arabian Sheikit	Kutonen	*	
Spartak	Helsinki	Spartak	Kolmonen	*	
SS Stanley	Oulunkylä	SS Stanley	Vitonen	*	
Stallions	Kallio	Kallion Stallions	Kutonen	*	
Strikers/Bertil	Helsinki	Strikers / Bertil	Vitonen	*	
SUMU	Suurmetsä	Suurmetsän Urheilijat	Nelonen	* *	
SUMU/77	Suurmetsä	Suurmetsän Urheilijat / 77	Kutonen	*	
Tavastia	Helsinki	FC Tavastia	Nelonen	*	
Tavastia/FC Mojo	Helsinki	FC Tavastia / FC Mojo	Kutonen	*	
ToTe/AP	Toukola	Toukolan Teräs / Avauspotku	Vitonen	* *	
Trikiinit	Helsinki	Trikiinit	Kutonen	*	
Töölön Taisto	Töölö	Töölön Taisto	Nelonen	* *	
Valtti	Puotinkylä	Puotinkylän Valtti	Vitonen	*	
Vatanspor	Helsinki	Vatanspor	Kutonen	*	
Veijarit	Helsinki	Veijarit	Kutonen	*	
Vesa	Töölö	Töölön Vesa	Nelonen	* *	Tier 2 (6 seasons): 1960–65
Vesa/Stadi	Töölö	Töölön Vesa / Stadi	Seiska	*	
Vesa/Töölö	Töölö	Töölön Vesa	Vitonen	*	
WäSy	Helsinki	Wäinämöisen Syke	Kutonen	*	
Ylis-78	Puotila	Ylis-78	Kutonen	*	
Zenith	Myllypuro	Zenith Myllypuro	Nelonen	* *	
Zoom	Helsinki	Zoom	Kutonen	*	

=== Previous clubs ===
Abbreviation	Settlement	Official Name	Division	Cup	Other information
FinnPa	Helsinki	Finnairin Palloilijat	Former club	* * *	History: FinnPa Helsinki until 1999; Jokrut Helsinki from 2000 to 2001; Tier 1 (6 seasons): 1993–98; Tier 2 (14 seasons): 1977, 1981–88, 1991–92, 1999–2001; Tier 3 (6 seasons): 1976, 1978–80, 1989–90
HePa	Helsinki	Hermannin Pallo	Former club		Tier 2 (3 seasons): 1970–72
Herttua	Helsinki	Herttua	Former club		History: HerU Helsinki until 1966; Herttua Helsinki since 1967; Tier 2 (5 seasons): 1964–68
HerU	Helsinki	Herttoniemen Urheilijat	Former club		see Herttua Helsinki
HT	Helsinki	Helsingin Toverit	Former club		see Herttua Helsinki Tier 1 (8 seasons): 1932, 1934-40/41; Tier 2 (5 seasons): 1943/44-45, 1959–61
Hukat	Helsinki	Hukat	Former club		Tier 2 (1 season): 1950
Hurjat	Helsinki	Huopalahden Hurjat	Former club		Tier 3 (3 seasons): 1980–82
Jokerit	Helsinki	Jokerit	Former club		History: ViPK Viipuri until 1944; PK-35 Helsinki (#1) from 1945 to 1998; Jokerit Helsinki since 1999; Tier 1 (5 seasons): 1998–2001, 2003; Tier 2 (3 seasons): 1939, 1997, 2002; Tier 3 (2 seasons): 1995–96
Jokrut	Helsinki	Jokrut	Former club		See FinnPa Helsinki
Jyry	Helsinki	Jyry	Former club		Tier 2 (1 season): 1948
KaPS	Helsinki	Kallion Palloseura	Former club		Tier 2 (12 seasons): 1945–53, 1967, 1971
Zyklon	Helsinki	Jalkapalloseura Zyklon	No record	*	Last record Kolmonen in 2009.

== League Competitions ==
SPL Helsingin piiri run the following league competitions:

=== Men's Football ===
- Division 3 – Kolmonen – one section
- Division 4 – Nelonen – two sections
- Division 5 – Vitonen – three sections
- Division 6 – Kutonen – four sections
- Division 7 – Seiska – three sections

=== Ladies Football ===
- Division 3 – Kolmonen – one section
- Division 4 and 5 – Nelonen and Vitonen – four sections
