= Kivikko =

Coordinates: 60°14′N 25°03′E

Kivikko Stensböle
- Helsinki Subdivision
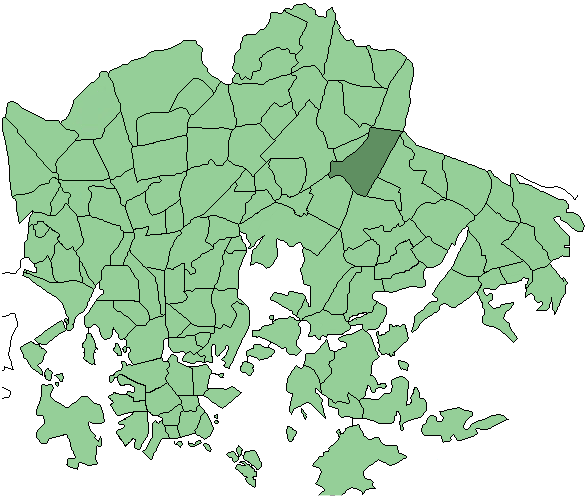
- Position of Kivikko within Helsinki
- Country: Finland
- Region: Uusimaa
- Sub-region: Greater Helsinki
- Municipality: Helsinki
- District: Eastern
- Subdivision regions: none
- Area: 2.84 km^{2} (1.10 sq mi)
- Population (2005): 5,006
  - Density: 1,763/km^{2} (4,570/sq mi)
- Postal codes: 00940
- Subdivision number: 474
- Neighbouring subdivisions: Vesala, Kontula, Kurkimäki, Myllypuro, Latokartano, Ala-Malmi, Tattariharju, Malmin lentokenttä, Jakomäki

Kivikko (Swedish: Stensböle) is a quarter of Helsinki, the capital of Finland. Part of the Mellunkylä district, it was built during the 1990s and the first decade of the 2000s. The quarter is located on the west side of Kontula, an important subregional centre and will have a population of 5000 once completed.

Kivikko is especially favoured by families with children. 14% of the inhabitants are immigrants or have immigrant roots, which is more than in most of Helsinki. There is also student housing in the area. However, Kivikko is generally more peaceful and less densely built than nearby Kontula.

== Politics ==
Results of the 2022 Municipal Elections in Kivikko:

| Party Name | Percentage of Votes | Number of Votes |
| The Finnish Social Democratic Party (SDP) | 27.6% | 462 |
| The Left Alliance (Left) | 24.7% | 413 |
| Centre Party of Finland (Cen) | 19.3% | 323 |
| The Finns Party (Finns) | 13.8% | 231 |
| National Coalition Party (NCP) | 8.0% | 133 |
| Lapin Sitoutumattomat -yhteislista (YL1) | 3.5% | 58 |
| The Greens (Green) | 1.3% | 22 |

Results of the 2011 Finnish parliamentary election in Kivikko:

- True Finns 27.4%
- Social Democratic Party 22.5%
- National Coalition Party 13.5%
- Green League 11.8%
- Left Alliance 11.6%
- Centre Party 3.6%
- Christian Democrats 3.3%
- Swedish People's Party 2.3%
