= Vartiokylä =

Coordinates: 60°13′N 025°06′E

Vartiokylä Botby
- Helsinki Subdivision
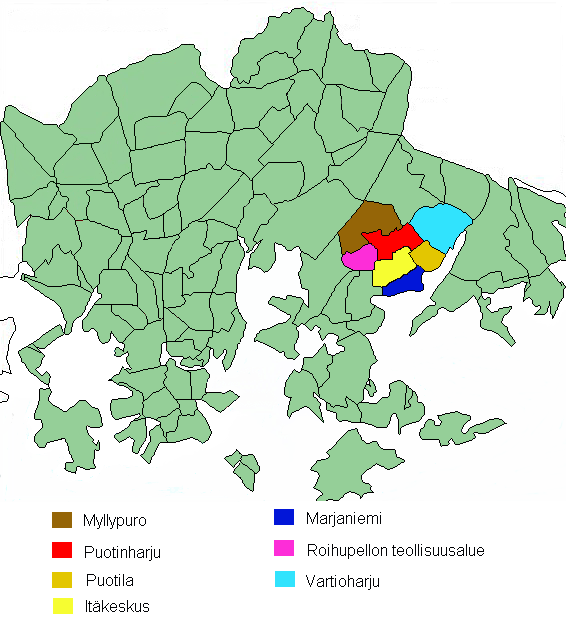
- Position of Vartiokylä within Helsinki
- Country: Finland
- Region: Uusimaa
- Sub-region: Greater Helsinki
- Municipality: Helsinki
- District: Eastern
- Subdivision regions: Vartioharju, Puotila, Puotinharju, Myllypuro, Marjaniemi, Roihupellon teollisuusalue, Itäkeskus
- Area: 10.03 km^{2} (3.87 sq mi)
- Population (2005): 30,403
  - Density: 3,031/km^{2} (7,850/sq mi)
- Postal codes: 00900, 00910, 00920, 00930, 00950
- Subdivision number: 45
- Neighbouring subdivisions: Viikki, Herttoniemi, Tammisalo, Mellunkylä, Vartiosaari, Vuosaari

Vartiokylä (Swedish: Botby) is a district in the East Helsinki area of Helsinki, the capital of Finland. Its name is derived from the ruins of an eleventh-century fortress on the Linnanvuori hill in Vartioharju, one of Vartiokylä's subdivisions. The working population of Helsinki started building their houses in the area after the completion of Uusi Porvoontie, a road to the downtown, in the 1930s. Vartiokylä became a part of Helsinki in 1946. Larger-scale construction of suburban housing estates, such as Puotila, started in the 1960s. During the next decade, the building of Itäkeskus began, and it became the largest service centre for Vartiokylä and East Helsinki.

Public transport in the area relies heavily on the Helsinki Metro. The stations of Itäkeskus, Myllypuro and Puotila service the neighbourhood. Several bus lines serve the areas not within walking distance of the stations. Two major highways, Itäväylä and Kehä I, intersect in Vartiokylä.

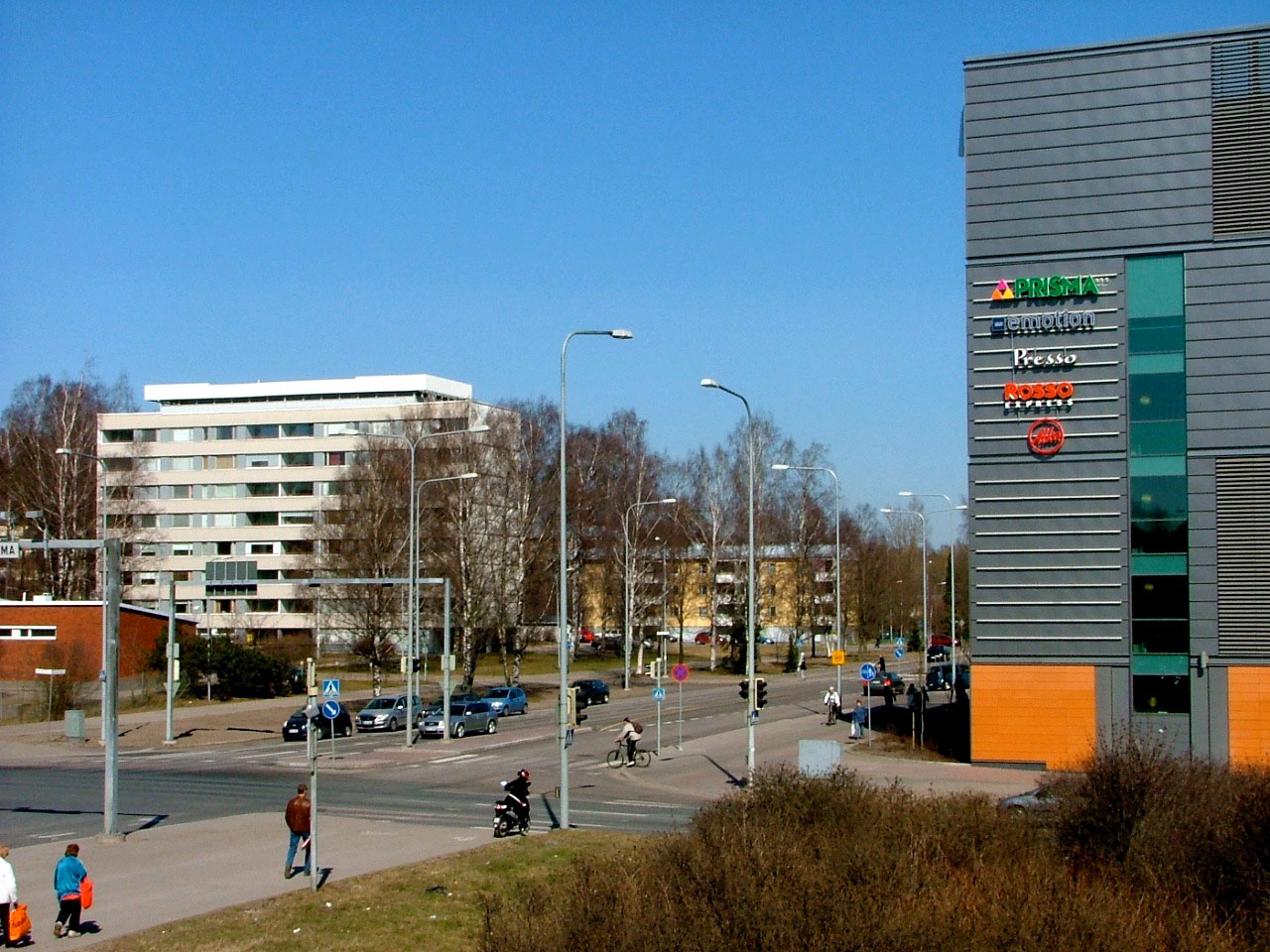
Residential buildings of Puotinharju, and a branch of Prisma hypermarket

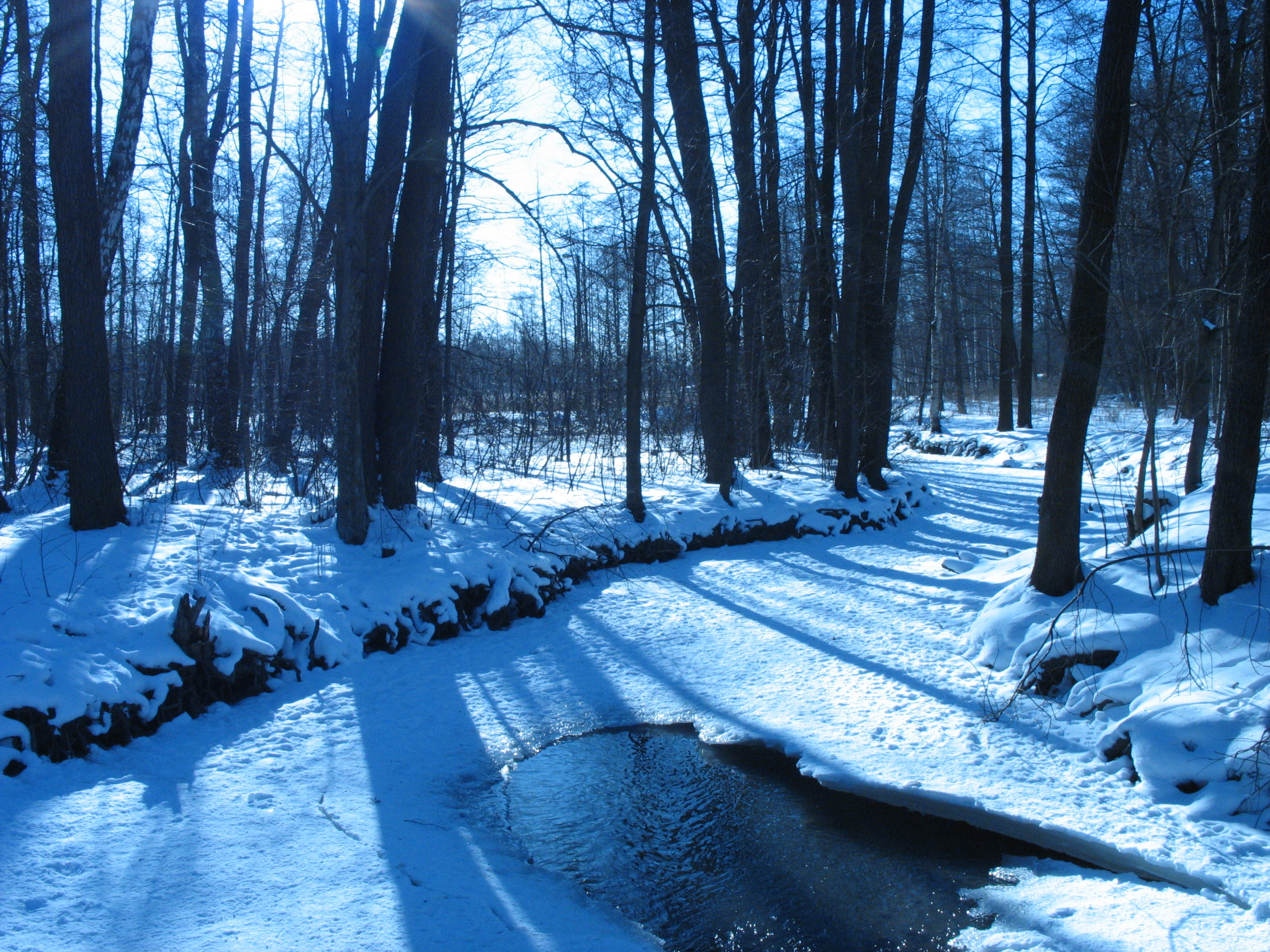
Winter time in Marjaniemi

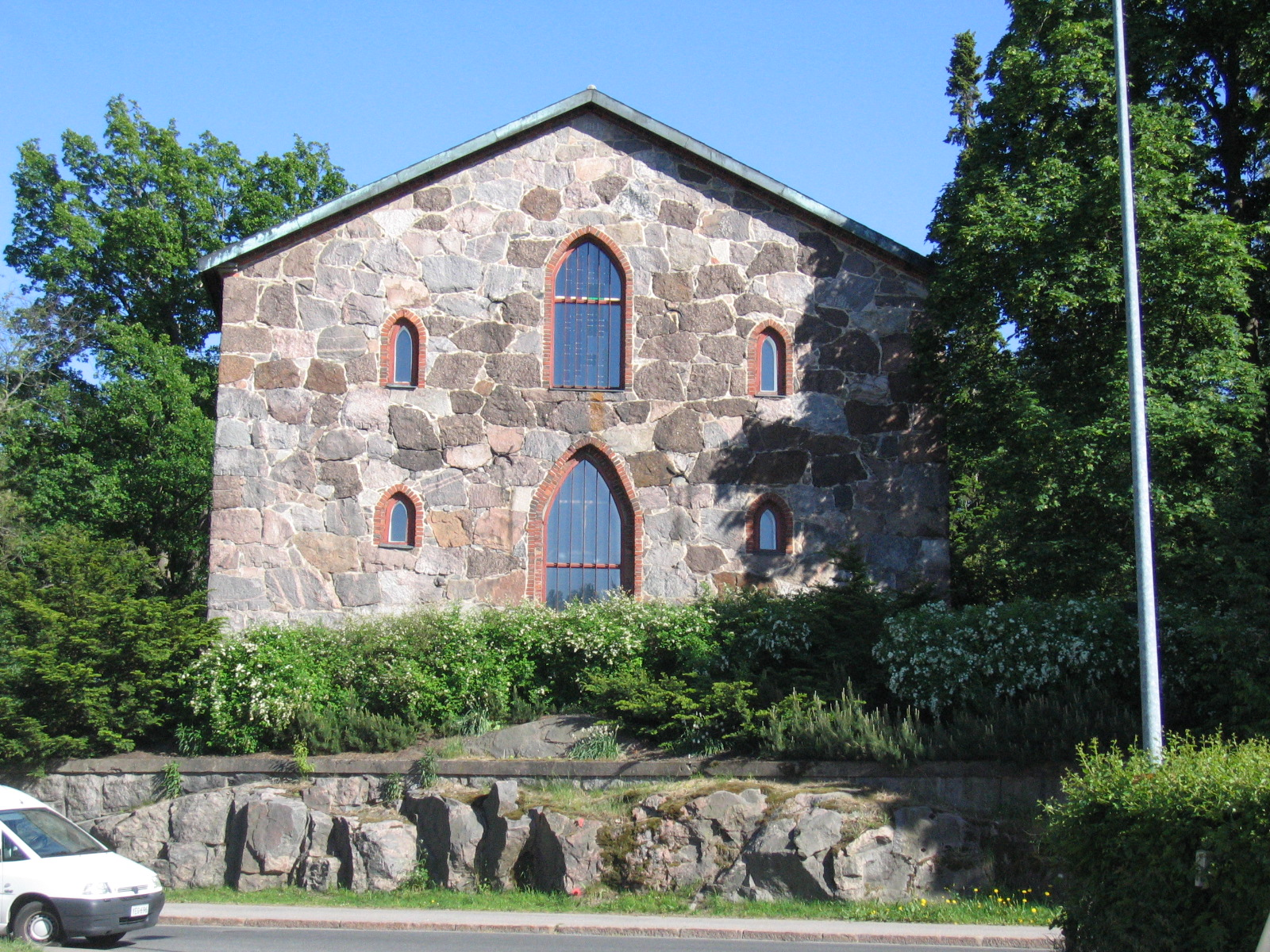
Puotilankappeli in Puotila

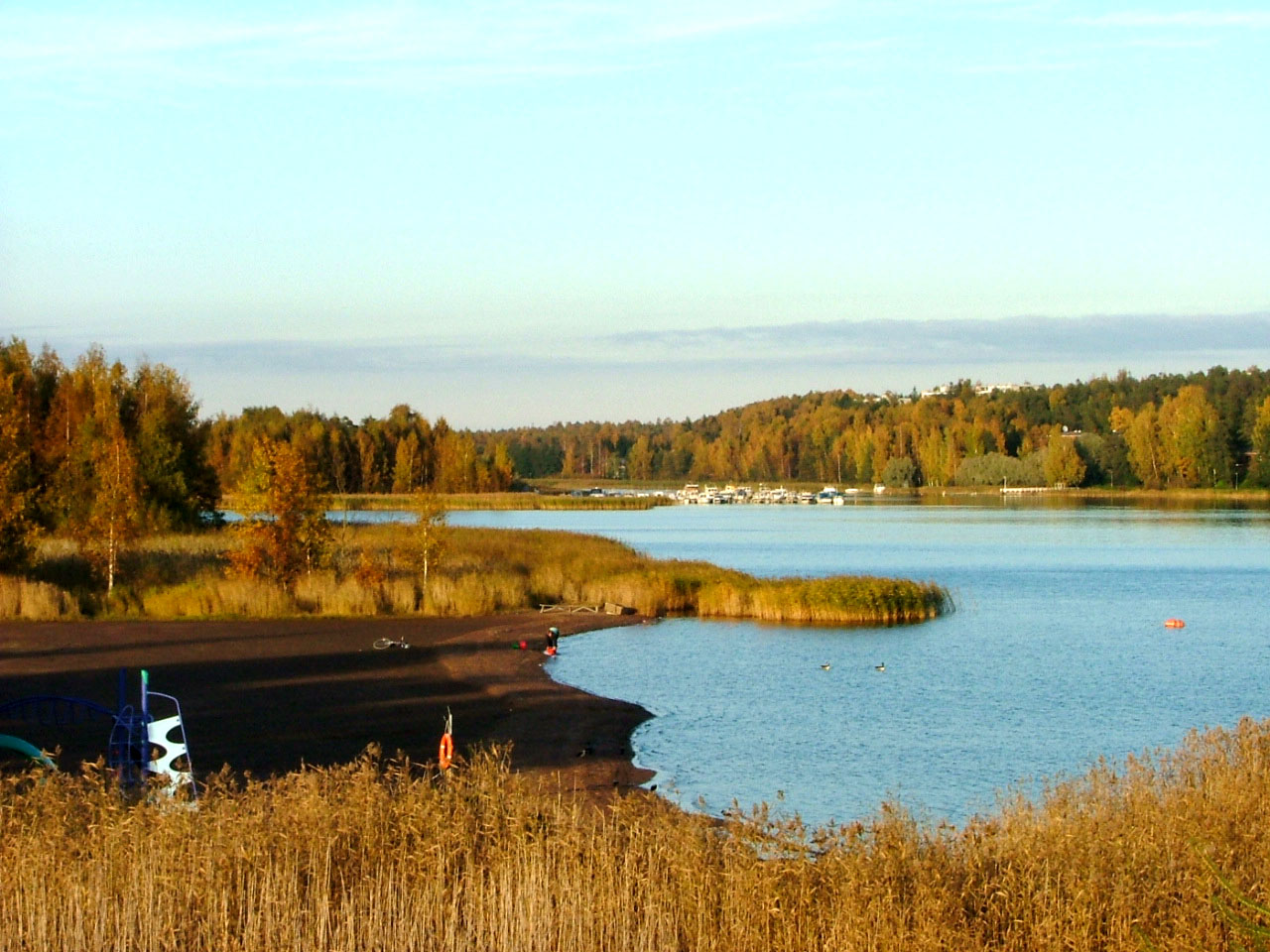
Autumnal view on Vartiokylänlahti bay
