= Kontula metro station =

Helsinki Metro station

Kontula Gårdsbacka
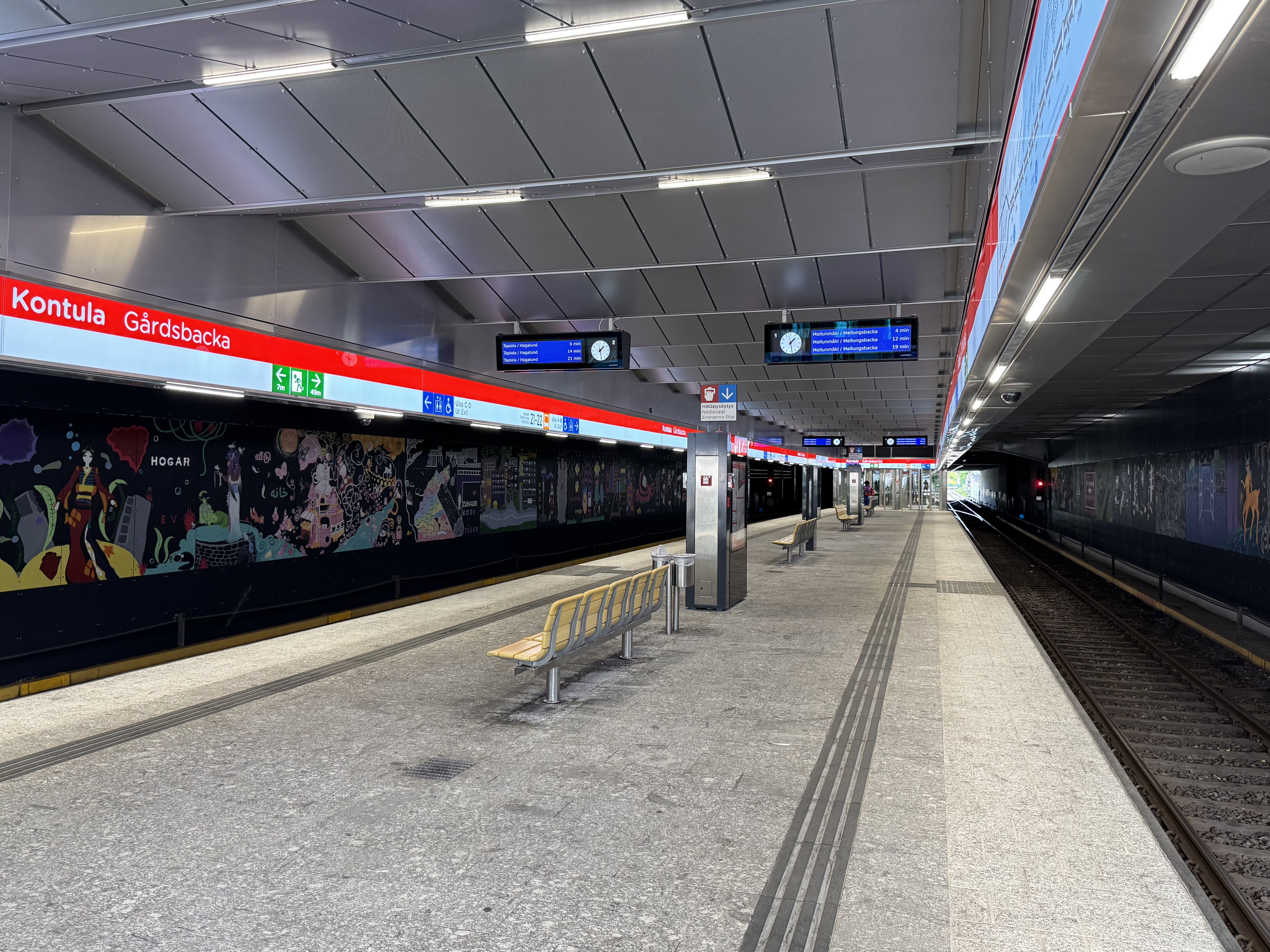

General information
- Location: Kontulantie 20, Helsinki
- Coordinates: 60°14′10″N 25°5′1″E
- System: Helsinki Metro station
- Owner: HKL
- Platforms: 1
- Tracks: 2
- Connections: HSL bus lines 57 92N 94 94A 94B 94N 95 560 812

Construction
- Structure type: Below grade
- Parking: 53
- Cycle facilities: 273
- Accessible: Yes

Other information
- Fare zone: B

History
- Opened: 21 October 1986

Passengers
- 21,400 daily

Services
Preceding station	Helsinki Metro	Following station
Myllypuro towards Tapiola	M2	Mellunmäki Terminus
Location

Kontula metro station (Finnish: Kontulan metroasema, Swedish: Gårdsbackas metrostation) is a ground-level station on the M2 line (Tapiola - Mellunmäki) of the Helsinki Metro. There are 273 bicycle and 53 car parking spaces at Kontula. The station serves the district of Kontula in East Helsinki.

Kontula was opened on 21 October 1986 and was designed by architect bureau Toivo Karhunen Oy. It is located 1.4 kilometers north of Myllypuro metro station and 1.6 kilometers west of Mellunmäki metro station.

== Pictures ==
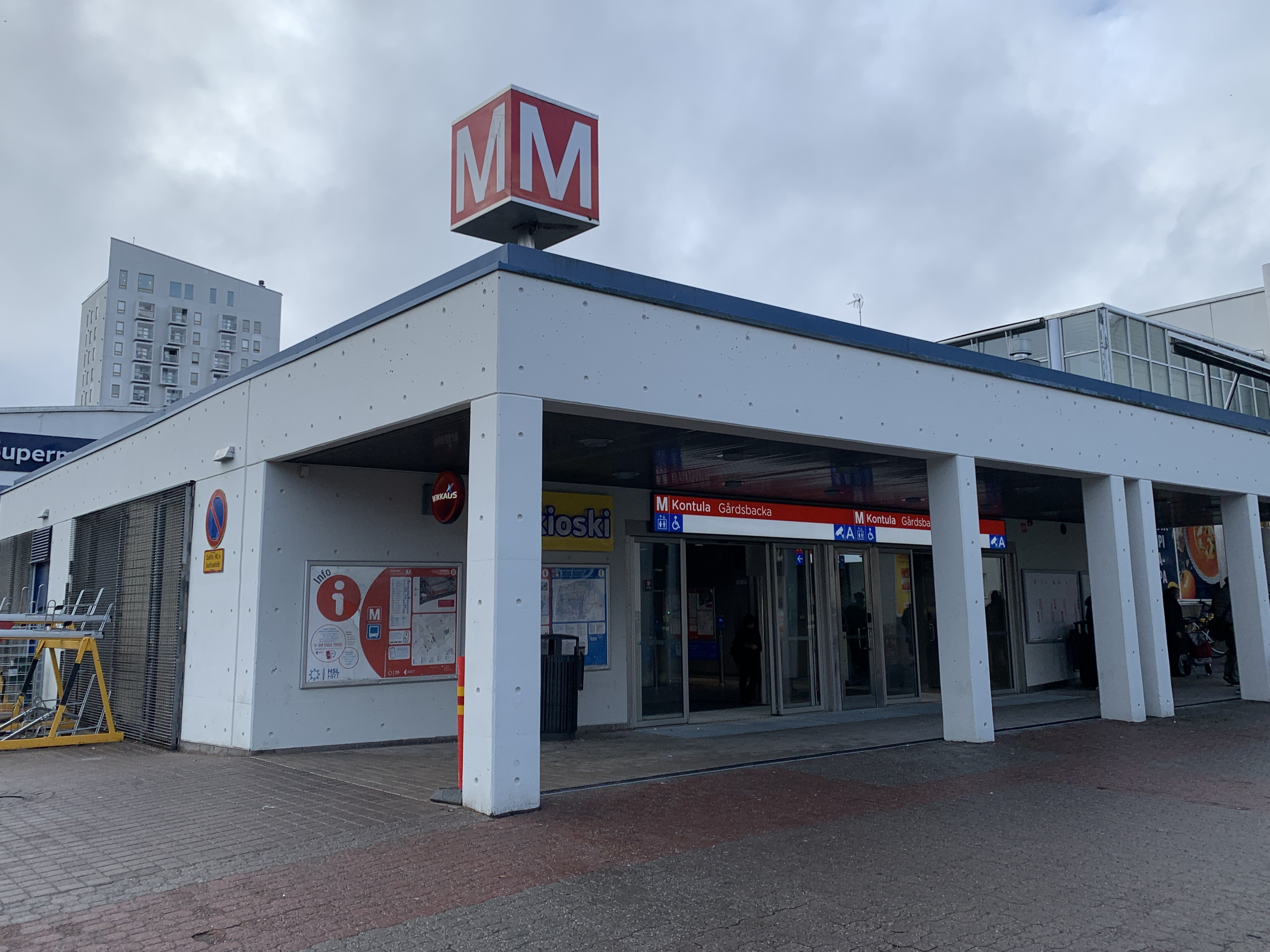
Eastern (A) entrance

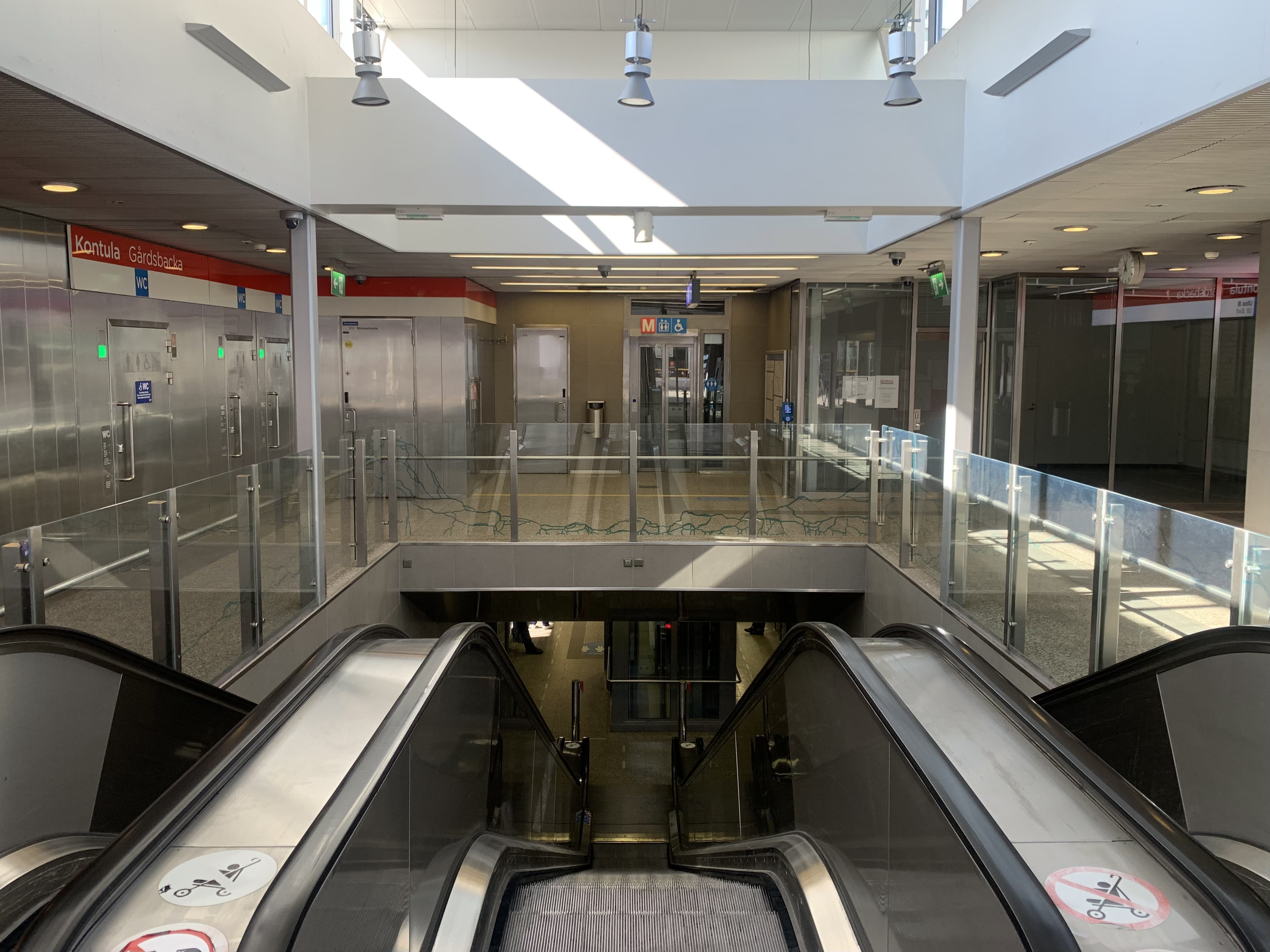
Escalators

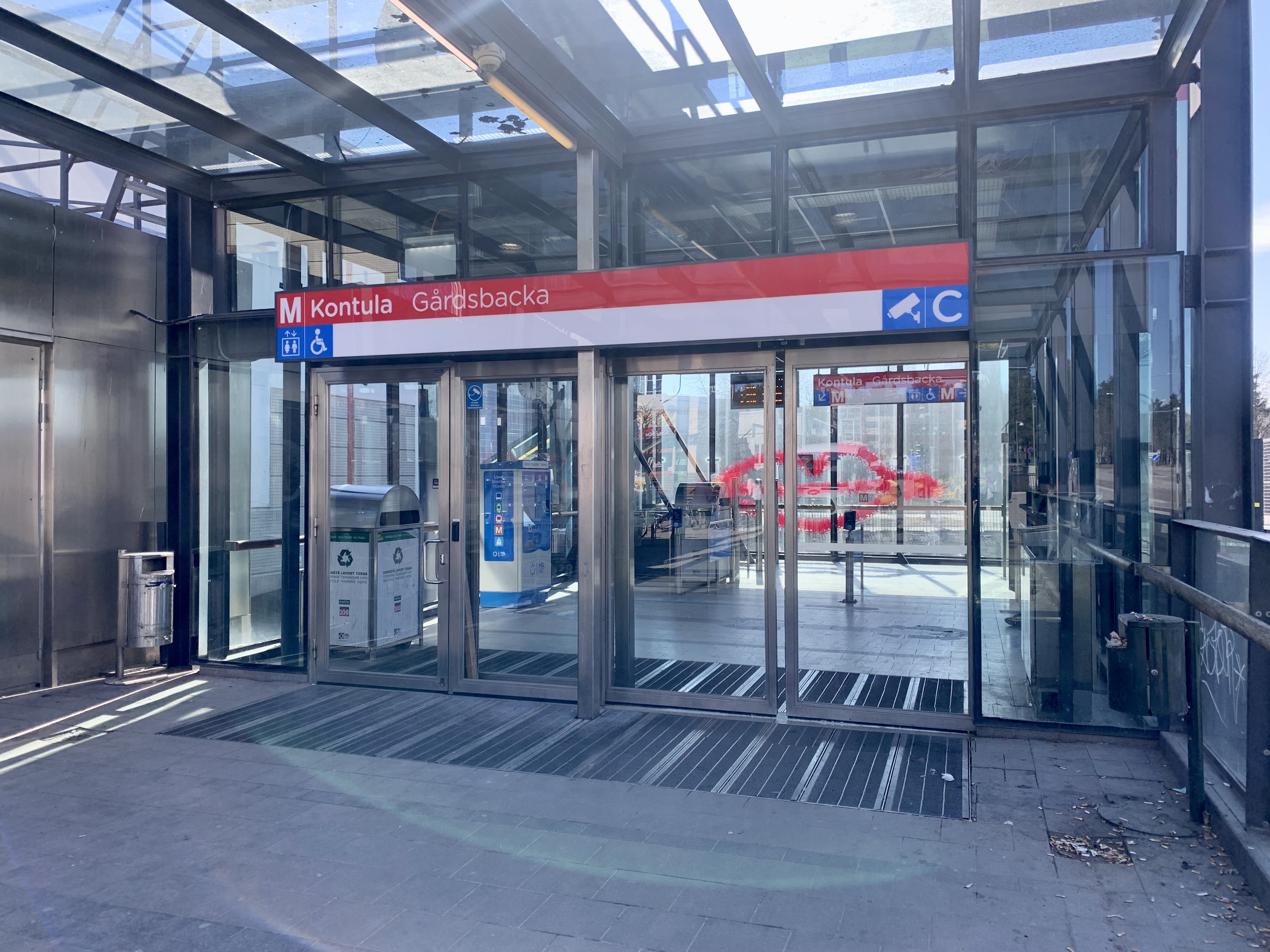
The middle entrance built in 2002

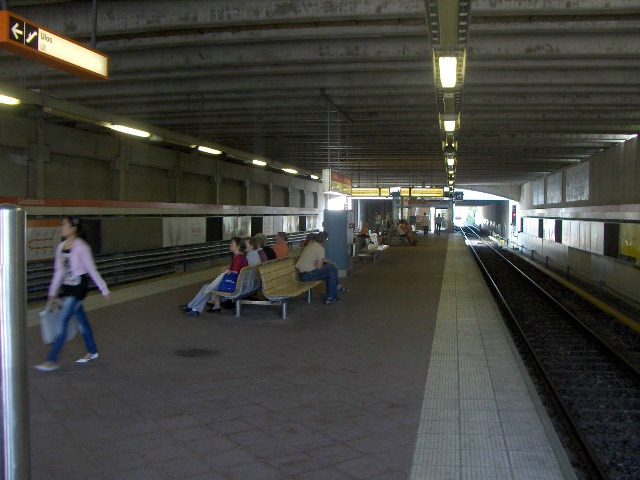
The station before renovations
