= Kontula, Helsinki =

Coordinates: 60.23586°N 25.08325°E

Kontula Gårdsbacka
- Helsinki Subdivision
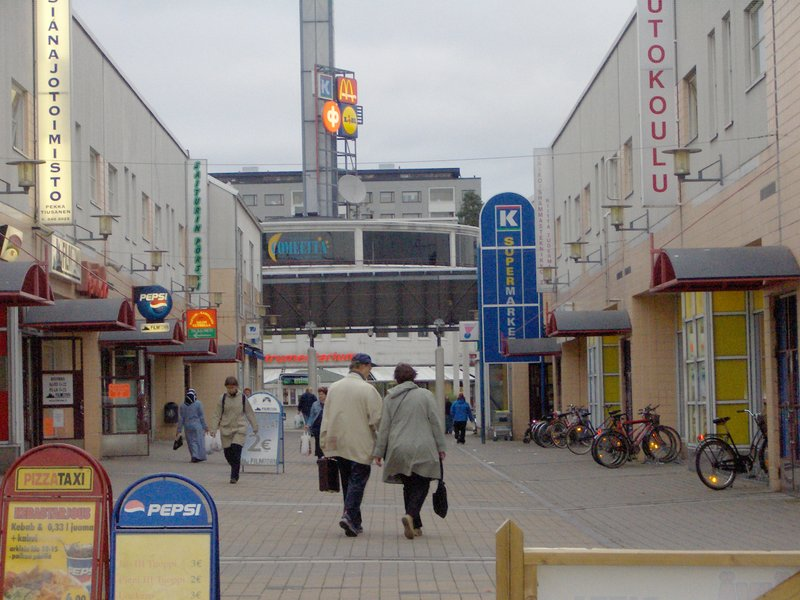

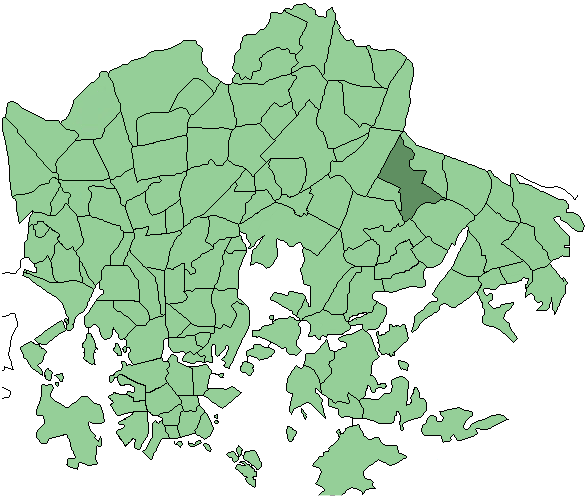
- Position of Kontula within Helsinki
- Country: Finland
- Region: Uusimaa
- Sub-region: Greater Helsinki
- Municipality: Helsinki
- District: Eastern
- Subdivision regions: none
- Area: 2.71 km^{2} (1.05 sq mi)
- Population (2006): 13,172
  - Density: 4,821/km^{2} (12,490/sq mi)
- Postal codes: 00940
- Subdivision number: 471
- Neighbouring subdivisions: Vesala, Vartioharju, Myllypuro, Kurkimäki, Kivikko, Mellunmäki

Kontula (Swedish: Gårdsbacka) is a quarter of Helsinki, Finland, part of the Mellunkylä neighbourhood. Kontula was built mostly in the 1960s and 1970s when more housing was required in Helsinki. Many people from the city centre moved to Kontula; due to its little higher than average concentration of government tenant housing complexes, immigrant and refugee population it is regarded as an average eastern Helsinki suburb.

Kontula has generally been considered one of the most notorious suburbs in East Helsinki largely due to prevailing incidents of violence and drug dealing, the latter of which local youths actively run a drug trade near the shopping area and the metro station. Despite its mixed reputation, it might also be the clue to its attractiveness, because Kontula pops up in many movies, books, and songs.

The metro was expanded to Kontula in 1986, which made the area easy to reach. The Kontula Metro Station is daily used by 20,000 people.

In 2006, the Finnish Local Heritage Foundation picked Kontula as the Borough of the Year in Finland.

== Buildings ==
=== Kontulan Ostoskeskus, the mall ===
Kontula offers services to its inhabitants. There are various grocery stores, banks, pharmacies and over 20 shops and around 20 bars, Kontulan Ostoskeskus (The Shopping Centre or the mall) opened in 1967. The Shopping Centre also includes the health centre, a library, a swimming pool, gym, and a skateboard hall. There are also food production facilities in the area, for example, the famed ice cream house Kolme kaveria ('Three friends').

=== Mikaelinkirkko ===
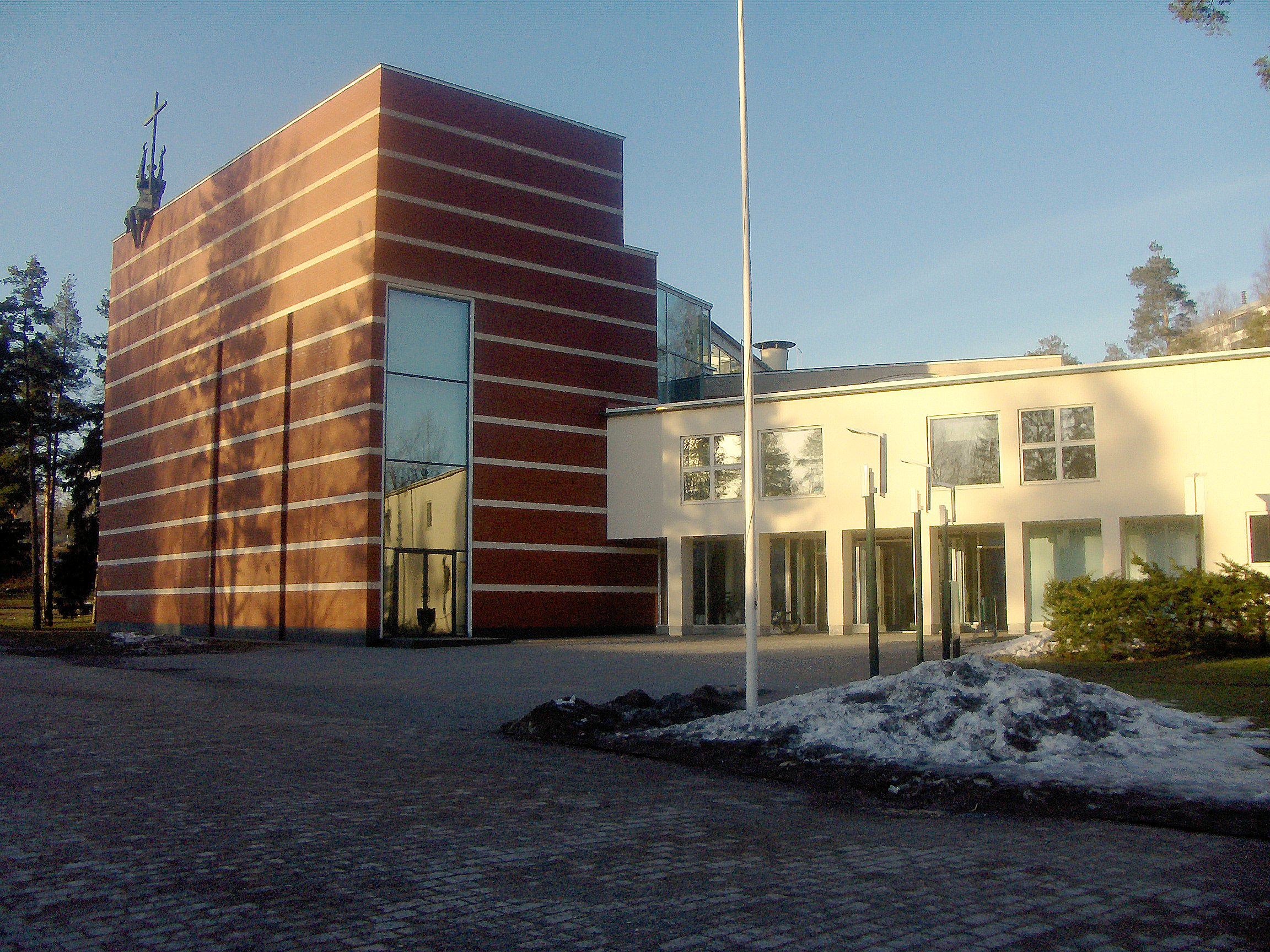
Mikaelinkirkko (church) in Kontula.

The church representing modernist church architecture, St. Michael's Church (Mikaelinkirkko), was consecrated on May 7, 1988. In 1980, the Helsinki Parish Association announced an architectural competition for the new church, which was attended by 138 architects. Construction was due to begin as early as 1984, but because the winning draftsman was atheist, the plan had to be abandoned, and the new plan took the second place work of competition on which the current church was based.
