= Myllypuro metro station =

Metro station in Helsinki, Finland

Myllypuro Kvarnbäcken
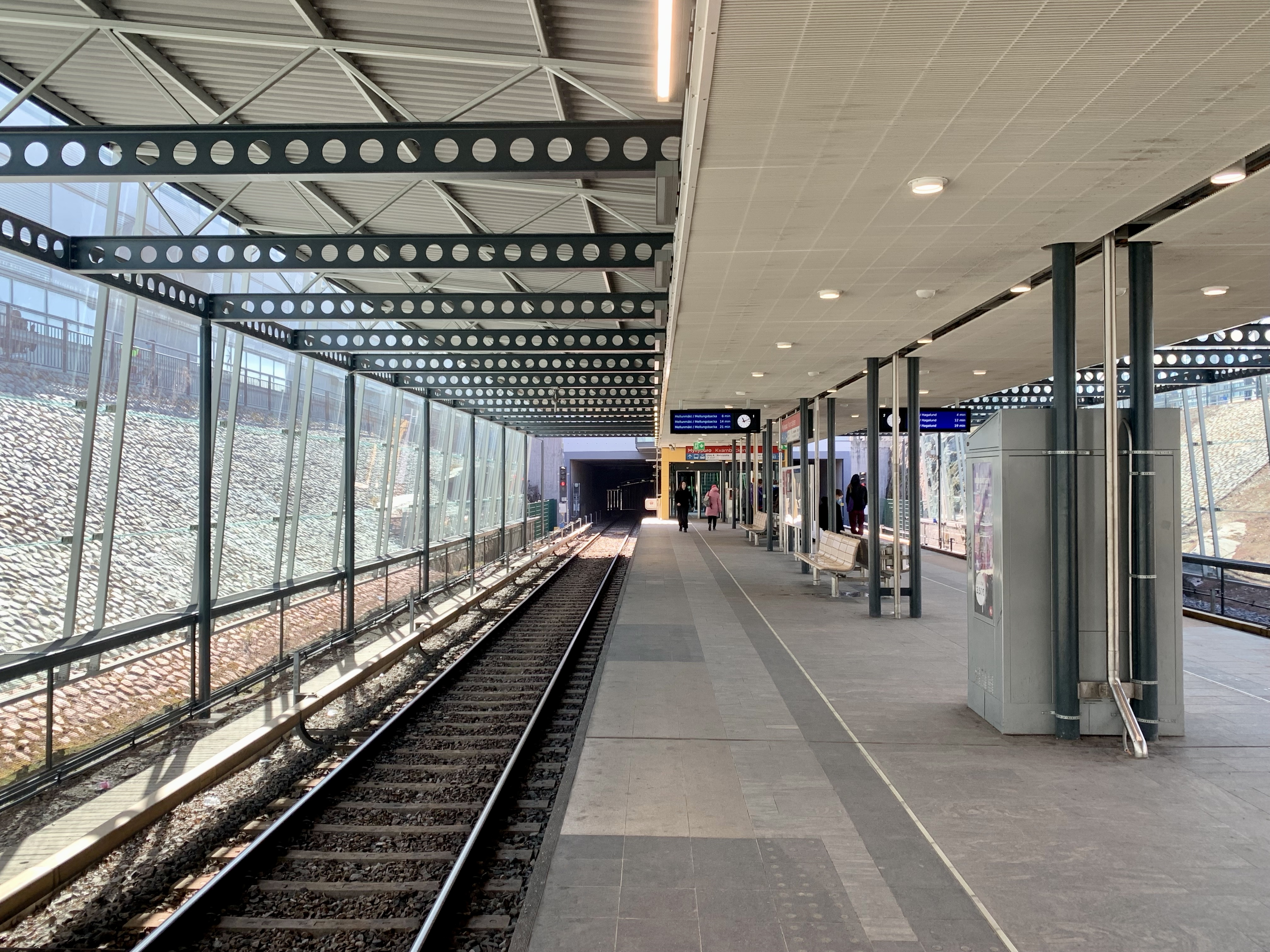
- Platform in 2022

General information
- Location: Myllyaukio 2, Helsinki; Myllypurontie 5, Helsinki; Finland
- Coordinates: 60°13′30″N 25°4′32″E
- System: Helsinki Metro station
- Owner: H K L
- Platforms: 1
- Tracks: 2
- Connections: HSL bus lines 54 92 92N 94N 506 554 561 805 562 812

Construction
- Structure type: Open cut
- Parking: 40
- Cycle facilities: 97
- Accessible: Yes

Other information
- Fare zone: B

History
- Opened: 21 October 1986

Passengers
- 14,000 daily

Services
Preceding station	Helsinki Metro	Following station
Itäkeskus towards Tapiola	M2	Kontula towards Mellunmäki
Location

Myllypuro metro station (Finnish: Myllypuron metroasema, Swedish: Kvarnbäckens metrostation - "Mill Creek") is a ground-level station on lines M2 (Tapiola - Mellunmäki) and M2M (Matinkylä - Mellunmäki) of the Helsinki Metro. There are 97 bicycle and 40 car parking spaces at Myllypuro. The station serves the quarter of Myllypuro in East Helsinki.

The station was opened on 21 October 1986 and was designed by the architect firm Toivo Karhunen Oy. It is located 1.9 kilometers north of Itäkeskus and 1.4 kilometers south of Kontula.

One of Metropolia's campuses is located in Myllypuro, which is why the idea of changing the station's name from Myllypuro to Metropolia has also been brought up.

== Pictures ==
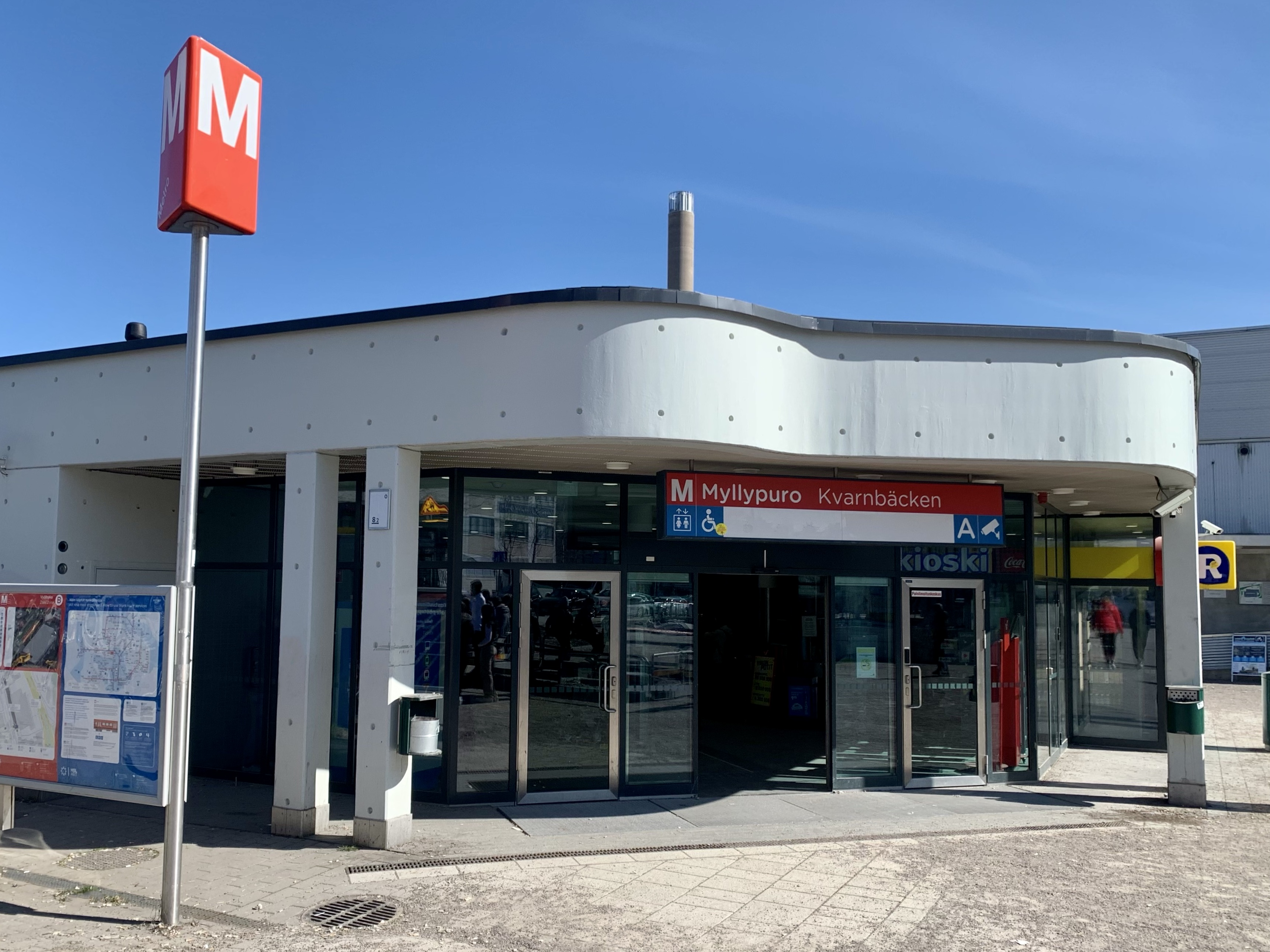
Entrance

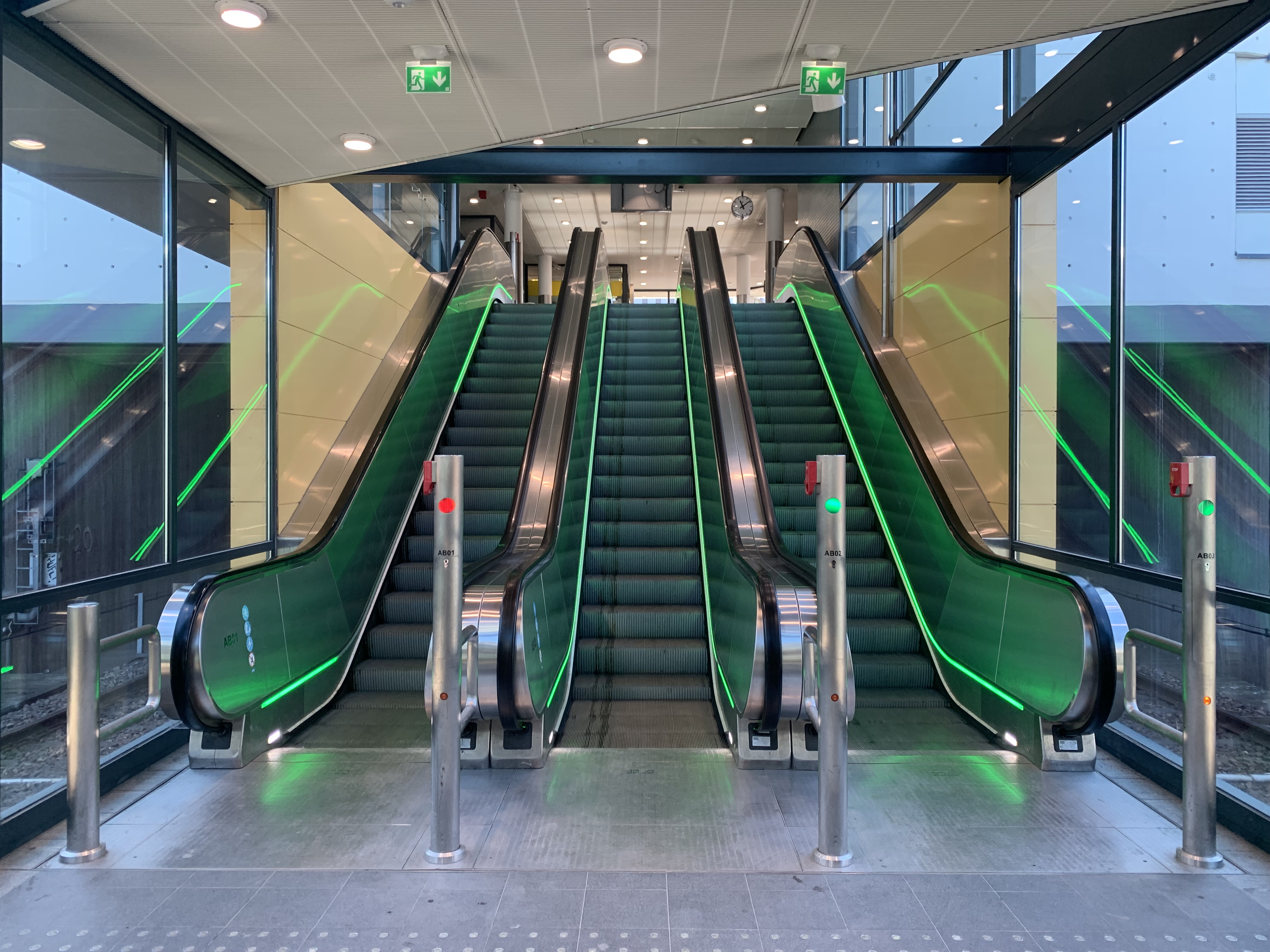
Escalators

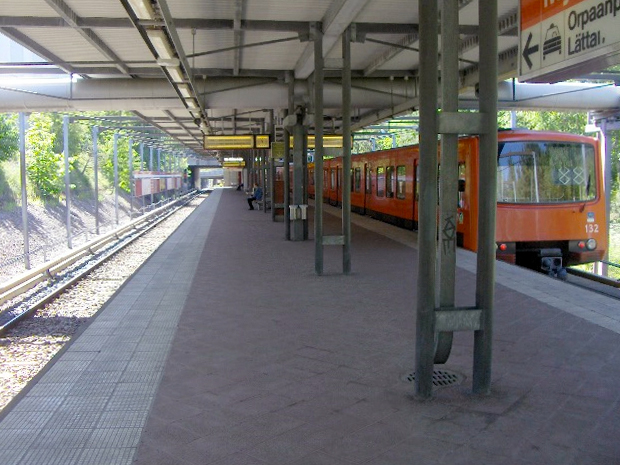
The station before renovations in 2006
