= Puotila, Helsinki =

Puotila (in Finnish) Botby gård (in Swedish)
- Neighborhood of Helsinki
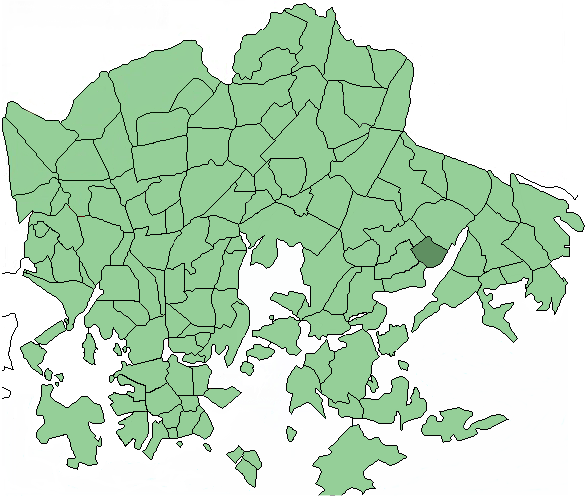
- Location in Helsinki
- Coordinates: 60.212408°N 25.096145°E
- Country: Finland
- Province: Southern Finland
- Region: Uusimaa
- Sub-region: Helsinki
- Time zone: UTC+2 (EET)
  - Summer (DST): UTC+3 (EEST)

Puotila (Finnish), Botby gård (Swedish) is a neighborhood of the Vartiokylä subdivision in eastern Helsinki, Finland. Construction of the concrete suburb started in the 1960s. Puotila metro station was opened in 1998.

== Gallery ==
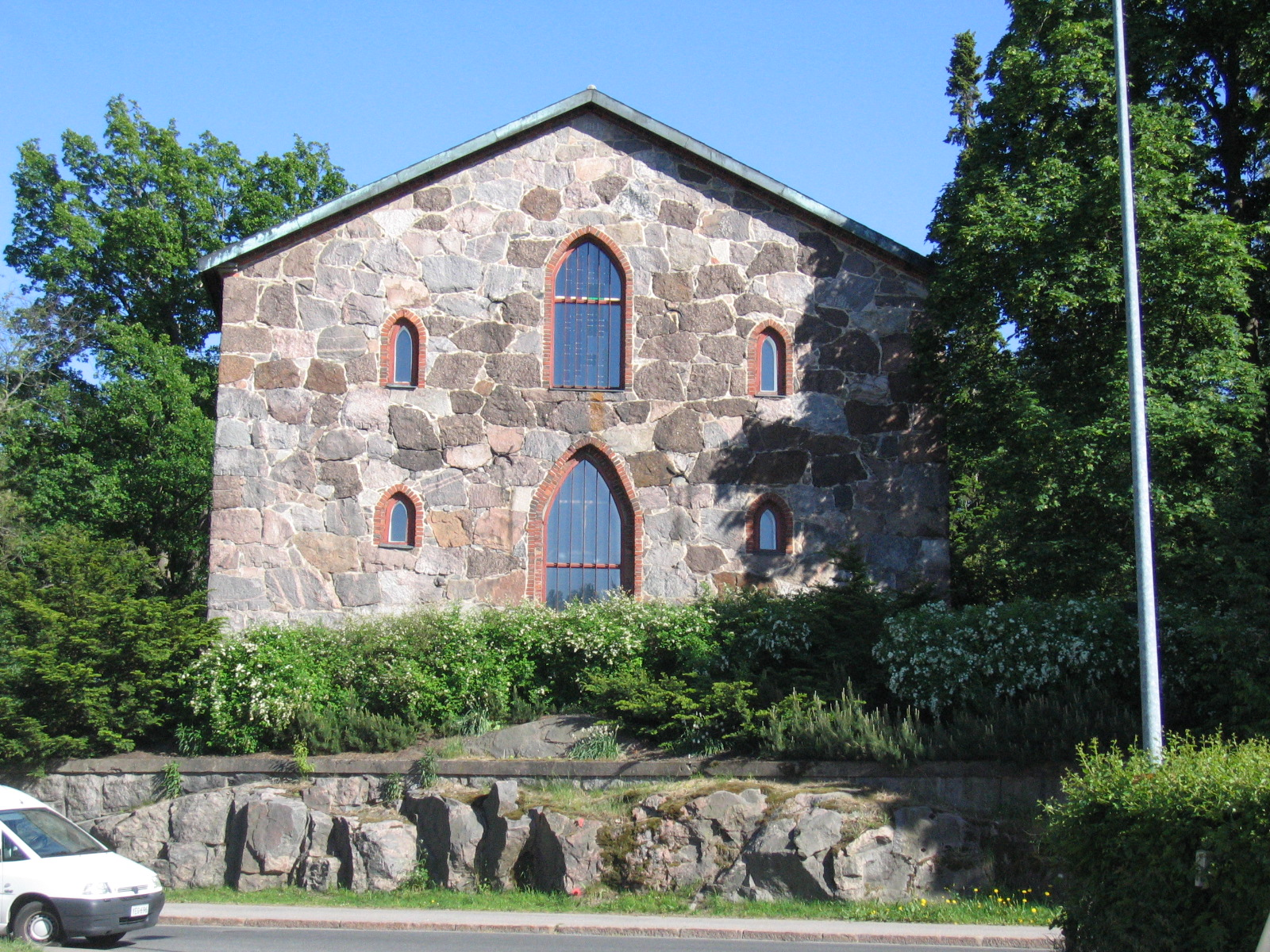
Puotila Chapel

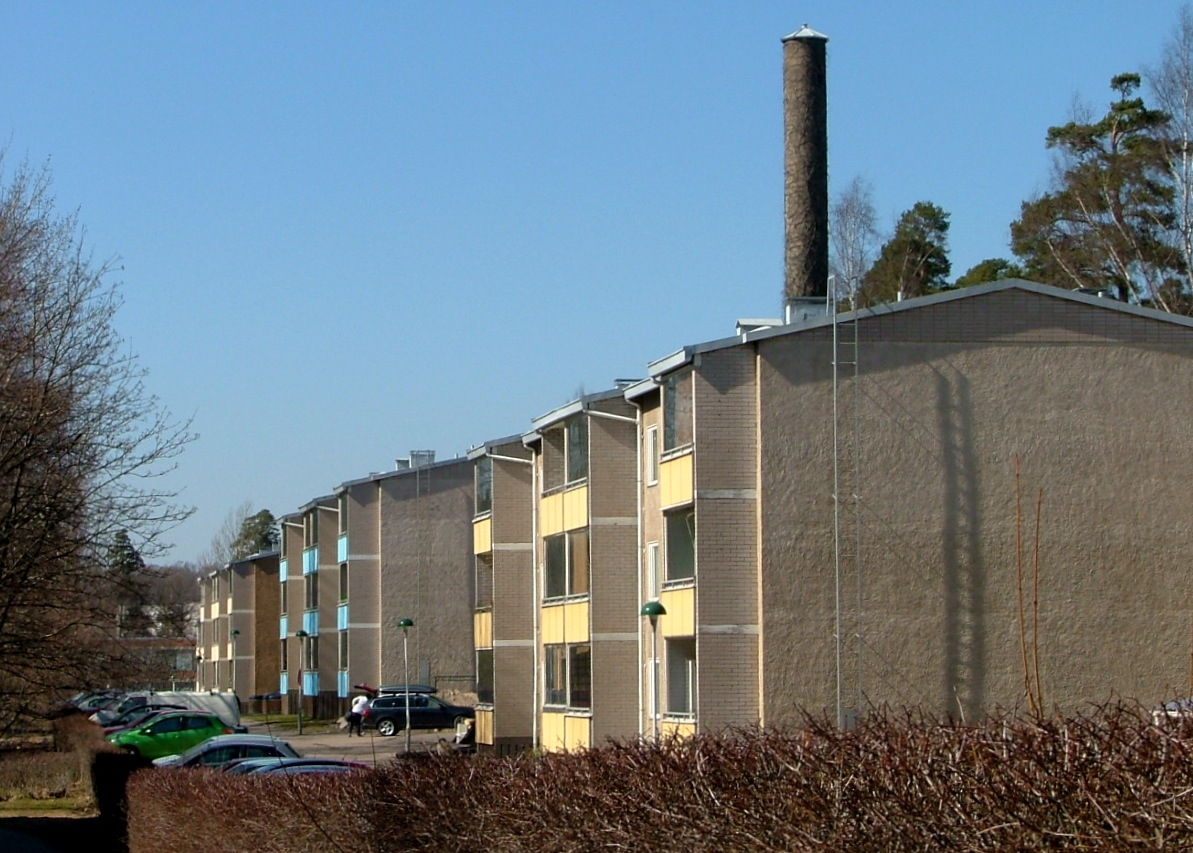
Apartment buildings constructed in the early 1960s.
