= 3 kaveria =

Finnish brand of ice cream

3 kaveria (English: 3 Friends) is a Finnish brand of ice cream owned by the Finnish company Kolmen Kaverin Jäätelö Oy in Kontula, Helsinki. 3 kaveria was Finland's most popular brand of ice cream in Finland in 2017, and it is also sold in Sweden under the name Tre Vänners Glass. Sales in Sweden started in January 2017. In 2018 sales expanded to Germany, where the ice cream is marketed as 3 Freunde Eis.

The company sells ice cream in 500 millilitre packages. In 2020 the company launched five ice cream bars as the first minor ice cream company in Finland.

== Brand history ==
The 3 kaveria ice cream brand was created by Heikki Huotari, Ilkka Wikholm and Sauli Saarnisto, who got the idea of making ice cream in 2012. Production started with an ice cream machine costing 300 euros, after which the first ice cream can was sold in February 2013. The three founders also went to Italy to learn to make ice cream on an ice cream making course.

The company has been mostly using Finnish ingredients in its products.

In 2020 Kolmen Kaverin Jäätelö Oy had a revenue of 7.5 million euro and a profit of 1.1 million euro.
