= FC Kontu =

Finnish football club

- Full name: FC Kontu
- Founded: 1967; 58 years ago
- Ground: Kontulan liikuntapuisto, Helsinki, Finland
- Capacity: 5,000
- Chairman: Juha Granbom
- Coach: Anssi Salmi; Jari Hänninen; Juha Korhonen (GK)
- League: Kolmonen
Home colours	Away colours

FC Kontu is a football club from Helsinki, Finland. It serves Kontula in East Helsinki and the immediately surrounding area. The club was formed in 1967 under the name Kontulan Urheilijat (abbreviated KontU), the name being changed in 1994. The men's football first team currently plays in the Kolmonen (Third Division) and their home ground is at the Kontulan liikuntapuisto. The club also run a Ladies team that play at the same level in Women's Football.

== Background ==
The club was founded in 1967 and has specialised in the sports of football, ice hockey, basketball and bowling during its history. The club has concentrated exclusively on football since 1992. In its early years the club played in the lower divisions of the Finnish football league but were promoted from the Kolmonen (Third Division) in 1983 and from the Kakkonen (Second Division) in 1985.

FC Kontu (formerly Kontulan Urheilijat) has played 10 seasons in the Ykkönen (First Division), the second tier of Finnish football in the years 1986–91 and 1993–96. They also have had five spells covering 12 seasons in the third tier, the Kakkonen (Second Division), in 1984–85, 1992, 1997, 1999–2000, 2003–08. The highest ever attendance for a KontU match was in 1986 when 5,547 people attended the home game with Kemin Palloseura.

The Ladies Team gained promotion to the Women's Premier Division (Naisten SM-sarja) in 1986 where they remained until the 2000 season when they withdrew. The 1990s were a great period for the team, the highlight being in 1993 when KontU won the Naisten SM-sarja championship. They were unsuccessful in the Premier Division/Division One 2001 promotion/relegation group and the Premier Division/Division One 2003 promotion/relegation playoff . However luck was on the club’ side and they inherited the place of HJK-J Helsinki in the Premier Division for the 2004 season. The team gained only 1 point in 18 games and were relegated again.

The Ladies Team bounced back a few years later winning promotion to the Premier Division (now known as the Kansallainen Liiga) at the end of the 2007 season. In 2008 they finished in a meritable 5th position in the Naisten Liiga but sadly withdrew for the 2009 season. The team now play at 3 levels lower in the Kolmonen (Third Division).

FC Kontu has a total of around 700 registered players

== Season to season ==
Season	Level	Division	Section	Administration	Position	Movements
1971	Tier 4	IV Divisioona (Fourth Division)	Group 1	Helsinki & Uusimaa (SPL Helsinki)	8th	
1972	Tier 4	IV Divisioona (Fourth Division)	Group 1	Helsinki & Uusimaa (SPL Helsinki)	3rd	
1973	Tier 5	IV Divisioona (Fourth Division)	Group 1	Helsinki & Uusimaa(SPL Helsinki)	1st	Promoted
1974	Tier 4	III Divisioona (Third Division)	Group 2	Helsinki & Uusimaa (SPL Helsinki)	5th	
1975	Tier 4	III Divisioona (Third Division)	Group 2	Helsinki & Uusimaa (SPL Helsinki)	10th	Relegated
1976	Tier 5	IV Divisioona (Fourth Division)	Group 3	Helsinki & Uusimaa(SPL Helsinki)	8th	
1977	Tier 5	IV Divisioona (Fourth Division)	Group 4	Helsinki & Uusimaa(SPL Helsinki)	2nd	
1978	Tier 5	IV Divisioona (Fourth Division)	Group 4	Helsinki & Uusimaa(SPL Helsinki)	1st	Promoted
1979	Tier 4	III Divisioona (Third Division)	Group 1	Helsinki & Uusimaa (SPL Helsinki)	9th	
1980	Tier 4	III Divisioona (Third Division)	Group 1	Helsinki & Uusimaa (SPL Helsinki)	12th	Relegated
1981	Tier 5	IV Divisioona (Fourth Division)	Group 1	Helsinki & Uusimaa(SPL Helsinki)	1st	Promotion Playoff - Promoted
1982	Tier 4	III Divisioona (Third Division)	Group 2	Helsinki & Uusimaa (SPL Helsinki)	1st	Promotion Playoff
1983	Tier 4	III Divisioona (Third Division)	Group 2	Helsinki & Uusimaa (SPL Helsinki)	1st	Promotion Playoff - Promoted
1984	Tier 3	II Divisioona (Second Division)	East Group	Finnish FA (Suomen Pallolitto)	3rd	
1985	Tier 3	II Divisioona (Second Division)	West Group	Finnish FA (Suomen Pallolitto)	1st	Promoted
1986	Tier 2	I Divisioona (First Division)		Finnish FA (Suomen Pallolitto)	2nd	Promotion playoff
1987	Tier 2	I Divisioona (First Division)		Finnish FA (Suomen Pallolitto)	3rd	
1988	Tier 2	I Divisioona (First Division)		Finnish FA (Suomen Pallolitto)	4th	
1989	Tier 2	I Divisioona (First Division)		Finnish FA (Suomen Pallolitto)	9th	
1990	Tier 2	I Divisioona (First Division)		Finnish FA (Suomen Pallolitto)	7th	
1991	Tier 2	I Divisioona (First Division)		Finnish FA (Suomen Pallolitto)	11th	Relegated
1992	Tier 3	II Divisioona (Second Division)	East Group	Finnish FA (Suomen Pallolitto)	2nd	Promotion group 1st, Promoted
1993	Tier 2	I Divisioona (First Division)		Finnish FA (Suomen Pallolitto)	2nd	Promotion group 8th
1994	Tier 2	Ykkönen (First Division)		Finnish FA (Suomen Pallolitto)	5th	
1995	Tier 2	Ykkönen (First Division)		Finnish FA (Suomen Pallolitto)	8th	
1996	Tier 2	Ykkönen (First Division)	South Group	Finnish FA (Suomen Pallolitto)	10th	Relegated
1997	Tier 3	Kakkonen (Second Division)	South Group	Finnish FA (Suomen Pallolitto)	11th	Relegated
1998	Tier 4	Kolmonen (Third Division)		Helsinki & Uusimaa (SPL Helsinki)		Promoted
1999	Tier 3	Kakkonen (Second Division)	South Group	Finnish FA (Suomen Pallolitto)	7th	
2000	Tier 3	Kakkonen (Second Division)	West Group	Finnish FA (Suomen Pallolitto)	10th	Relegated
2001	Tier 4	Kolmonen (Third Division)	Section 3	Helsinki & Uusimaa (SPL Helsinki)		
2002	Tier 4	Kolmonen (Third Division)	Section 3	Helsinki & Uusimaa (SPL Helsinki)	1st	Promoted
2003	Tier 3	Kakkonen (Second Division)	South Group	Finnish FA (Suomen Pallolitto)	8th	
2004	Tier 3	Kakkonen (Second Division)	South Group	Finnish FA (Suomen Pallolitto)	8th	
2005	Tier 3	Kakkonen (Second Division)	South Group	Finnish FA (Suomen Pallolitto)	4th	
2006	Tier 3	Kakkonen (Second Division)	Group A	Finnish FA (Suomen Pallolitto)	9th	
2007	Tier 3	Kakkonen (Second Division)	Group A	Finnish FA (Suomen Pallolitto)	8th	
2008	Tier 3	Kakkonen (Second Division)	Group A	Finnish FA (Suomen Pallolitto)	13th	Relegated
2009	Tier 4	Kolmonen (Third Division)	Section 2	Helsinki & Uusimaa (SPL Helsinki)	8th	
2010	Tier 4	Kolmonen (Third Division)	Section 3	Helsinki & Uusimaa (SPL Uusimaa)	9th	
2011	Tier 4	Kolmonen (Third Division)	Section 2	Helsinki & Uusimaa (SPL Uusimaa)	5th	
2012	Tier 4	Kolmonen (Third Division)	Section 3	Helsinki & Uusimaa (SPL Helsinki)	5th	
2013	Tier 4	Kolmonen (Third Division)	Section 2	Helsinki & Uusimaa (SPL Uusimaa)	4th	
2014	Tier 4	Kolmonen (Third Division)	Section 1	Helsinki & Uusimaa (SPL Uusimaa)	10th	
2015	Tier 4	Kolmonen (Third Division)	Groub 3	Helsinki & Uusimaa (SPL Uusimaa)	2nd	Promoted
2016	Tier 3	Kakkonen (Second Division)	Group B	Finnish FA (Suomen Pallolitto)	12th	Relegated
2017	Tier 4	Kolmonen (Third Division)	Group 3	Helsinki & Uusimaa (SPL Uusimaa)	4th	
2018	Tier 4	Kolmonen (Third Division)	Group 2	Helsinki & Uusimaa (SPL Uusimaa)	7th	
2019	Tier 4	Kolmonen (Third Division)	Group 3	Helsinki & Uusimaa (SPL Helsinki)	2nd	

- 10 seasons in Ykkönen
- 13 seasons in Kakkonen
- 21 seasons in Kolmonen
- 5 seasons in Nelonen

== Club Structure ==
FC Kontu Itä-Helsinki run a large number of teams including 5 men's teams, 2 ladies teams, 1 veteran's team, 10 boys teams and 5 girls teams.

== 2010 season ==
FC Kontu Men's Team are competing in Section 3 (Lohko 3) of the Kolmonen (Third Division) administered by the Uusimaa SPL. This is the fourth highest tier in the Finnish football system. In 2009 FC Kontu finished in 8th place in Section 2 (Lohko 2) of the Kolmonen.

FC Kontu / 2 are competing in Section 2 (Lohko 2) of the Nelonen (Fourth Division) administered by the Helsinki SPL.

FC Kontu / 4 are competing in Section 2 (Lohko 2) of the Kutonen (Sixth Division) administered by the Helsinki SPL.

FC Kontu / HSP are competing in Section 2 (Lohko 2) of the Seiska (Seventh Division) administered by the Helsinki SPL.

FC Kontu / 3 are competing in Section 3 (Lohko 3) of the Seiska (Seventh Division) administered by the Helsinki SPL.

== References and Sources ==
- Official Website
- Finnish Wikipedia
- Suomen Cup
- FC Kontu Facebook
