= Mellunkylä =

Neighbourhood of Helsinki, Finland

Coordinates: 60°14′N 25°06′E

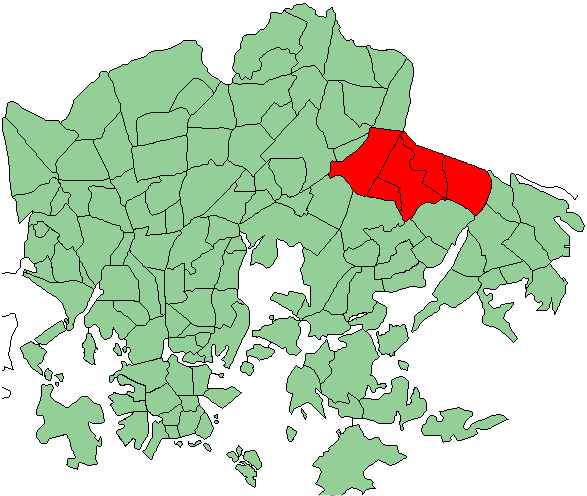
Districts of Helsinki. Mellunkylä highlighted

Mellunkylä (Swedish: Mellungsby) is a neighbourhood in East Helsinki, Finland. The area of Mellunkylä is 9,9 km^{2} and it has population of 36,360 (2005).

There are five suburbs in Mellunkylä:

- Kontula (Gårdsbacka)
- Vesala (Ärvings)
- Mellunmäki (Mellungsbacka)
- Kivikko (Stensböle)
- Kurkimäki (Tranbacka)

Mellunkylä had some suburban settlements already before World War II. In the 1960s, Kontula, the largest suburb in Finland, was built in record time.
