= Kurkimäki =

Coordinates: 60°14′N 25°04′E

Kurkimäki (in Finnish) Tranbacka (in Swedish)
- Neighborhood of Helsinki
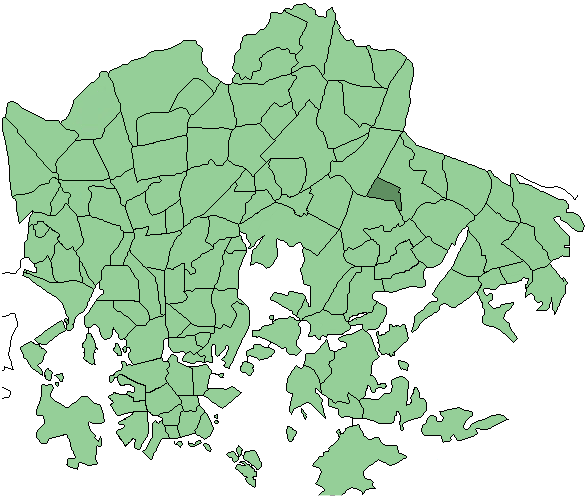
- Location in Helsinki
- Country: Finland
- Province: Southern Finland
- Region: Uusimaa
- Sub-region: Helsinki
- Time zone: UTC+2 (EET)
  - Summer (DST): UTC+3 (EEST)

Kurkimäki (Finnish), Tranbacka (Swedish) is an eastern neighborhood of Helsinki, Finland. It is part of the Mellunkylä area.

== Politics ==
Results of the 2011 Finnish parliamentary election in Kurkimäki:

- Social Democratic Party 26.4%
- True Finns 22.7%
- Left Alliance 13.5%
- National Coalition Party 13.5%
- Green League 10.9%
- Centre Party 3.8%
- Christian Democrats 2.3%
- Swedish People's Party 2.2%
