= Vesala =

Vesala (in Finnish) Ärvings (in Swedish)
- Neighborhood of Helsinki
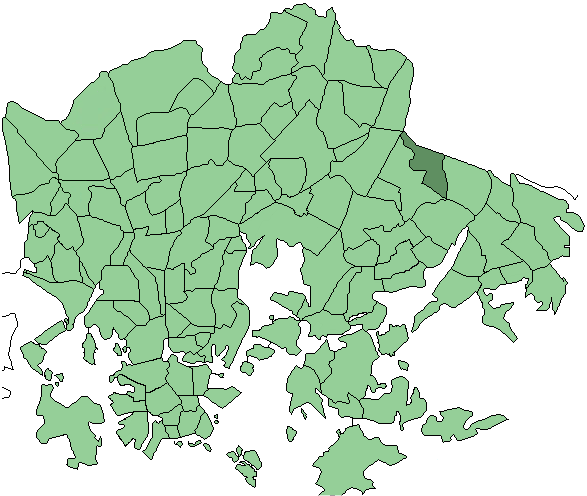
- Location in Helsinki
- Coordinates: 60.24086°N 25.10289°E
- Country: Finland
- Province: Southern Finland
- Region: Uusimaa
- Sub-region: Helsinki
- Time zone: UTC+2 (EET)
  - Summer (DST): UTC+3 (EEST)

Vesala (Swedish: Ärvings) is a neighborhood in eastern Helsinki, Finland. It is a part of the Mellunkylä district. The residential housing in the area consists mostly of single-family houses built in the 1950s and 1960s and apartment buildings built in the 1980s.

== Gallery ==
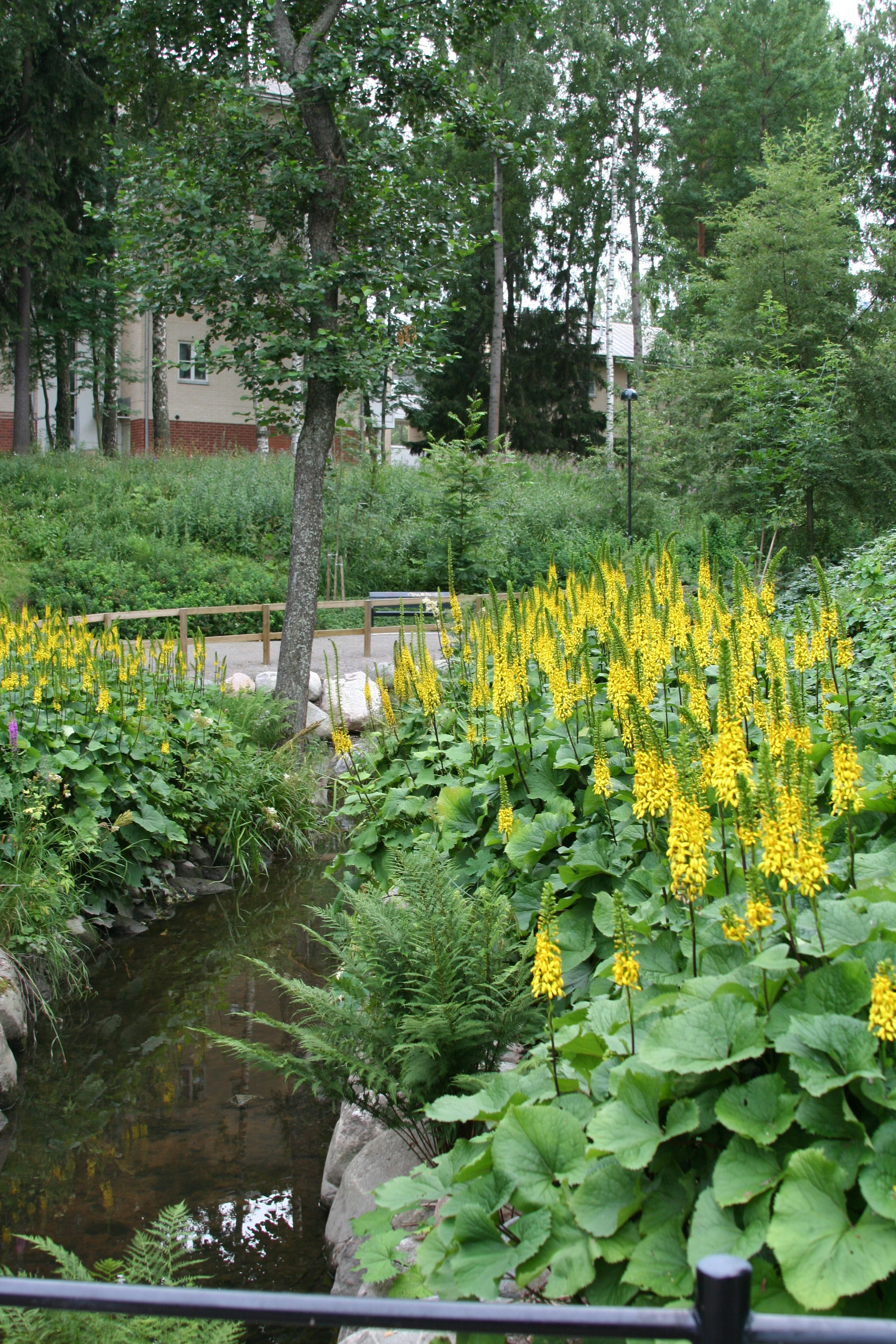
Park Aarrepuisto

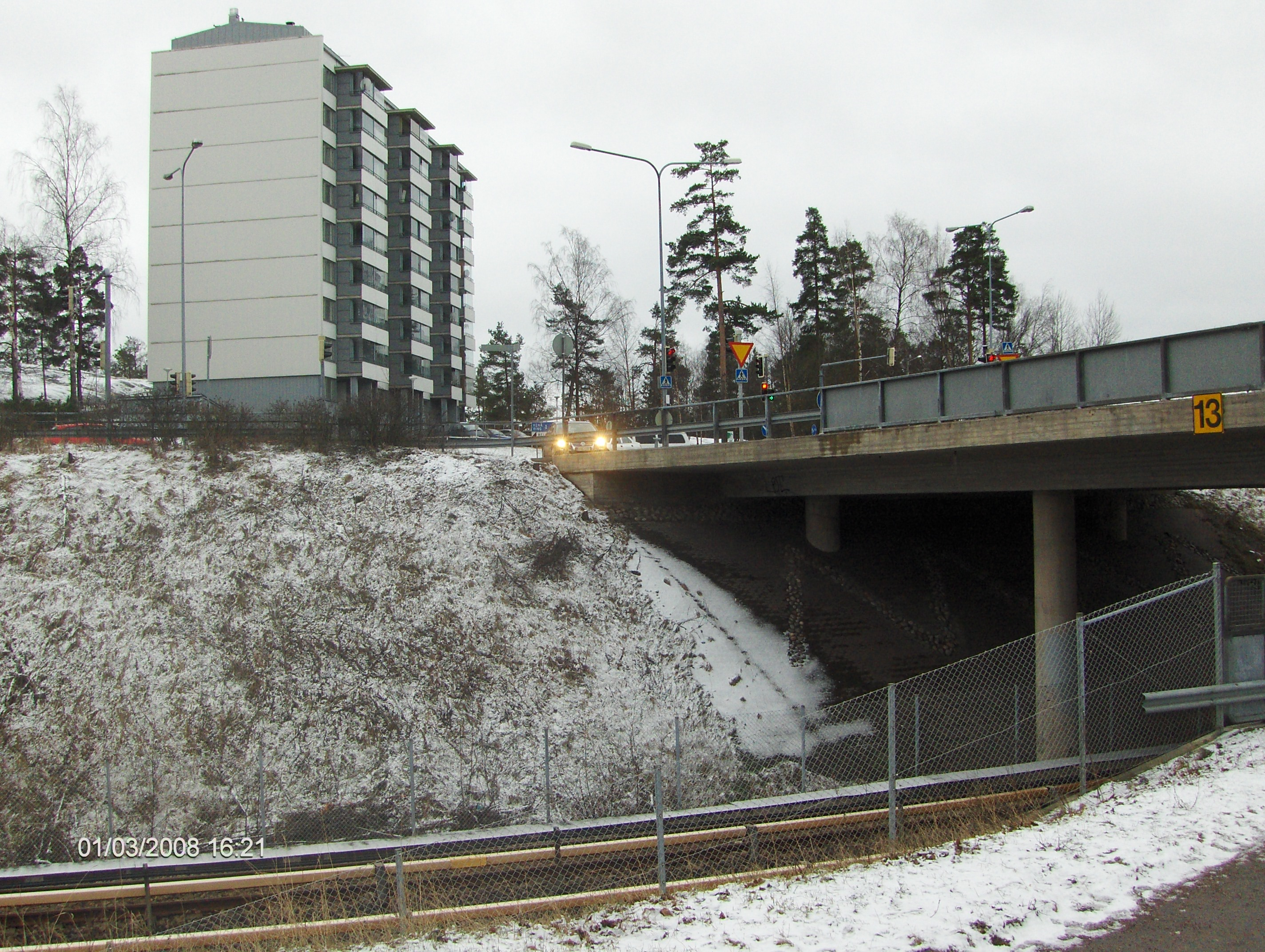
The Kotikonnuntie bridge

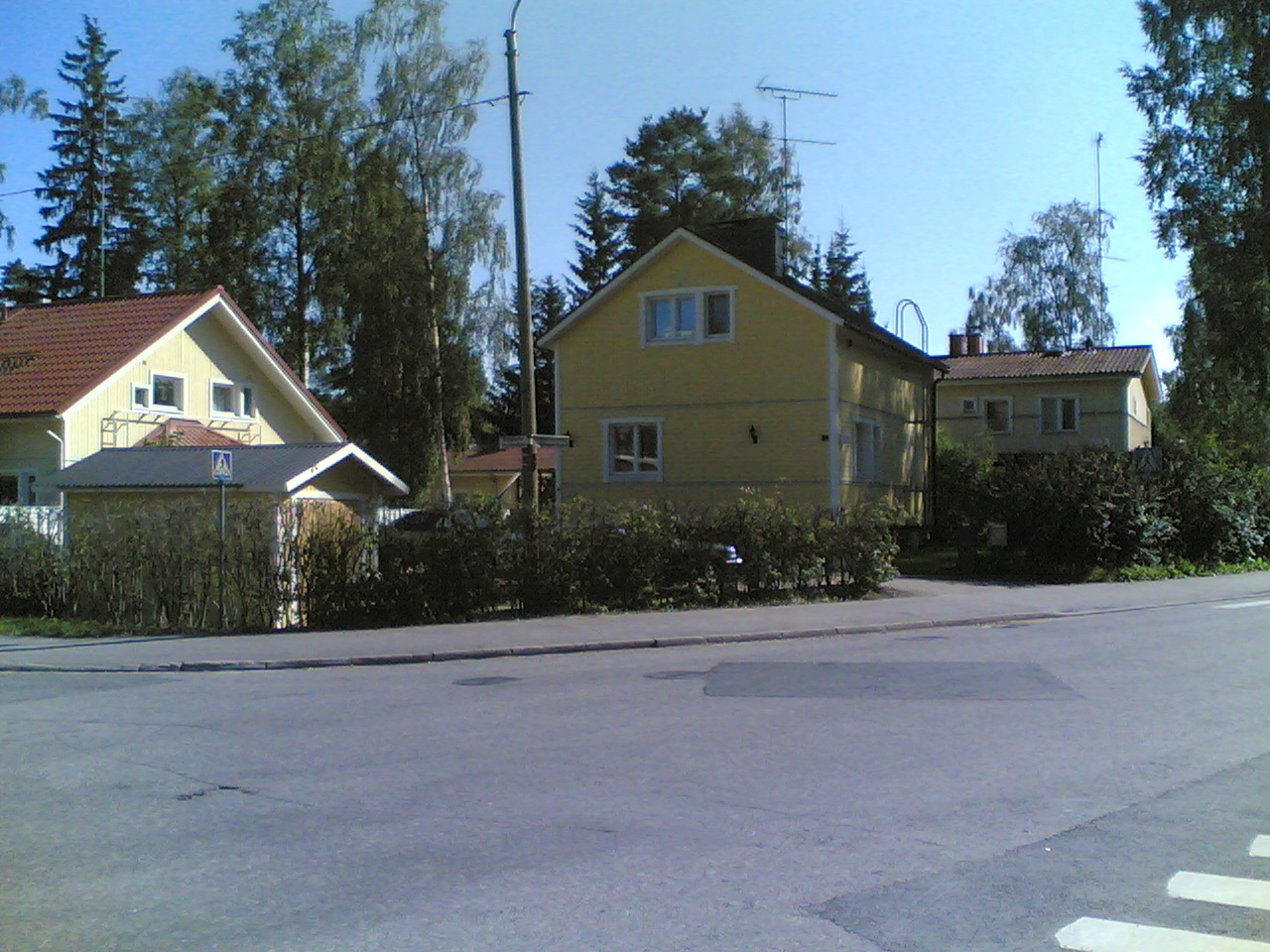
Single-family houses in the neighborhood.
