= Myllypuro =

Myllypuro (in Finnish) Kvarnbäcken (in Swedish)
- Neighborhood of Helsinki
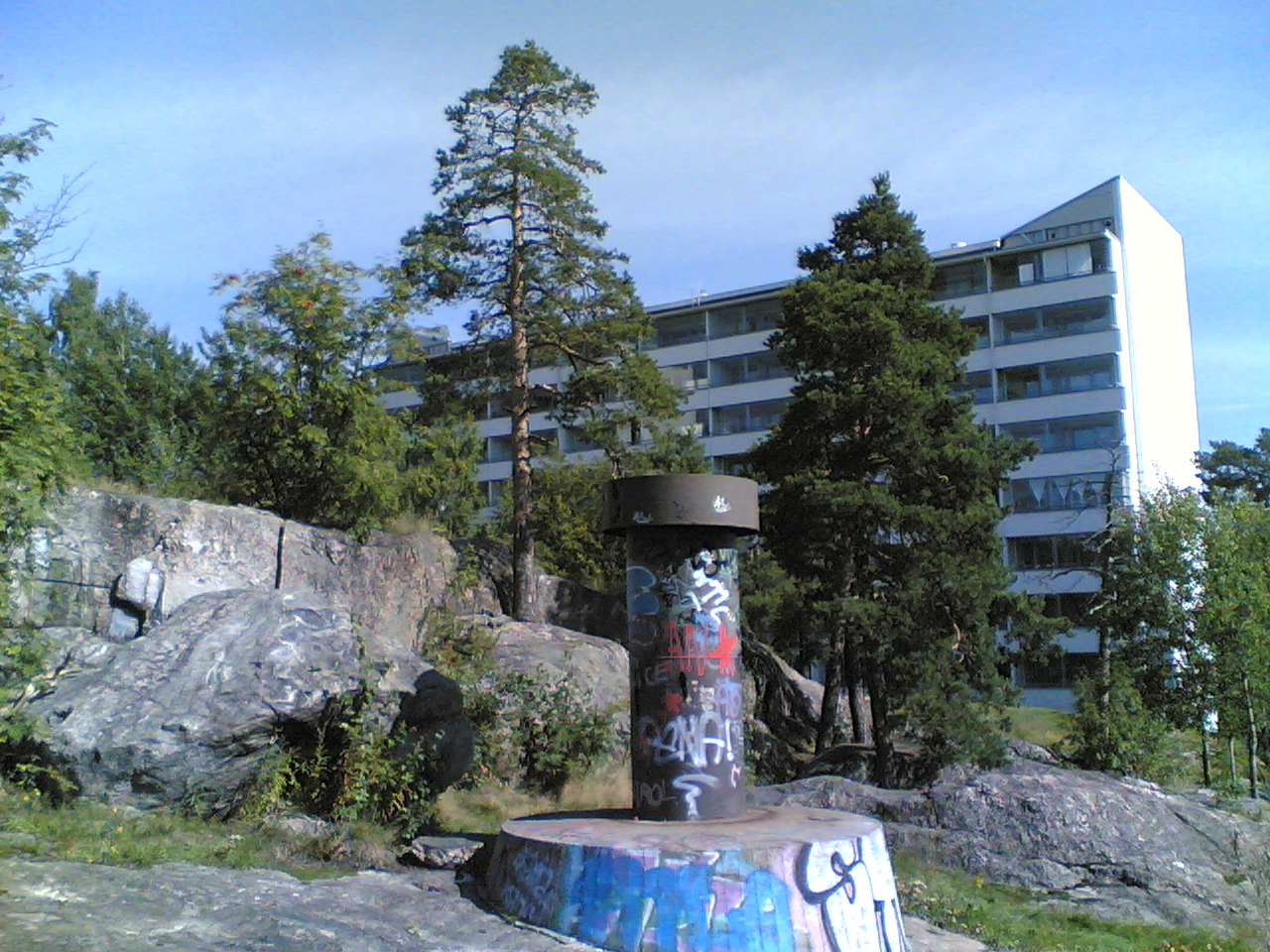

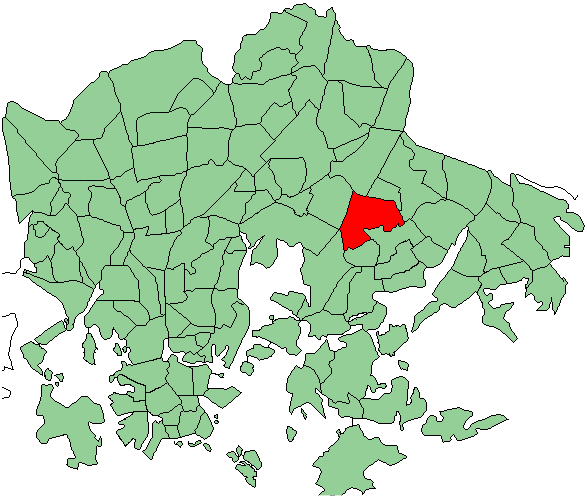
- Location in Helsinki
- Coordinates: 60°13′30″N 25°4′0″E
- Country: Finland
- Province: Southern Finland
- Region: Uusimaa
- Sub-region: Helsinki
- Time zone: UTC+2 (EET)
  - Summer (DST): UTC+3 (EEST)

Myllypuro (Finnish), Kvarnbäcken (Swedish) is an East Helsinki's neighborhood of Helsinki, Finland. It is a part of the Vartiokylä district. The suburban housing estate, consisting mainly of apartment buildings, was constructed mostly in the 1960s. There have also been new housing developments afterwards.
