= East Helsinki =

Eastern urban area of Helsinki, Finland

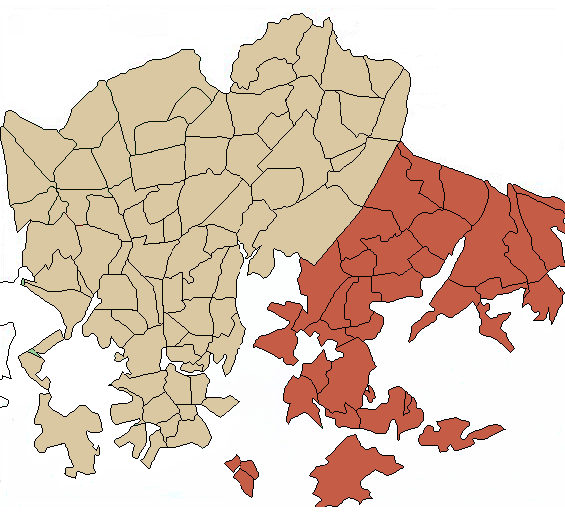
Helsinki City areas as a whole. Areas of East Helsinki are marked in red.

East Helsinki (Finnish: Itä-Helsinki, Swedish: Östra Helsingfors) is an area in Helsinki, Finland, usually thought to comprise the city's eastern and south-eastern major districts (Finnish: suurpiiri, Swedish: stordistrikt), including the districts of Vartiokylä, Myllypuro, Mellunkylä, Vuosaari, Herttoniemi, Laajasalo and Kulosaari. With the exception of Kulosaari, the buildings in the area are relatively new – most have been built in the 1960s or later – and constitute relatively densely inhabited suburbs, except for the southern part of Laajasalo and most of Kulosaari. On the other side of the bridge to the west of Kulosaari is Helsinki Downtown (Finnish: Helsingin kantakaupunki, Swedish: Helsingfors innerstad), the so-called "South Helsinki". Officially, the name "East Helsinki" is not found in the city's regional nomenclature, but it was a name created by the locals of the area.

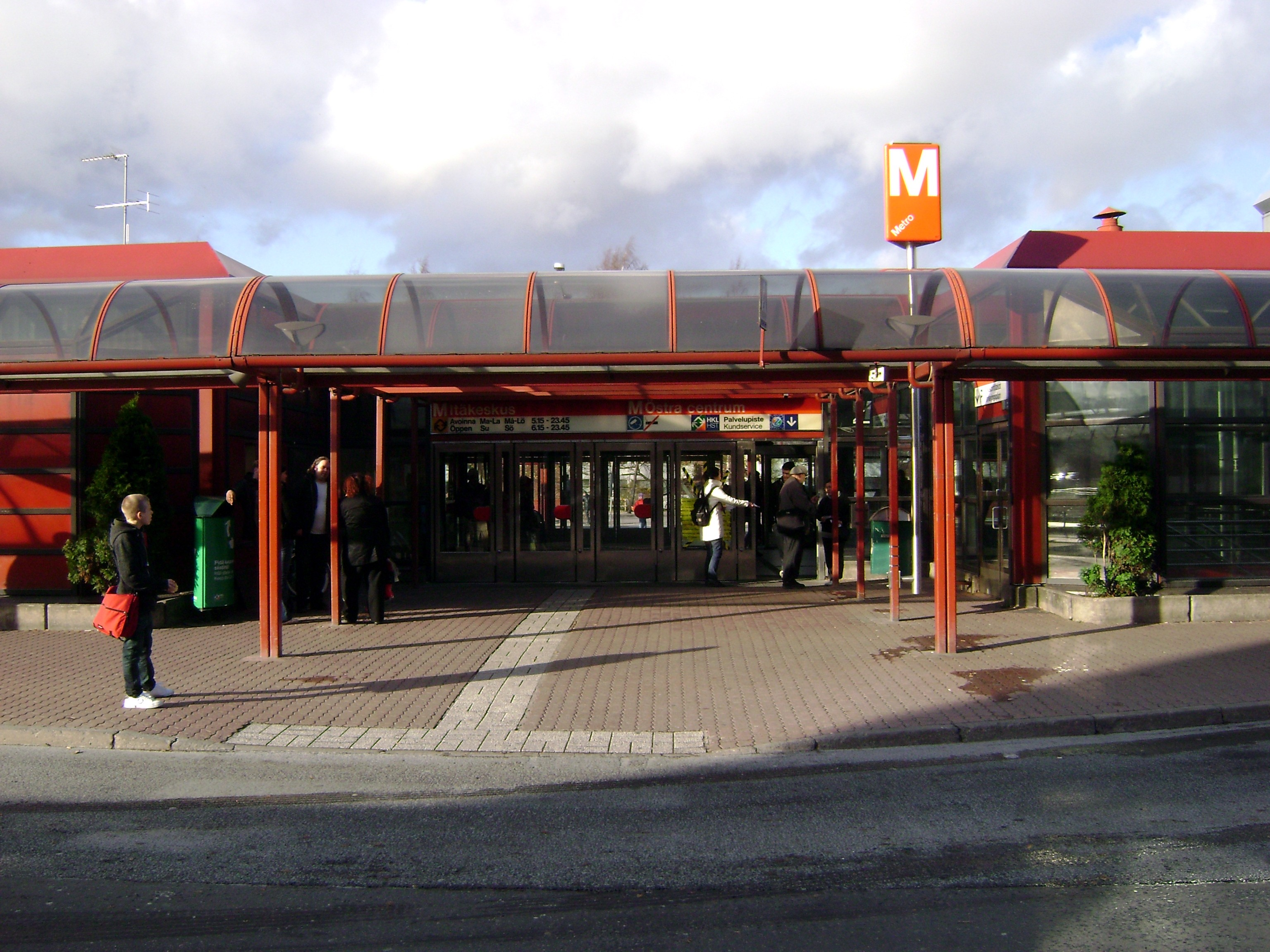
Entrance into Itäkeskus metro station. The Helsinki Metro forms the core of public transport in East Helsinki.

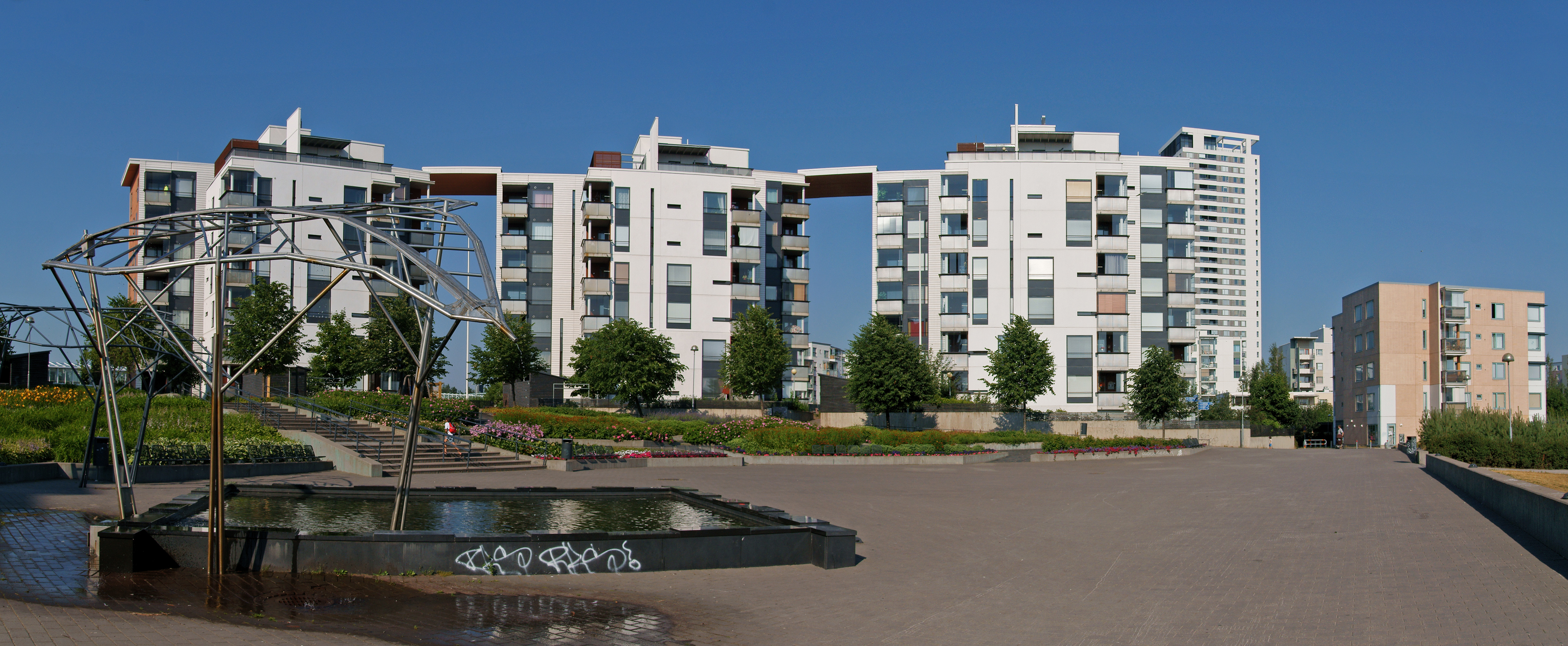
Residential buildings in Vuosaari, Helsinki.

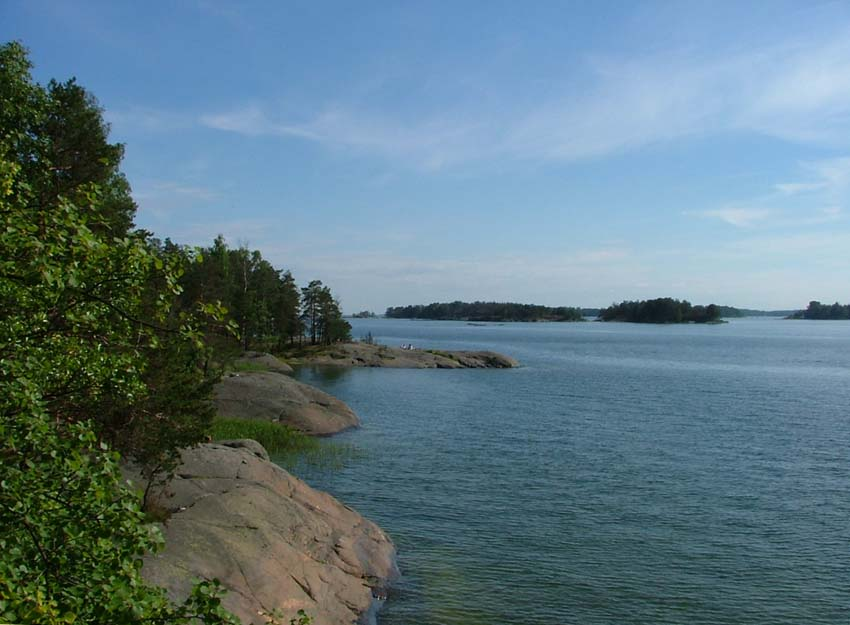
Uutela nature park in Vuosaari is one of the many public areas for outdoor recreation in East Helsinki.

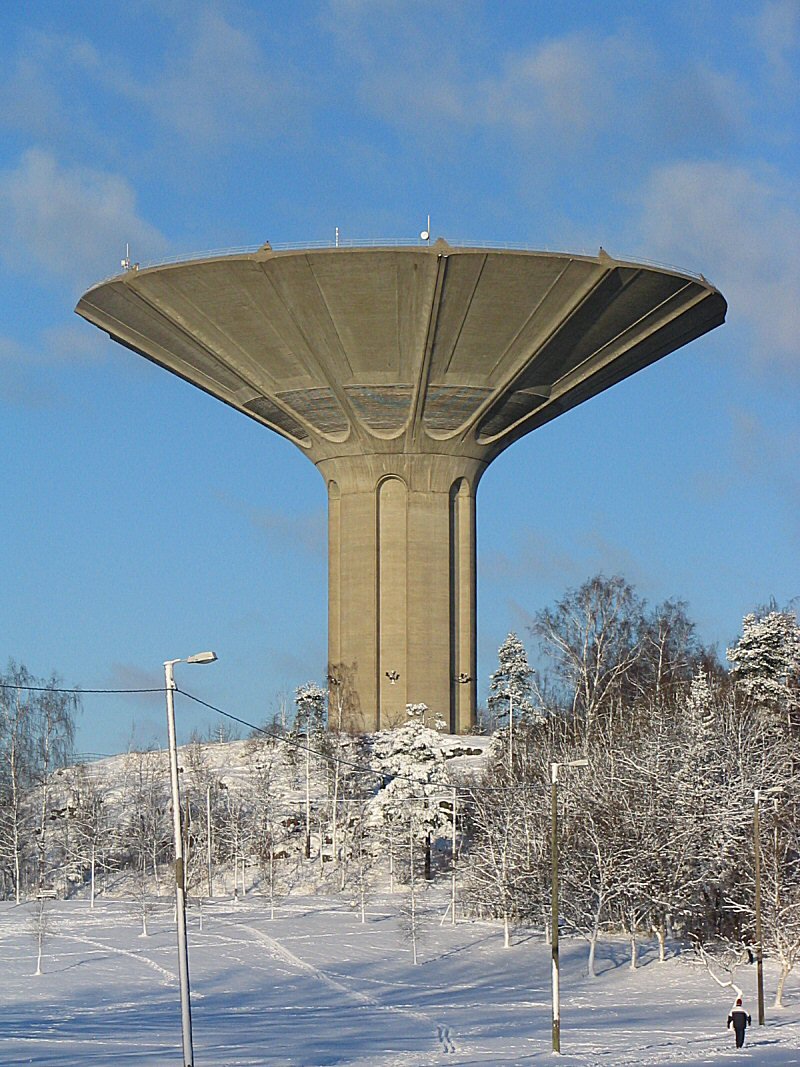
Roihuvuori water tower.

East Helsinki has had problems with unemployment and poverty, and immigrants and refugees are somewhat concentrated in the area's subsidised housing and city-owned apartments. Drug dealing is relatively common in East Helsinki. This has led to a popular conception of East Helsinki as a problem-ridden area. Kontula, quarter of the Mellunkylä district, has generally been considered one of the most notorious ghettos in particular.

Public transport in East Helsinki is organised mainly through the Helsinki Metro, most of whose stops are located in the area, and feeder bus lines. The most important road connection to the city central from East Helsinki with car or bus runs along Itäväylä ("Eastern Highway"). One of Finland's largest shopping centres, Itis, is located near Itäkeskus, the geographical centre of East Helsinki, and many public and commercial services for the area are concentrated there.

A major change took place in the area's infrastructure upon the completion of the Port of Vuosaari. Most of the existing port facilities in Helsinki were moved to the new seaport, which created increased economic activity in East Helsinki as well as released new areas for development in other parts of the city. As a logistics area, the Port of Vuosaari employs about 2,000 people, and through it, for example, bananas coming to Finland (about 5,000 containers a year), pass through the port to the main warehouses of the grocery stores.

== Demographics ==
As of 2022, the eastern and south-eastern major districts of Helsinki have a combined population of about 170,000, the two largest single districts being Mellunkylä with a population of 39,749 and Vuosaari with a population of 38,657. 10.2% of the major districts' population is of foreign origin, which is more than anywhere else in Helsinki. 84.9% of the population of East Helsinki speak Finnish as their native language. 5.4% speak Swedish, while 9.7% have another language as their mother tongue. The most common languages after Finnish and Swedish are Russian, Estonian, Somali and English. All that makes East Helsinki the most multicultural area of the capital region.

The eastern major district has an unemployment rate of about 12%, more than any other major district in Helsinki, while the south-eastern major district's rate was closer to average at about 9%. Approximately one out of every ten people in East Helsinki receives social welfare payments from the Finnish state. In Mellunkylä, where the situation is the most problematic, the figure is 14.9%. (For comparison, the figure for Lauttasaari in West Helsinki is only 3.8%.)

== Districts ==
District	Population	Area (km^{2})	Density (per km^{2})	Unempl. rate
Herttoniemi (Hertonäs)	26,333	6.79	3,873	10.8%
Kulosaari (Brändö)	3,791	2.47	1,535	5.7%
Laajasalo (Degerö)	16,486	16.55	995	7.8%
Mellunkylä (Mellungsby)	36,360	9.9	3,673	13.6%
Myllypuro (Kvarnbäcken)	9,189	2.19	4,196	14.3%
Vartiokylä (Botby)	21,214	7.84	2,662	10.9%
Vuosaari (Nordsjö)	31,948	15.38	2,077	11.7%

== East Helsinki in popular culture ==
Many Finnish hip hop artists such as Iso H, Steen1 and Asa, come from East Helsinki. Some of them, especially Asa, employ very political themes in their music, focusing on the problems of the Finnish capital's eastern suburbs.

The Roihuvuori water tower, built in the 1970s, which is visible from most parts of East Helsinki, has become somewhat of a symbol for the area. It is used as a common device in Finnish films and TV series to signify that the events are set in East Helsinki.

== Sports ==
East Helsinki is home to a number of sports clubs. In association football, the most renowned clubs are FC Kontu from Kontula and FC Viikingit from Vuosaari. Kontu is known for its remarkable run between 1981 and 1986 when, under the management of Antti Muurinen, the club climbed from the 5th tier of Finnish football to the qualifying playoff for the Mestaruussarja in just six seasons. Viikingit became the first club from East Helsinki to play in the men's premiership when they competed in the 2007 season of Veikkausliiga. In women's football Puotinkylän Valtti is a two-time Finnish champion, Kontu won one championship, and Herttoniemen Toverit won the women's cup twice. Laajasalon Palloseura is a neighbourhood club representing Laajasalo. They organize youth football for boys and girls and also have first teams for men and women.

Other sports clubs include Pesäpallo, women's league team Roihu from Roihuvuori, and the oldest Finnish American football club and six-time Finnish champion, the East City Giants, founded in 1979. Rugby Union clubs Warriors RC and Helsinki RUFC play in Myllypuro sports park.

In Myllypuro sports park are baseball and rugby grounds as well as indoor grounds for football, futsal, basketball, and floorball.

== See also ==
- Subdivisions of Helsinki
- Östersundom
