= Puustellinmetsä mass grave =

Coordinates: 60°16′29″N 25°0′55″E

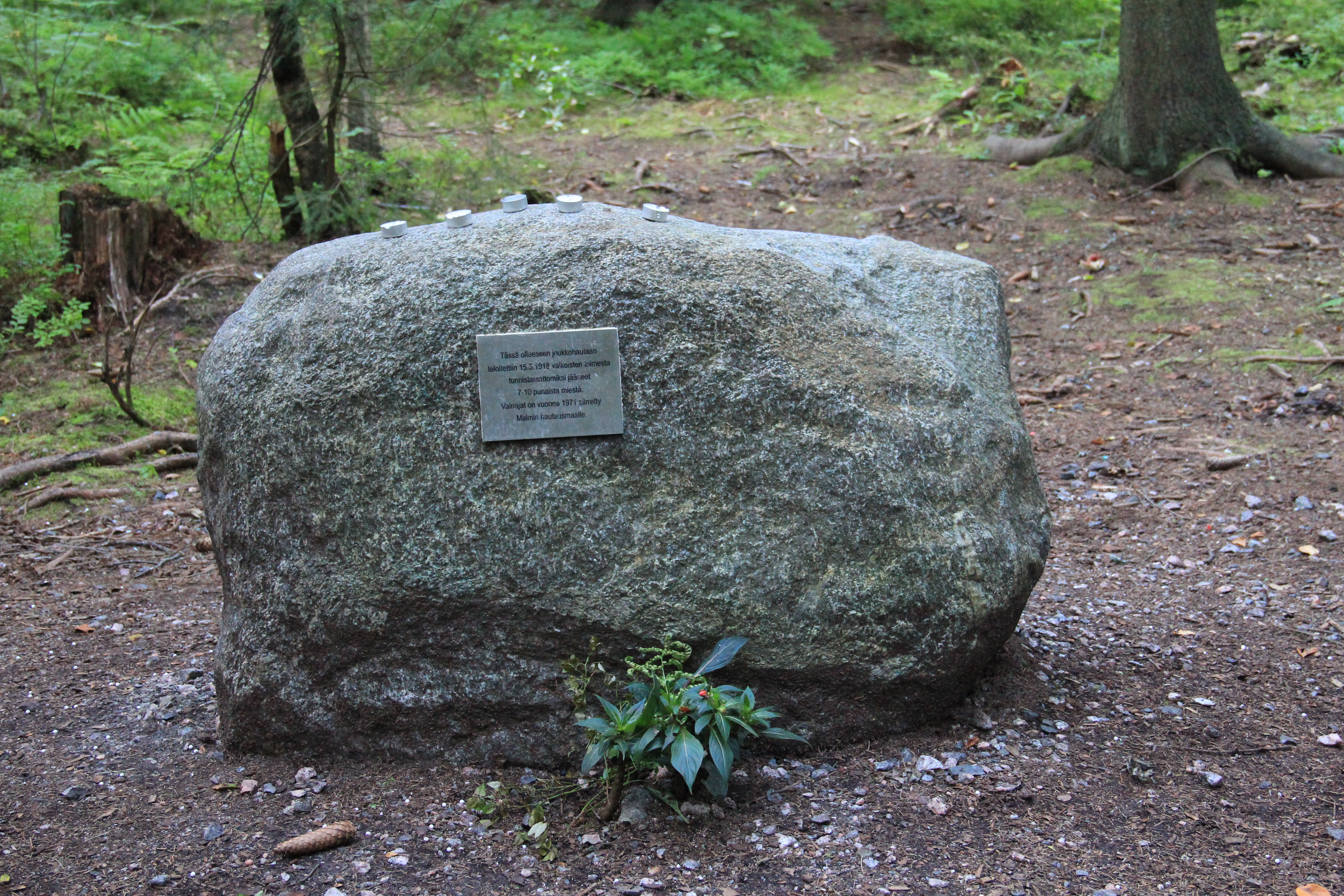
Memorial stone in Puustellinmetsä Wood in Suutarila.

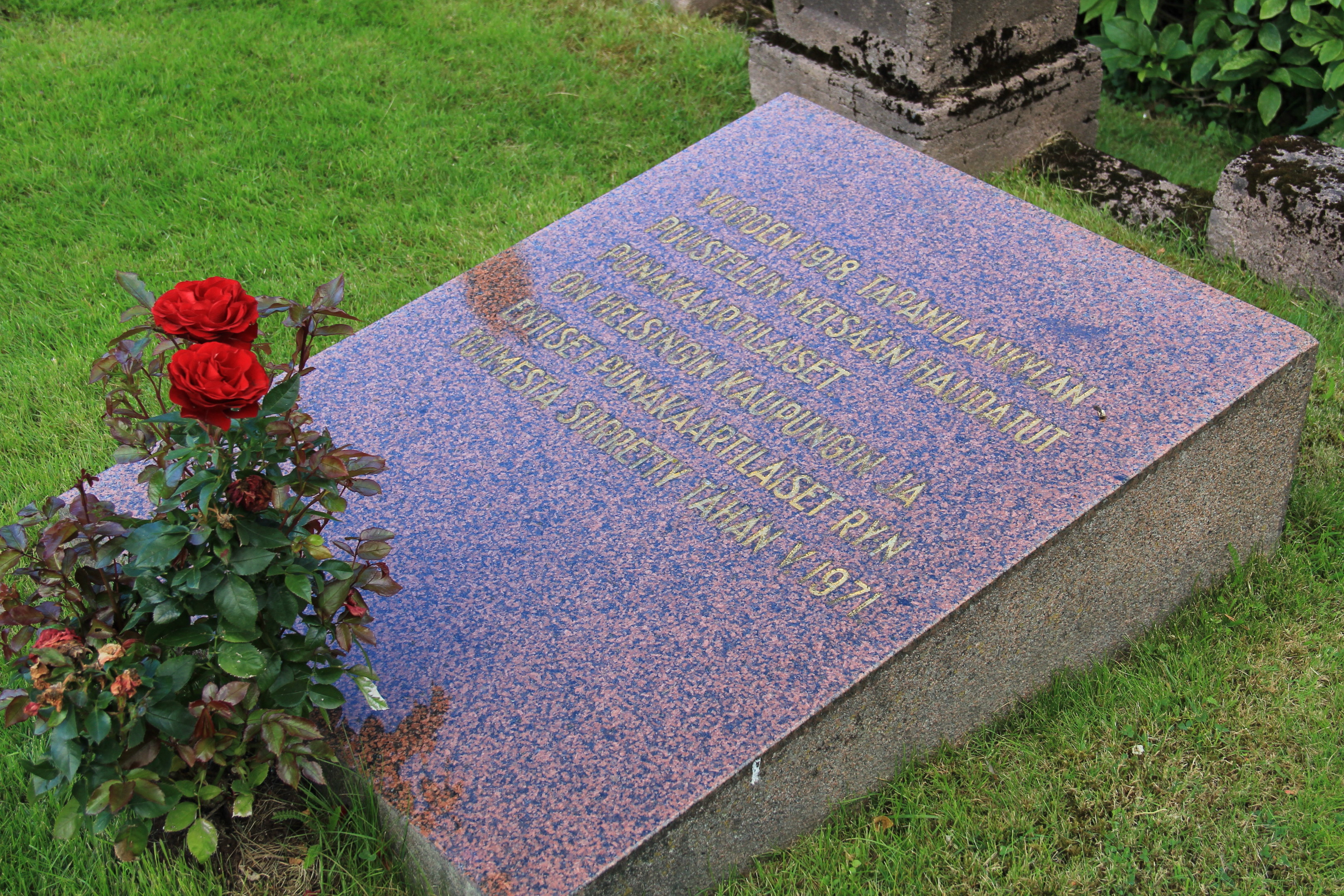
Tombstone of those executed at their new grave in the Malmi Cemetery.

The Puustellinmetsä mass grave was a mass grave that was located in Puustellinmetsä, Suutarila, Helsinki, Finland. It was created during the Finnish Civil War in 1918. The remains of the bodies in the grave were transferred to the Malmi Cemetery in 1971.

== History ==
On the final day of the Finnish Civil War, on 15 May 1918, there was a shooting incident in Tapanila, in which a White Guard man named Karl Lindström was killed. Who shot him or what the exact circumstances were, was never found out. Also the chain of events during the reprisals is unclear, but it seems likely that members of the White Guard in Malmi apprehended numerous members of the Red Guards, who were taken to the Malmi Police Station for interrogation. At least some of the apprehensions were conducted in a random way, by apprehending men at the Tapanila Station who were going to travel to work by train in the morning. The following night, on 17 May 1918, some of those apprehended were put on a march to the Puustellinmetsä Wood, where they were shot and then buried in a mass grave. The identities of those shot are not known with certainty.

After World War II, local working-class organizations arranged an annual memorial march from the Tapanila square to the site of the mass grave. It seems that this tradition came to an end in 1971 at the latest, when the remains of the bodies were transferred to the Malmi Cemetery. At that time, “seven complete skeletons and some separate bones where found in the grave”.

A memorial was erected on the site of the mass grave in October 2012. A steel plaque about the events was stolen in 2014, but it was found later.

== See also ==
- Haaga executions of 1918
- Pohjois-Haaga mass grave
