= Jakomäki =

Quarter in Suurmetsä, Helsinki, Finland

Coordinates: 60°15′40″N 25°4′40″E

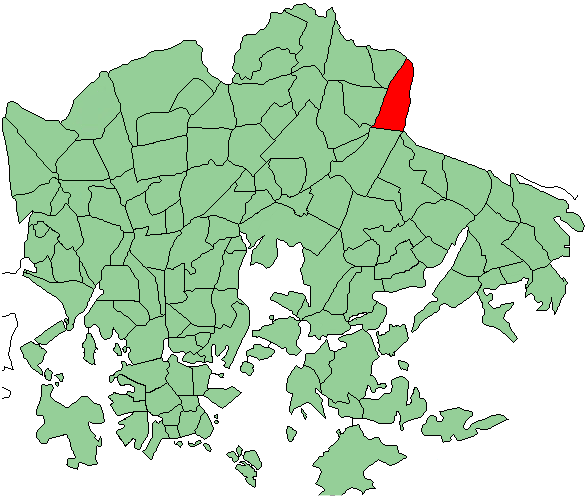
Districts of Helsinki. Jakomäki highlighted

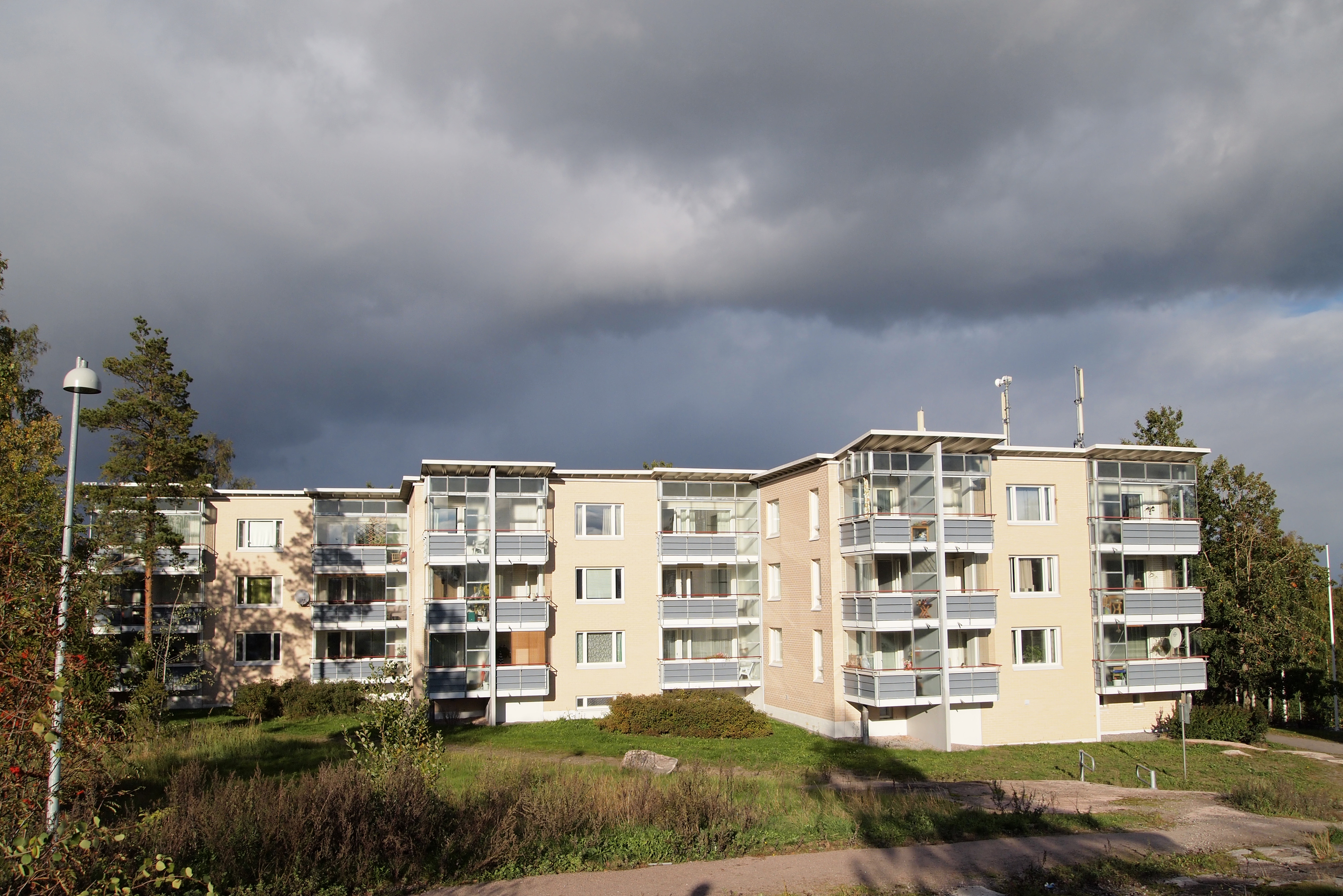
Apartment buildings in Jakomäki

Jakomäki (Finnish: [ˈjɑkoˌmæki]; Swedish: Jakobacka) is a quarter, part of Suurmetsä neighbourhood in Helsinki, Finland. It has an area of 1.92 km^{2} and a population of 5,481 (2005).

The suburb was built within a few years in the 1960s, and it contained only council houses. In the 1970s, blocks of flats were built in northern area of Jakomäki. Jakomäki is located near the border with Vantaa. It is bordered by Kivikko, Heikinlaakso and Tattarisuo. Apartments that are located on the highest points of Jakomäki do not have more than three floors because of low-flying general aviation aircraft that take off from or land at Helsinki-Malmi airport located nearby.

Jakomäki has been known for years as one of the notorious suburbs in the city. The number of unemployed in the district is also one of the highest in Helsinki and one of the lowest in terms of the number of high-educated people.

== Politics ==
Results of the 2011 Finnish parliamentary election in Jakomäki:

- True Finns 31.9%
- Social Democratic Party 27.6%
- Left Alliance 11.4%
- National Coalition Party 9.3%
- Green League 6.8%
- Centre Party 3.9%
- Christian Democrats 3.7%
- Swedish People's Party 1.5%

== See also ==
- Alppikylä
- Kontula, Helsinki
