= Alppikylä =

Alppikylä (in Finnish) Alpbyn (in Swedish)
- Neighborhood of Helsinki
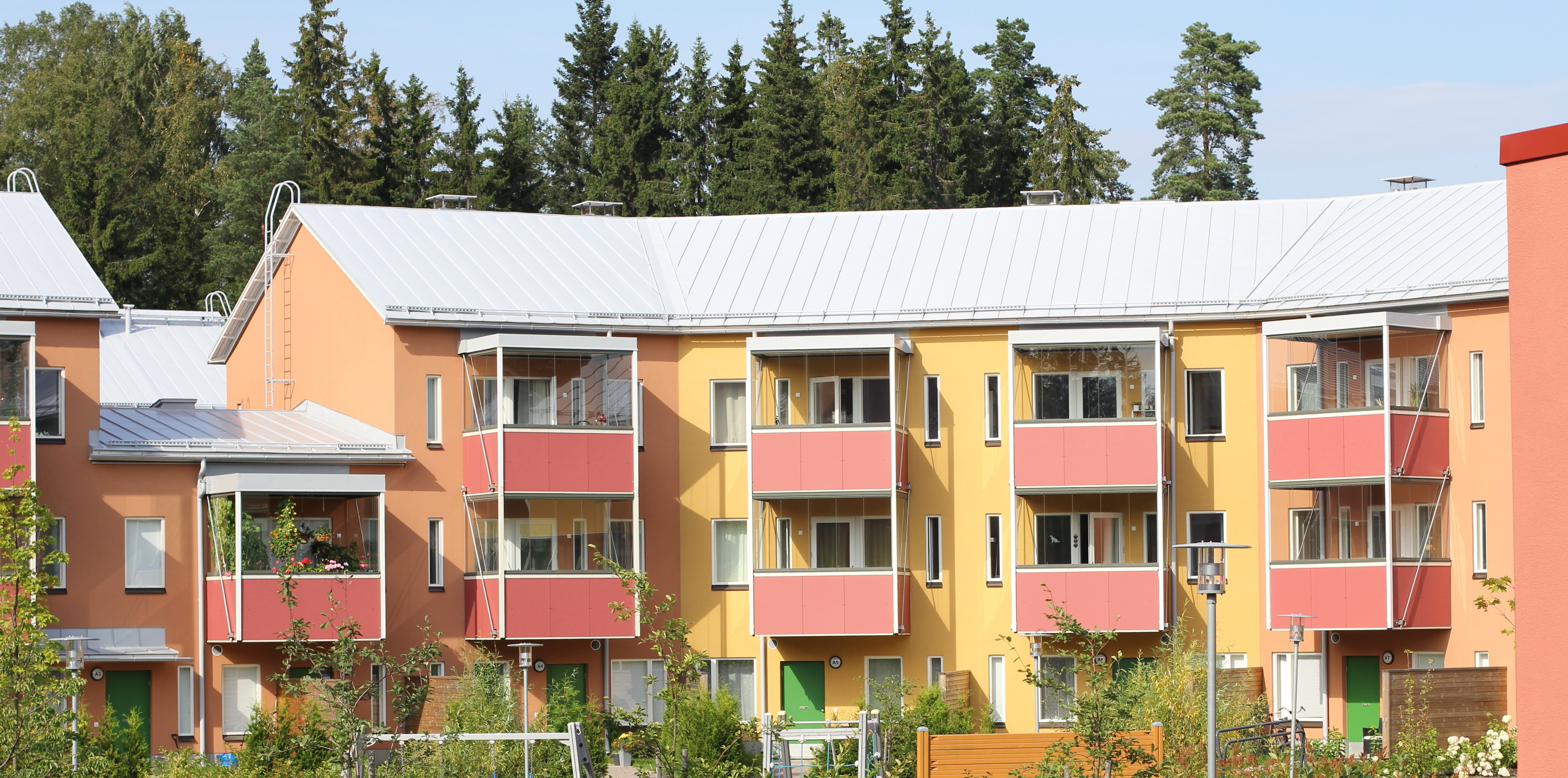
- Residential buildings in Alppikylä
- Interactive map of Alppikylä (in Finnish); Alpbyn (in Swedish)
- Coordinates: 60.25904°N 25.06886°E
- Country: Finland
- Province: Southern Finland
- Region: Uusimaa
- Sub-region: Helsinki
- Time zone: UTC+2 (EET)
  - Summer (DST): UTC+3 (EEST)

Alppikylä (Finnish: [ˈɑlpːiˌkylæ]; Swedish: Alpbyn; lit. 'Alpine village') is a neighborhood in the northeastern part of Helsinki, Finland. It is located between the Tattarisuo neighborhood and the Helsinki–Lahti Highway (E75), near the Helsinki–Malmi Airport. It is classified as belonging to the Suurmetsä district. At the beginning of 2017, the area had a population of 1,478.

== History ==
The former building stock of Alppikylä is wooden houses with large gardens. The area got its name when the undulating terrain merged with the Alps in people's minds. The old road north of Helsinki curved past the high cliff of Jakomäki, which is also called Alppikallio (lit. 'Alpine rock'). At its foot was a village that came to be called Alppikylä.

In the 19th century, a bus passed from Alppikallio from Helsinki to Vantaa's Hakkila, where the route merged with the King's Road from Turku to Vyborg. There is a rocky milestone along the Alppikyläntie from the old thoroughfare. The milestone and the four pines nearby are protected by a town plan. According to the readings on the milestone, the distance to Helsinki was 14 kilometres (8.7 mi) and to Vyborg 275 kilometres (171 mi).

== Buildings and services ==
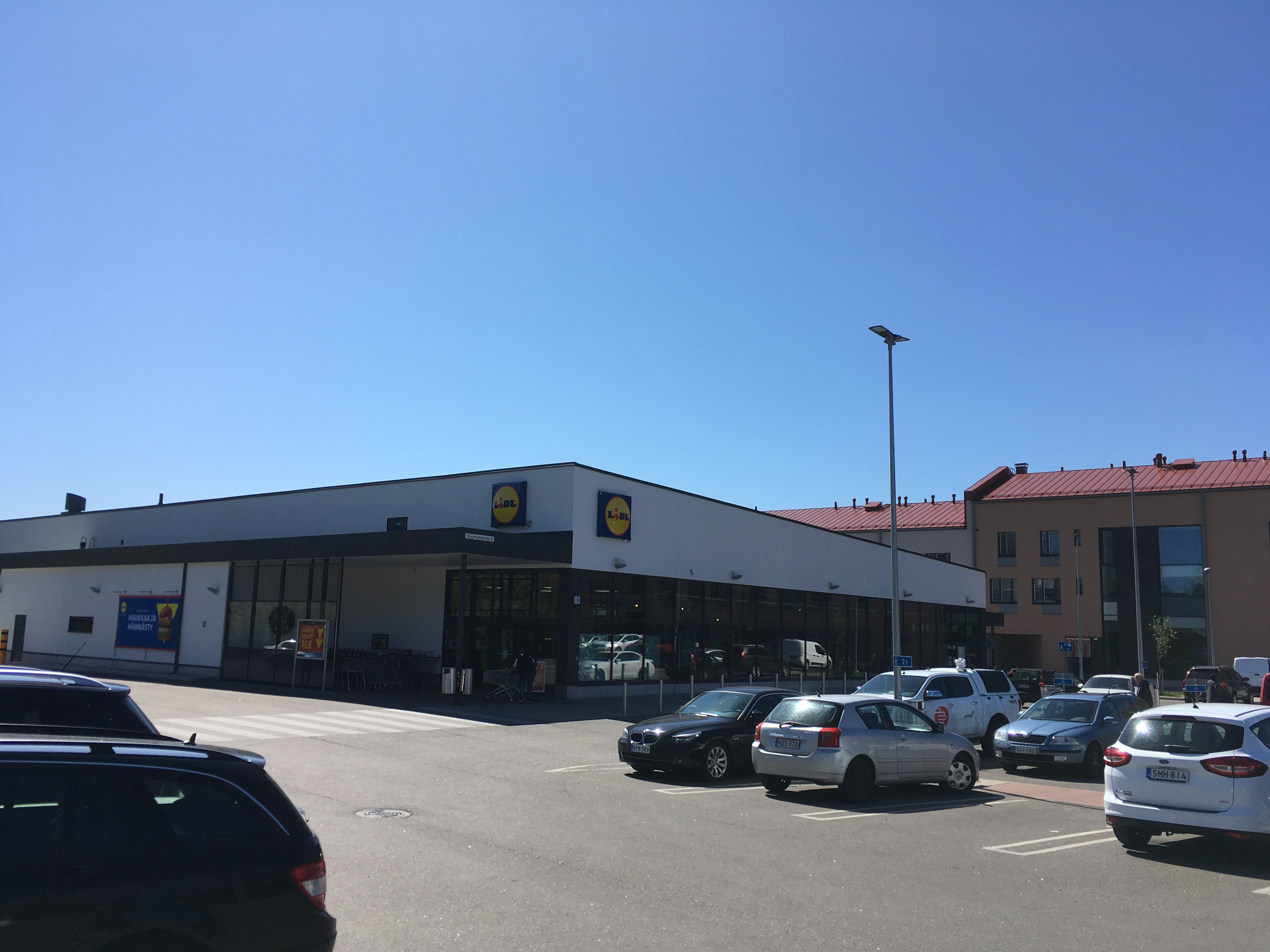
Lidl grocery store in Alppikylä

Alppikylä is well-known for its colorful townhouses. Most of the current buildings were built in a construction project in 2011–2016, where apartment buildings and densely populated townhouses will be built in Alppikylä.

The services of the residential area include a kindergarten, which was opened in a building completed in early August 2016 on the Alppikylä Street, and a Lidl grocery store.

== See also ==
- Jakomäki
