= Malmi Cemetery =

Cemetery in Helsinki, Finland

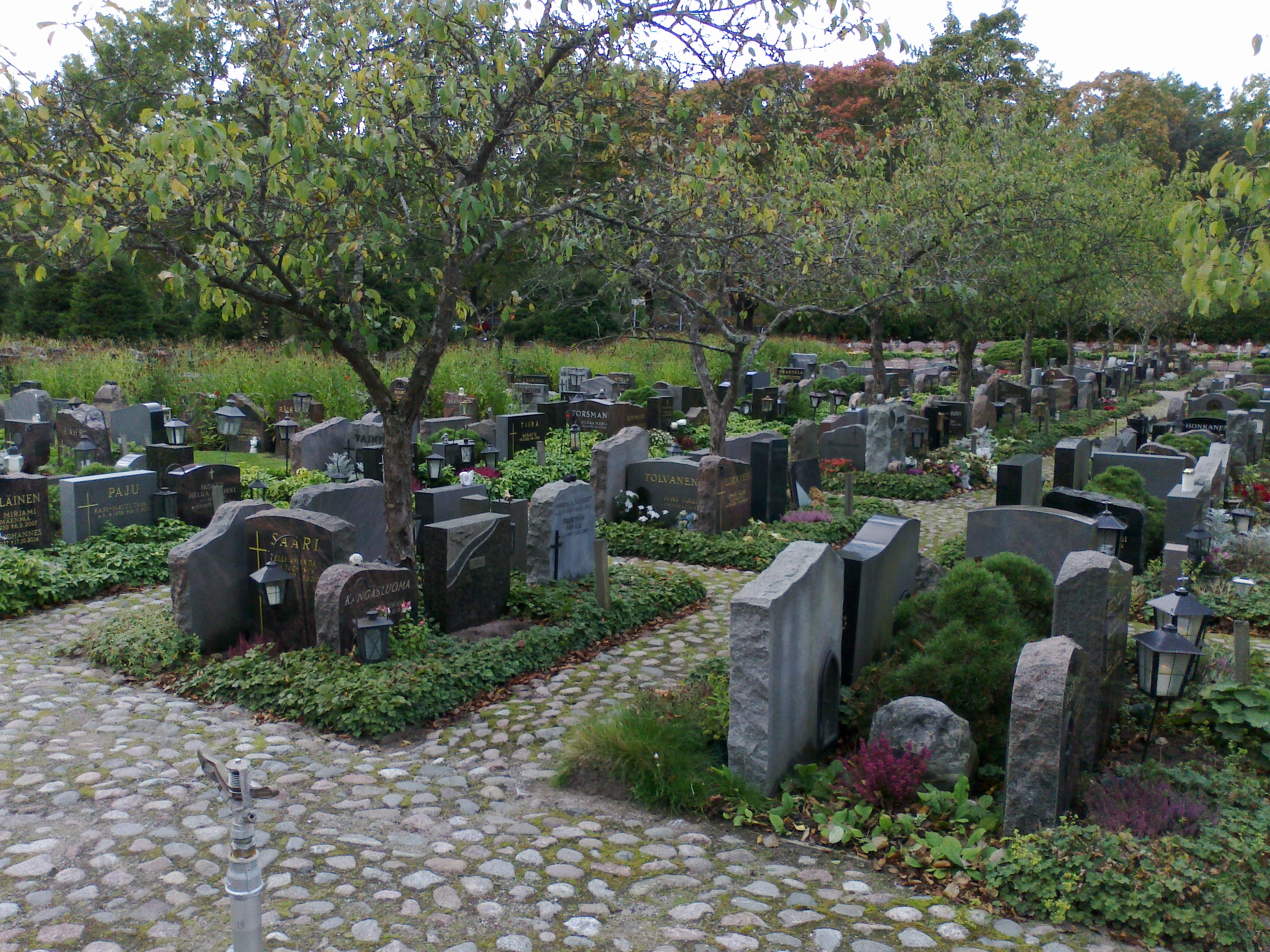
- Graves at the Malmi Cemetery
- Interactive map of Malmi Cemetery

Details
- Established: 1894
- Location: Malmi, Helsinki
- Country: Finland
- Coordinates: 60°14′10.05″N 025°01′38.22″E
- Type: Public
- Size: c. 65 ha
- No. of graves: c. 200 000
- Website: Malmin hautausmaa – Helsingin seurakunnat
- Find a Grave: Malmi Cemetery

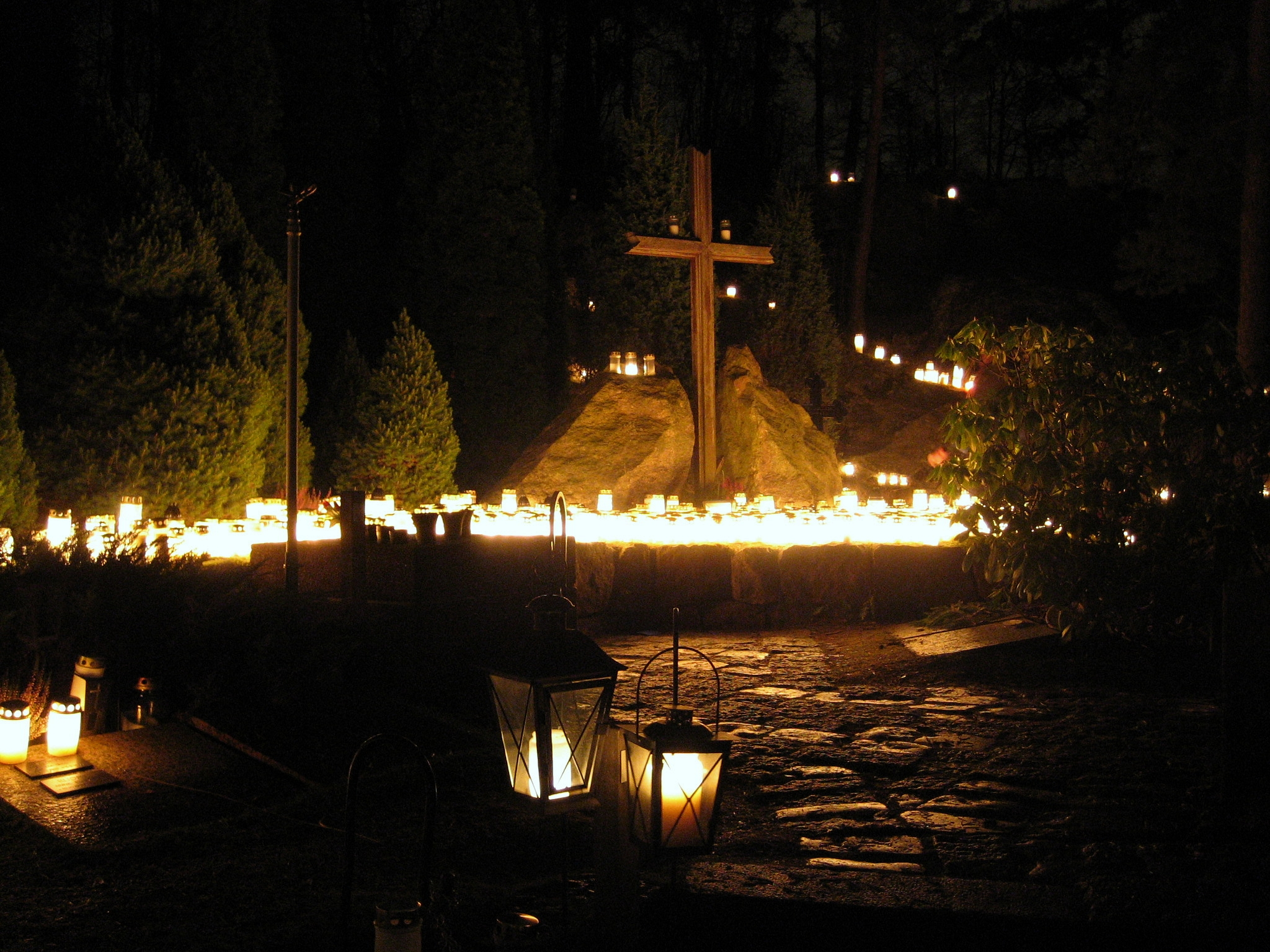
Cross surrounded by hundreds of candles at the Malmi Cemetery on Christmas Eve

The Malmi Cemetery (Finnish: Malmin hautausmaa; Swedish: Malms begravningsplats) is a large cemetery located at the corner between Ring I and the Lahti Highway (E75) in the Malmi district in Helsinki, Finland. It is the largest cemetery in Finland in terms of both area and number of burials. It was a former training camp site for soldiers under the administration of the Finnish Crown. In the early 20th century, Malmi Cemetery even had its own train connection and water tower.

Many well-known Finns also rest in the Malmi Cemetery, e.g. actors Tauno Palo, Matti Pellonpää and Ansa Ikonen, singers Alexi Laiho (former singer and guitarist of the melodic death metal band Children of Bodom), Petri Gerdt (Perpetrator of the Myyrmanni bombing), Olavi Virta, Tapio Rautavaara and Laila Kinnunen, designer Birger Kaipiainen, and one of the Winter War heroes, Captain Aarne Juutilainen.

== Area ==
The area of the Malmi Cemetery is 65 hectares, of which 54 hectares are cemeteries. Approximately 2,000 burials are carried out each year, which makes Malmi functionally the largest cemetery in Finland. There are a total of about 50,000 graves and about 200,000 burials have been made during the entire operation of the cemetery. Blocks 101–104 form a private Åberg Cemetery, which is not owned by the parish. However, the parish association manages it like any other cemetery. Block 91, on the other hand, is a former Oulunkylä municipality cemetery and heroes' cemetery area, which is connected to Malmi Cemetery.

=== Structures ===
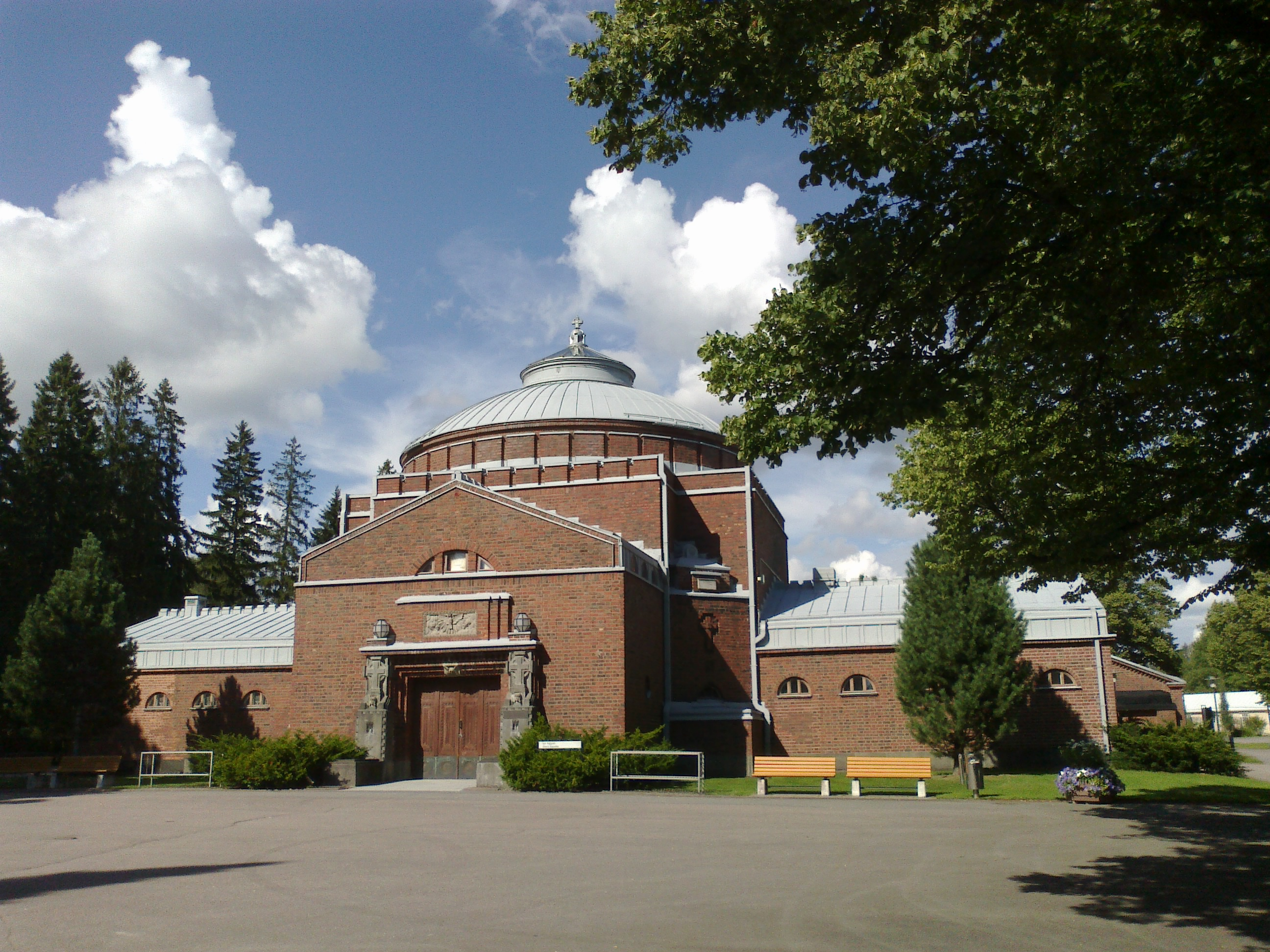
The Malmi Chapel, designed by Selim A. Lindqvist

The Malmi Chapel from 1923 was designed by architect Selim A. Lindqvist. Next to it are the smaller East, West and North Chapels, built in 1950, 1952 and 1956. The chapel building also houses a crematorium, which was completed in 1966. The new crematorium building was completed in November 2007 in the immediate vicinity of the chapel.

A private water tower was built on the hill at the northern end of the cemetery in the 1930s and has since been decommissioned. The building is protected by the Finnish Heritage Agency.

== Former train connection ==
The old main gate of Malmi Cemetery is along Pihlajamäentie, which was once part of one of the main roads leading east and north of Helsinki. As the cemetery was quite far outside the city area when completed, a funeral train rail connection was arranged there by building a two-kilometer-long power line from Malmi railway station. Regular train traffic began as early as February 1895. The line was decommissioned in 1954.

== See also ==
- Hietaniemi Cemetery
- Kulosaari Cemetery
- Puustellinmetsä mass grave
- Tattarisuo case

== Sources ==
=== Literature ===
- Marja Pehkonen: Hauraita muistoja Helsingin hautausmailta. Helsingin kaupunginmuseo (Narinkka-sarja) 2008. ISBN 978-952-223-283-0
- Antero Rautio: Pääkaupunkiseudun julkiset muistomerkit ja taideteokset. Karisto, Hämeenlinna 1998. ISBN 951-23-3664-2.
- Kai Sadinmaa: Kuolleiden kirja – eli kuinka kävelin Suomen suurimman hautausmaan halki ja opin kaiken elämästä, hautaamisesta, rakkaudenkaipuusta ja puista. Into, Helsinki 2019. ISBN 978-952-351-102-6
