= Tattarisuo case =

1930s crime in Finland

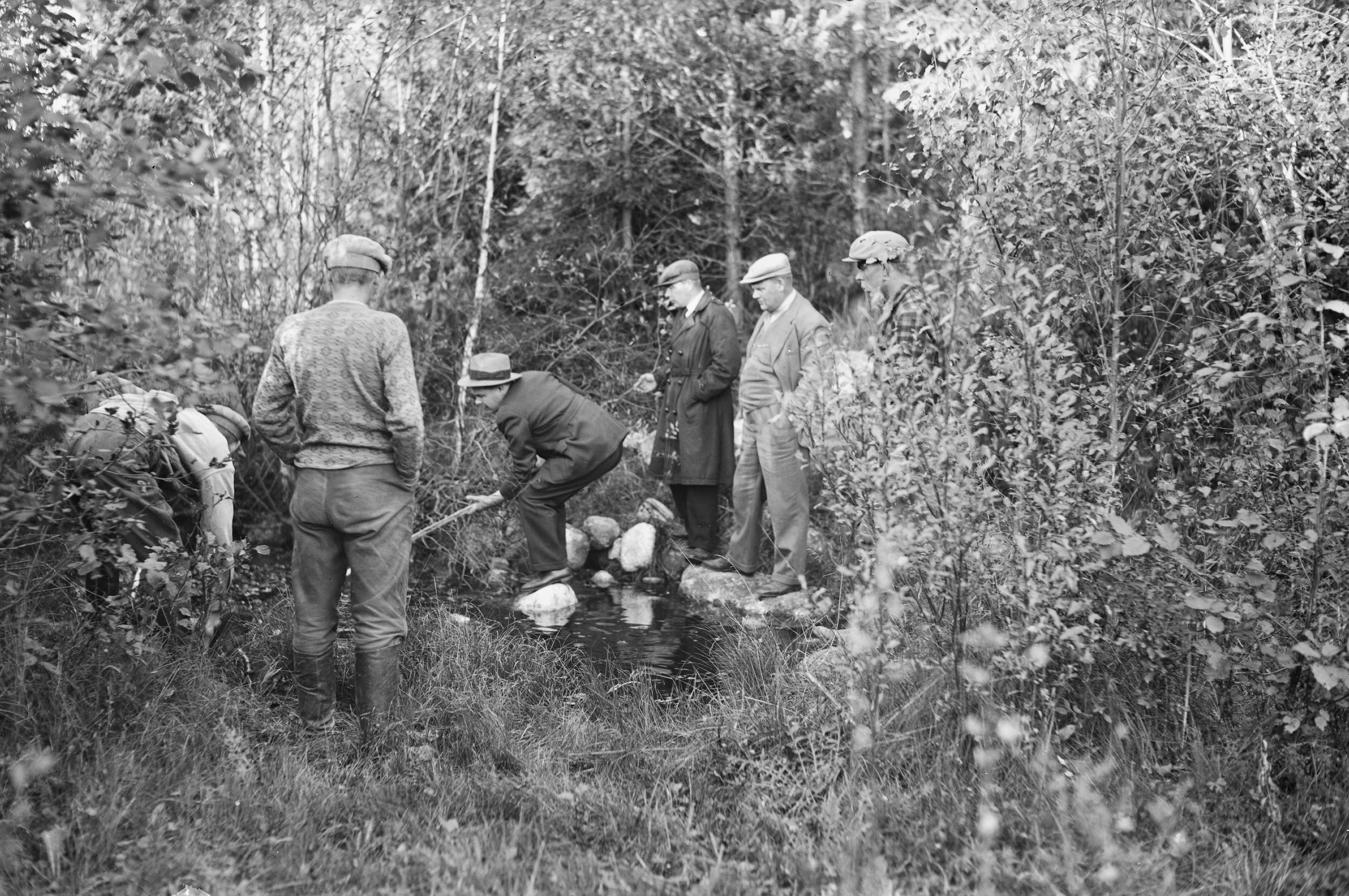
The spring of Tattarisuo is investigated in September 1931.

The Tattarisuo case, a Finnish criminal investigation from the 1930s, took place in the Tattarisuo area, then part of the rural outskirts of Helsinki. The investigation, which spanned about a year, eventually revealed that a small local group engaged in black magic was responsible for the crime. Some members of the group had stolen human remains from the Malmi Cemetery and used them in rituals conducted at a spring in Tattarisuo and its surrounding area. The case remains one of the most infamous in Finnish criminal history due to its connection with grave robbery and occult rituals.

== Investigation ==
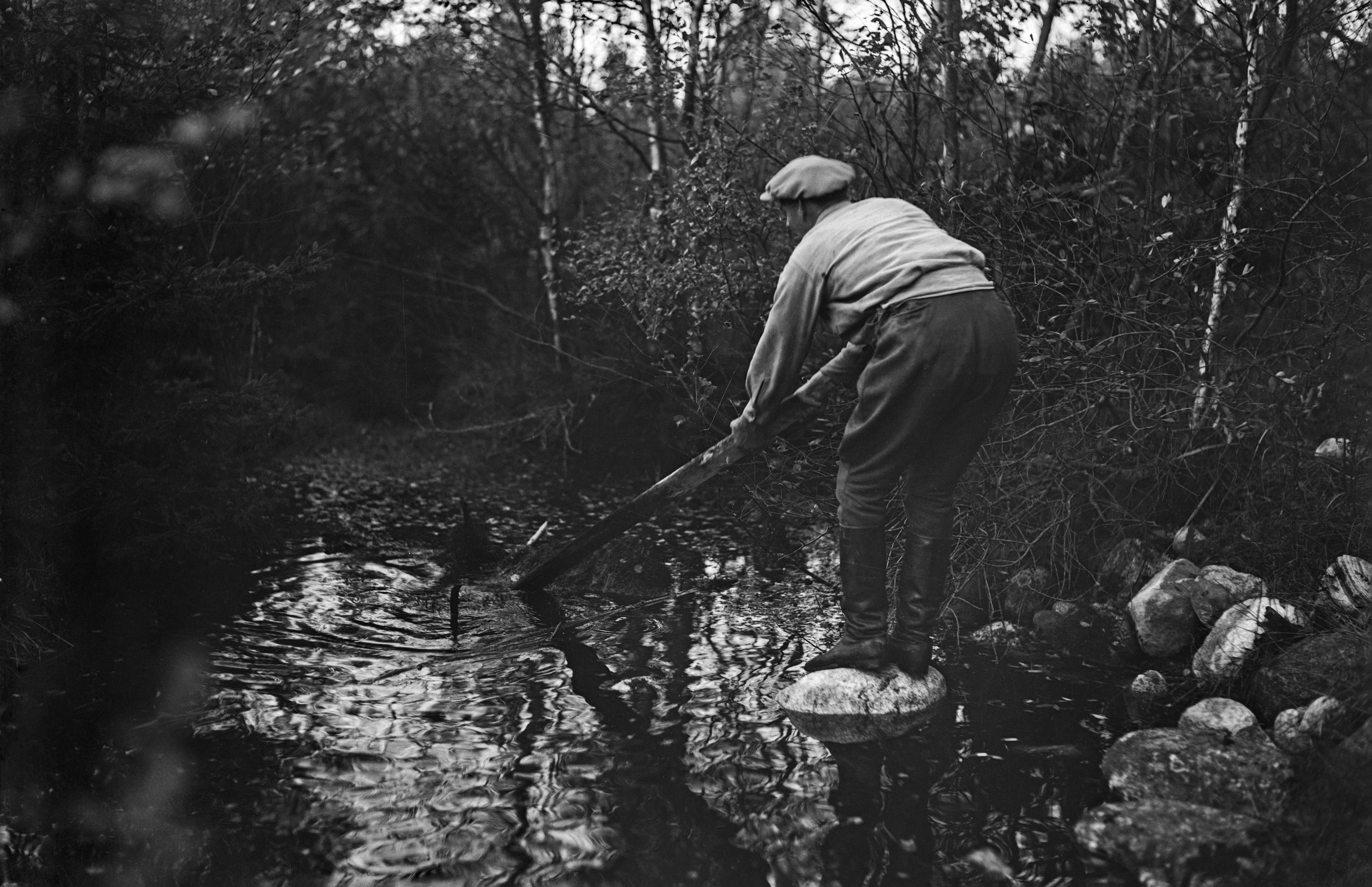
A man trying to collect body parts from the Tattarisuo spring in 1931

A 14-year-old student found a woman's severed hand on 19 August 1930, in the spring of Tattarisuo. The discovery alarmed the police, but then was forgotten until 18 September 1931, when more mutilated human body parts—several hands, feet, fingers, hair, and a head—were found in the same spring. The discoveries caused an uproar in the Finnish media.

=== Suspects ===
Finnish Freemasons, Oddfellows and the members of the Ruusu-Risti organization were suspected, owing to a local belief that they allegedly used human body parts in rituals. Although these organizations were ultimately found to be innocent, the controversy stirred by the case led to the Freemasons being excluded from the Finnish Officers' Union. A small head cheese factory in Sörnäinen was another suspect. The information supposedly connecting the factory to the case was proven false and the newspaper that reported it had to pay fines, but the Finnish saying "traces lead to the head cheese factory (jäljet johtavat sylttytehtaaseen)" remained in use. Far-right media in Finland also blamed the Tattarisuo case on Jewish ritual murder.

=== Perpetrators ===
The perpetrators behind the mutilations were the locally well-known driver Vilho Kallio, also known as Noita-Kallio ('Witch Kallio'), who lived at Hämeentie 72 in Helsinki, along with port workers Ville Saari and Johan Ilmari Hedman, and a couple of women. The perpetrators had mutilated the human remains found in open burial sites, known as linjahaudat (lit. 'line graves')—graves arranged in lines or rows, used in Finland for communally burying the poor during the early 20th century—in the Malmi Cemetery and then taken the body parts either to the spring or a hidden location within the cemetery. Their goal was to practice black magic, using the body parts to supposedly contact the spirit world. In doing so, they believed they would acquire knowledge and powers from the spirits to cure diseases, recover stolen property, and achieve similar objectives. One of their specific aims was to ensure a successful outcome in a lawsuit filed by Hedman's mother, seeking to have her son declared an illegitimate child of the late Dr. Walter Parviainen in order to claim a share of Parviainen's 20-million Finnish markka estate. Kallio had also practiced healing the sick for several years, using water from the spring, which he believed was imbued with healing energies from the body parts submerged in it.

The perpetrators were told to carry out the mutilations based on the instructions of seamstress Ida Viden. Viden had allegedly read letters and sentences manifest on the wall that dictated how the mutilation was to be done. Viden and Kallio went to pray at the Malmi cemetery according to the instructions given by The Black Bible as well. They had visited the Lapinlahti Cemetery ten years earlier to pray in order to find out about a case of missing money.

== Arrest and trial ==
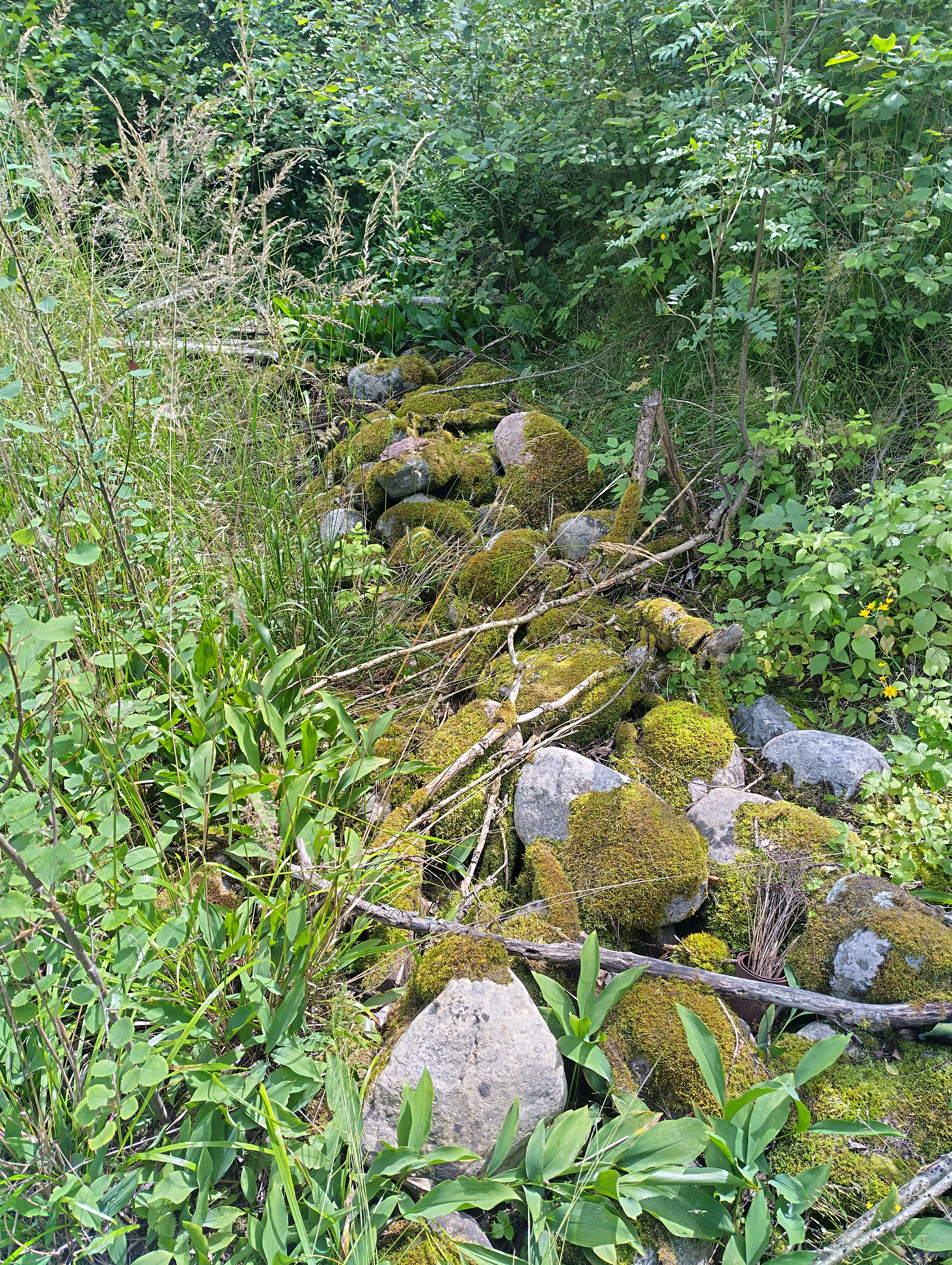
The dried-up spring of the Tattarisuo swamp in July 2026

On 28 September 1932, the main perpetrators of the case were sentenced to imprisonment for corpse mutilation by the court of Helsinki, and the sentences were upheld by the Supreme Court of Finland. Kallio received a two-year and four-month prison sentence, Saari received a three-year prison sentence, and Viden received a three-year sentence for incitement to mutilation and false reporting.

== In popular culture ==
Finnish thriller writer Aarne Haapakoski's debut work Mustalais-suon arvoitus (1931) and Aki Ollikainen's novel Musta satu (2015) are based on the Tattarisuo case.

== Bibliography ==
- Häkkinen, Perttu; Iitti, Vesa (2015). Valonkantajat, Välähdyksiä suomalaisesta salatieteestä [Lightbearers: Insights into Finnish Occultism] (in Finnish). Like kustannus Oy. ISBN 978-952-01-1158-8.
