= Haaga executions of 1918 =

Coordinates: 60°12′56″N 24°53′19″E

The Haaga executions of 1918 took place in Etelä-Haaga (‘South Haaga’) in what was then the Rural Municipality of Helsinge during the Battle of Helsinki of the Finnish Civil War on 12 April 1918. A total of 45 persons suspected of belonging to the Red Guards were executed by German troops at a bog at 8 o’clock p.m. at the site of the present Eliel Saarisen tie, halfway from the Pitäjänmäki roundabout to the tunnel leading to the Huopalahti Station, at the site of a pedestrian crossing. 28 of those executed were buried in the Pohjois-Haaga mass grave, which is located close to the current Pohjois-Haaga railway station.

During the Battle of Helsinki, the German Baltic Sea Division advanced on 11 April to Leppävaara, Espoo. A group of Reds sought shelter in the cellar of Carl Theodor Ward’s garden in South Haaga, at 12 Vanha Viertotie. When the Germans arrived there, shots were exchanged, and two German soldiers were killed. The executions were said to be a retaliation for this. According to another version, shots were fired at the car of the German commander Rüdiger von der Goltz, and the executions were a revenge for this.

During the night, the cellar became a prison, and while some Reds were allowed to go free, others were brought there in their place. The Reds were interrogated through interpreters, but not for long, as the Germans wanted to move on. 25 male prisoners were handed over to the Finnish Whites, and rest of the male prisoners were ordered to form a line by the near-by road, and every third was selected to be executed. They were ordered to march to a near-by bog, where the Germans shot them. After that the families of the victims were allowed to identify them and take them to be buried. The rest of the bodies, most likely people not from Helsinki or the Rural Municipality, were loaded on to carts driven by horses and taken a couple of kilometres away to be buried in a pit that had been dug in connection of the building of Krepost Sveaborg. A modest wooden cross was erected at the site of the executions, but it was lost when a road was constructed at the site.

Afterwards, the Finns blamed the Germans for the events, and vice versa. The local Workers’ Association did not want to study the events, and in addition, its minutes for 1916–18 had disappeared. They were found in ca. 2008 in Turku, in the archives of Åbo Akademi.

The names of 24 or 25 of those executed are known, but the names of 20 victims are still not known.

In 1920, the bodies in the North Haaga mass grave were exhumed, and the Estonians present thought they identified the body of their former Estonian Deputy Prime Minister Jüri Vilms. According to the story the Estonians told at the time, Vilms and his retinue had been in Suursaari, where the Germans allegedly had captured them and brought them to Helsinki on a ship named Regina and then shot them at the Töölö Sugar Factory and then buried them in the North Haaga mass grave.

Vilms had been a conspicuously tall man, and such a man was found in the grave. Three bodies were then transported to Estonia and buried in Viljandi County. Later it turned out that the Regina had not been to Suursaari or even moved anywhere from Helsinki during that spring. In the 2000s the idea came up that the matter could be investigated with the help of DNA technology, but Finnish Foreign Minister Erkki Tuomioja thought that such an investigation would be considered offensive in Estonia, and consequently, nothing was done about the matter. In 2008, a document was found in the Military Archives of Sweden, according to which Vilms was executed in May 1918 in Hauho. Vilms’ name was for a long time in a plaque at the mass grave in North Haaga, but in 2015 a new plaque was placed there without his name.

This was the only mass execution that the Germans organized in Finland.

== See also ==
- Pohjois-Haaga mass grave
