= Pohjois-Haaga mass grave =

Mass grave in Lassila, Helsinki, Finland

Coordinates: 60°13′41″N 24°52′56″E

- Pohjois-Haagan veljeshauta
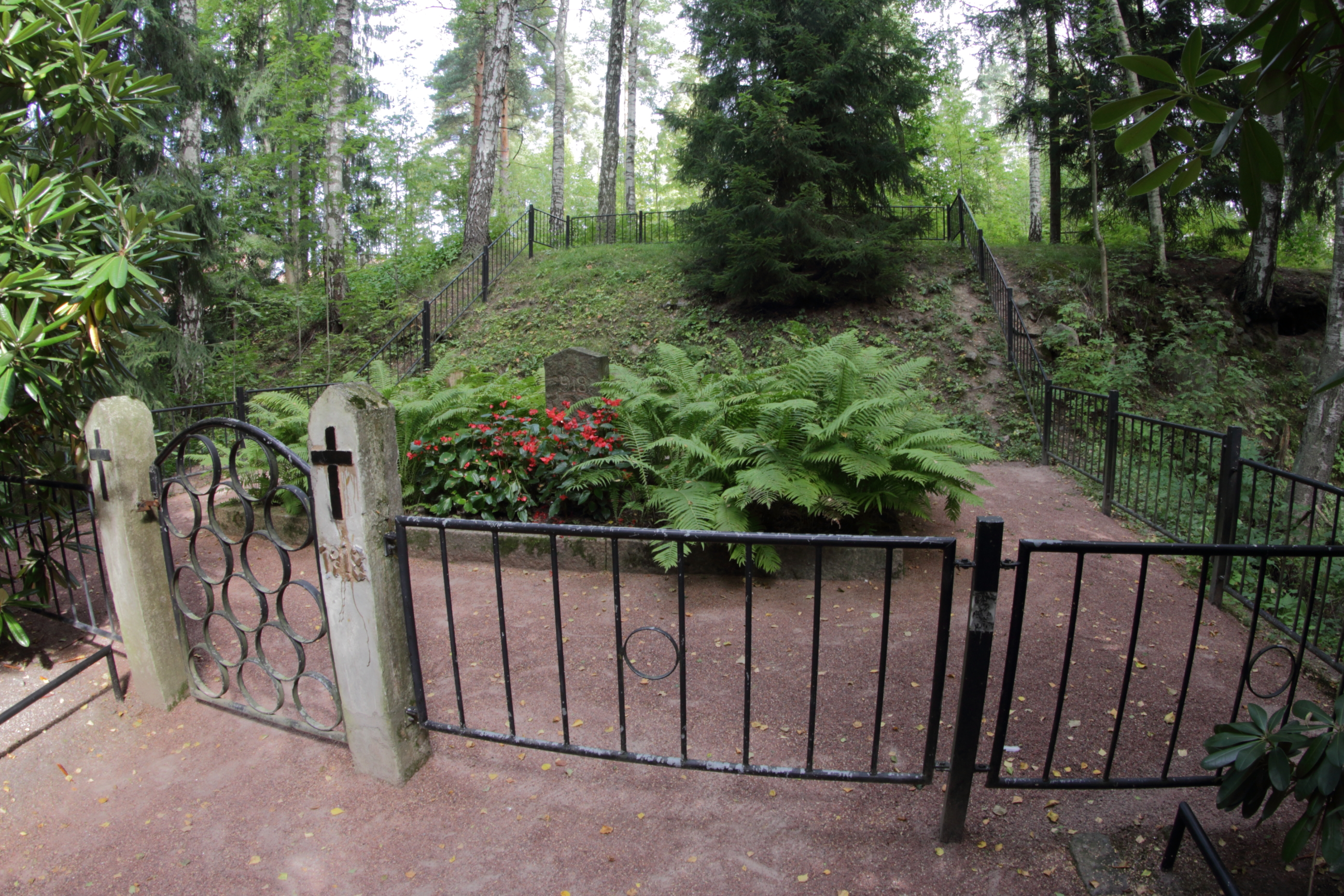
- The Pohjois-Haaga mass grave
- Interactive map of Pohjois-Haaga mass grave
- Material: Stone
- Completion date: 1919
- Dedicated to: Victims of the Haaga executions of 1918

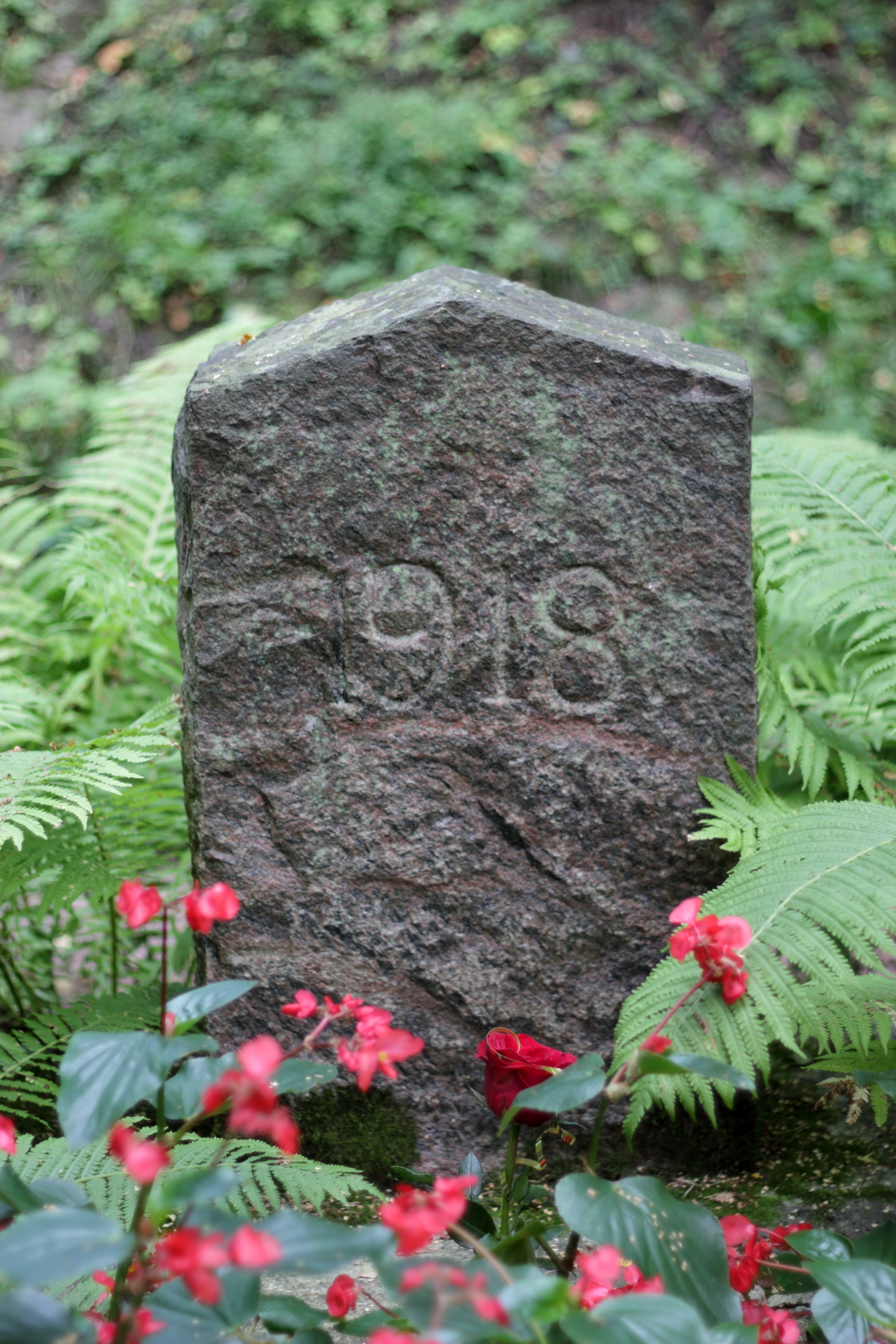
Pohjois-Haaga mass grave.

The Pohjois-Haaga mass grave is a grave in Lassila, Helsinki, Finland, near the Pohjois-Haaga railway station that dates to the time of the Finnish Civil War in 1918. 28 men of the Red Guards or civilians thought to have been affiliated with them executed by the German Baltic Sea Division soldiers are buried at the site.

== History ==
During the Battle of Helsinki, on 12 April 1918, advancing German troops executed ca. 40–50 men they had apprehended, who mostly belonged to the Red Guards. The executions took place around 8 p.m. at a bog that located halfway between the Vihdintie Roundabout and Riistavuori. When the locals had fetched from the pile of bodies their family members, the rest, people from out of town, were transported to a pit in an uninhabited location near-by. The grave was located along an artillery lane close to Base no. XXIV of the Krepost Sveaborg, a fortification that was built to shield Helsinki in the event of war.

The events leading up to the executions or the identities of all those executed are not known for certain. According to one version, the Germans found ca. 150 persons in a cellar at 12 Vanha Viertotie, people belonging most to the Reds. The Reds had flown a white flag to signal that they would surrender, but someone had opened fire killing two German soldiers. After this, the Germans ordered all the men in a line along the road and selected every third to be executed. Another version has it that the executions were a reprisal for the German commander, General Rüdiger von der Goltz’s car having been shot at. On the other hand, it was said that the local White Guards had played a part in the events. This is said because many of those executed belonged to the local Red Guards or were leaders of the working class. It is also said that people slated for execution were taken from their homes and brought to the site.

According to a traditional view, Estonian Deputy Prime Minister Jüri Vilms and his companions Arnold Jürgens and Johannes Peistik as well as their guide Aleksei Rünk, executed on 12 or 13 April on the grounds of the Töölö Sugar Factory, had also been buried in the same mass grave. Estonian investigators exhumed in December 1920 four bodies that they identified as Vilms, Jürgens, Peistik, and Rünk on the basis of their clothes, and they were reburied in Estonia. Finnish historian Seppo Zetterberg has later come to the conclusion that the story of Vilms’ execution in Helsinki and burial in the Haaga mass grave is unreliable and possibly made up.

The Pohjois-Haaga mass grave is now a protected site that belongs to the city of Helsinki. The site has a memorial erected in 1919, made by stone workers of the city, with no text but the year 1918 inscribed. There is also a metal fence around the grave. In May 1996, the city of Helsinki added a plaque with information of the events leading to the creation of the mass grave. With regard to the fate of Vilms, the plaque contained numerous errors. In December 2015, a new plaque was placed at the grave, with no mention of Vilms or his retinue. According to the new plaque, 28 men had been buried in the grave, when there were a total of 45 or 46 men executed.

A large wooden cross had been erected by unknown people at the site of the 1918 executions in Etelä-Haaga, but it was taken away in the early 1930s. It was replaced twice, but finally taken away for good when the street Eliel Saarisen tie was built in the late 1940s.

== See also ==
- Haaga executions of 1918
