= Tattarisuo =

Coordinates: 60°15′28″N 25°03′25″E

Tattarisuo (in Finnish) Tattarmossen (in Swedish)
- Neighborhood of Helsinki
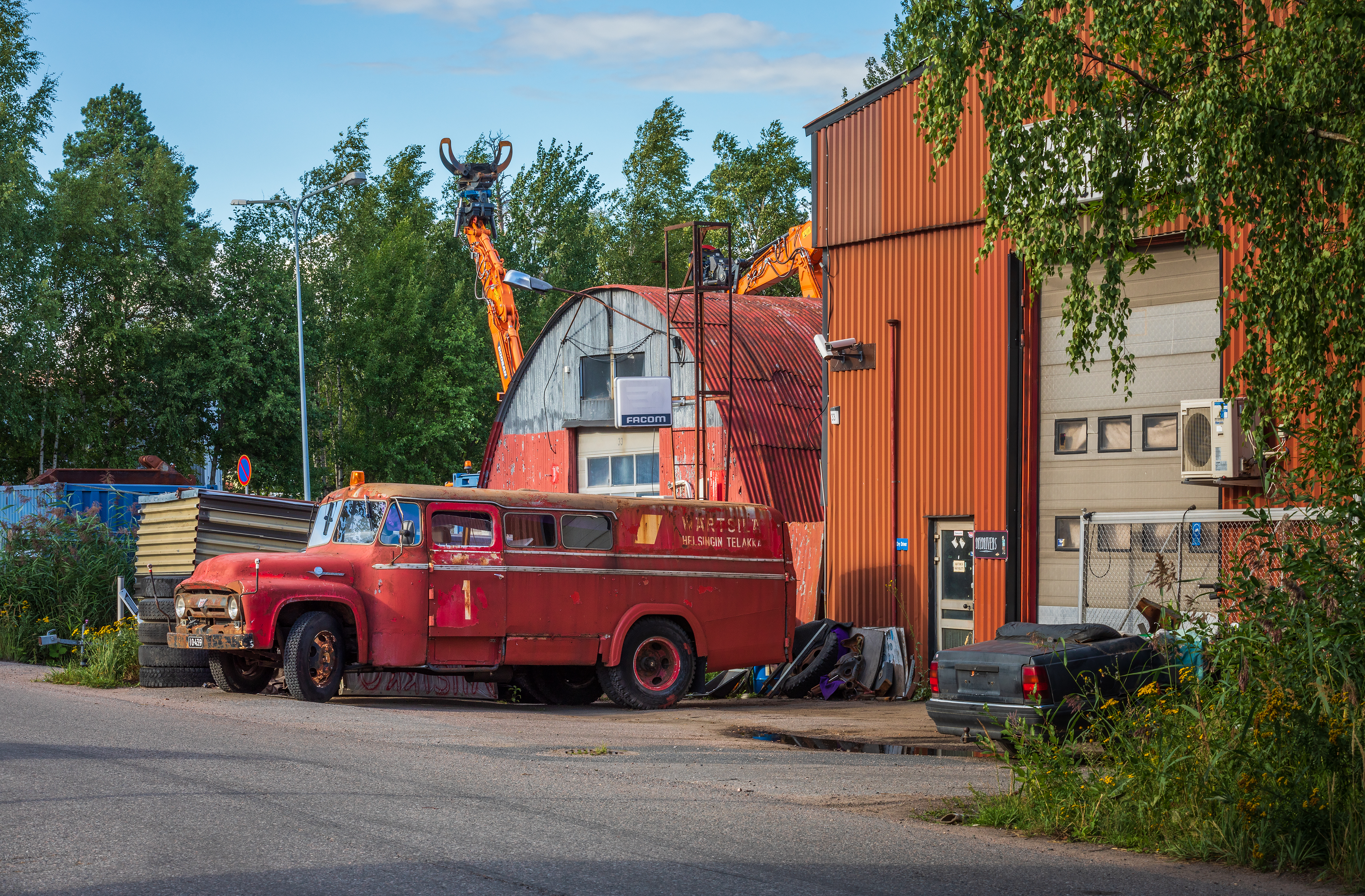
- Warehouses along the Kaasutintie street

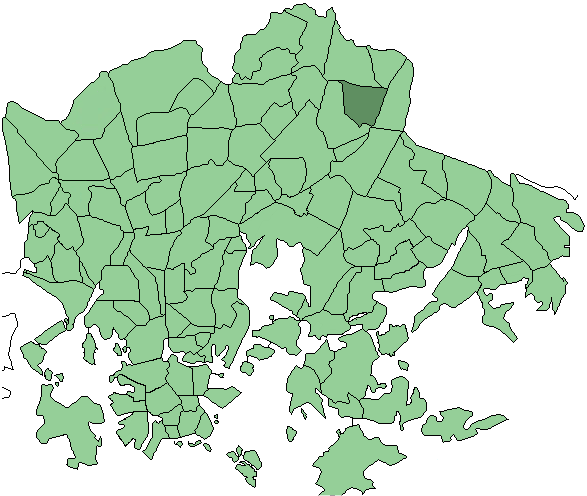
- Location in Helsinki
- Country: Finland
- Province: Southern Finland
- Region: Uusimaa
- Sub-region: Helsinki
- Time zone: UTC+2 (EET)
  - Summer (DST): UTC+3 (EEST)

Tattarisuo (Finnish: [ˈtɑtːɑriˌsuo̯]; Swedish: Tattarmossen) is a northeastern neighborhood of Helsinki, Finland, located east of the former Helsinki-Malmi Airport, about 5 kilometres (3.1 mi) from the centre of Malmi. It has a population of 70 (in 2005), and contains 1084 jobs (December 2003). The neighbourhood consists mostly of small industry and warehouses. Many of the companies in the area deal with metal recycling.

The woods in the area are known for their bird life and are popular among birdwatchers in Helsinki.

Tattarisuo is well known for the notorious criminal case that happened in the early 1930s.

== See also ==
- Alppikylä
