= Suurmetsä =

Coordinates: 60°16′N 25°03′E

Suurmetsä (in Finnish) Storskog (in Swedish)
- Subdistrict of Helsinki
- Interactive map of Suurmetsä (in Finnish); Storskog (in Swedish)
- Country: Finland
- Province: Southern Finland
- Region: Uusimaa
- Sub-region: Helsinki
- Time zone: UTC+2 (EET)
  - Summer (DST): UTC+3 (EEST)

Suurmetsä (Finnish), Storskog (Swedish) is a subdistrict of Helsinki, Finland.
