= Buses in Helsinki =

Overview of bus services in Helsinki

Local and regional bus services are a large part of public transport in the Helsinki region. HSL bus services include internal services in Helsinki, Espoo, Kauniainen, Vantaa, Kerava, Kirkkonummi, Sipoo, Siuntio and Tuusula and regional services between them.

Since 2010, the planning and timetabling of these bus routes have been done by Helsinki Region Transport, an organisation to which the aforementioned municipalities belong. Prior to HSL's inception, Helsinki's internal lines were the responsibility of Helsinki City Transport, with all other bus services being organised by YTV, HSL's predecessor.

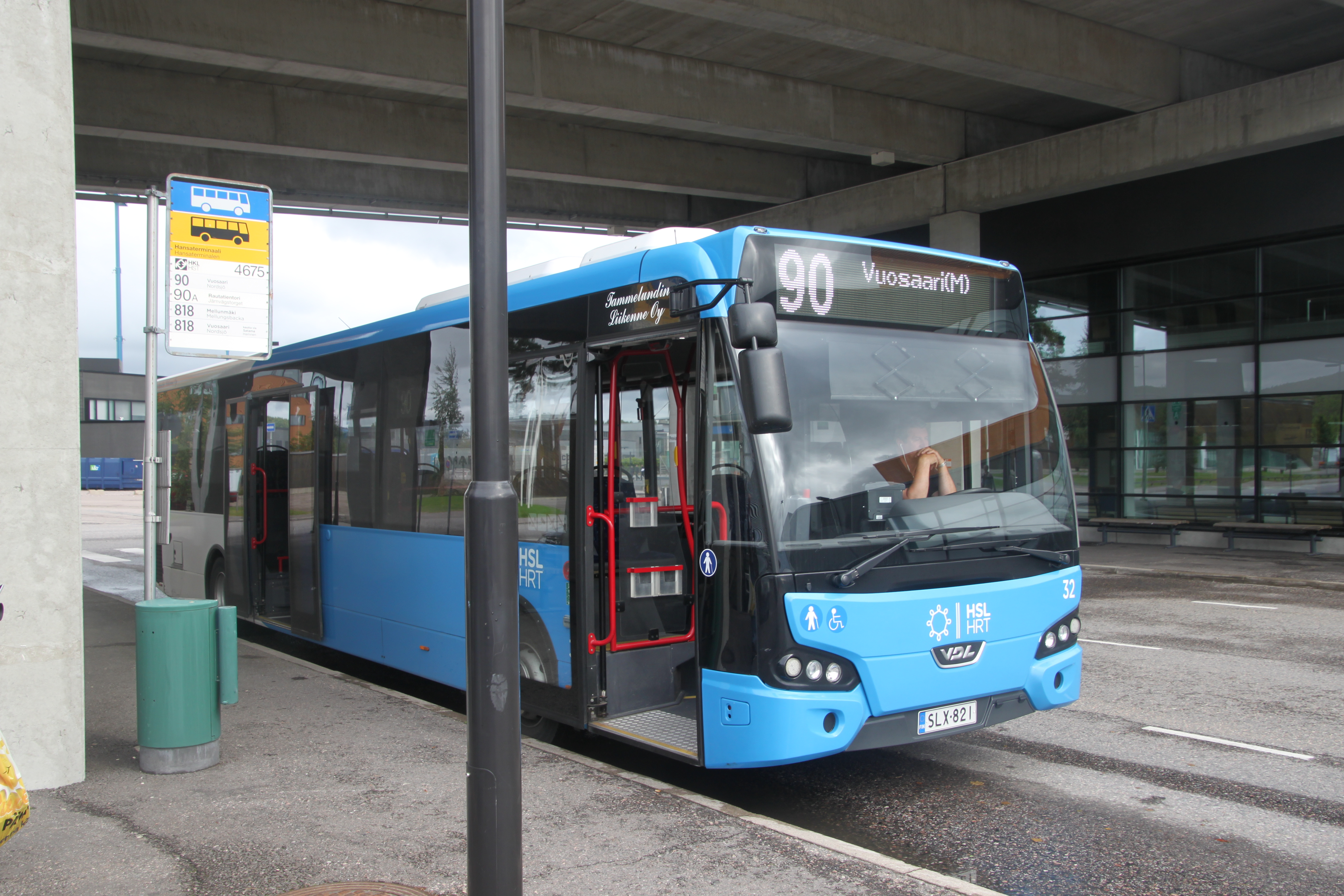
A 2-door VDL Citea operated by Tammelundin Liikkenne in the new HSL livery, operating line 90 towards Vuosaari metro station.

== Principles of line numbering ==
Bus lines running solely inside the municipality of Helsinki have two-digit numbers, except for lines 52 and 53, which extend into Espoo, as well as trunk line 30 and night line 95N, both of which extend into Vantaa. Three-digit numbers are used by all other lines, (except for Helsinki internal lines 500, 506, 611B and 831(K), as well as part of Helsinki's minibus routes).

Some lines have a letter or two at the end of their number, for example 611B. This denotes that the line differs from the main route in some way. For example, the route of line 611B is shorter than that of line 611. These letters mean the following:

- A = a lengthened route
- B = a shortened route (denotes an evening route for lines 82B)
- H = a tram route ending at Töölö, Koskela or Vallila depot
- K = a lengthier route through a smaller neighbourhood or termination somewhere different
- M = a metro replacement bus terminating at Mellunmäki.
- N = night line
- R = a line operated by a robot bus (all lines have been discontinued)
- T = a lengthier route, often involving serving long cul-de-sacs or (occasionally) termination somewhere different (in the case of buses to southern Espoo this denoted going via Lauttasaari)
- V = a quicker route, usually going along more main roads, or via an industrial area, usually only during peak hours or a metro replacement bus terminating at Vuosaari.
- X = a metro, train or tram replacement bus
- Z = a quicker route, usually along more main roads or highways, again usually only during peak hours.

== Operation hours ==
The majority of lines run between 5:00 and 23:30, with more popular lines continuing until 1:30. Only a small amount of lines run between 1:30–5:00 on weekdays, mainly trunk lines and lines to/from Helsinki Airport.

Night lines run mainly on weekend nights between 1:00 and 4:00. This is the only time that most areas have a direct bus connection to central Helsinki, as most daytime bus lines are feeder lines to a train or metro station. Night lines in east and northeast Helsinki and southern Espoo are an exceptional case in the HSL area, as most lines in these areas tend to start operation between 23:00 and 00:30. Individual lines in other areas may also start at this time. The main reason for this is that the metro stops running at around 23:30, rendering feeder lines in east Helsinki and southern Espoo useless after this time.

== Trunk, minibus and U lines ==
Most buses in the HSL area run on the same principle. Most are blue at the front and white at the back, and carry multiple logos of both HSL and the actual operator of the bus. Electric buses also carry a cable and plug decal on each side. Boarding is through the front door only, where you show your ticket to the driver or card reader. Generally, buses do not stop at every bus stop, to speed up journey times and to improve fuel efficiency; thus passengers waiting at a stop are expected to hail an approaching bus by waving.

Buses that operate on trunk lines, are orange at the front, instead of blue. Card readers are also provided at the middle doors (and rear doors on articulated buses), through which you may also board. These buses therefore work on a proof-of-payment system, like rail-based transport in the HSL area. These buses can run as frequently as every 6 minutes during the peak; nowadays, most run until 2:00, with some running around the clock.

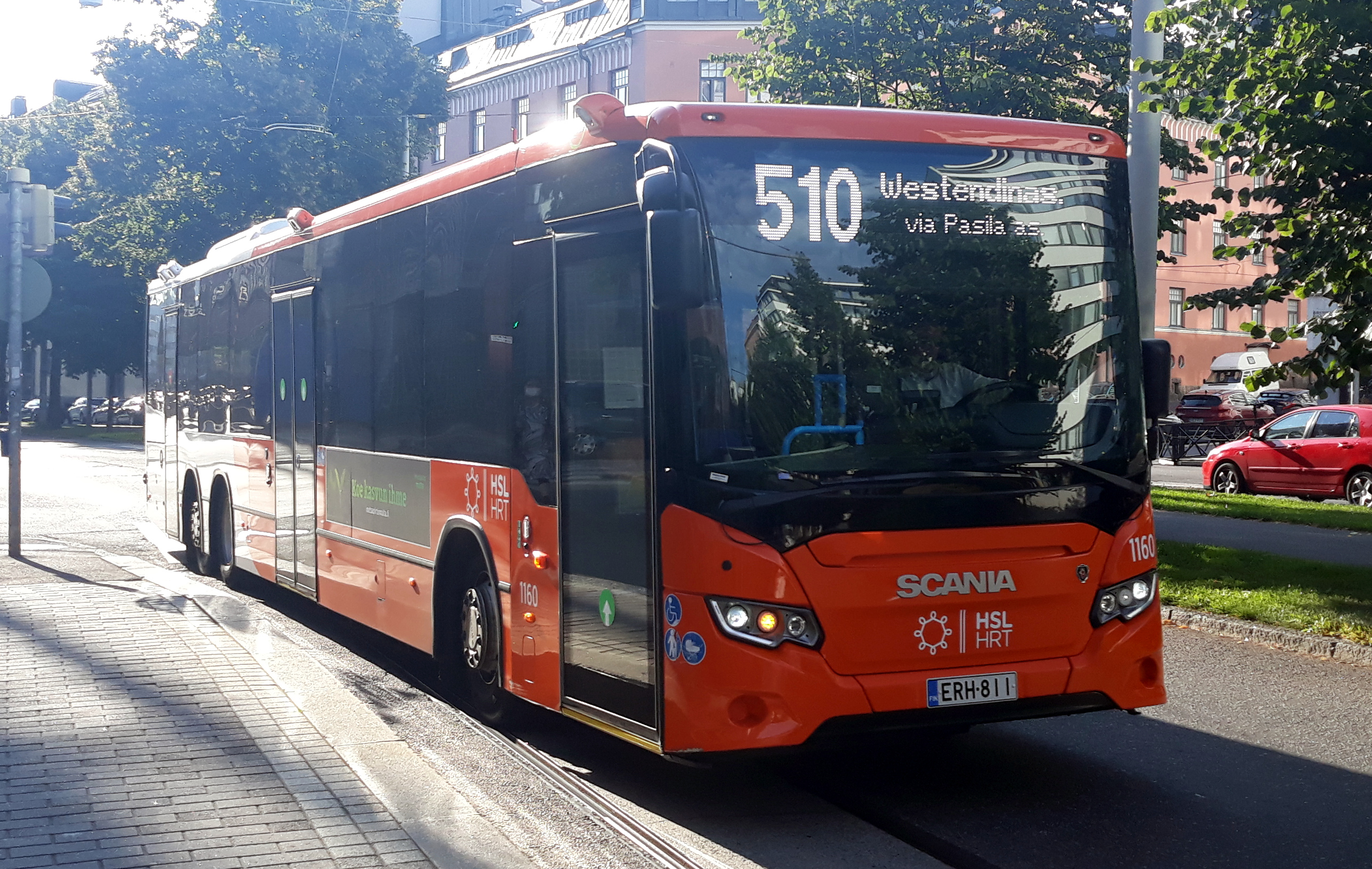
A bus operating trunk line 510 in Sörnäinen. Note the orange colour and green arrow stickers on the front and middle doors.

Not all areas have the traffic or road space to accommodate full-size buses. Therefore, some bus lines, like the 26 in Salmisaari or the 167 in Kauklahti, are run with smaller minibuses. These have a similar colour scheme to, and work on the same principle as normal HSL buses. These typically have around 15 seats. These same minibuses also run neighbourhood lines. These go up much smaller residential streets, utilising tight turning circles, and can stop anywhere on a road, as long as it is safe to do so.

U lines are normal long-distance buses or coaches that terminate in the HSL area, but also extend far outside it, to Hanko, Karis, Karkkila, Bromarv, Ingå, Lohja, Nurmijärvi, Mäntsälä and Porvoo. The timetables and routes are decided by the operators of the route, usually Pohjolan Liikenne, Salon Tilausmatkat, Korsisaari or Pohjolan Liikenne, and/or the Centre for Economic Development, Transport and the Environment (Finnish: ELY-keskus). HSL tickets are accepted on these buses within the HSL area only. The operator's own tickets are accepted along the entire route.

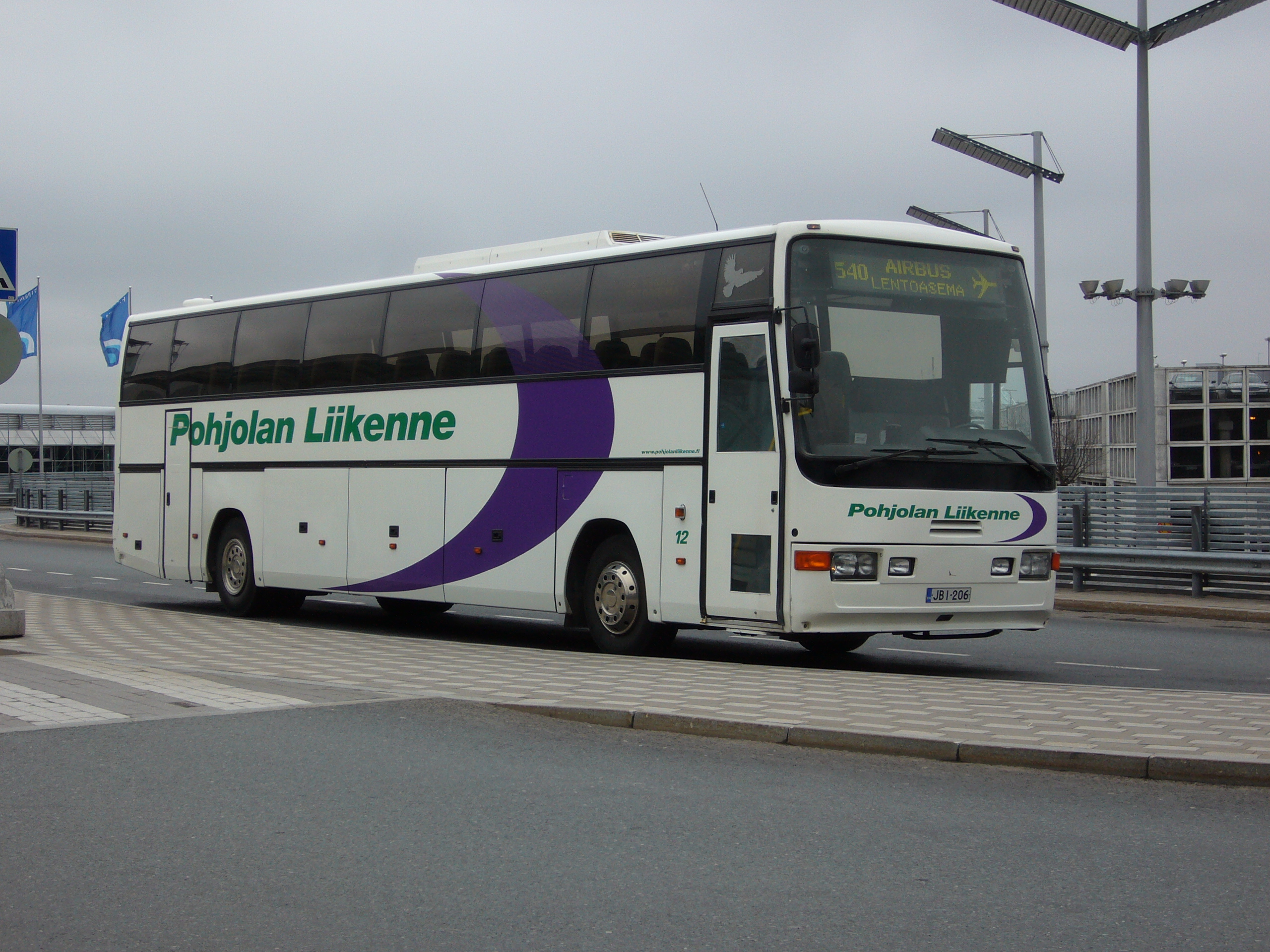
A Pohjolan Liikenne bus on (now discontinued) line U540, from Espoon keskus, at Helsinki Airport.

== Lines ==
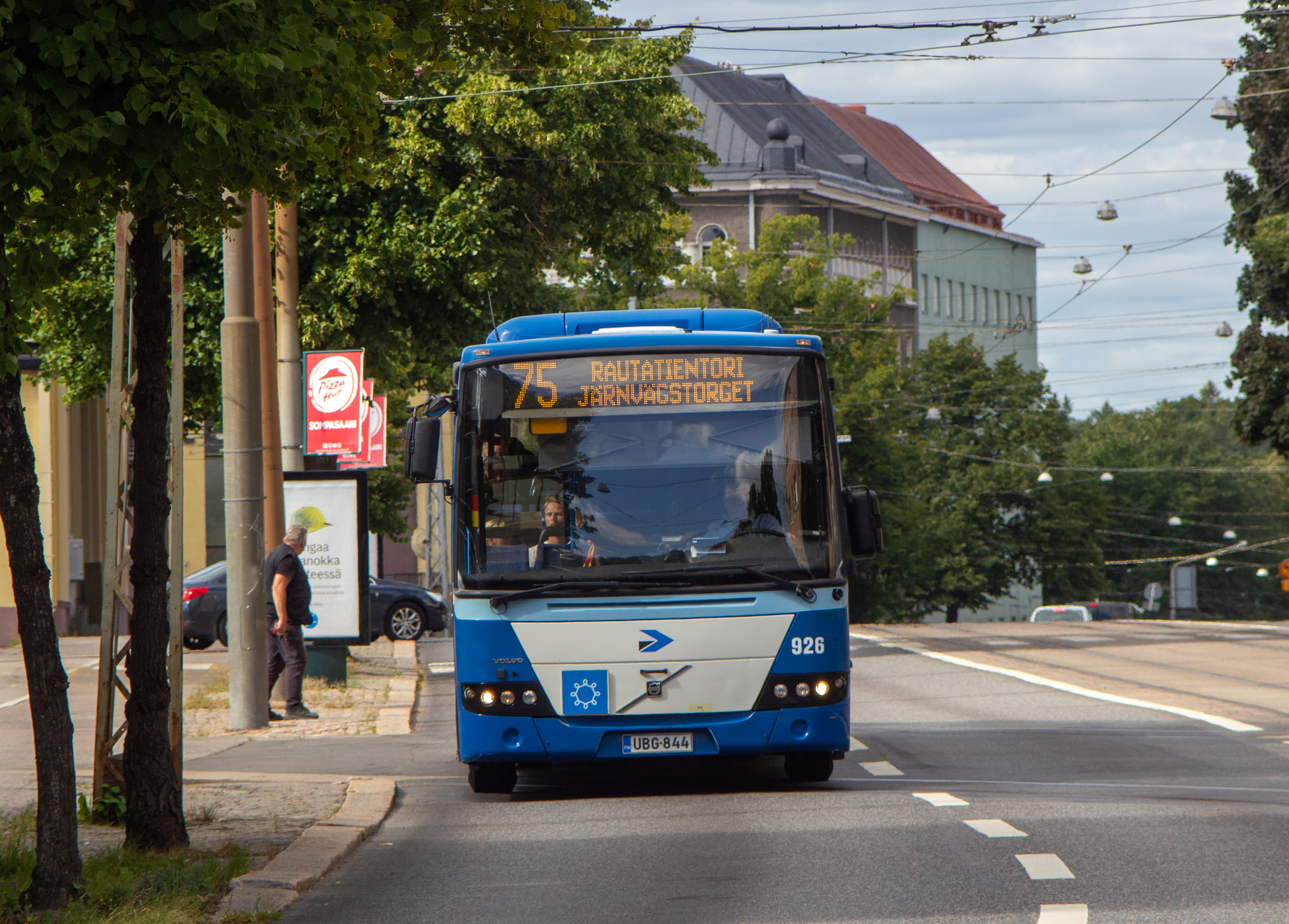
Line 75, which runs from Puistola station to Rautatientori, on Hämeentie.

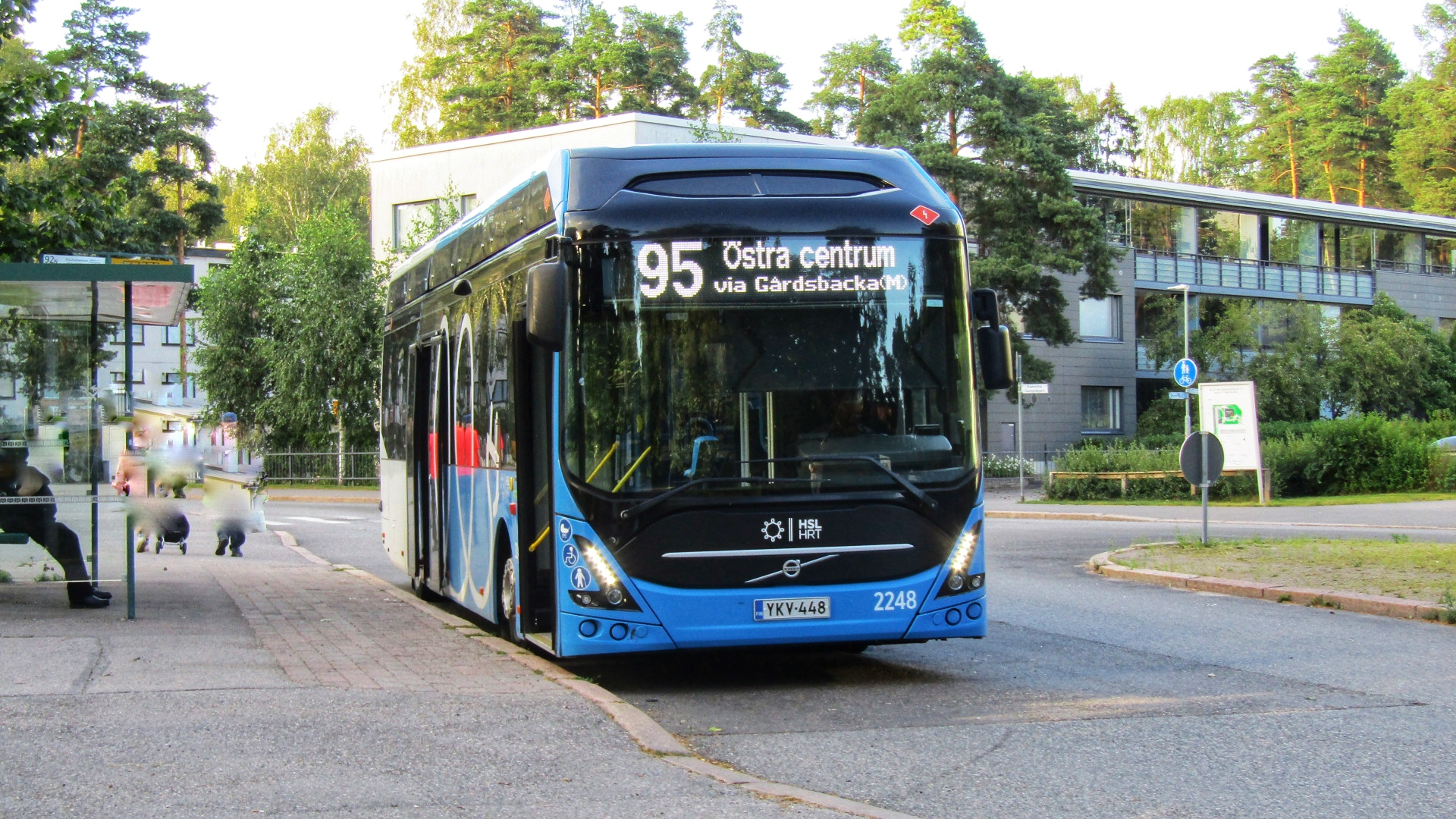
Volvo 7900 Electric on line 95, running Itäkeskus–Mellunmäki–Kontula–Keinutie, at Keinutie bus stop.

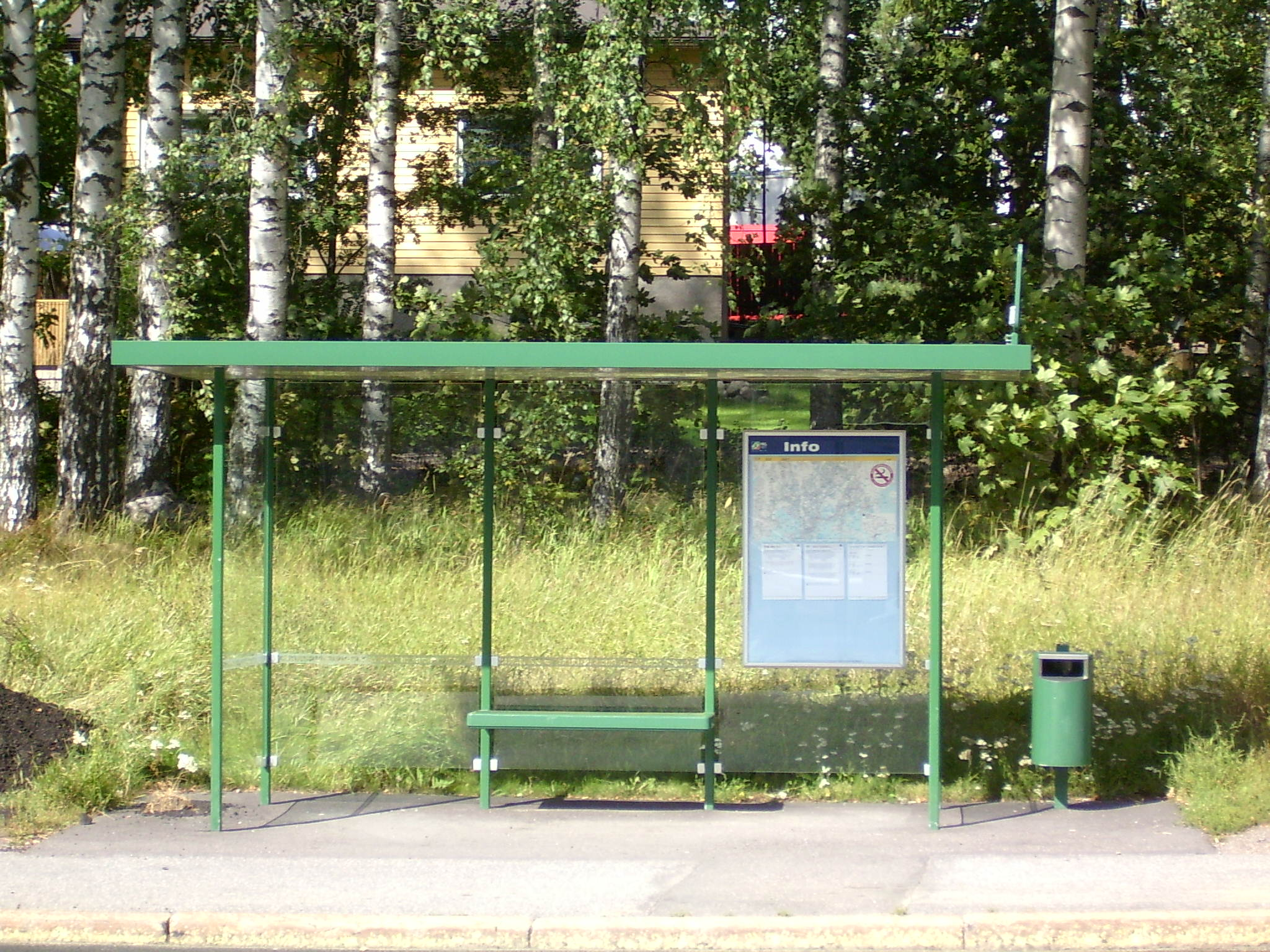
A bus shelter in Jakomäki.

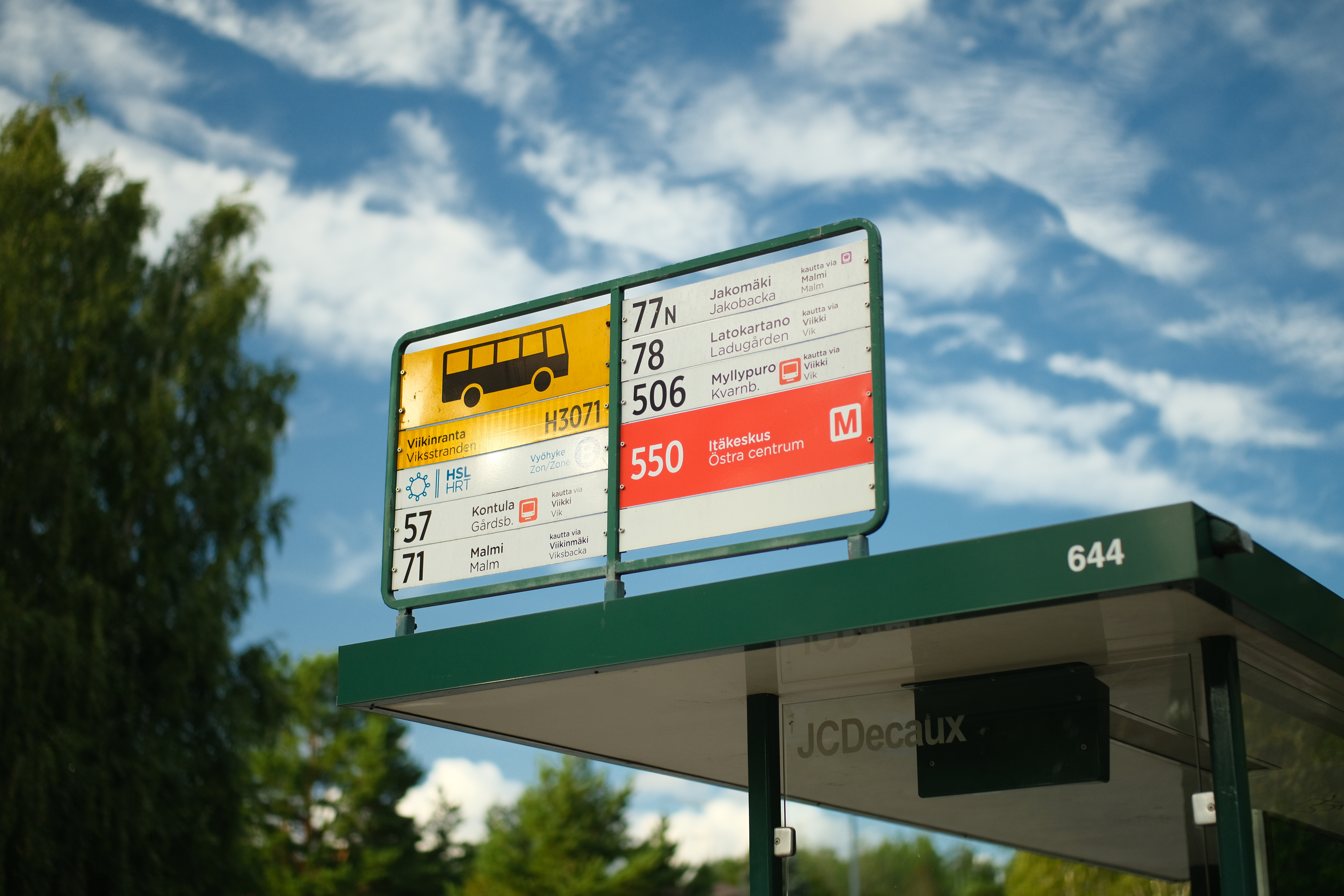
A bus stop flag on a shelter in Viikinranta. Note the double size orange plate: this denotes a trunk line, here line 550.

Many internal and regional lines have their central terminus in either Rautatientori or Elielinaukio, with the other in a residential area. Most lines in east Helsinki are feeder lines to metro stations: in this case, the central terminus is at a metro station. In north Helsinki and Espoo, as well as Vantaa, Kerava and Kirkkonummi, some lines operate as feeders for commuter rail stations, like Tikkurila, Kerava, Leppävaara, Myyrmäki and Espoon keskus.

There are also many lines that cross municipal borders in the HSL area. Most terminate at a local railway station, and act as feeder lines. Lines passing through Kauniainen are considered as Espoo internal lines.

Outside of the central areas, especially in Kirkkonummi, Sipoo and Siuntio, internal lines are focused mainly or entirely on commuting to school and work, and are heavily subsidised. Outside of peak hours, these lines run rarely, if at all. This makes them fairly useless for leisure travel.

The public transport provision and service level in Espoo, Vantaa and Kerava is not as good as that provided in southern Helsinki, but it is fairly good compared to the rest of Finland. In these areas, the public transport can be compared to that of Tampere and Turku, which are of a similar size.

=== Helsinki internal lines (two-digit lines) ===
24h means that the line also operates on weekday nights (from 1:30-5:00):

No.	Route
16	Rautatientori – Kruununhaka – Merihaka – Kulosaari – Mustikkamaa (Korkeasaari)
21	Kamppi – Ruoholahti (M) – Vattuniemi – Lauttasaari (M)
22	Punavuori – Ruoholahti (M) – Lauttasaari (M) – Katajaharju
22B	Lauttasaari (M) – Katajaharju
23	Rautatientori – Kallio – Pasila – Pirkkola (until 1:30)
24	Kamppi – Hietaniemi – Töölö – Seurasaari
24S	Asema-aukio – Töölö – (Meilahti –) Seurasaari (public holidays only)
24X	Asema-aukio – Hietaniemi (Christmas only)
25	Kamppi – Pajamäki
37	Kamppi – Honkasuo (24h)
41	Kamppi – Pohjois-Haagan station
42	Kamppi – Maununneva – Kannelmäki
52	Kuninkaantammi – Kannelmäki – Huopalahti station – Munkkiniemi – Otaniemi
53	Arabianranta – Oulunkylä – Metsälä – Pirkkola – Pohjois-Haaga – Pitäjänmäki – Uusmäki
54	Itäkeskus (M) – Ring I – Pitäjänmäki
55	Rautatientori – Kalasatama (M) – Arabianranta – Koskela
56	Kalasatama (M) – Kumpula – Metsälä – Kannelmäki
57	Kontula (M) – Viikki – Käpylä – Munkkiniemi
59	Sompasaari – Kalasatama (M) – Kumpula – Metsälä – Pasila – Pitäjänmäki – Malminkartano
61	Rautatientori – Pukinmäki – Siltamäki
63	Kamppi – Ruskeasuo – Metsälä – Maunula – Paloheinä
64	Rautatientori – Itä-Pakila (24h)
65	Rautatientori – Käpylä – Veräjämäki – Veräjälaakso (24h)
66	Rautatientori – Maunula – Paloheinä (until 1:30)
67	Rautatientori – Metsälä – Pakila – Torpparinmäki (until 1:30)
69	Kamppi – Pasila – Käpylä – Malmi – Jakomäki
70	Kamppi – Töölö – Pihlajamäki – Pukinmäki – Malmi
71	Rautatientori – Arabianranta – Pihlajisto – Pihlajamäki – Malmi
73	Hakaniemi – Malmi – Puistola station – Ala-Tikkurila
74	Hakaniemi – Malmi – Tapanila – Puistola – Heikinlaakso
75	Rautatientori – Jakomäki – Puistola station
77	Rautatientori – Tattarisuo – Jakomäki
78	Rautatientori – Latokartano
79	Herttoniemi (M) – Latokartano – Malmi – Siltamäki – Puistola station
79B	Siilitie (M) – Latokartano
80	Herttoniemi (M) – Roihuvuori – Itäkeskus (M)
81	Kulosaari (M) – Herttoniemenranta – Herttoniemi (M) – Länsi-Herttoniemi
82	Herttoniemi (M) – Roihuvuori – Itäkeskus (M)
82B	Herttoniemi (M) – Tammisalo – Roihuvuori – Itäkeskus (M) (evening line)
83	Herttoniemi (M) – Tammisalo
84	Herttoniemi (M) – Gunillankallio
85	Herttoniemi (M) – Jollas
85K	Herttoniemi (M) – Yliskylä– Jollas (evening line)
86	Herttoniemi (M) – Santahamina
86K	Herttoniemi (M) – Reherintie - Santahamina
87	Herttoniemi (M) – Kruunuvuorenranta
88	Herttoniemi (M) – Kaitalahti
89	Herttoniemi (M) – Yliskylä
90	Vuosaari (M) – Aurinkolahti – Vuosaari harbour
92	Itäkeskus (M) – Myllypuro
94	Itäkeskus (M) – Porttitie – Kontula (M) – Kontulankaari
94A	Kotikonnuntie – Kontula (M) – Kivikko – Kontula (M) – Kotikonnuntie (circular route)
94B	Kivikonlaita – Kontula (M)
95	Itäkeskus (M) – Mellunmäki (M) – Kontula (M) – Keinutie
96	Vuosaari (M) – Porslahdentie
97	Itäkeskus (M) – Vartiokylä – Mellunmäki (M)
97V	Itäkeskus (M) – Puotila – Vartioharjuntie – Mellunmäki (M)
98	Itäkeskus (M) – Marjaniemi – Rastila (M)

These lines begin operation at around 23:30 and end at around 02:00 (Mon-Fri) or 04:30 (Sat-Sun):

No.	Route
21N	Asema-aukio – Vattuniemi – Lauttasaari – Katajaharju
61N	Rautatientori – Pukinmäki – Töyrynummi
67N	Rautatientori – Metsälä – Paloheinä – Torpparinmäki (starts at 2:00)
73N	Rautatientori – Malmi – Puistola station – Ala-Tikkurila
74N	Rautatientori – Malmi – Tapanila – Puistola – Heikinlaakso
77N	Rautatientori – Arabia – Malmi – Jakomäki
78N	Rautatientori – Arabia – Viikki – Latokartano (until 0930 on weekends)
79N	Rautatientori – Malmi – Siltamäki – Puistola station
85N	Rautatientori – Herttoniemenranta – Yliskylä – Jollas
86N	Rautatientori – Kulosaari – Herttoniemi – Santahamina
90A	Rautatientori – Itäväylä – Vuosaari harbour
90N	Rautatientori – Itäväylä – Vuosaari (Kallvikintie)
92N	Rautatientori – Itäväylä – Myllypuro – Kivikko – Kontula (Keinutie)
94N	Rautatientori – Itäväylä – Roihuvuori – Kontulankaari
95N	Rautatientori – Itäväylä – Tammisalo – Marjaniemi – Mellunmäki – Länsimäki
96N	Rautatientori – Itäväylä – Aurinkolahti – Vuosaari (Porslahdentie)
97N	Rautatientori – Itäväylä – Puotila – Mellunmäki – Kotikonnuntie

=== Southern Espoo lines (100 series) ===
No.	Route
105	Lauttasaari (M) – Westend – Haukilahti - Olarinniitty - Mankkaa
111	Otaniemi – Tapiola (M) – Westend – Haukilahti – Matinkylä (M)
113	Tapiola (M) – Laajalahti – Perkkaa – Leppävaara
114	Matinkylä (M) – Urheilupuisto (M) – Mankkaa – Kilo – Leppävaara
118	Tapiola (M) – Orion - Suurpelto – Kuurinniitty – Espoon keskus
124	Tapiola (M) – Niittykumpu (M) – Olari - Suomenoja – Espoonlahti
125	Tapiola (M) – Niittykumpu (M) – Olari – Nöykkiö – Espoonlahti
133	Friisilä – Matinkylä (M) – Henttaa
145	Espoonlahti (M) – Soukka – Suvisaaristo
147	Espoonlahti (M) – Laurinlahti – Soukka
158	Matinkylä (M) – Nöykkiö – Kattilalaakso - Espoonlahti (M)
159	Matinkylä (M) – Suomenoja – Latokaski
162	Espoonlahti (M) – Kivenlahti – Saunalahti - Kauklahti - Valhalla
163	Espoonlahti (M) – Kivenlahti – Saunalahti – Kurttila
164	Kamppi – Länsiväylä – Maininki – Kivenlahti – Saunalahti – Kurttila (peak direction only)
164K	Kamppi – Länsiväylä – Maininki – Kiviruukki – Saunalahti – Tillinmäki (peak direction only)
165	Espoonlahti (M) – Kivenlahti – Saunalahti – Kurttila - Kauklahti - Vanttila
171	Matinkylä (M) – Länsiväylä – Sarvvik – Masala – Kirkkonummi – Kirkkonummi station
171B	Gesterby – Kirkkonummi – Kirkkonummi station (infrequent service)
171Z	Matinkylä (M) – Länsiväylä – Gesterby – Kirkkonummi – Kirkkonummi station (peak direction only)
172	Matinkylä (M) – Länsiväylä – Masala – Kirkkonummi – Kirkkonummi station – Kantvik (peak direction only)
173	Matinkylä (M) – Länsiväylä – Sarvvik - Masala – Kirkkonummi – Kirkkonummi station – Upinniemi (Monday-Saturday midday, evenings and Sundays only)
173Z	Matinkylä (M) – Länsiväylä – Kirkkonummi station – Upinniemi (Monday-Saturday only)
175	Matinkylä (M) – Länsiväylä – Masala – Jorvas station (peak direction only)
175V	Matinkylä (M) – Länsiväylä – Jorvas station (non-peak direction only)
181	Kirkkonummi station – Överby – Störsvik – Siuntio
181K	Kirkkonummi station – Överby – Böle – Störsvik – Siuntio
182	Kirkkonummi station – Munkinmäki – Länsiväylä – Siuntio
182A	Kirkkonummi station – Munkinmäki – Länsiväylä – Siuntio – Västerby (weekends only)

These lines begin operation at around 23:30 and end at around 02:00 (Mon-Fri) or 04:30 (Sat-Sun):

No.	Route
108N	Kamppi – Länsiväylä – Meilahti – Aalto University (M) – Otaniemi – Tapiola (M) – Westendinasema
112N	Kamppi – Länsiväylä – Lauttasaari (M) – Lauttasaari – Westend – Matinkylä (M) – Nuottaniemi – Tiistilä – Friisilänaukio
113N	Kamppi – Länsiväylä – Tapiola (M) – Laajalahti – Perkkaa – Leppävaara
114N	Kamppi – Länsiväylä – Tapiola (M) – Mankkaa – Kilo – Leppävaara
118N	Kamppi – Länsiväylä – Tapiola (M) – Suurpelto – Kauniainen – Jorvi
125N	Kamppi – Länsiväylä – Tapiola (M) – Niittykumpu – Olari – Latokaski
134N	Kamppi – Länsiväylä – Niittykumpu (M) – Olari – Pisa – Espoon keskus – Suvela – Tuomarila
146N	Kamppi – Länsiväylä – Suomenoja – Espoonlahti – Kivenlahti – Saunalahti
147N	Kamppi – Länsiväylä – Iivisniemi – Soukka – Espoonlahti – Kivenlahti
165N	Kamppi – Länsiväylä – Kivenlahti – Saunalahti – Kauklahti
173N	Kamppi – Länsiväylä – Sarvvik – Masala – Kirkkonummi – Kirkkonummi station – Upinniemi

=== Central & Northern Espoo lines (200 series) ===
No.	Route
201B	Leppävaara – Mäkkylä – Pitäjänmäki
202	Vermonniitty – Leppävaara – Helmipöllönmäki
203	Leppävaara – Uusmäki (weekdays only)
212	Kamppi – Meilahti – Laajalahti – Kauniainen
213	Kamppi – Meilahti – Suvela – Espoon keskus – Mikkelä – Kauklahti
214	Leppävaara – Karakallio – Rastaala – Jupperi
215	Leppävaara – Jupperi – Lähderanta
224	Leppävaara – Kauniainen – Espoon keskus – Tuomarila
225	Leppävaara – Karakallio – Viherlaakso – Lippajärvi – Högnäs
227	Leppävaara – Lippajärvi – Jorvi
236	Leppävaara – Viherlaakso – Vanhakartano – Kalajärvi – Lahnus (Serena)
236B	Leppävaara – Viherlaakso – Vanhakartano
236V	Leppävaara – Viherlaakso – Koskelo – Juvanmalmi – Kalajärvi – Lahnus (Serena)
239	Leppävaara – Viherlaakso – Perusmäki – Kalajärvi
243	Espoon keskus – Muurala – Kolmperä – Kolmiranta – Veikkola
243V	Espoon keskus – Muurala – Kolmperä – Veikkola
244	Espoon keskus – Nupuri – Brobacka – Siikaniemi
245	Espoon keskus – Nuuksionpää (October–May)
245A	Espoon keskus – Nuuksionpää – Kattila (May–October)
246	Espoon keskus – Oitaa – Kunnarla – Pakankylä – Röylä – Bodom – Kunnarla – Oitaa – Espoon keskus (circular route)
246K	Espoon keskus – Oitaa – Kellonummi – Kunnarla – Pakankylä – Röylä – Bodom – Kunnarla – Kellonummi – Oitaa – Espoon keskus (circular route)
246KT	Espoon keskus – Oitaa – Kellonummi – Kunnarla – Bodom – Röylä – Pakankylä – Kunnarla – Kellonummi – Oitaa – Espoon keskus (circular route)
246T	Espoon keskus – Oitaa – Kunnarla – Bodom – Röylä – Pakankylä – Kunnarla – Oitaa – Espoon keskus (circular route)

These lines begin operation at around 23:30 and end at around 02:00 (Mon-Fri) or 04:30 (Sat-Sun):

No.	Route
213N	Kamppi – Meilahti – Laajalahti – Sinimäki – Suvela – Espoon keskus (operates 19:15-00:00, Mon-Fri only)
231N	Elielinaukio – Leppävaara – Lintuvaara – Järvenperä
235N	Elielinaukio – Leppävaara – Karakallio – Viherlaakso – Muurala – Espoon keskus – Kuurinniitty

=== Western Vantaa/Northern Espoo regional lines (300 series) ===
No.	Route
311	Kaivoksela – Myyrmäki – Pähkinärinne – Hämeenkylä
321	Elielinaukio – Jupperi – Vanhakartano
322	Elielinaukio – Pähkinärinne – Hämeenkylä – Vantaankoski station
335	Linnainen – Hämevaara - Vapaala – Myyrmäki – Martinlaakso – Askisto
335B	Vapaala – Myyrmäki – Martinlaakso – Askisto
345	Elielinaukio – Kalajärvi – Rinnekoti
348	Rinnekoti – Röylä – Kalajärvi (school days only)
348BK	Hännikäinen – Lahnus – Kalajärvi (school holidays only)
348K	Rinnekoti – Lahnus – Hännikäinen – Rinnekoti (school days only)
349	Nemlahti – Perusmäki – Kalajärvi – Lahnus (Serena) – Hännikäinen – Lepsämänjoki (school days only)
349B	Kalajärvi – Lahnus (Serena) – Lepsämänjoki (school holidays only)
349BK	Kalajärvi – Lahnus (Serena) – Hännikäinen – Lepsämänjoki

These lines begin operation at around 23:30 and end at around 02:00 (Mon-Fri) or 04:30 (Sat-Sun):

No.	Route
321N	Elielinaukio – Lähderanta – Vanhakartano – Niipperi
345N	Elielinaukio – Pähkinärinne – Rinnekoti (also operates all day on weekends until August 2022)

=== Northern Vantaa lines (400 series) ===
No.	Route
431	Elielinaukio – Vantaanlaakso – Kivistö station
431B	Elielinaukio – Vantaanlaakso
433	Martinlaakso – Vantaanpuisto – Petas – Kivistö station
434	Kivistö station – Keimola
445	Kivistö station – Katriina hospital – Reuna

These lines begin operation at around 23:30 and end at around 02:00 (Mon-Fri) or 04:30 (Sat-Sun):

No.	Route
415N	Elielinaukio – Myyrmäki – Martinlaakso – Vantaanlaakso – Ylästö – Helsinki Airport
431N	Elielinaukio – Myyrmäki – Martinlaakso – Vantaanlaakso – Kivistö station
436N	Elielinaukio – Myyrmäki – Pähkinärinne – Niipperi – Kalajärvi

=== Crosstown lines (500 series) ===
No.	Route
502	Kallio – Meilahti – Munkkiniemi – Perkkaa – Leppävaara
506	Myllypuro (M) – Viikki – Kumpula – Pasila – Meilahti – Ruskeasuo
518	Ilmala – Pasila – Jakomäki – Hakunila – Kuninkaanmäki
522	Leppävaara – Hämevaara – Pähkinärinne – Vantaankoski station
522B	Leppävaara – Hämevaara
531	Tiistilä – Nuottaniemi – Matinkylä (M) – Olari – Pisa – Espoon keskus
533	Hyljelahti – Finnoo (M) – Matinkylä (M) – Suurpelto – Nihtisilta – Kauniainen – Järvenperä
542	Soukkanniemi – Espoonlahti – Maininki – Latokaski – Espoon keskus – Jorvi
544	Leppävaara station – Nihtisilta – Finnoo (M) Soukka – Espoonlahti – Kivenlahti
548	Tapiola (M) – Mankkaa – Kauniainen – Viherlaakso – Jupperi
549	Tapiola (M) – Mankkaa – Kauniainen – Jorvi
553	Hakunila – Malmi – Maunula – Ring I – Leppävaara station (weekdays only)
554	Itäkeskus (M) – Ring I – Pitäjänmäki – Leppävaara station – Tapiola (M) –Westendinasema
561	Itäkeskus (M) – Malmi – Aviapolis – Lapinkylä – Kivistö station
562	Itäkeskus (M) – Malmi – Suutarila – Vantaanportti – Aviapolis – Helsinki Airport
566	Martinlaakso station – Koskelo – Järvenperä – Espoon keskus
571	Tikkurila station – Ylästö – Martinlaakso – Myyrmäki station (until 1:30)
572	Mellunmäki (M) – Vaarala – Hakunila – Ring III – Vantaanportti – Tuupakka – Ring III – Martinlaakso station
574	Peijas – Ruskeasanta – Aviapolis – Ylästö – Myyrmäki station
576	Tikkurila station – Koivuhaka – Aviapolis – Katriina hospital – Kivistö station
582	Espoon keskus – Järvenperä – Niipperi – Kalajärvi
582V	Espoon keskus – Järvenperä – Juvanmalmi – Niipperi – Kalajärvi
583	Aviapolis – Martinlaakso – Louhela station – Pellas – Ring III – Niipperi – Perusmäki
583K	Aviapolis – Martinlaakso – Louhela station – Pellas – Askisto – Juvanmalmi – Perusmäki
584	Aviapolis – Martinlaakso – Louhela station – Pellas – Ring III – Niipperi – Kalajärvi
587	Mellunmäki (M) – Hakunila – Hakkila – Koivukylä station – Korso – Vierumäki
588	Länsisalmi – Ring III – Ojanko – Länsimäki – Rajakylä – Jakomäki – Vaarala – Hakunila – Itä-Hakkila – Sotunki – Sotungin koulu (school days only)
588B	Länsisalmi – Ring III – Ojanko – Länsimäki – Rajakylä – Jakomäki – Vaarala – Sotungin koulu (school days only)
576	Tikkurila station – Koivuhaka – Aviapolis – Katriina hospital – Kivistö station
582	Espoon keskus – Järvenperä – Niipperi – Kalajärvi
582V	Espoon keskus – Järvenperä – Juvanmalmi – Niipperi – Kalajärvi
583	Aviapolis – Martinlaakso – Louhela station – Pellas – Ring III – Niipperi – Perusmäki
583K	Aviapolis – Martinlaakso – Louhela station – Pellas – Askisto – Juvanmalmi – Perusmäki
584	Aviapolis – Martinlaakso – Louhela station – Pellas – Ring III – Niipperi – Kalajärvi
584T	Helsinge Skola – Martinlaakso – Louhela station – Pellas – Ring III – Niipperi – Kalajärvi (from Kalajärvi only, once per school morning)
587	Mellunmäki (M) – Hakunila – Hakkila – Koivukylä station – Korso – Vierumäki
588	Länsisalmi – Ring III – Ojanko – Länsimäki – Rajakylä – Jakomäki – Vaarala – Hakunila – Itä-Hakkila – Sotunki – Sotungin koulu (school days only)
588B	Länsisalmi – Ring III – Ojanko – Länsimäki – Rajakylä – Jakomäki – Vaarala – Sotungin koulu (school days only)

=== Central Vantaa lines (600 series) ===
No.	Route
611	Rautatientori – Käpylä – Siltamäki – Suutarila – Tikkurila
611B	Rautatientori – Käpylä – Siltamäki – Suutarila (peak direction only, during peak hours only)
614	Rautatientori – Tammisto – Ylästö
617	Hakaniemi – Tammisto – Aviapolis
619	Tikkurila – Hiekkaharju – Simonsilta
623	Hakaniemi – Koivuhaka – Leinelä – Peijas
624	Tikkurila – Ilola – Leinelä – Koivukylä – Päiväkumpu
631	Tikkurila – Koivukylä – Korso – Kulomäki (operates until 2:00 on weekends)
633	Hakaniemi – Ilola – Korso
641	Tikkurila – Simonkylä – Leinelä – Ilola – Tuusulanväylä – Hyrylä – Kilta – Kerava
642	Leinelä – Tuusulantie – Riihikallio – Lahela – Hyrylä
642K	Leinelä – Tuusulantie – Riihikallio – Ruotsinkylä – Lahela – Hyrylä
643	Hakaniemi – Tuusulanväylä – Tuusulantie – Hyrylä
665	Hyrylä – Järvenpää – Kellokoski – Hyökännummi
665A	Hyrylä – Järvenpää – Kellokoski – Hyökännummi – Mäntsälä (– Riihenmäki – Hepola)
665K	Hyrylä – Nummenkylä – Jampa – Järvenpää – Kellokoski – Hyökännummi

These lines start at 23:30 and operate every day of the week:

No.	Route
633N	Rautatientori – Tuusulanväylä – Viertola – Simonkylä – Leinelä – Korso – Savio – Sorsakorpi – Kerava
643N	Hakaniemi – Tuusulanväylä – Ilola – Riihikallio – Hyrylä – Lahela – Ruotsinkylä – Ilola – Tuusulanväylä – Hakaniemi (circular route)
665N	Rautatientori – Hyrylä – Järvenpää – Kellokoski – Hyökännummi

== Minibus lines ==
* means that the line is a neighbourhood line.

** All 914(T) services will run, if requested to do so, to the junction of Lappersintie and Ängsholmintie.

*** Certain 915A, B services will run, if requested to so, up Lieviöntie to the border with Lohja.

**** Certain 915B services will run, if requested to so, via Kahvimaa to the junction between Kavhimaantie and Kopulantie.

No.	Route
26	Ruoholahti (M) – Salmisaari
31	Pohjois-Haaga – Munkkivuori*
32	Pohjois-Haaga – Munkkivuori*
33	Munkkivuori – Tarvo*
34	Munkkivuori – Kaskisaari*
35	Niemenmäki – Munkkivuori – Rakuunantie*
36	Konala – Kannelmäki – Maununneva – Pirkkola*
116	Tapiola – Pohjois-Tapiola*
117	Tapiola – Aarnivalkea – Itäranta – Tapiola*
119	Tapiola – Suvikumpu – Tontounmäki – Niittykumpu (M)*
137	Matinkylä (M) – Matinkallio – Piispankylä – Kuitinmäki*
138	Matinkylä (M) – Nuottaniemi – Matinkallio*
148	Espoonlahti – Soukka – Iivisniemi*
149	Kivenlahti – Espoonlahti*
166	Lasilaakso – Kauklahti station – Vanttila
166K	Lasilaakso – Kauklahti station – Bassenkylä
167	Järvikylä – Kauklahti – Vanttila
168	Espoon keskus – Mikkelä – Kauklahti*
169	Espoon keskus – Suvela*
201	Leppävaara – Mäkkylä – Pitäjänmäki – Pajamäki*
207	Lintukorpi – Vallikallio – Etelä-Leppävaara*
229	Leppävaara – Viherlaakso*
232	Kirkkotie – Sepänkylä – Gallträsk – Kasavuori – Kirkkotie (Kauniainen, circular route, runs in both directions)*
241	Espoon keskus – Mikkelä – Hirvisuo
241	Espoon keskus – Hirvisuo
242	Espoon keskus – Bassenkylä
313	Pähkinärinne – Hämeenkylä – Varisto – Vapaala*
413	Martinlaakso – Myyrmäki station*
432	Martinlaakso – Kivistö – Kirkka
444	Kivistö station – Katriina hospital – Tapola – Suosaarentie – Riipilä
444T	Kivistö station – Katriina hospital – Tapola – Suosaarentie – Pirttiranta – Riipilä
446	Kivistö station – Koivupää – Katriina hospital – Kesäkylä
447	Kivistö station – Viininkanmetsä – Kesäkylä
603	Malmi – Oulunkylä – Käpylä – Maunula – Paloheinä*
625	Tikkurila station – Koivukylä – Peijas – Rekolanmäki*
701	Viikki – Pihlajamäki – Malmi – Suutarila – Siltamäki*
702	Jakomäki – Puistola – Malmi – Tapaninvainio – Savela*
704	Malmi – Sepänmäki*
713	(Kuninkaanmäki –) Hakunila – Vaarala*
713B	Kuninkaanmäki – Hakunila*
719	Hakunila – Nybygget
719B	Hakunila – Länsisalmi
719K	Hakunila – Länsisalmi – Nybygget
723	Päiväkumpu – Rekola – Havukoski – Koivukylä – Peijas*
802	Itäkeskus (M) – Roihuvuori – Herttoniemi (M) – Jollas*
805	Itäkeskus (M) – Mellunkylä – Myllypuro*
812	Mellunmäki (M) – Vesala – Kontula (M) – Myllypuro*
813	Vuosaari (M) – Lokitie – Kallvikintie – Pohjoinen ostoskeskus*
814	Vuosaari (M) – Koukkusaarentie*
815	Vuosaari (M) – Punakiventie – Porslahti – Isonvillasaarentie*
816	Vuosaari (M) – Ramsinniemi*
817	Vuosaari (M) – Kallahti*
818	Vuosaari (M) – Ruusuniemi – Vuosaari harbour – Mellunmäki (M)
912	Siuntio – Länsiväylä – Pikkala*
912K	Siuntio – Störsvik – Länsiväylä – Pikkala*
913A	Siuntio – Västerby – Karskog – Kela – Rånäs – Siuntio (circular route)*
913B	Siuntio – Rånäs – Kela – Karskog – Västerby – Siuntio (circular route)*
913BK	Karskog – Mastkärr (school days only)*
914	Siuntio – Siuntion kirkonkylä – Raivio – Siuntion kirkonkylä – Bocksintie*, **
914B	Siuntio – Siuntion kirkonkylä – Raivio*
914T	Siuntio – Västerby – Bocksintie*, **
915A	Siuntio – Myllykylä – Annila – Nyby – Siuntio*, ***
915B	Siuntio – Nyby – Annila – Myllykylä – Siuntio*, ***, ****
915T	Siuntio – Myllykylä – Kahvimaa*
916	Siuntio – Siuntion kirkonkylä – Suitia – Pauni*
917	Siuntio – Västerby – Munks – Bocksintie – Hästböle – Flyt – Västerby – Siuntio (circular route)*
994	Söderkulla – Immersby – Gumbostrand
994K	Söderkulla – Gumbostrand
996	Söderkulla – Box – Spjutsund – Kitö

== U lines ==
* means that the line is run in this direction only.

No.	Route
191	Kirkkonummi station (– Inkoo)
191A	Matinkylä (M) (– Inkoo)
192	(Inkoo station* / Karjaa / Tammisaari* –) Inkoo – Länsiväylä (– Kamppi)
192T	Kamppi – Lauttasaari (M) – Länsiväylä (– Inkoo – Barösund / Karjaa / Tammisaari)
192V	Kamppi – Lauttasaari – Länsiväylä (– Inkoo – Karjaa / – Tammisaari (– Bromarv))
193	(Karjaa – Inkoo –) Siuntio – Siuntion kirkonkylä – Uusikylä (– Lohja)
193B	(Karjaa – Inkoo –) Siuntio – Siuntion kirkonkylä*
193V	(Lohja – Virkkala –) Nysvidja – Lappers – Siuntio (– Inkoo – Karjaa)*
193VA	(Lohja – Virkkala –) Nysvidja – Lappers – Siuntion kirkonkylä – Raivio – Evitskog – Raivio – Siuntion kirkonkylä (– Inkoo – Karjaa)*
193VB	Lappers – Siuntio (– Inkoo – Karjaa)*
194V	Siuntio – Lappers – Nysvidja (– Virkkala – Lohja)
194VK	(Lohja – Virkkala –) Nysvidja – Lappers – Siuntion kirkonkylä – Raivio – Siuntion kirkonkylä – Siuntio*
194VT	(Lohja – Virkkala –) Nysvidja – Lappers – Siuntion kirkonkylä – Raivio – Evitskog – Raivio – Siuntion kirkonkylä – Siuntio*
195	(Lohja – Virkkala –) Nysvidja – Lappers – Siuntion kirkonkylä – Siuntio – Pikkalan tehdas – Böle*
275	Leppävaara – Turunväylä – Veikkola (– Lohja / Nummela / Vihti / Karkkila)
280	Kamppi – Turunväylä – Veikkola (– Lohja / Nummela / Vihti / Karkkila)
346	Kamppi – Kalajärvi (– Vihti / Karkkila)
375	Myyrmäki – Martinlaakso – Kalajärvi – Otalampi – Vihti
375V	Myyrmäki – Pähkinärinne – Kalajärvi – Otalampi – Vihti
453	Kamppi – Keimola – Luhtaanmäki (– Klaukkala – Lepsämä)
455(B)	Kamppi – Keimola – Luhtaanmäki (– Klaukkala)
455A	Kamppi – Keimola – Luhtaanmäki (– Klaukkala – Mäntysalo)
456	Kamppi – Keimola – Luhtaanmäki (– Klaukkala – Nurmijärvi)
456A, AB, AN, N, R, RN	Kamppi – Keimola – Luhtaanmäki (– Klaukkala – Rajamäki)
457	Kamppi – Keimola – Luhtaanmäki (– Klaukkala – Röykkä – Nurmijärvi)
457A	Kamppi – Keimola – Luhtaanmäki (– Klaukkala – Röykkä – Rajamäki)
457B	Kamppi – Keimola – Luhtaanmäki (– Klaukkala – Röykkä)
459	Kamppi – Keimola – Luhtaanmäki (– Klaukkala – Loppi)
465	Kamppi – Keimola – Syväoja (– Nurmijärvi – Rajamäki)
465A	Kamppi – Keimola – Syväoja (– Nurmijärvi – Kiljava)
465B	Kamppi – Keimola – Syväoja (– Nurmijärvi)
848	Kamppi – Pasila – Viikki – Söderkulla – Porvoo (runs until 1:30)
999	Tikkurila – Söderkulla – Porvoo

== Trunk lines ==
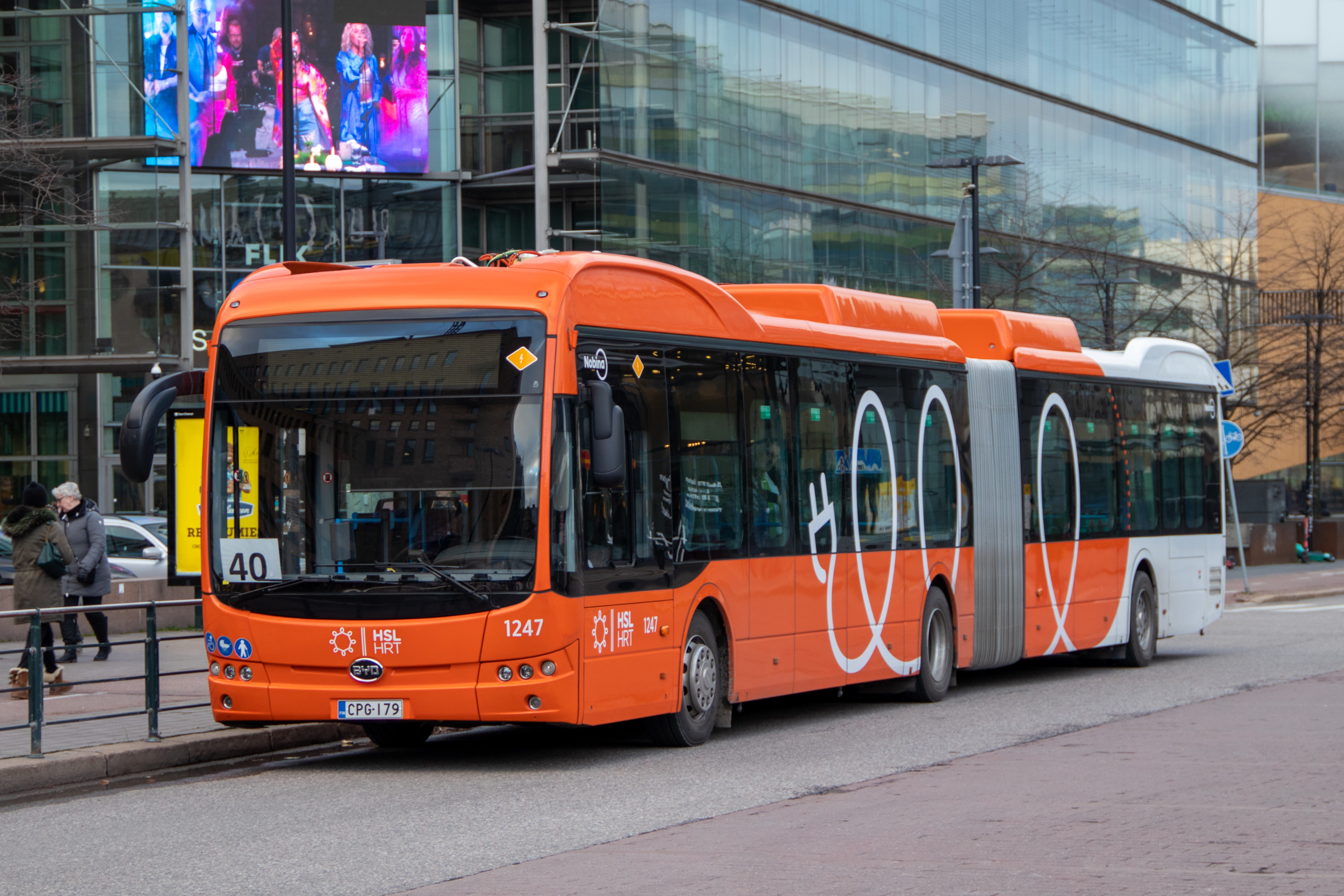
A BYD K11U electric bus on trunk line 40 at Elielinaukio in central Helsinki. On the right is the cable and plug symbol, this denotes that it is a fully electric bus.

No.	Previously No.	Route	Hours of operation
20	18	Eira – Kamppi – Munkkivuori	Mon-Thu: 05:15-02:00 Fri: 05:15-04:30 Sat: 05:00-04:30 Sun: 05:45-02:00
30	39	Eira – Kamppi – Munkkivuori – Myyrmäki	Mon-Thu: 04:45-02:30 Fri: 04:45-05:00 Sat: 04:30-05:00 Sun: 05:15-02:30
40	40	Elielinaukio – Haaga – Kannelmäki	Mon-Thu: 05:00-02:30 Fri: 05:00-05:00 Sat: 05:15-05:00 Sun: 05:45-02:30
200	235	Elielinaukio – Pitäjänmäki – Leppävaara – Karakallio – Jorvi – Espoon keskus	Mon-Sun: 05:00-00:00
300	New	Elielinaukio – Vihdintie – Myyrmäki station	Mon-Thu: 05:15-01:15 Fri: 05:15-04:45 Sat: 05:15-04:45 Sun: 05:30-00:45
400	New	Elielinaukio – Hämeenlinnanväylä – Myyrmäki – Martinlaakso – Vantaankoski station	Mon-Fri: 05:00-00:00 Sat-Sun: 05:30-00:00
500	58	Itäkeskus (M) – Pasila – Munkkivuori	Mon-Fri: 05:00-00:00 Sat-Sun: 06:00-00:30
510	551	Herttoniemi (M) – Pasila – Meilahti – Tapiola (M) – Länsiväylä - Espoonlahti (M) - Kivenlahti (M)	Mon-Fri: 05:00-00:15 Sat: 05:15-00:15 Sun: 06:15-00:15
520	531B, 555	Matinkylä (M) – Tiistilä – Matinkylä (M) – Olari – Suurpelto – Leppävaara – Uusmäki – Myyrmäki - Martinlaakso station	Mon-Sat: 04:45-02:15 Sun: 05:30-02:15
530	565	Matinkylä (M) – Finnoo (M) – Pisa – Espoon keskus – Jorvi – Lippajärvi – Lähderanta – Linnainen – Myyrmäki station	Mon-Fri: 04:30-02:15 Sat: 04:45-02:15 Sun: 05:30-02:15
560	New	Rastila (M) – Vuosaari (M) – Mellunmäki (M) – Kontula (M) – Malmi – Myyrmäki	Mon-Thu: 04:30-02:15 Fri: 04:30-02:45 Sat: 04:45-02:45 Sun: 05:00-02:15
570	562	Mellunmäki (M) – Hakunila – Tikkurila – Aviapolis – Helsinki Airport	Mon-Sun: 24h
600	615	Rautatientori – Tuusulanväylä – Kartanonkoski – Helsinki Airport	From Rautatientori: Mon-Sun: 24h To Rautatientori: Mon-Sun: 05:00-04:00

== Depots ==
Only buses used regularly in HSL traffic are counted.

- Espoo
  - Finnoonniitty (ca. 45 buses, Pohjolan Liikenne)
  - Suomenoja (ca. 75 buses, Pohjolan Liikenne)
  - Klovi (ca. 200 buses, Nobina Finland)
- Helsinki
  - Ruskeasuo (Ruha) (ca. 300 buses, Koiviston Auto Helsinki)
  - Vartiokylä (Varha) (ca. 50 buses, Koiviston Auto Helsinki)
  - Ilmala (ca. 200 buses, Pohjolan Liikenne)
  - Roihupelto (ca. 65 buses, Nobina Finland)
  - Tattarisuo (ca. 40 buses, Tammelundin Liikenne)
- Vantaa
  - Kaivoksela (2 buses, Reissu Ruoti)
  - Ojanko (ca. 200 buses, Koiviston Auto Helsinki)
  - Rajatorppa (ca. 60 buses, Nobina Finland)
- Kerava
  - Jäspilä (ca. 35 buses, Pohjolan Liikenne)
