= Suur-Leppävaara =

Suur-Leppävaara Stor-Alberga
- District of Espoo
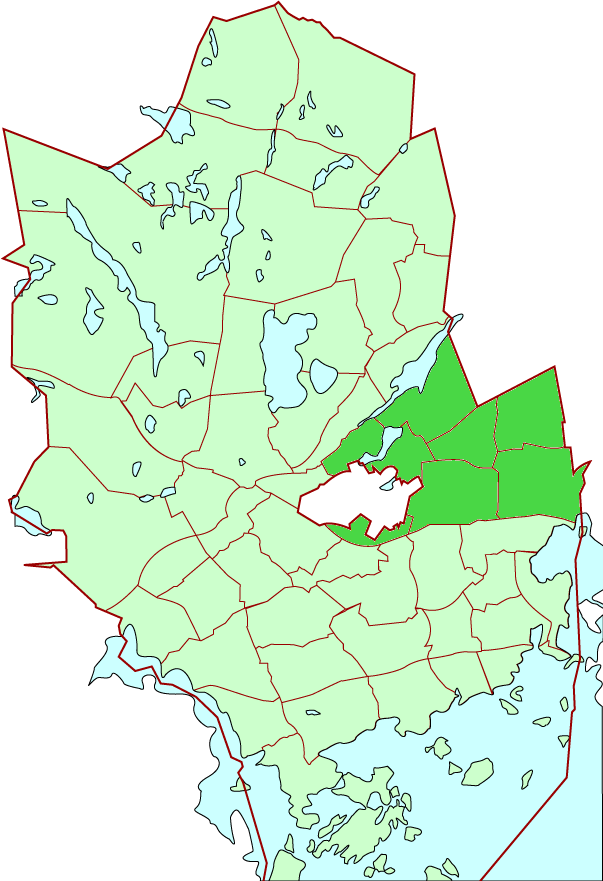
- Location of Suur-Leppävaara within Espoo
- Coordinates: 60.23°N 24.75°E
- Country: Finland
- Municipality: Espoo
- Region: Uusimaa
- Sub-region: Greater Helsinki
- Main District: Suur-Leppävaara

Population (31.12.2018)
  - Total: 69,505

Languages
  - Finnish: 87 %
  - Swedish: 6.6 %
  - Other: 6.3 %

Suur-Leppävaara (Finnish) or Stor-Alberga (Swedish) is an eastern main district of Espoo, a city in Finland.

It contains the districts Karakallio, Kilo, Laaksolahti, Leppävaara, Lintuvaara, Lippajärvi, Sepänkylä, Viherlaakso.

== See also ==
- Districts of Espoo
