= Frank Zoko Ble =

Finnish karateka

Frank Zoko Ble or Zoko Blé Franck (born 1975) is an ex-karateka of Ivorian-Finnish nationality. During his career he represented both the Ivory Coast and Finland at a national team level. After his sports career Zoko Ble worked as an electrical engineer in Espoo, and was also a visiting researcher and doctoral student of the Aalto University.

In July 2016, the District Court of Espoo sentenced Zoko Ble to life imprisonment for the murder of his 35-year-old Ivorian wife, whom he stabbed to death with a knife in May 2015 in their joint apartment in Mankkaa. The motive for the act was jealousy and the odd thoughts of the wife's discriminating temperament. The couple's two-year-old daughter was also present at the murder, but was unharmed. Zoko Ble also has children from an earlier marriage to a Finn.

== Achievements ==
- Finland Cup Finals 2007.
- Finland's International Open Silver 2007.
- Finnish Championship Semi-Finals 2008.
- Budo Cup Quarterfinals 2008.
