= Finnoo =

Area in Espoo, Finland

Coordinates: 60°09′31″N 24°42′47″E

Finnoo (previously known as Suomenoja, Swedish: Finno) is a neighbourhood in the districts of Kaitaa and Nöykkiö in Espoo, Finland, along the Länsiväylä highway.

== History ==
According to pollen analysis, the earliest farming settlements in Finland were in Finnoo in the early 11th century. The Swedish population spread into the area during the Swedish colonisation of Finland in the Middle Ages.

The Swedish name Finno comes from the word Finnevik, meaning "bay of the Finns". The name was possibly given by colonists from Sweden who settled in the eastern neighbouring village of Gräsa. The bay has also given its name to a stream running into it from the northwest, Finnå.

== Construction in the 2020s ==
There are plans for apartments for 17 thousand people and 1800 new jobs in the Finnoo area. The area is meant to be a precursor for modern urban building. Construction and transport is directed to low-emission and durable forms. Construction of apartments began in spring 2020. The area is meant to be mostly finished in the 2030s.

Apartment buildings are being constructed in four different areas: the metro centre, Djupsundsbäcken, Finnoonsatama and Finnoonkartano in the north. The area will include apartments to be owned, housing cooperatives and rental apartments. There will also be several schools and a kindergarten in the area.

== Transport ==
The Finnoo metro station of the extension of Länsimetro is located in the centre of Finnoo. The station opened in December 2022.

During the construction of the new residential area Finnoo will also gain many new streets and bridges. Parking has been concentrated into parking buildings, because of which parking in the area will be handled with roofed parking spaces and parking along the streets.

== Nature ==
There are several parks planned in the Finnoo area, as well as marine walking routes, an extensive bicycle path network and services within walking distance. To protect the natural values of the area there will be clear paths and spots for recreation.

There is a harbour for small boats in Finnoo, and in summer time archipelago ships stop at the harbour, allowing access to the numerous outdoor islands in the city.

There is a valuable spot for birds in the area, popular with ornithologists throughout the country. The Finnoo nature paths and bird watching towers are popular targets for leisure hiking. The area has a connection to the Espoo central park and to the Rantaraitti hiking rail, which is tens of kilometres long.
