= Perkkaa =

Coordinates: 60°12′57.27″N 24°49′20.5″E

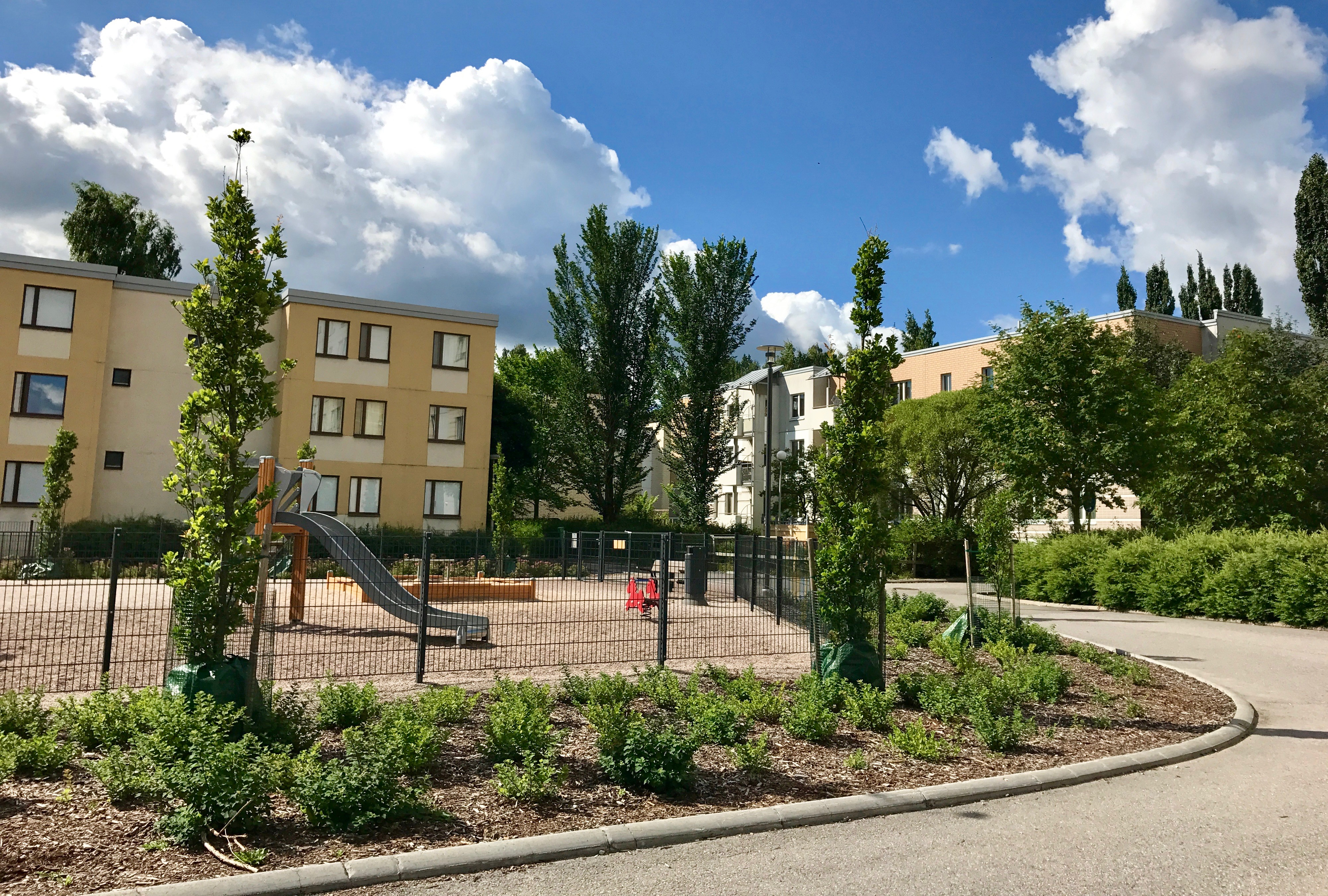
A view of Perkkaa

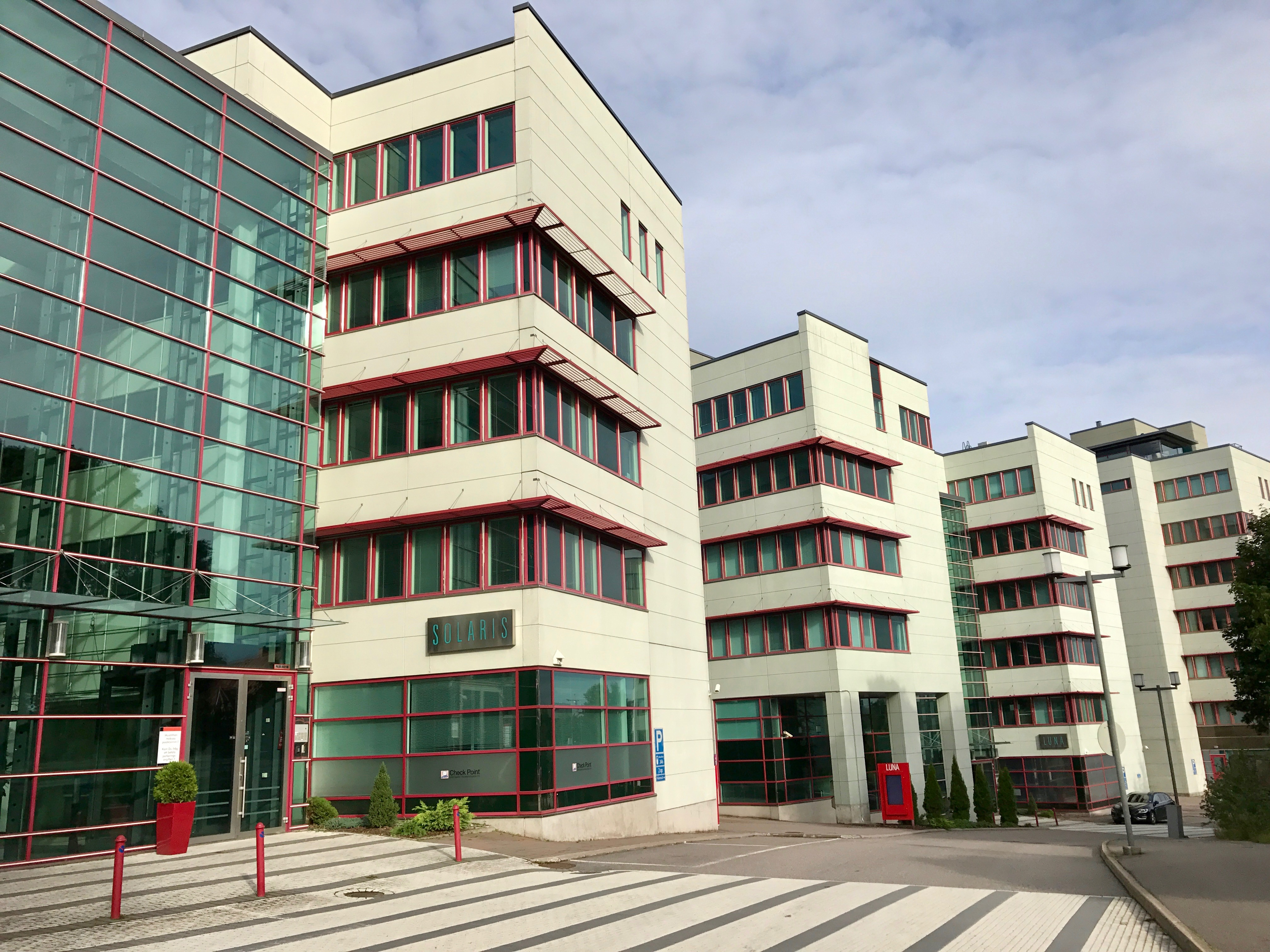
The Stella Business Park

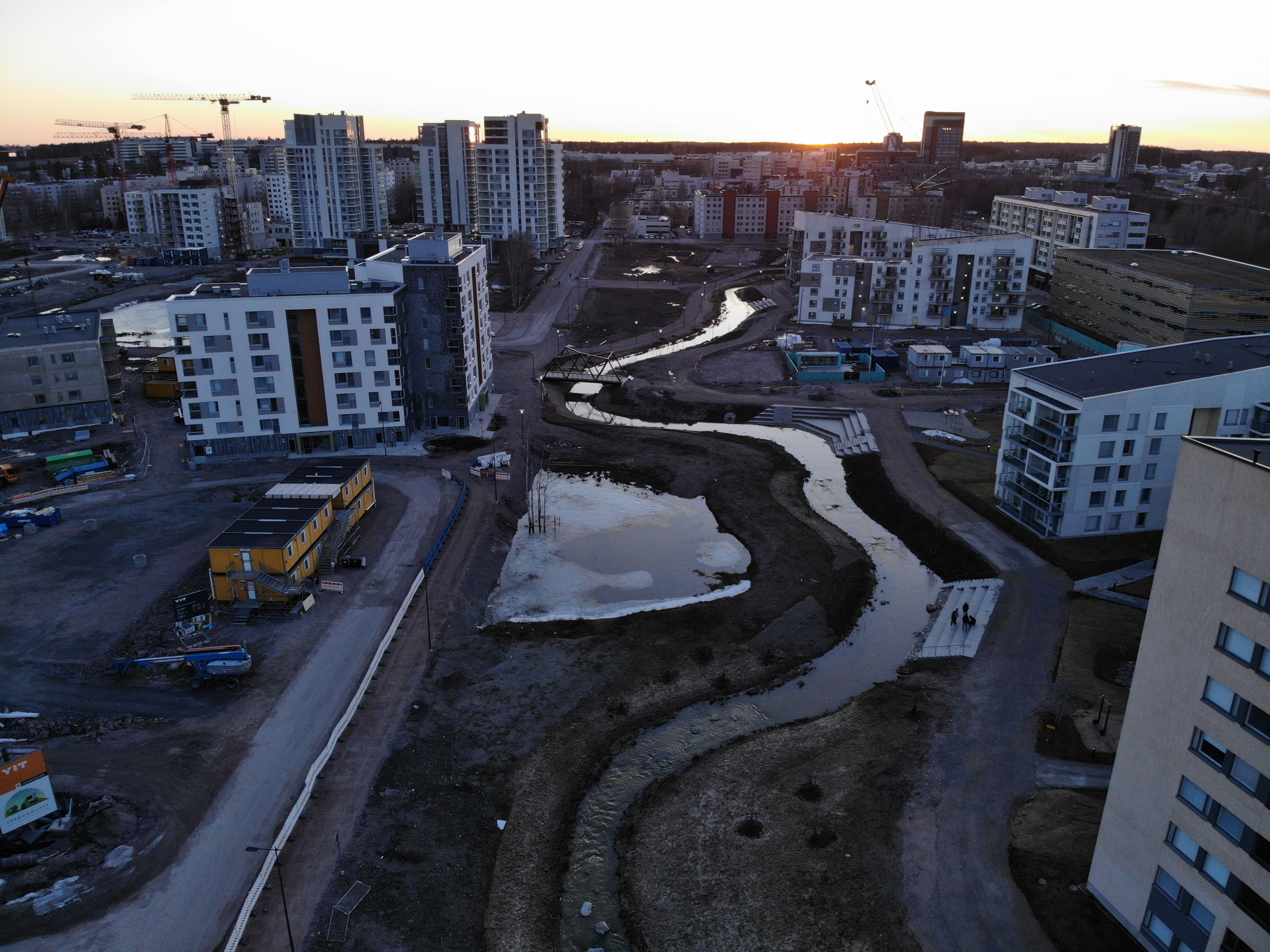
New apartments in Vermonniitty

Perkkaa (Swedish: Bergans) is a neighbourhood in the district of Leppävaara in Espoo, Finland. On New Year, 2017, the population of the neighbourhood was 3,836. The name of the neighbourhood comes from the Bergans farm that used to be located in the area. Perkkaa is located inside the Kehä I beltway, bordering the beltway to the west, the Rantarata train line to the north, the district of Pitäjänmäki in Helsinki to the east and the Finnish national road 1 to the south.

Services in Perkkaa include a school, a university of applied sciences, a citizens' park and many kindergartens. The area also has a grocery store. As well as residential houses, Perkkaa includes office buildings such as the Stella Business Park, the Polaris Business Park and the Upseerin avec office building. The Vermo race track is also located in Perkkaa.

The streets in Perkkaa are named after military terms, including for example military ranks from colonel to sergeant.

Most of the apartments in Perkkaa were built in the 1970s and 1990s. Most of the apartments are located in multi-story apartment buildings.

== Transport connections ==
The Espoo internal bus lines 113 and 202 as well as the regional bus lines 113N, 212, 213N and 502 travel through Perkkaa.

The Leppävaara railway station and the Mäkkylä railway station are within walking distance from Perkkaa.
