= Hämevaara =

Hämevaara Tavastberga
- City District
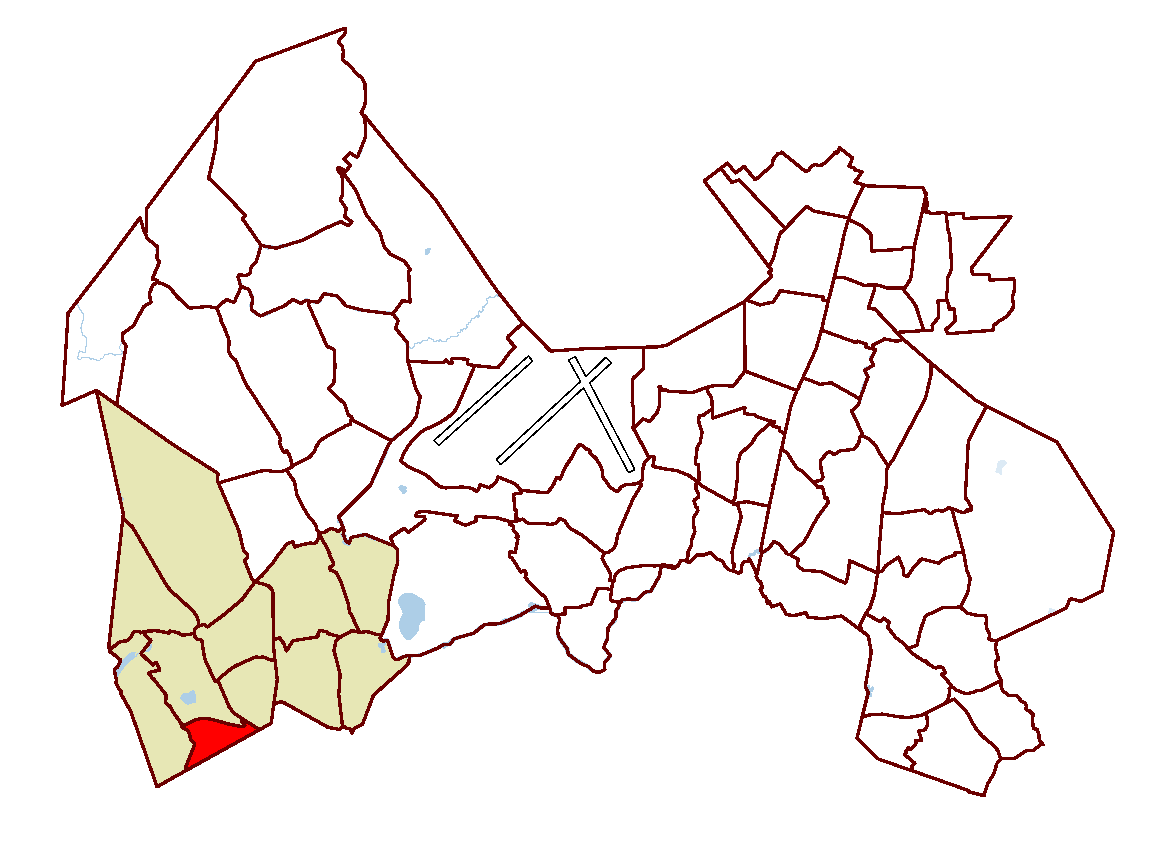
- Location on the map of Vantaa
- Coordinates: 60°15′00″N 24°48′00″E
- Country: Finland
- City: Vantaa
- Major region: Myyrmäki

Population (1.1.2014)
  - Total: 1,327
- Time zone: GMT +2
- Postal Code(s): 01640
- Website: web.archive.org/web/20150206121229/http://www.vantaa.fi:80/frontpage

Hämevaara (Swedish: Tavastberga) is a city district of the municipality of Vantaa, Finland. It is located in western Vantaa, near the border of the municipality of Espoo. The district has an area of roughly one square kilometer and a population of 1,327 (2014).

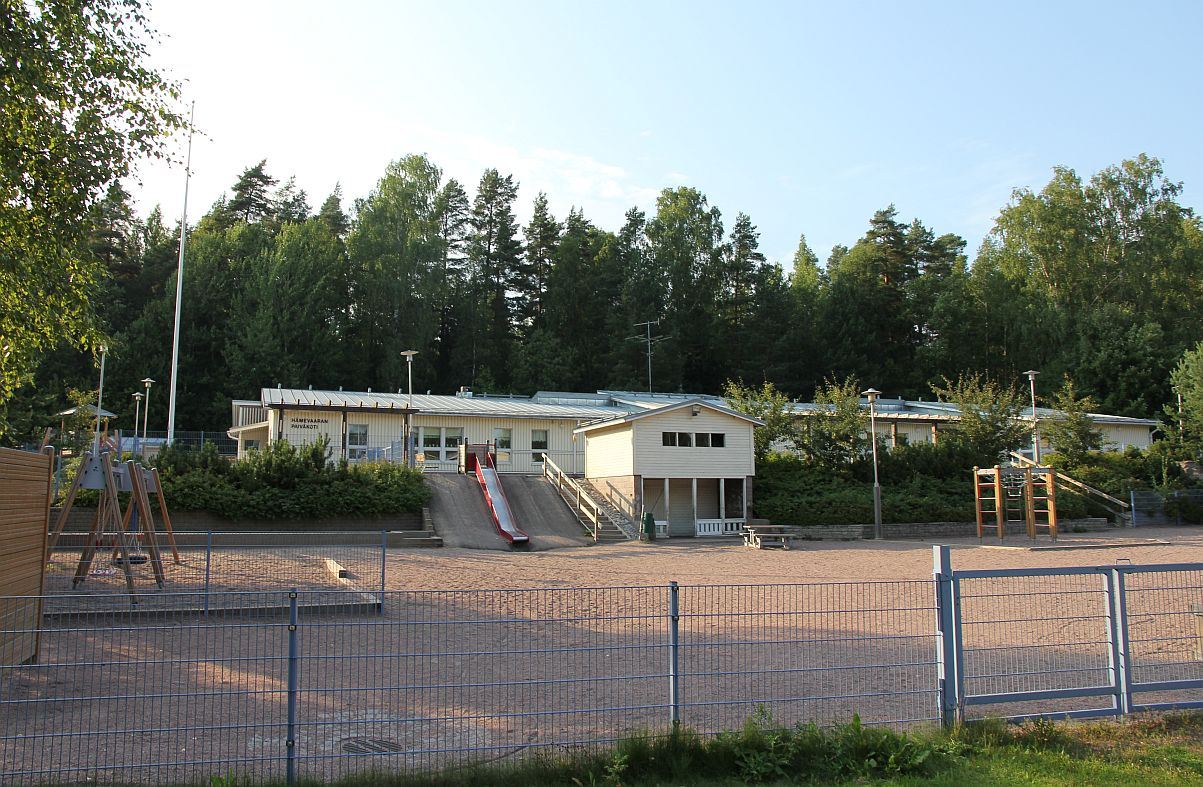
Hämevaara Daycare

Hämevaara serves primarily as a suburb of the Helsinki area, consisting mostly of owner-occupied separate and terraced houses. It also hosts an electric beacon for air traffic in and around Helsinki.
