= Söderkulla =

Village in Sipoo, Finland

Coordinates: 60°18′02″N 25°19′32″E

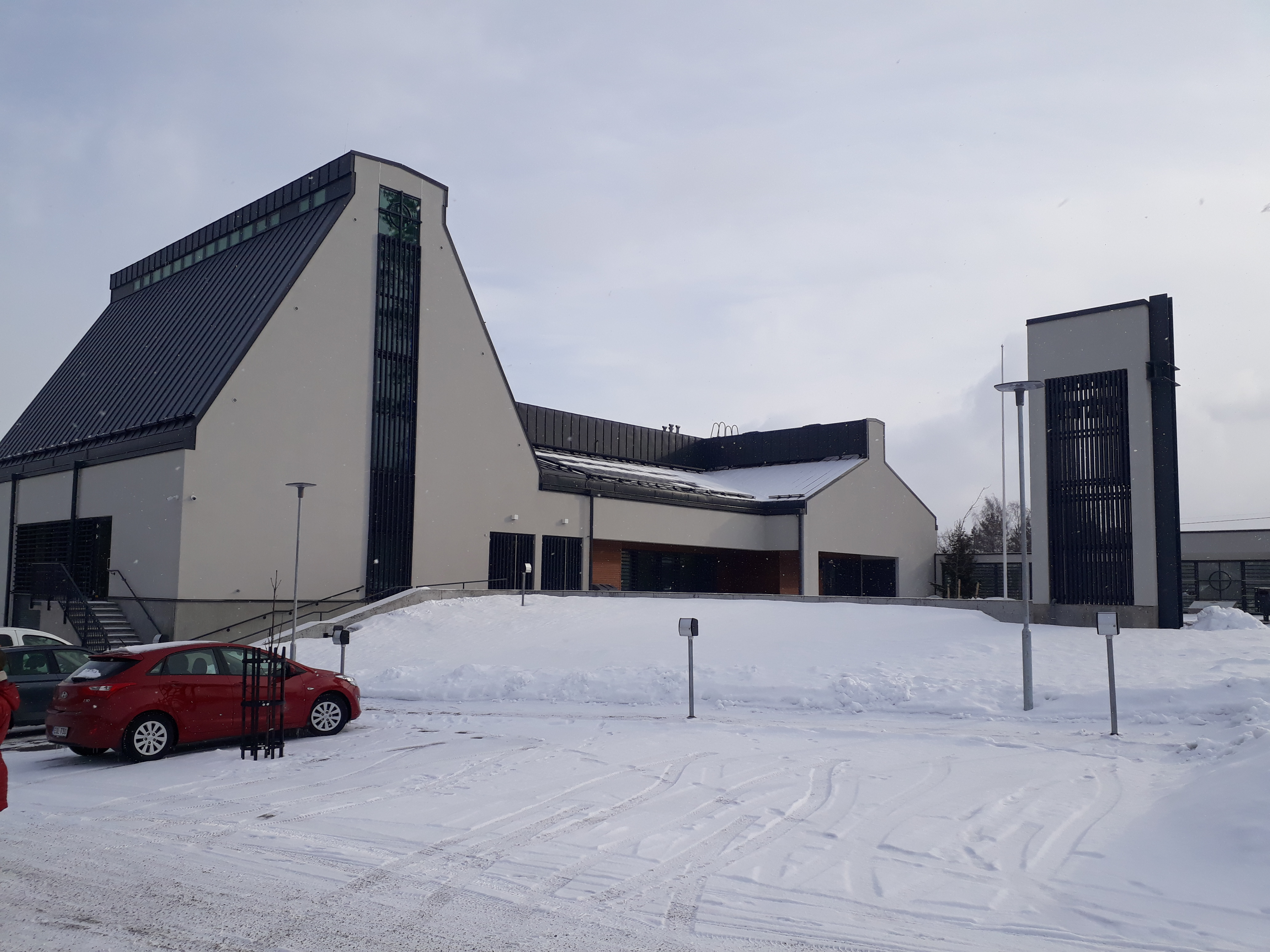
Söderkulla Church

Söderkulla (Swedish pronunciation: [ˈsøːdərˌkulːɑ]; literally meaning the "south hill") is a village in the southern part of the Sipoo municipality in Uusimaa, Finland. It is located along the Regional road 170 and the Porvoo Highway (E18), and about 10 kilometres (6.2 mi) north of Söderkulla is Nikkilä, the administrative center of Sipoo. The distance to the center of Helsinki from Söderkulla is about 30 kilometres (19 mi) and to the center of Porvoo about 24 kilometres (15 mi). Söderkulla has one of Sipoo's significant growth centers alongside Nikkilä; at the end of 2017, Söderkulla had a population of 3,782. In the zoning, the construction of the municipality will continue to be emphasized in these areas. Among other things, the construction of a 3,000 square meter shopping center has been approved near the center of Söderkulla.

Söderkulla has comprehensive basic services. A few hundred meters apart are a health center, a dental clinic, Alko, a pharmacy, the Linda's service center for the elderly, a gym, R-kioski, a library, three grocery stores (such as K-Supermarket), a kindergarten and the South Sipoo School. In connection with primary school, there is also a Swedish-language Söderkulla skolan. In 2018, Söderkulla Church, designed by Juhani Aalto, was completed in Söderkulla and also as a parish center with study rooms, club rooms and a youth center. The church is used by both the Finnish and Swedish parishes in Sipoo. The building utilizes geothermal and solar energy.

Söderkulla is also home to Söderkulla Manor, which was founded in 1557. The current Art Nouveau-styled manor house was designed by Karl Lindahl and was completed in 1908. The manor estate is owned by the municipality of Sipoo, and its main building has previously been leased to a bespoke restaurant entrepreneur. In the spring of 2011, the municipality planned to sell the manor, which was frowned upon. The sale intentions were canceled, and the manor will become a center of cultural services, where the municipality's activities in the courtyard buildings are now planned.
