= Suvisaaristo =

Suvisaaristo Sommaröarna
- District of Espoo
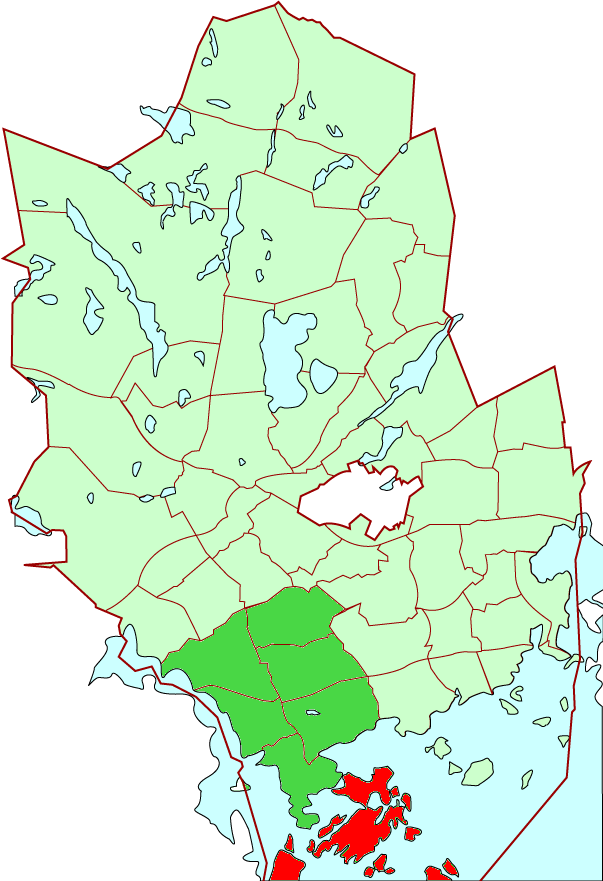
- Location of Suvisaaristo within Espoo
- Coordinates: 60°07′N 24°43′E
- Country: Finland
- Municipality: Espoo
- Region: Uusimaa
- Sub-region: Greater Helsinki
- Main District: Suur-Espoonlahti
- Inner District(s): Bergö, Furuholm, Kopplorna, Lehtisaaret, Lilla Pentala, Moisö, Pentala, Ramsö, Skataholmen, Stora Bodö, Svartholmen, Svinö

Population (2006)
  - Total: 566

Languages
  - Finnish: 63.6 %
  - Swedish: 35.2 %
  - Other: 1.2 %
- Jobs: 57

Suvisaaristo (Finnish) or Sommaröarna (Swedish) is a maritime district in Espoo, Finland, district number 451, and an archipelago in the Gulf of Finland, off the coast of Soukka, in the southwestern part of Espoo.

The Uusimaa region council chose Suvisaaristo as the Uusimaa Village of the Year in 2007.

== Islands ==
=== Islands with a road connection ===
- Bergö
- Furuholm
- Moisö
- Ramsö
- Skataholmen
- Svartholm
- Suino (Svinö)

=== Other islands ===
The archipelago also includes about forty islands without a road connection, for example Alskär.
