= Vierumäki (Vantaa) =

City district in Vantaa, Finland

Vierumäki is a district in the major region of Korso in Vantaa, Finland. On January 1, 2016, there were 1,426 inhabitants in Vierumäki. The district is bordered by the districts of Korso and Vallinoja and the municipality of Tuusula.

Vierumäki is one of the safest neighbourhoods in the capital region.
