= Veräjämäki =

Coordinates: 60°14′N 24°59′E

Veräjämäki (in Finnish) Grindbacka (in Swedish)
- Neighborhood of Helsinki
- Interactive map of Veräjämäki (in Finnish); Grindbacka (in Swedish)
- Country: Finland
- Province: Southern Finland
- Region: Uusimaa
- Sub-region: Helsinki
- Time zone: UTC+2 (EET)
  - Summer (DST): UTC+3 (EEST)

Veräjämäki (Finnish) or Grindbacka (Swedish) is a neighborhood of Helsinki, Finland.
