= Pähkinärinne =

Suburb in Western Vantaa, Finland

Coordinates: 60°15.5′N 24°48.2′E

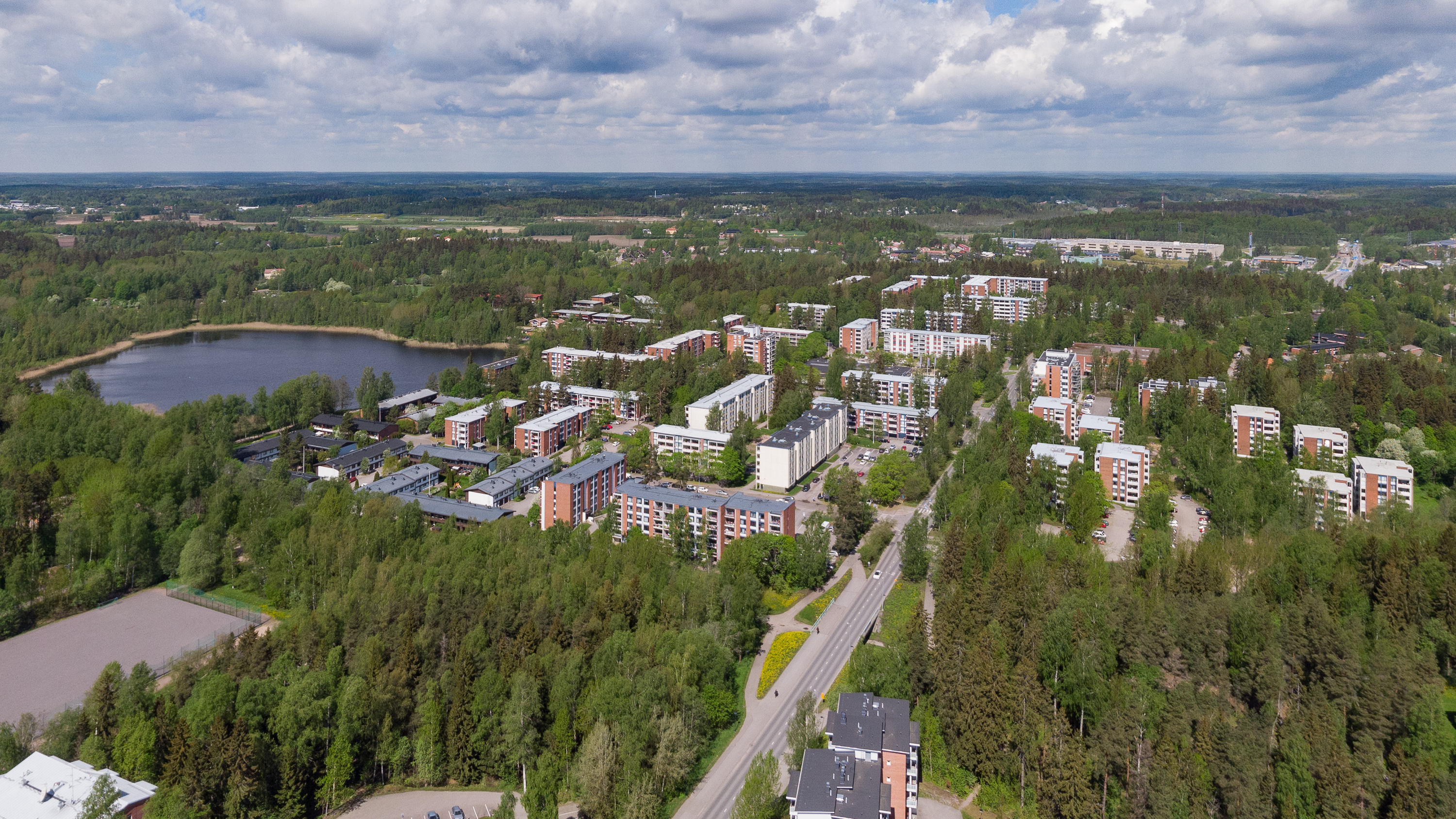
Old part of Pähkinärinne from air.

Pähkinärinne (Hasselbacken in Swedish) is a suburb in Western Vantaa, in Finland. It lies roughly between a pond named Lammaslampi and Vihdintie, former Helsinki-Pori main road. It lies near the border between Vantaa and both Helsinki and Espoo.There are basic services, for example, a comprehensive school for students from 1st to 6th forms, in Pähkinärinne. Pähkinärinne neighbours Hämeenvaara, Hämeenkylä, Linnainen, Rajatorppa and Varisto.

Pähkinärinne is built in an area of beautiful nature, with the landmark being the pond, Lammaslampi. Lammaslampi is surrounded by well maintained path, and is thus a popular local destination for outdoor recreational activities.

There are two grocery stores in Pähkinärinne. Around both. In these areas there are also a few bars, a pizza restaurant and two hair salons.

A large part of the buildings in Pähkinärinne were built by Tapiola.

The postal code for Pähkinärinne is 01710.

== See also ==
- Districts of Vantaa
- Myyrmäki
