= Nordic Aluminium =

Finnish aluminium producer

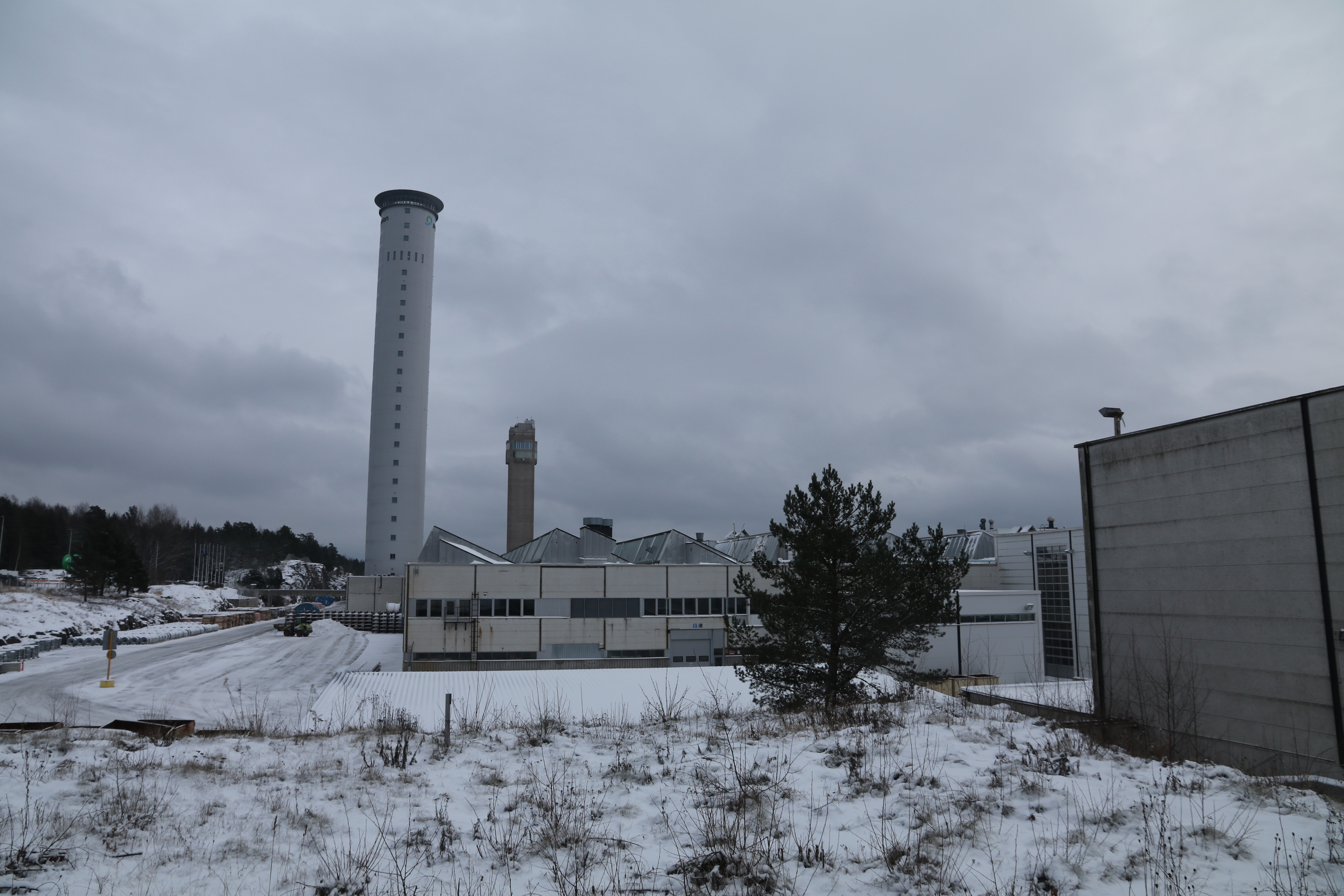
- Nordic Aluminium factory in Kirkkonummi
- Industry: Aluminium products
- Predecessor: Nokia Aluminium
- Founded: 1962; 64 years ago
- Headquarters: Kaapelitie 68, Pickala, Finland
- Parent: Lival
- Website: Official website

Nordic Aluminium (Nasdaq Helsinki: NOA1V) is a Finnish aluminium producer. Its shares were listed on Helsinki Stock Exchange from 1997 until 2012.

Nordic Aluminium is the manufacturer of GLOBAL Trac track lighting.

== History ==
Nordic Aluminium was founded in 1962, when the Finnish Cable Works began manufacturing aluminium extrusions at its Pickala factory in Kirkkonummi. In its early years, the business produced machined parts for power-line pylons and aluminium cable ladders, and it later developed electrotechnical products including an early three-phase lighting track system. After the 1966 merger that formed Nokia, the operation became known as Nokia Aluminium.

The aluminium profile business was incorporated as Nokia Aluminium Ltd in 1990. The company adopted the name Nordic Aluminium Ltd in 1996 and was listed on the Helsinki Stock Exchange in 1997.

In 2012, Oy Lival Ab increased its holding to more than 90 percent through a public takeover bid and started redemption proceedings for the remaining shares, leading to Nordic Aluminium's delisting from the Helsinki stock exchange later that year.

== Global Trac lighting ==
GLOBAL Trac is a lighting track system by Nordic Aluminium, available in both single and three phase versions. According to the manufacturer GLOBAL Trac Pro is the most sold three-phase lighting track system in the world.

Nordic Aluminium was founded as Nokia Aluminium in 1962. Lighting tracks were manufactured under Nokia's brand up until 1996 when Nordic Aluminium got its current name.
