= Störsvik =

- Village
- Location in Finland
- Coordinates: 60°4′N 24°17′E
- Country: Finland
- Region: Uusimaa
- Municipality: Siuntio

Area
  - Total: 1.42 km^{2} (0.55 sq mi)

Population (2017)
  - Total: 268
- Time zone: UTC+2 (EET)
  - Summer (DST): UTC+3 (EEST)

Störsvik is a village located in the southern part of Siuntio municipality, about 10 kilometres (6.2 mi) south of the Siuntio Station Area. It has a population of about 268 (2017).
