= Töyrynummi =

Töyrynummi Lidamalmen (in Swedish)
- Neighborhood of Helsinki
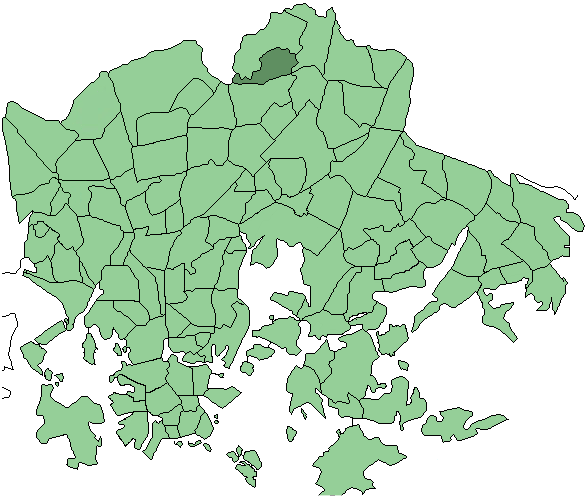
- Location in Helsinki
- Coordinates: 60°16′15″N 25°00′13″E
- Country: Finland
- Province: Southern Finland
- Region: Uusimaa
- Sub-region: Helsinki
- Time zone: UTC+2 (EET)
  - Summer (DST): UTC+3 (EEST)

Töyrynummi (Swedish: Lidamalmen) is a northern neighborhood of Helsinki, Finland.

It is a low-income housing area with 2,200 residents as of 2018.

== Politics ==
Results of the 2011 Finnish parliamentary election in Töyrynummi:

- National Coalition Party 25.0%
- Social Democratic Party 23.3%
- True Finns 19.2%
- Green League 11.4%
- Left Alliance 7.6%
- Centre Party 5.6%
- Christian Democrats 3.2%
- Swedish People's Party 2.1%
