= Pakankylä =

Village in Uusimaa, Finland

Coordinates: 60.284°N 24.677°E

Pakankylä is a village in the city of Espoo, Finland. The village lies near the Nuuksio National Park and just north of Lake Bodom, the largest lake in Espoo. The village has about 15 houses.

Mainly agricultural, the village nowadays also serves as a vacation destination as Pakankylä has its own spa hotel, Kaisankoti. The Espoo Car Museum is also located in Pakankylä.
