= Pohjolan Liikenne =

Finnish road transport company

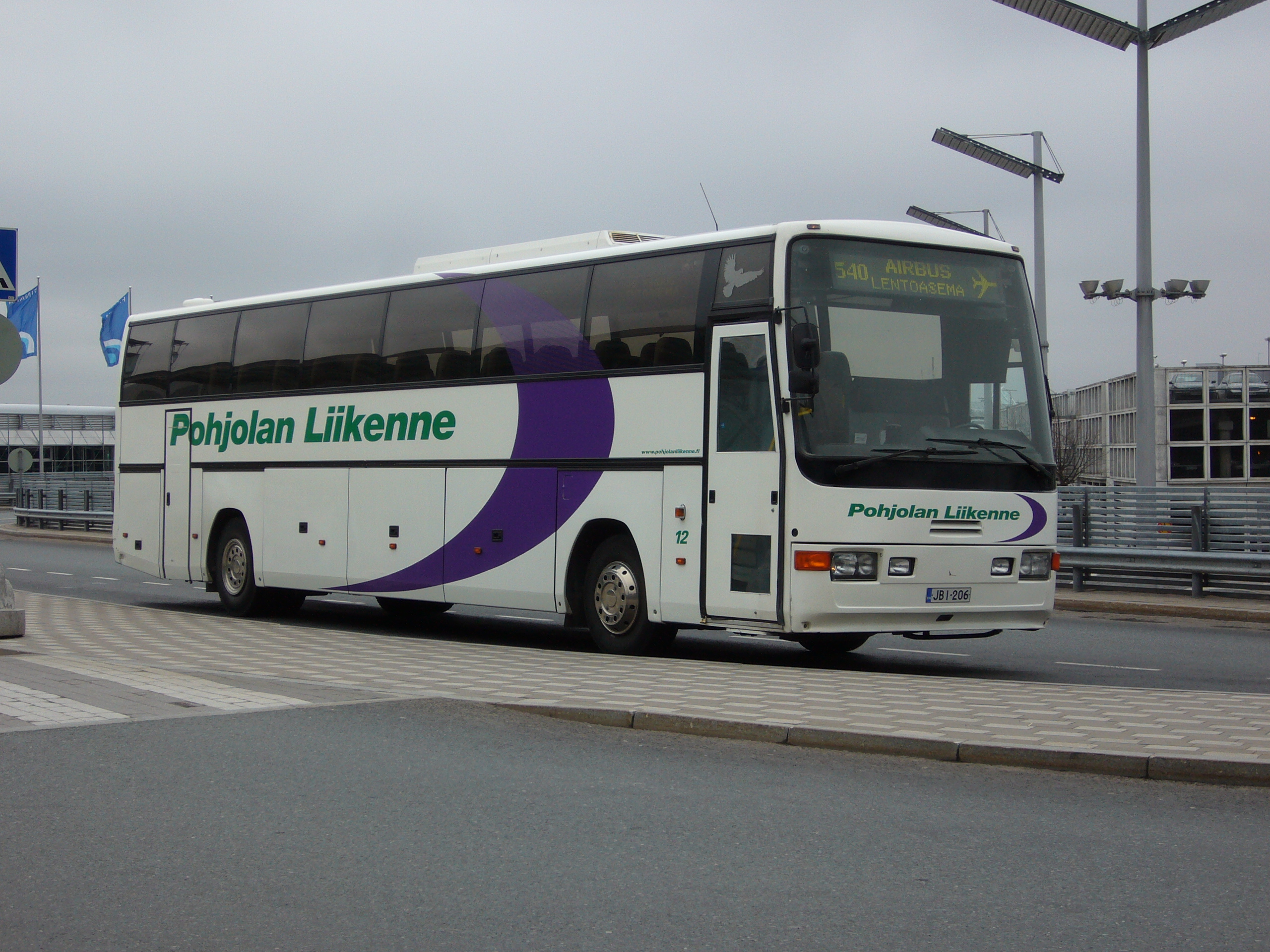
A Scania coach of Pohjolan Liikenne at Helsinki-Vantaa Airport, May 2007.

Oy Pohjolan Liikenne Ab (Northern Transport in English) is a bus operator subsidiary of the Finnish national railway operator VR Group. In 2018, the company operated a fleet of 535 buses at 9 locations in Finland and employed about a thousand people.

== History ==
Between the Winter War and the Continuation War, the Finnish government saw access to Liinahamari harbour as a priority as the German forces controlled the Baltic Sea and Norway. As the railway only extended as far as Rovaniemi, the Ministry of Transport and Public Works decided to incorporate Pohjolan Liikenne to handle transporting goods on the 531-kilometre (330-mile) Arctic Ocean Highway from Rovaniemi to the harbour. In March 1941, the company employed about 3,000 people and had 1,500 trucks.

After the wars, the Finnish State Railways were looking to expand into the road transport industry to complement its rail services, and so in 1949 the Government of Finland decided to transfer ownership of Pohjolan Liikenne stock held by the Ministry of Transport and Public Works to State Railways ownership. After an increase of the company's share capital, stock purchases from private owners, and transfers from the Trade and Industry fund, the State Railways owned 95% of Pohjolan Liikenne stock in 1959. The company began operating buses in 1949.

In 2010, as a part of a wider restructuring of the VR Group, the freight division of Pohjolan Liikenne was merged with VR's rail freight division into a newly formed VR Transpoint. In 2023, VR sold its road freight transport division to German investment firm Mutares.

In 2018, the company terminated its express coach routes.
