= Pirkkola =

Coordinates: 60°14′N 24°55′E

Pirkkola (in Finnish) Britas (in Swedish)
- Neighborhood of Helsinki
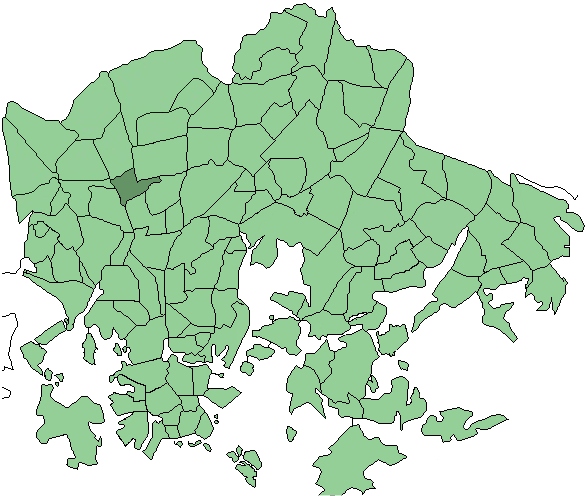
- Location in Helsinki
- Country: Finland
- Province: Southern Finland
- Region: Uusimaa
- Sub-region: Helsinki
- Time zone: UTC+2 (EET)
  - Summer (DST): UTC+3 (EEST)

Pirkkola (Finnish), Britas (Swedish) is a northern neighborhood of Helsinki, Finland.

Sports club Helsingin Palloseura has its home ground in Pirkkola.
