= Tuomarila =

District of Espoo, Finland

Coordinates: 60°12′N 24°40′E

Tuomarila, (Swedish Domsby) is a district of Espoo, Finland. Tuomarila has its own railway station and a primary school.
