= Karakallio =

Karakallio Karabacka
- District of Espoo
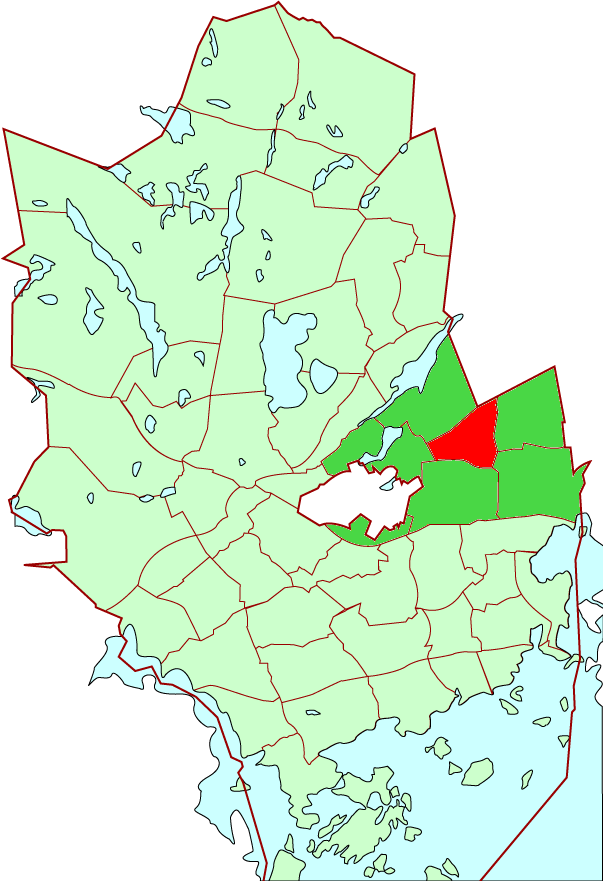
- Location of Karakallio within Espoo
- Coordinates: 60°14′N 24°47′E
- Country: Finland
- Municipality: Espoo
- Region: Uusimaa
- Sub-region: Greater Helsinki
- Main District: Suur-Leppävaara
- Inner District(s): Karakallio

Population (2018)
  - Total: 5,493

Languages
  - Finnish: 87.3 %
  - Swedish: 6.4 %
  - Other: 6.4 %
- Jobs: 436

Karakallio (Finnish) or Karabacka (Swedish) is a district of Espoo, a city in Finland.

The name "Karabacka" dates back at least as far as 1762, at which time the language of majority of the inhabitants was Swedish, and when the name occurs in connection with the "Karabacka Meadow" and also the "Karabacka Mountain". The origins of the name are nevertheless unclear. The Finnish-language version of the name began to be used for an urban development in the 1950s when development of the area was first discussed and planned.

The district is characterized by highrise apartment blocks and a 1960s style shopping centre. The Mormon temple was dedicated in 2006.

== See also ==
- Districts of Espoo
