= Viherlaakso =

Viherlaakso Gröndal
- District of Espoo
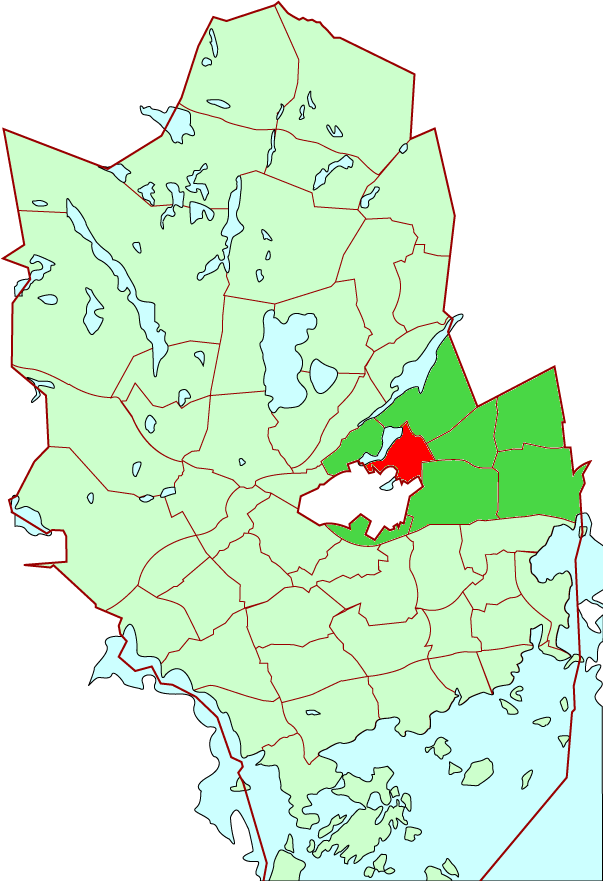
- Location of Viherlaakso within Espoo
- Coordinates: 60°14′N 24°45′E
- Country: Finland
- Municipality: Espoo
- Region: Uusimaa
- Sub-region: Greater Helsinki
- Main District: Suur-Leppävaara
- Inner District(s): Viherlaakso

Population (2006)
  - Total: 5,110

Languages
  - Finnish: 85.5 %
  - Swedish: 10.3 %
  - Other: 4.2 %
- Jobs: 924

Viherlaakso (Finnish) or Gröndal (Swedish) is a district of Espoo, a city in Finland.

== See also ==
- Districts of Espoo
