= Districts of Espoo =

Districts in the city of Espoo, Finland

This is an alphabetical list of the fifty districts of Espoo. Swedish names are given in parentheses.

- Bodom (Note: Puotinen is the Finnish name of Bodom and Kumpyöli the Finnish name of Gumböle. Högnäs also has a less frequently used Finnish name, Korkeakannas. In all three cases the Swedish name is used.)
- Espoon keskus (Esbo centrum)
- Espoonkartano (Esbogård)
- Espoonlahti (Esboviken)
- Gumböle
- Haukilahti (Gäddvik)
- Henttaa (Hemtans)
- Högnäs
- Iivisniemi (Ivisnäs)
- Järvenperä (Träskända)
- Kaitaa (Kaitans)
- Kalajärvi
- Karakallio (Karabacka)
- Karhusuo (Björnkärr)
- Karvasmäki (Karvasbacka)
- Kauklahti (Köklax)
- Kaupunginkallio (Stadsberget)
- Keilaniemi (Kägeludden)
- Kilo
- Kolmperä (Kolmpers)
- Kunnarla (Gunnars)
- Kurttila (Kurtby)
- Kuurinniitty (Kurängen)
- Laajalahti (Bredvik)
- Laaksolahti (Dalsvik)
- Lahnus
- Lakisto
- Latokaski (Ladusved)
- Laurinlahti (Larsvik)
- Leppävaara (Alberga)
- Lintuvaara (Fågelberga)
- Lippajärvi (Klappträsk)
- Luukki (Luk)
- Mankkaa (Mankans)
- Matinkylä (Mattby)
- Muurala (Morby)
- Niipperi (Nipert)
- Niittykumpu (Ängskulla)
- Nupuri (Nupurböle)
- Nuuksio (Noux)
- Nöykkiö (Nöykis)
- Olari (Olars)
- Otaniemi (Otnäs)
- Perusmäki (Grundbacka)
- Pohjois-Tapiola (Norra Hagalund)
- Röylä (Rödskog)
- Saunalahti (Bastvik)
- Sepänkylä (Smedsby)
- Siikajärvi
- Soukka (Sökö)
- Suurpelto (Storåker)
- Suvisaaristo (Sommaröarna)
- Tapiola (Hagalund)
- Vanha-Nuuksio (Gamla Noux)
- Vanhakartano (Gammelgård)
- Vanttila (Fantsby)
- Velskola (Vällskog)
- Viherlaakso (Gröndal)
- Westend
