= Mankkaa =

Mankkaa Mankans
- District of Espoo
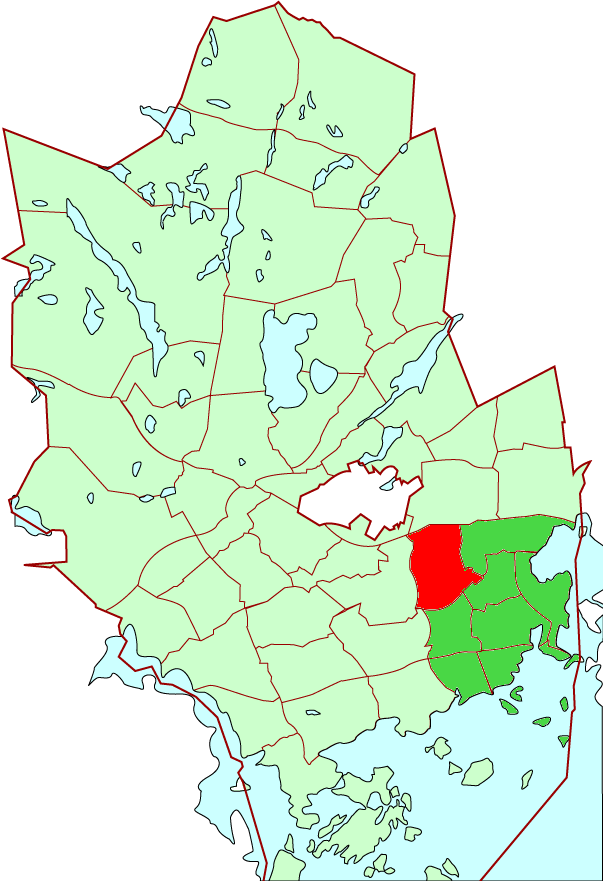
- Location of Mankkaa within Espoo
- Coordinates: 60°12′N 24°46′E
- Country: Finland
- Municipality: Espoo
- Region: Uusimaa
- Sub-region: Greater Helsinki
- Main District: Suur-Tapiola
- Inner District(s): Vanha-Mankkaa, Taavinkylä

Population (2006)
  - Total: 7,704

Languages
  - Finnish: 87.4 %
  - Swedish: 8.7 %
  - Other: 3.9 %
- Jobs: 2,942

Mankkaa (Finnish) or Mankans (Swedish) is a suburb of Espoo, located between Tapiola and Kauniainen, with a population of 8,468 (2023), of which 555 speak Swedish as a first language (2023). Most of Mankkaa falls under the postal code 02180, with 02630 being the code of the areas situated near the Helsinki-Turku freeway in the north. The area under postal code 02180 has one of the highest wage incomes in whole of Finland.

The main thoroughfare in Mankkaa is Mankkaantie, which had been heavily congested with traffic during rush hours until Ring II was completed in 2000. The second major road is Sinimäentie, which is lined with large office buildings and stores.

The first Lidl in Espoo was opened in Mankkaa in 2003.

Teatteri Hevosenkenkä, a theatre catering to a child and preteen audience, is located in Mankkaa. The theatre was founded in 1975 by Kristiina Aropaltio and Sara Sirén. However, the building itself dates back to 1899 and was previously used as a school. Teatteri Hevosenkenkä also houses an art gallery with changing exhibitions.

== History ==
Earlier Mankkaa had been a rural area occupied by a manor, but since the 1960s it has developed into a heavily populated high-income suburban area. The manor, or the estate of Old Mankkaa, was established in the 17th century and originally encompassed 3.50 km² of land. However, through time, the estate lost its lands, most notably in 1944 when land was appropriated to soldiers returning from the Continuation War and refugees from Karelia. Only two buildings survive from the estate today, both dating back to the 18th century.

== Etymology ==
The Finnish name Mankkaa, made official in 1965, is based on the Swedish name Mankans which dates from 1585. In turn, the Swedish name of the area is based on the name of Nils Mancke, who lived in the area in the 1540s. Earlier Swedish names of Mankkaa have been Manckeby (1540) and Manckaby (1541).

== Population ==
- 8,468 people live in Mankkaa.

== See also ==
- Districts of Espoo
