= Nöykkiö =

Nöykkiö Nöykis
- District of Espoo
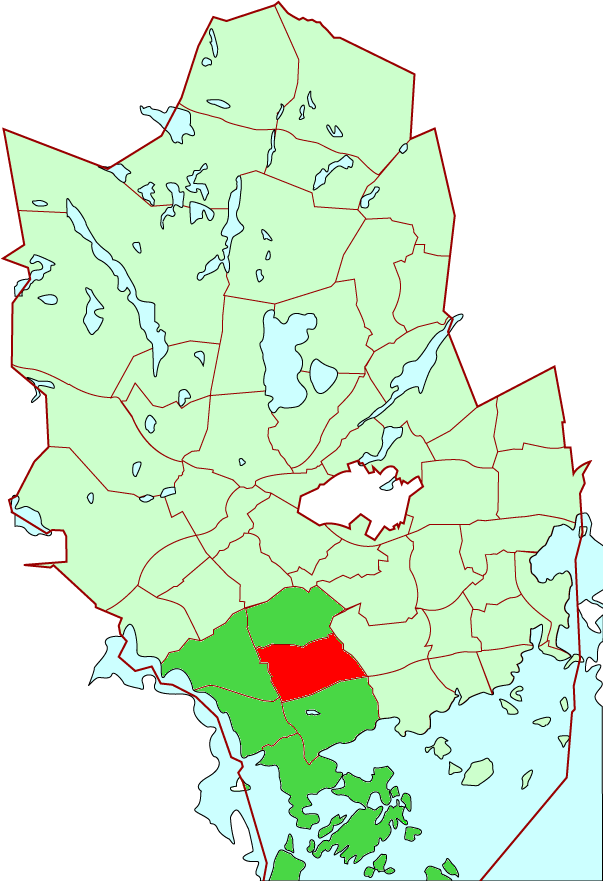
- Location of Nöykkiö within Espoo
- Coordinates: 60°09′N 24°40′E
- Country: Finland
- Municipality: Espoo
- Region: Uusimaa
- Sub-region: Greater Helsinki
- Main District: Suur-Espoonlahti
- Inner District(s): Eestinmalmi, Nöykkiönlaakso

Population (2006)
  - Total: 7,681

Languages
  - Finnish: 85.7 %
  - Swedish: 9.0 %
  - Other: 5.3 %
- Jobs: 2,222

Nöykkiö (Finnish) or Nöykis (Swedish) is a district of Espoo, Finland. It was originally known only by its Swedish name Nöykis, but the Finnish name "Nöykkiö" came into use in the 1940s.

== Schools ==
The district of Nöykkiö has 5 schools that fall under the basic education system. Out of the five schools only one is a Swedish primary school.

=== Nöykkiön Koulu ===
Nöykkiön Koulu is a Finnish secondary school which has grades from the 7th grade to the 9th grade. It started in the year in the year 1986 and has remained open ever since. There is a revamp of the school building planned for 2028.

== Nöykkiönlaakson Koulu ==
Nöykkiönlaakson koulu is a primary school with grades from the first grade to the sixth grade. The school has approximately 300 students.

== Martinkallion Koulu ==
Martinkallion koulu is a primary and secondary school that has grades from the first grade to the 9th grade.

== Eestinkallion Koulu ==
Eestinkallion koulu is a primary school which teaches grades from the first to the sixth.

== Finno Skolan ==
Finno skolan is a Swedish primary school which has grades from the first grade to the sixth grade.

== Photos of Nöykkiö ==
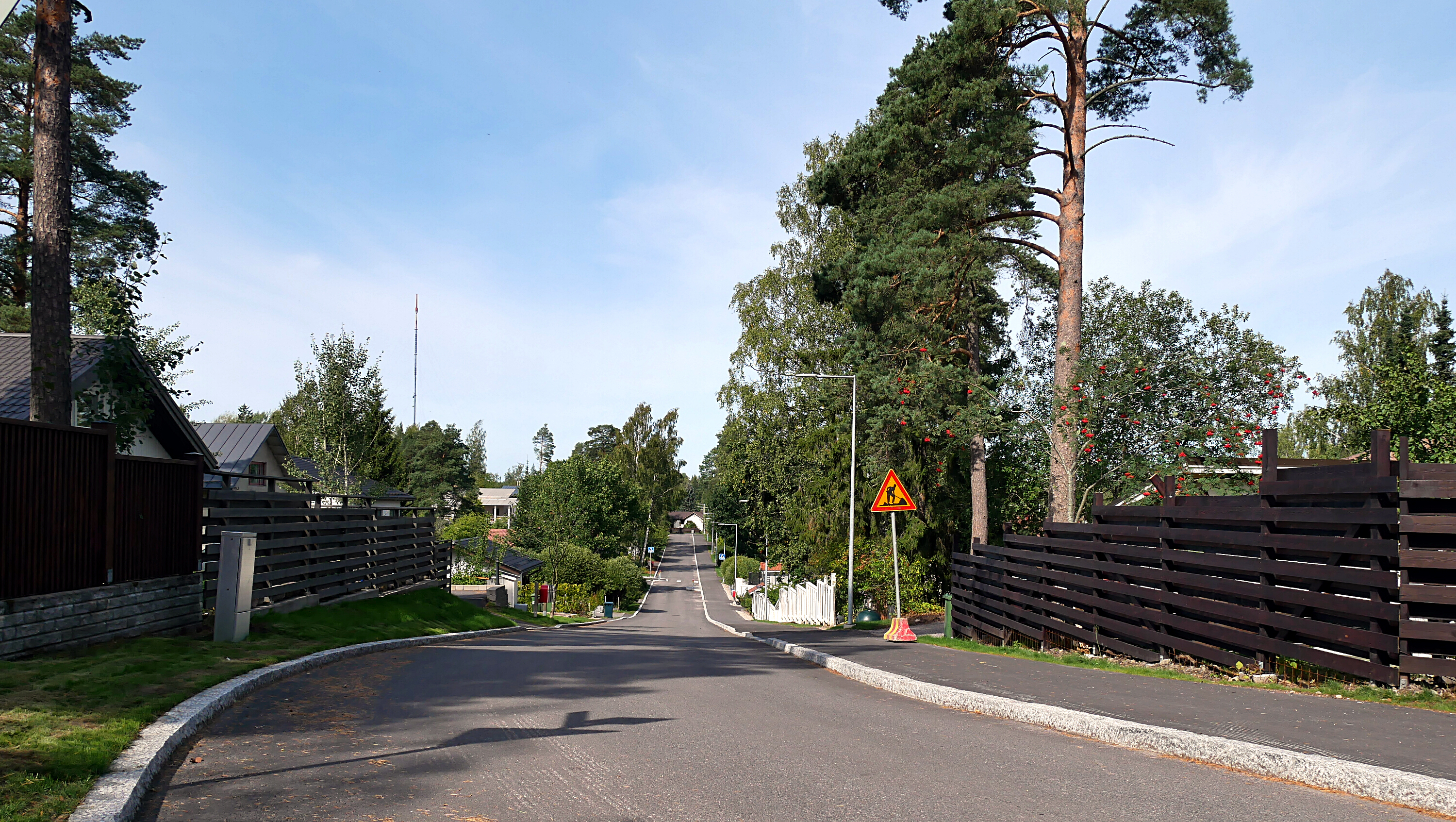
A street in nöykkiö 2019

== See also ==
- Districts of Espoo
