= Lintuvaara =

Lintuvaara Fågelberga
- District of Espoo
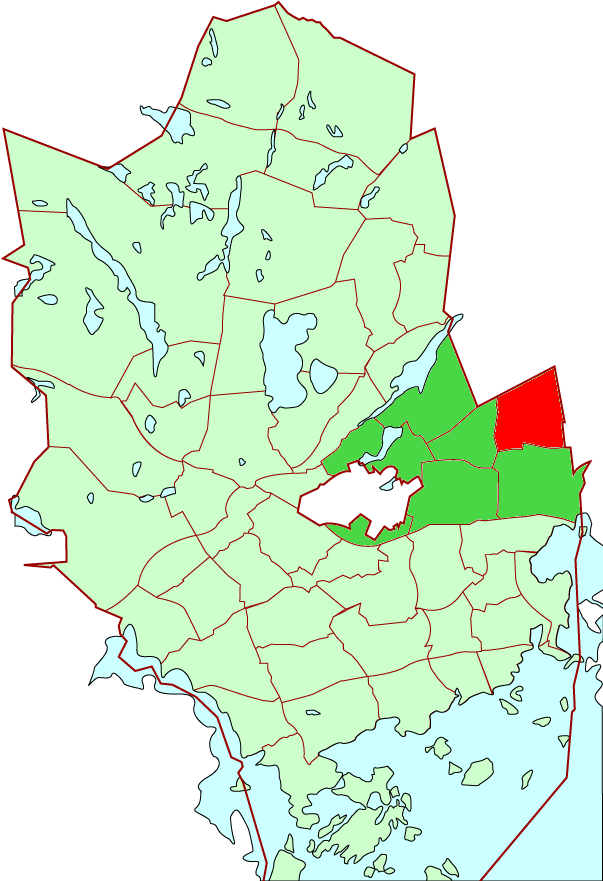
- Location of Lintuvaara within Espoo
- Coordinates: 60°14′N 24°49′E
- Country: Finland
- Municipality: Espoo
- Region: Uusimaa
- Sub-region: Greater Helsinki
- Main District: Suur-Leppävaara
- Inner District(s): Lintukorpi, Lintulaakso, Uusmäki, Lintumetsä

Population (2009)
  - Total: 5,997

Languages
  - Finnish: 90.4 %
  - Swedish: 4.5 %
  - Other: 5.2 %
- Jobs: 501

Lintuvaara (Finnish) or Fågelberga (Swedish) is a district of Espoo, a city in Finland.

Located by a forest, Lintuvaara is known as a quiet suburban area with most of the buildings there being either low density row houses or detached homes. The Leppävaara centre, a major traffic hub and the home to the Sello mall, is only a couple of kilometres to the south from Lintuvaara. Due to the close proximity of services and schools as well as sporting opportunities, Lintuvaara is known as a very kid-friendly neighbourhood and it has thus attracted many families to live there.

== See also ==
- Districts of Espoo
