= Lippajärvi =

Lippajärvi Klappträsk
- District of Espoo
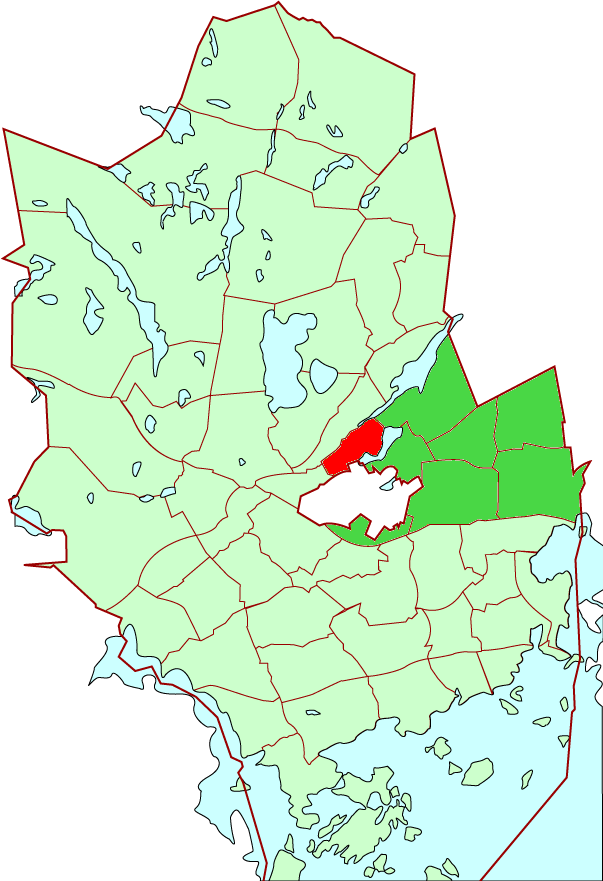
- Location of Lippajärvi within Espoo
- Coordinates: 60°13′45″N 24°42′40″E
- Country: Finland
- Municipality: Espoo
- Region: Uusimaa
- Sub-region: Greater Helsinki
- Main District: Suur-Leppävaara
- Inner District(s): Lippajärvi

Population (2006)
  - Total: 4,094

Languages
  - Finnish: 87.9 %
  - Swedish: 9.4 %
  - Other: 2.7 %
- Jobs: 320

Lippajärvi (Finnish) or Klappträsk (Swedish) is a district of Espoo, a city in Finland. The district borders Lake Lippajärvi, a small lake with a drainage area of 6.9 km^{2}, which had become heavily polluted due to human dumping since the 1940s. In recent years, the lake has been cleaned substantially and now can now be used for swimming.

== See also ==
- Districts of Espoo
