= Laajalahti =

Laajalahti Bredvik
- District of Espoo
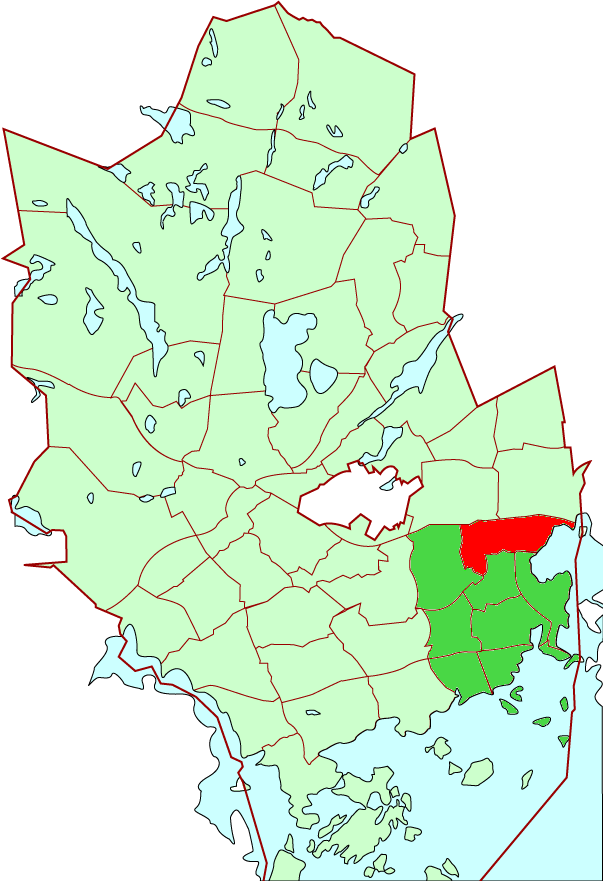
- Location of Laajalahti within Espoo
- Coordinates: 60°12′00″N 024°48′15″E
- Country: Finland
- Municipality: Espoo
- Region: Uusimaa
- Sub-region: Greater Helsinki
- Main District: Suur-Tapiola
- Inner District(s): Ruukinranta, Pohjois-Laajalahti

Population (2006)
  - Total: 3,512

Languages
  - Finnish: 90.2 %
  - Swedish: 6.0 %
  - Other: 3.8 %
- Jobs: 1,865

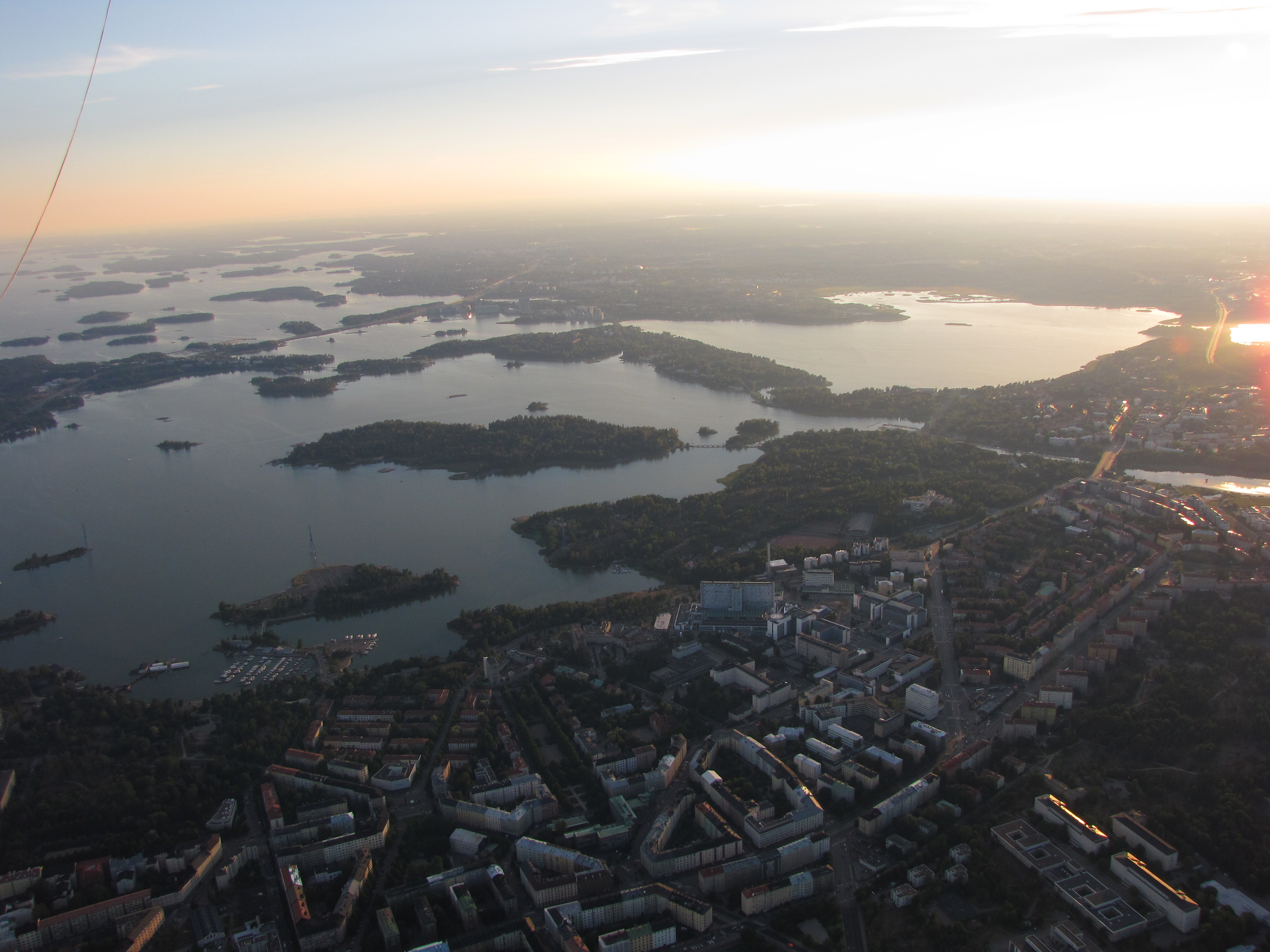
Laajalahti from the air. The Natura 2000 area is shown in the background. On the left is Westend in Espoo, on the right are Meilahti and Seurasaari in Helsinki.

Laajalahti (Swedish: Bredvik) is a district of Espoo, a city in Finland. It belongs to the area of Suur-Tapiola together with Westend, Tapiola, Pohjois-Tapiola, Otaniemi, Niittykumpu, Mankkaa, and Haukilahti. It gets its name from the bay on which it is located. Laajalahti belongs to three sectors; Laajaranta, Lupauksenvuori, and Ruukinranta.

== Geography and nature ==
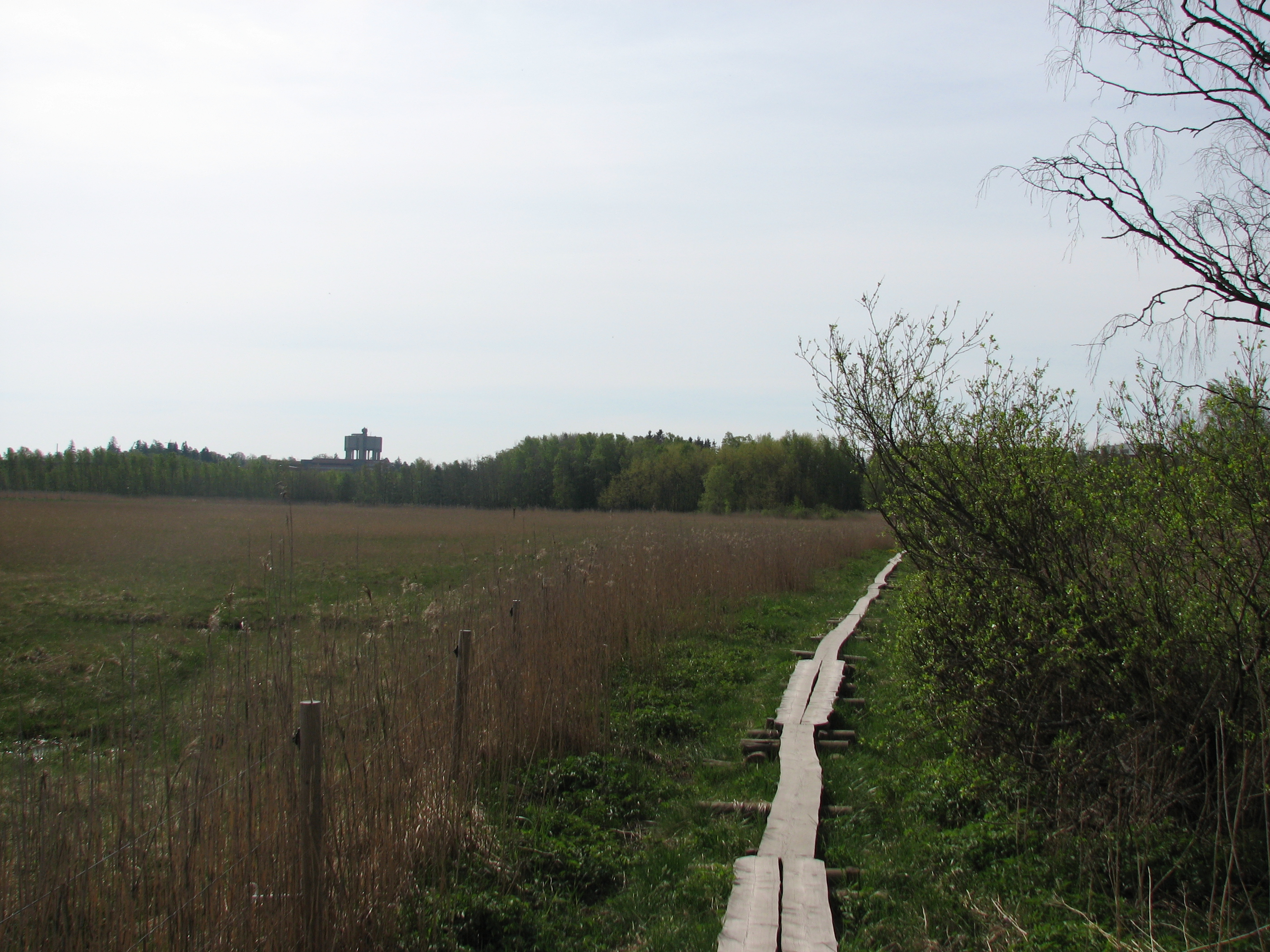
Laajalahti includes a nature preservation area near the seashore, with a hiking trail leading to Otaniemi

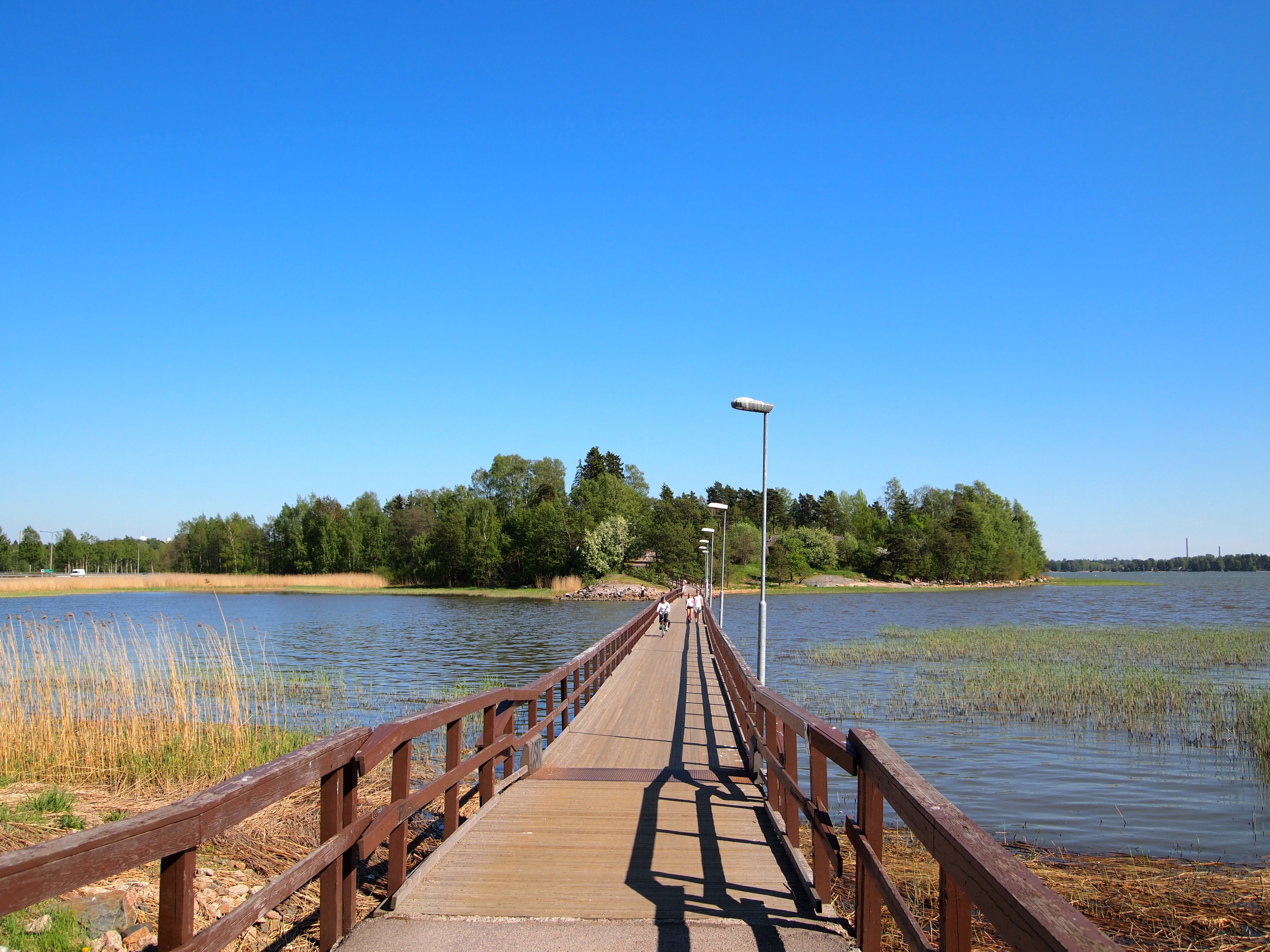
The bridge leading from Laajalahti to Munkkiniemi in Helsinki.

Laajalahti is a marine area particularly known for its bird habitats. The Natura 2000 area in Laajalahti includes a 192-hectare shallow, spacious and grassy bay. As well as the bay and grass field, it is bordered by flood forests, meadow plants, former field areas and bushes.

Laajalahti has been classified as an internationally significant bird habitat. It is home to corn crakes and spotted crakes; also Eurasian bitterns, whooper swans, tundra swans and smews use it as a resting place during migration.

In western Laajalahti, near the golf field, is the culturally significant Muolaansuo swamp area, about two hectares in size. This naturally preserved poor fen is a part of the large Turvesuo swamp in Mankkaa. There are several types of swamps at small spots in Muolaansuo. The swamp is unique in the entire capital area as it is home to culturally significant plants such as the deergrass. The Turvesuo swamp has the only known Cladonia incrassata habitat in the entire country of Finland. This lichen is particularly protected by the nature preservation law. Its 1.9 hectare natural habitat was bordered by a decision from the Uusimaa environmental bureau in 2004. A small part of the habitat was protected as a natural monument already in 1993.

== History ==
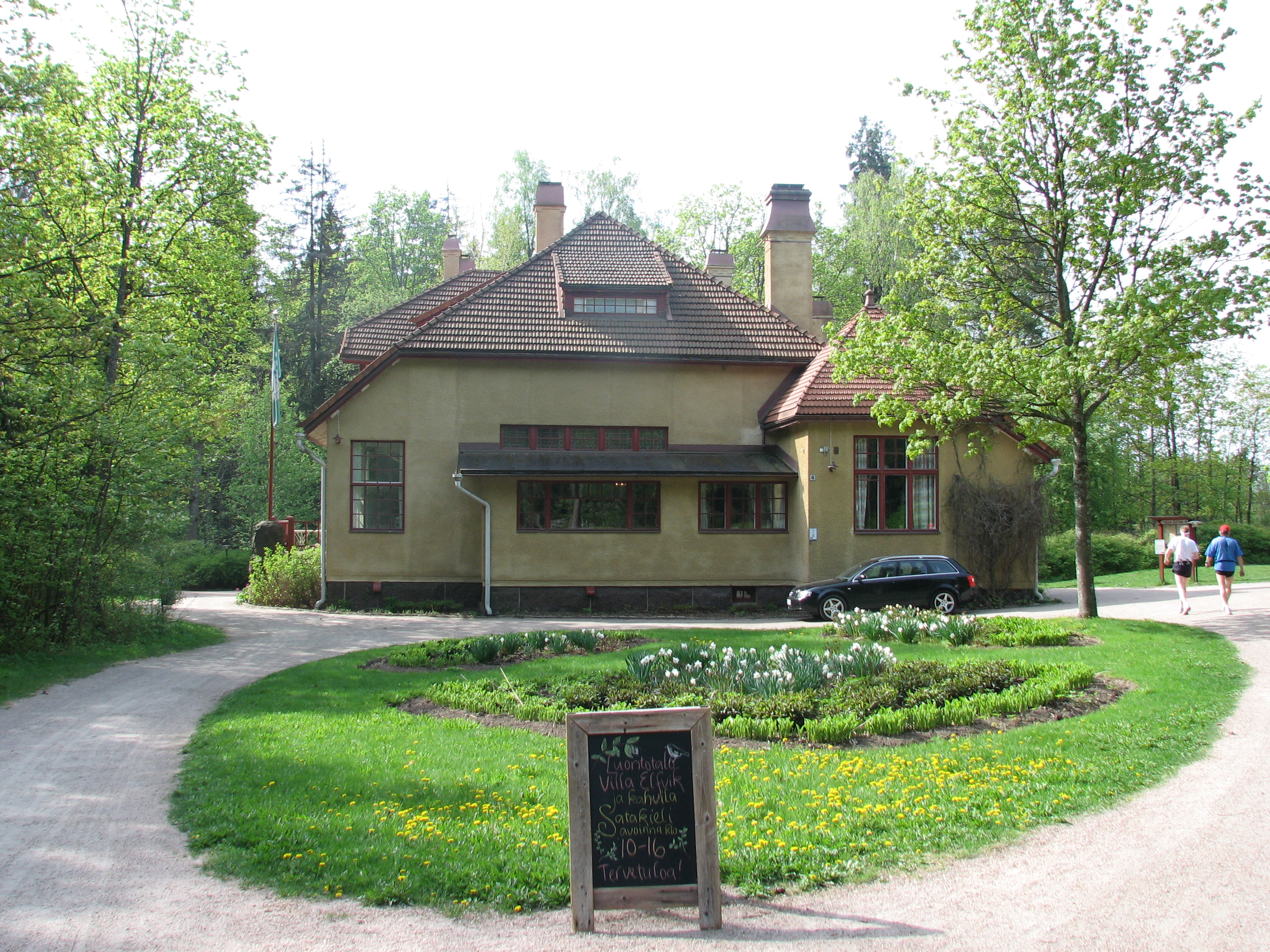
The Art Nouveau style Villa Elfvik is located in Laajalahti.

The earliest sign of human habitation in the Laajalahti area are stone graves. The graves were made in the Bronze Age three millennia ago. These so-called hiidenkiuas graves were close to the sea shore at the time. There is also a stone grave on top of the hill on the eastern edge of the Turvesuo swamp. There originally was a view to the sea from the top of the hill. Comb Ceramic culture findings from the shore of the ancient sea also tell of ancient human habitation.

Laajalahti is one of the youngest villages in Espoo. It was founded during the Swedish colonisation of Finland in the late 14th century at the earliest, on the lands of the Haapalahti Finnish villages. The first inhabitant of Laajalahti was probably some of the Swedish immigrants to Haapalahti. The village name Bredvik (in 1540 called Bredwijkby and in 1544 Bredwijck) is based on a Swedish house name, which in turn is based on the house's location on the shore of a bay. The Laajalahti bay is exceptionally wide and open compared to other bays in the area. In 1540 there were two houses in Laajalahti. The agricultural names in the area are very young and Swedish, but there has also been a Finnish-oriented name Läppnäs, in Finnish Leppäniemi (Alder Point). The Bredvik village was deserted either during the 17th-century famine or during the Greater Wrath. On a 1801 map, the village was once again populated.

There are numerous fortifications from World War I in Laajalahti, which were part of Krepost Sveaborg. The largest remaining outpost XXXI: 1–2, 4-5 is located north of Turvesuontie in Laajalahti. The outpost has a total of 1.3 kilometres of trenches dug partially dug into the cliff, 18 protection buildings, 10 A class, 5 B class and 1 C class positions and some stairs leading down to the trenches.

There was peat industry at the Turvesuo (Swedish: Torvmossen) swamp in western Laajalahti from 1910 to 1962 and a cargo railway track to the Kilo railway station was built to serve it. The Tarvontie road works of the Finnish national road 1 cut off the connection in 1960. The Turveradantie road was completed in 2015 and follows the cargo rail track along the Laajalahti area. The Mankkaa landfill was located in western Turvesuo from 1957 to 1986. The landfill area was later taken to reuse when the Tapiola Golf field and recreation area was opened there.

After the war, Laajalahti developed rapidly in the 1940s. The buildings in Laajalahti are spread quite evenly across different kinds of buildings, most of them are small detached houses.

Along Hagalundintie, now known as Ring I, in Laajalahti there used to be a radio station with a tall radio mast.

Part of the original Laajalahti area now belongs to Pohjois-Tapiola, but is also known as Etelä-Laajalahti (southern Laajalahti).

A speciality of Laajalahti and Etelä-Laajalahti is that the streets in the area are named after former Finnish municipalities on the Karelian Isthmus. The streets have been named so that their order corresponds to the order of the original municipalities in Karelia. For example, there are Terijoentie and Metsäpirtintie in the south, and Jääskentie, Kirvuntie, Hiitolantie and Lumivaarantie in the north.

== Services ==
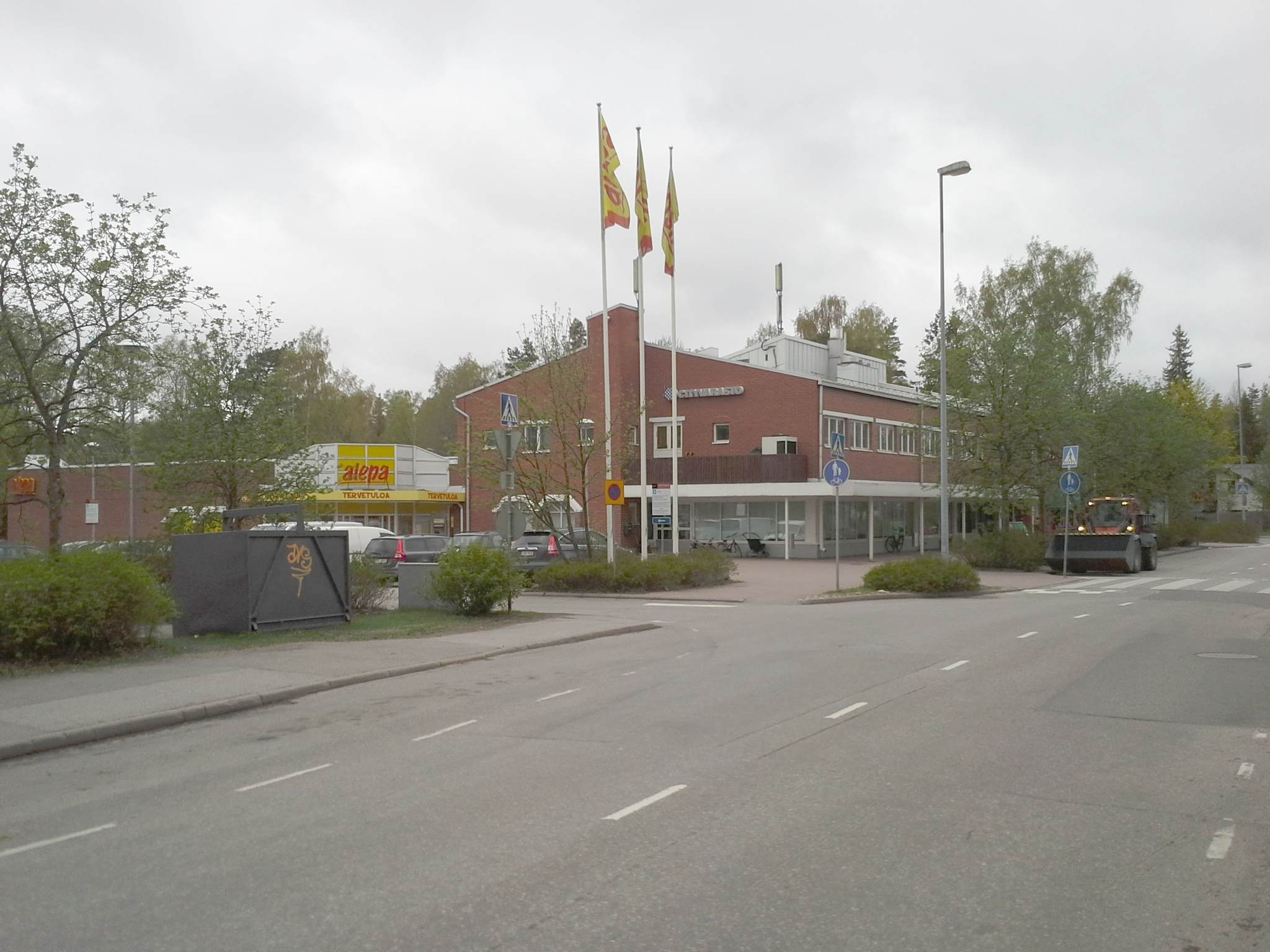
The Laajalahti business area in May 2014.

Most of the businesses and services in the area are located in the Laajalahti business area in northern Laajalahti. The Laajalahti Library located near it served as the main library of Espoo for ten years from 1963 to 1973.

There are cafés and restaurants in Ruukinranta, as well as a boat harbour.

The shopping centre Bredis is located in western Laajalahti. The links type golf field Tapiola golf is also located in western Laajalahti.

== Sights ==
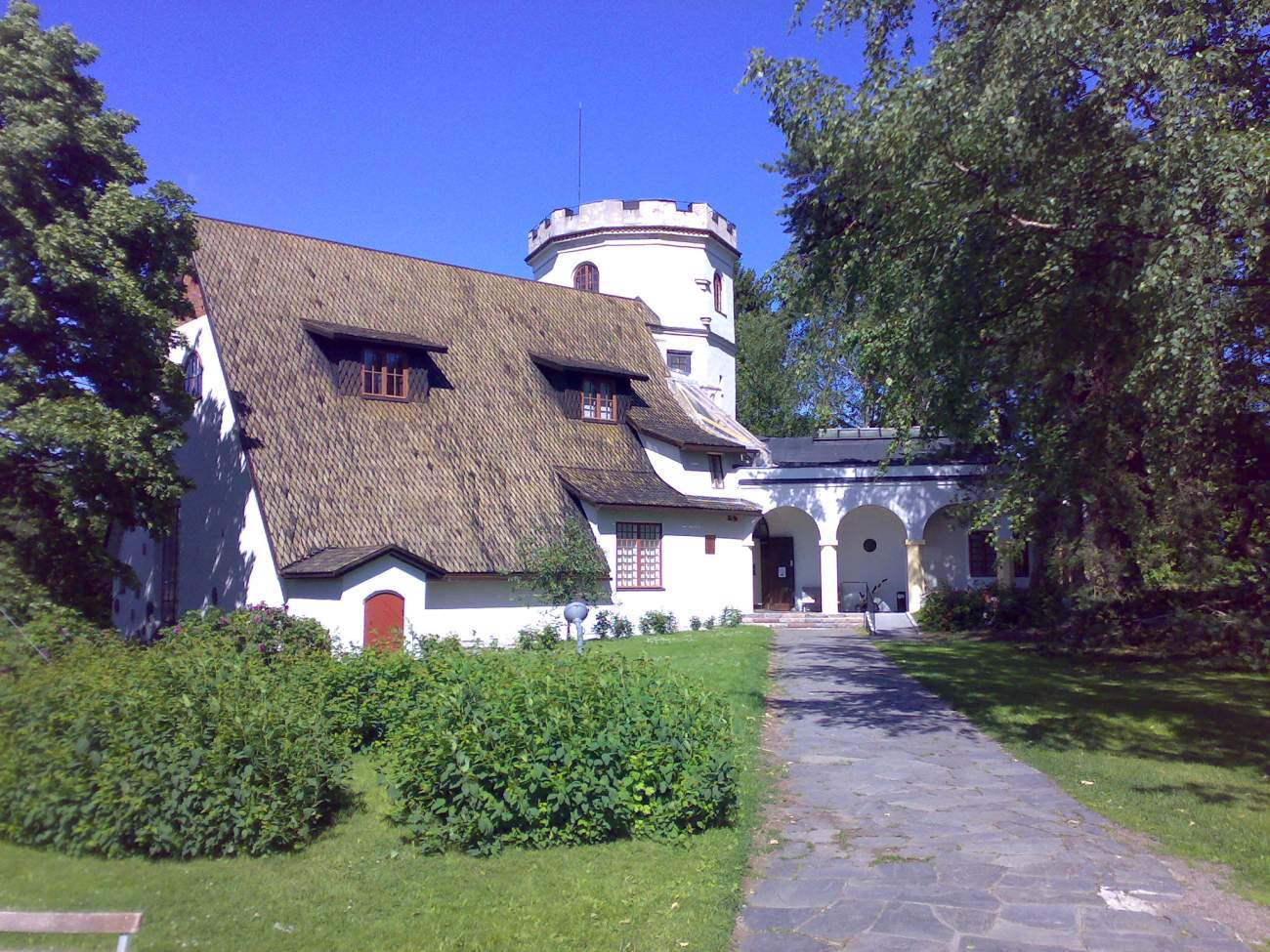
The atelier of Akseli Gallen-Kallela is located on the shore of the Laajalahti bay.

The Laajalahti area includes the Akseli Gallen-Kallela museum, the Villa Elfvik nature protection area, the Laajalahti nature path, the Anja Pankasalo park, the Elfvik granite mine, the Ruukinranta boat harbour and the Kivennavanpuisto artillery outpost.

The flowers in the Laajalahti rhododendron and azalea can be enjoyed from early June to July depending on the current selection of flowers. After the rhododendrons have stopped blooming, the thousands of rare heath spotted-orchids start to bloom. The rhododendron park was built by the environmental group of Laajalahti ry led Espoo's fifth homeland patron Anja Pankasalo. The park was named the Anja Pankasalo park in a ceremony held in 2016.

There is a large granite cliff at the forest surrounding the Villa Elfvik building commissioned by Freiherr Emil Standertskjöld. A mine was founded in the area in the early 20th century, which was used to mine dark red and blood-red Laajalahti granite. Dark red granite was used to build land and sea fortresses such as the Suomenlinna fortress, for the stone structures of the National Museum of Finland and for Villa Elfvik's own needs. The rare and valuable blood-red granite containing garnet is used for jewellery. A large amount of this so-called "Breda red gold" has been planted into a vault in an unknown location in the forest. There are also a few ponds in the mine area.

The Villa Åkerblom is located at the sea shore in eastern Laajalahti.

== Famous inhabitants ==
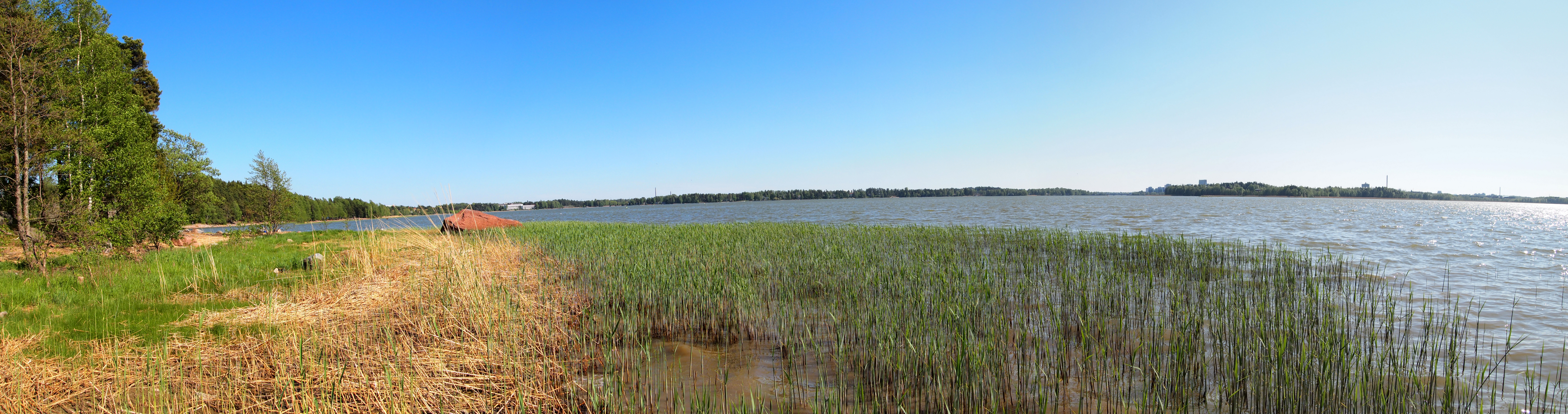
The name of Laajalahti comes from a bay of the same name. Pictured is the Ruukinranta area, where Akseli Gallen-Kallela lived from 1926 to 1931.

Famous inhabitants of Laajalahti have included artist Akseli Gallen-Kallela and sculptor Ville Vallgren. Akseli Gallen-Kallela's atelier is now the Gallen-Kallela Museum.

Current or former celebrities living in Laajalahti include author-illustrator Mauri Kunnas, musician Jore Marjoranta, pianist of the Finnish Radio Symphony Orchestra Jouko Laivuori, Member of Parliament Jyrki Kasvi and newsreader Leena Kaskela. Former Prime Minister of Finland Matti Vanhanen attended the Laajalahti school.

== Laajalahti ry ==
The overall organisation of Laajalahti is Laajalahti ry, founded in 1950. Its purpose is to develop the Laajalahti area to a higher degree of environment and services and to a pleasant living area, as well as gathering information and upholding a genuine Espoo spirit. Laajalahti ry works in connection with the inhabitant forum of Suur-Tapiola.

== Transport connections ==
Ring I goes through Laajalahti in a north–south direction. As the coastal area is mostly unbuilt, most of the habitation in Laajalahti is to the west of the road.

Laajalahti is served by the following bus routes:

- 113 Tapiola - Leppävaara goes throughout the entire Laajalahti area.
- 113N Kamppi - Leppävaara goes throughout the entire Laajalahti area.
- 212N Kamppi - Meilahti - Laajalahti - Kauniainen goes through northern Laajalahti.
- 213N Kamppi - Laajalahti - Kauklahti goes through northern Laajalahti.

The route of Helsinki light rail line 15 (formerly known as Raide-Jokeri) goes through Laajalahti. There are two stations: one west of Hiitolantie, and one on Sakkolantie east of Ring I.

== See also ==
- Districts of Espoo
- Villa Elfvik

== Sources ==
- Härö, Erkki: Espoon rakennuskulttuuri ja kulttuurimaisemat : Byggnadskulturen och kulturlandskapet i Esbo. Second, revised edition. Helsinki: Espoon kaupunginmuseo/Esbo stadsmuseum (City museum of Espoo), 1991. ISBN 951-857-182-1.
- Villa Elfvik, City museum of Espoo, 1986
- Kotinurkilta kallioille - Espoon luontokohteet, City of Espoo, 2012
- Laajalahti ry 10th anniversary publication, 1960
- Laajalahti ry 20th anniversary publication, 1970
- Laajalahti ry 30th anniversary publication, 1980
- Laajalahti ry 40th anniversary publication, 1990
- Laajalahti ry 50th anniversary publication, 2000
- Laajalahti ry 60th anniversary publication, 2010
