= Westend, Espoo =

Westend
- District of Espoo
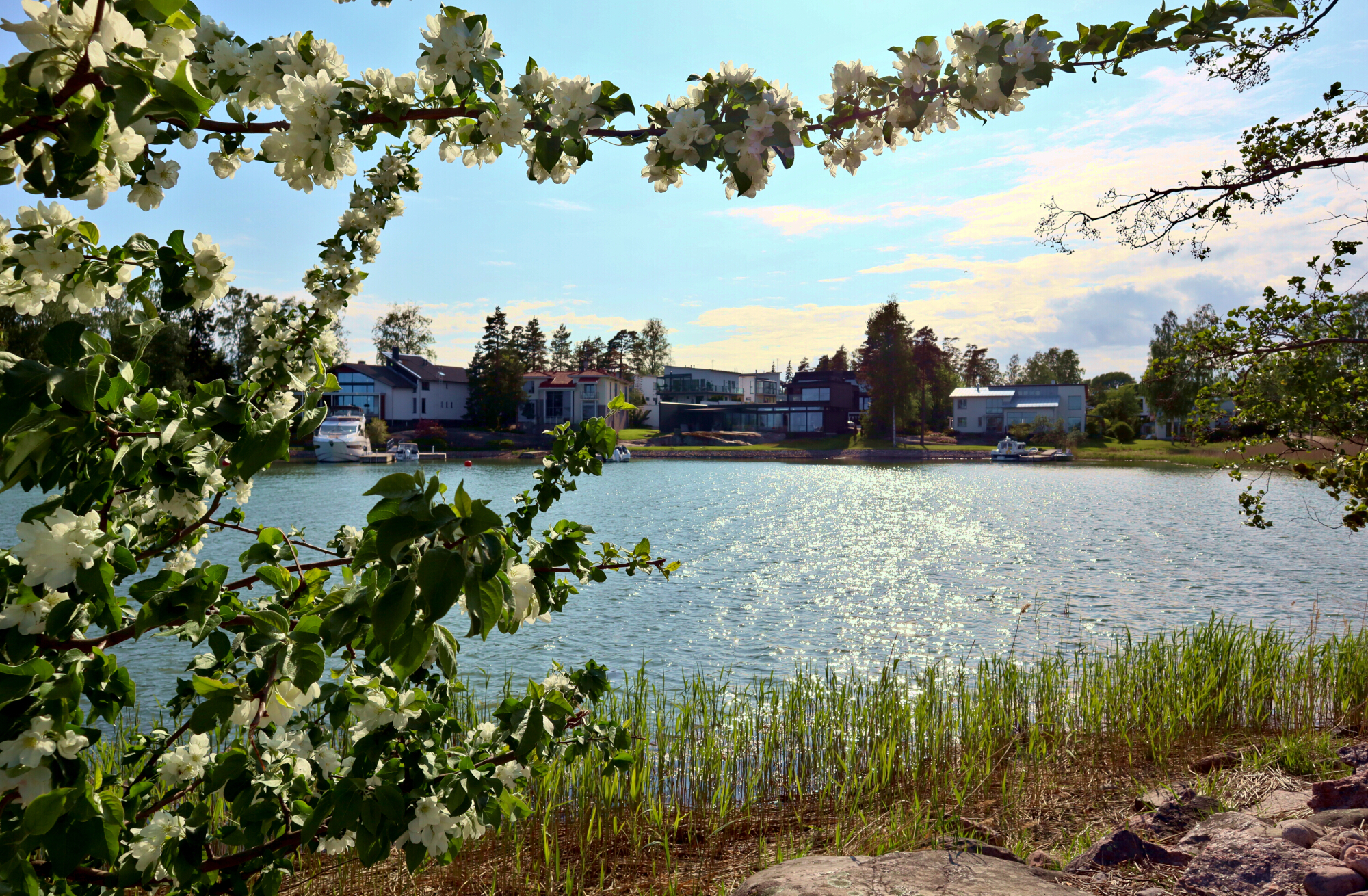
- East bank of Westend, Espoo.

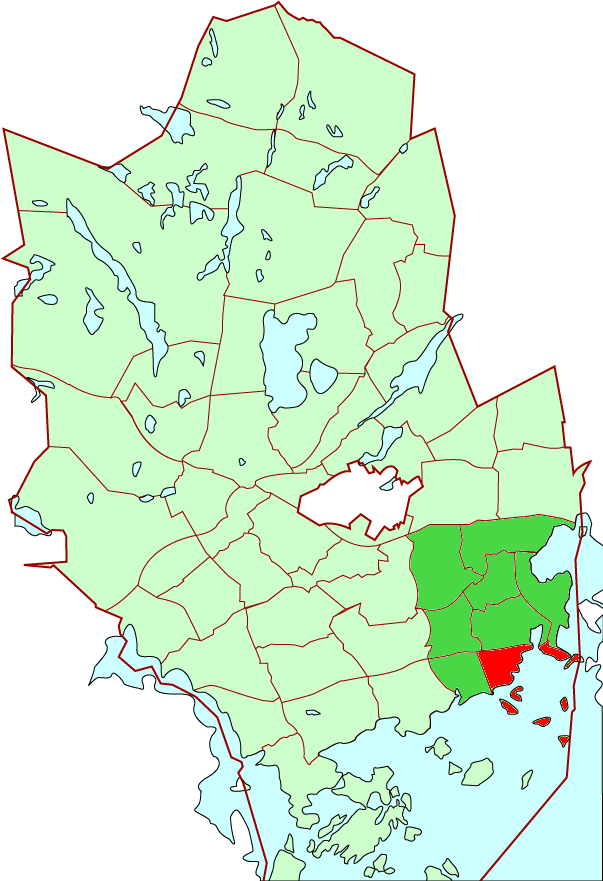
- Location of Westend within Espoo
- Coordinates: 60°10′N 24°48′E
- Country: Finland
- Municipality: Espoo
- Region: Uusimaa
- Sub-region: Greater Helsinki
- Main District: Suur-Tapiola
- Inner District(s): Westend

Population (2018-12-31)
  - Total: 3,078

Languages
  - Finnish: 80.9 %
  - Swedish: 15.3 %
  - Other: 3.9 %
- Jobs: 632

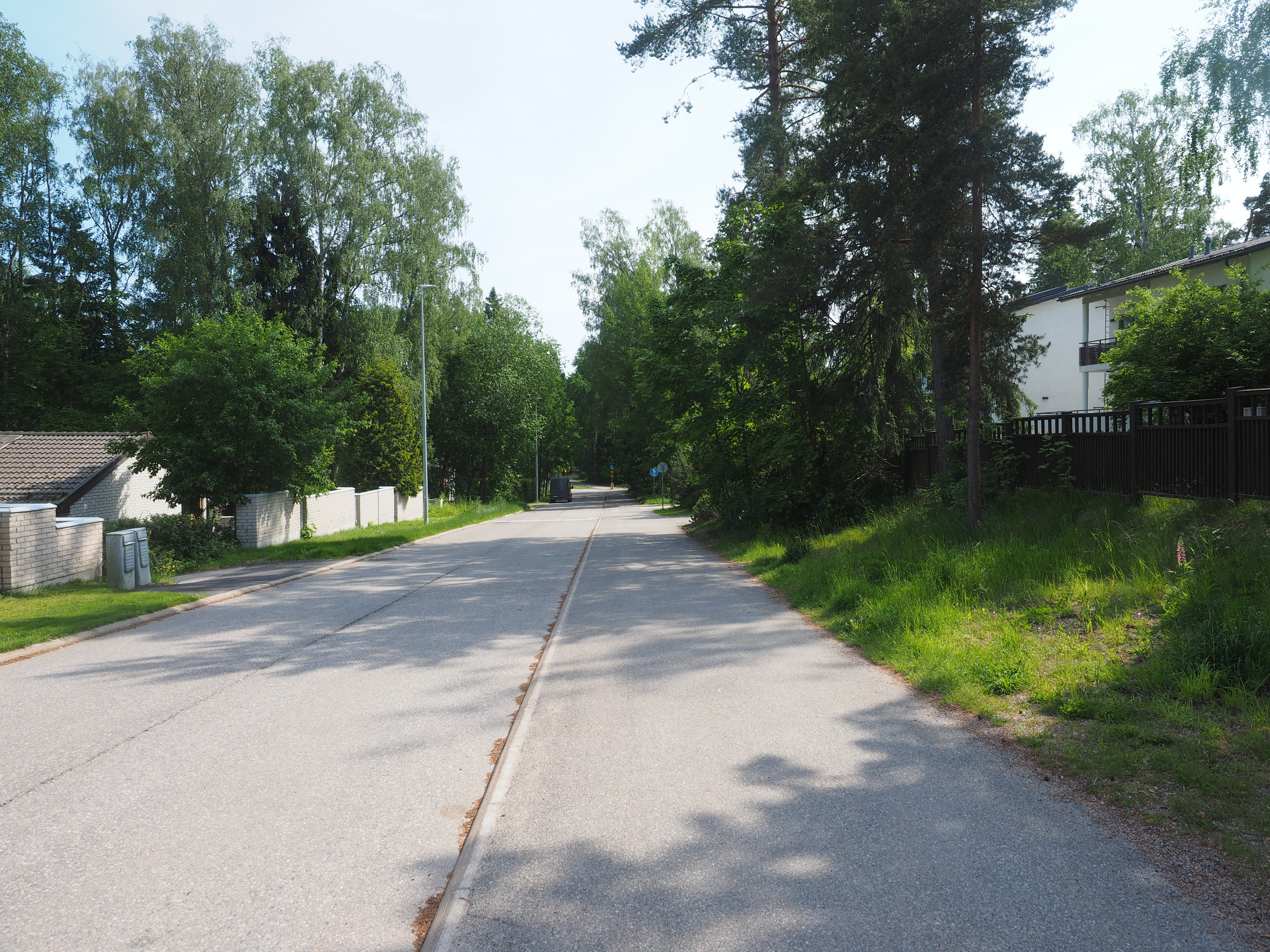
A street in Westend in June 2025

Westend is a district of the city of Espoo, Finland. It is located next to Tapiola and about ten kilometers from the center of Helsinki. From Westend Helsinki can be reached along Länsiväylä (National road 51). Known as an affluent area, Westend is the wealthiest postal code area of Finland by mean household income. In 2019, the area was home to more than 3,000 residents.

Westend is a part of the "Greater Tapiola" district, which also comprises Haukilahti, Laajalahti, Mankkaa, Niittykumpu, Otaniemi, Pohjois-Tapiola and Tapiola.

There are other wealthy neighborhoods with the same name in the UK and the US. The most well known example being West End of London.

Contrary to the district's name, Westend is located in the very southeastern corner of Espoo, west of the Helsinki city centre, by the shore of the Gulf of Finland. Westend also comprises some islands on the coast.

== Sights ==
The Rantaraitti hiking trail passes through Westend, and most of Westend's beaches are located along the trail. There are also some well-preserved parts of the World War I era land and sea fortress Krepost Sveaborg in Westend.

== History ==
The goal of the planning of Westend was to create a high-quality marine villa town in southern Espoo. Particular attention was paid to environmental planning and comfort.

Before southern Espoo was heavily developed in the latter part of the 20th century, the village of Hirböle occupied the area, at least since the 17th century. The village of Hirböle received the Finnish name Hiirala later on, and the names survive in some street names (Hiiralantie, Hirbölevägen). There are also old trenches in the area near the border between Westend and Haukilahti, built during the First World War for defending Helsinki from a possible German invasion.

The Westend area was owned and planned by the lord of the Hagalund manor, Licentiate of Medicine and tennis champion Arne Grahn, and a park avenue has been named after him. The planning was done by Ragnar Gustafsson in 1934. The street map of Westend still remains mostly identical to Gustafsson's 1930s plan. New construction in Westend has occurred mostly by dismantling old buildings, so the old street map plan has been preserved.

The development of Westend is closely connected to the Tapiola garden city built to the north of Westend. In 1945 Grahn commissioned Otto-Iivari Meurman to design a similar plan for a "city" of about 12 thousand inhabitants to be built on the Hagalund lands, and in the early 1950s he sold the area to the Väestöliitto federation, which bought it for the new Asuntosäätiö foundation. The structure of Westend was based on Meurman's ideal of an English garden city, whereas the development of Tapiola was done by the leader of Asuntosäätiö Heikki von Hertzen and younger architects (Aarne Ervi, Viljo Revell, Markus Tavio), targeting a new urban vision.

The Westend area was built starting in the 1930s. Grahn commissioned the Westend tennis hall with two indoor tennis courts and eight outdoor courts. The fencing events of the 1952 Olympic Games were hosted in the Westend tennis hall. In 1949 Grahn sold the hall to the Central Association of Agricultural Producers, and the hall served as a school building. After the Olympics, the Central Association received a new education centre and the tennis hall returned to its original use. In the late 1960s, the tennis hall served as a primary school. The hall was destroyed in a fire in 1967. In the 1970s the Westend area attracted wealthy people and Westend became one of the most expensive places in the entire country of Finland to live in. Most of the new apartments in Westend were built from the 1970s to the 1990s. The apartments in the area are divided fairly evenly between different building types, the most common type being small detached houses.

== Architecture ==
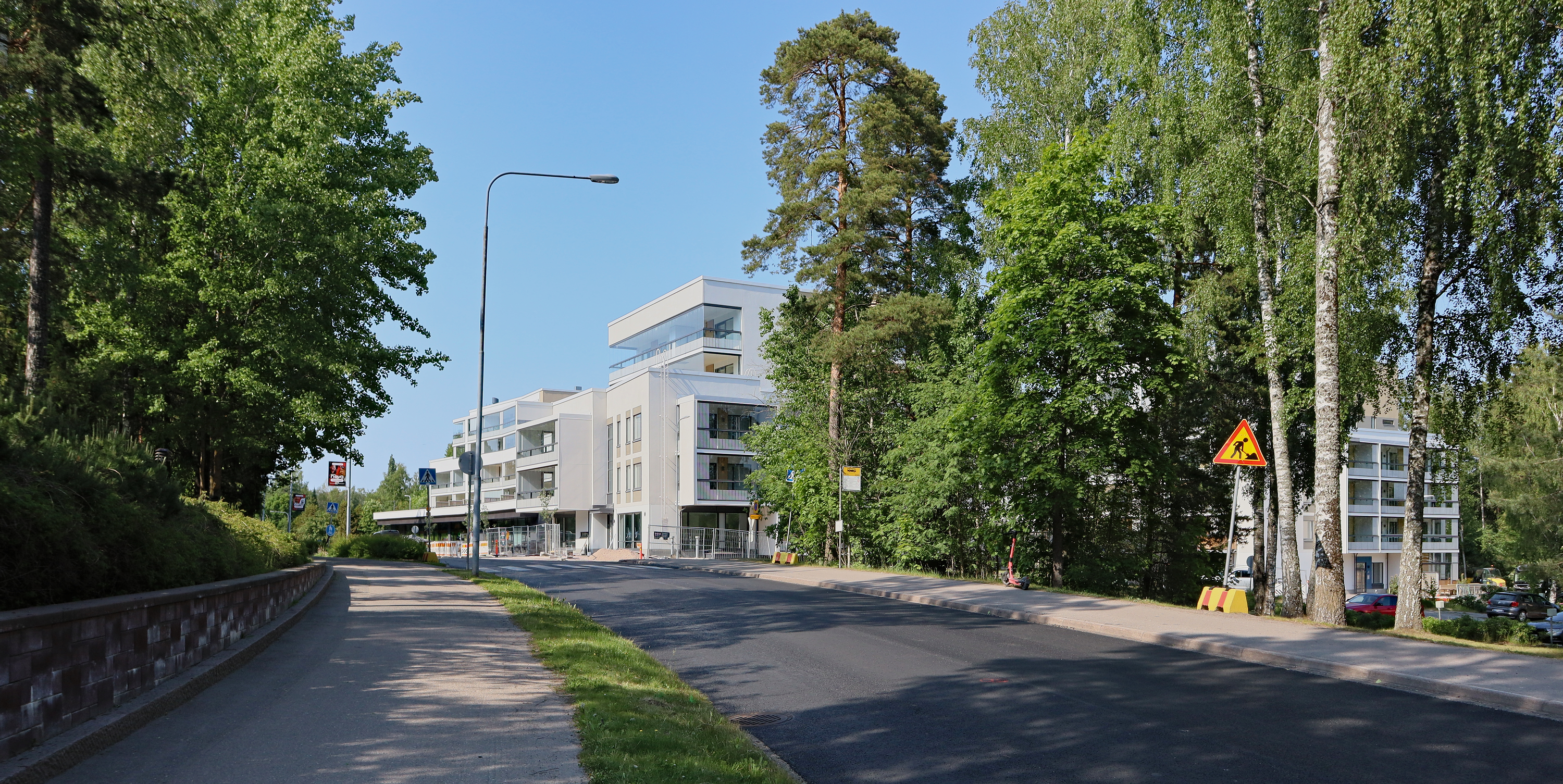
Commercial buildings in Westend.

The architecture in Westend ranges from Art Nouveau mansions to the modern architecture of the last few years. In the early years the buildings were designed by designers newly arrived in Westend such as Georg Wigström, as well as architects on commissions.

Functionalist buildings include Liinasaarentie by Olavi Numminen in 1938 as well as Villa v. Heiroth by Matti Finell in 1936 at Mansikkatie 2 and Länsilinnake 12 designed by Aulis Kalma for sculptor Gunnar Elfgren in 1939.

1940s-style buildings include Ollonqvist (Westendintie 71) by Viljo Revell in 1945, Dag Englund's 1947 villa plan (Westendintie 53) and Villa H. Schlüter (Westendintie 55) by Matti Finell in 1950. The construction of these buildings makes use of slate rock and details typical of the time. Other prominent houses include the culmination of the classical tradition Villa Blumberg (Ankkurisaarentie 6, 1948), the multi-faceted Villa Kihlström (Hiiralantie 5) by P. Lauste in the late 1940s as well as director Kaarlo Forsman's house at Lyökkiniemi 5, designed by Forsman himself.

Since the 1950s architecture in Westend has developed into more diverse options. Modernist buildings include the prominently straight-lined Grönhagen house designed by architect Eero Eerikäinen at Hiiralankaari 3 in 1954. The Villa Ulfves building (Kuninkaanniemi 2) designed by Kristian Gullichsen was built in the early 1960s, representing a type of bungalow with spaces wrapping around an inner atrium. The series of buildings in Westend designed by Erkki Kairamo since the early 1970s represented new and creative, yet tradition-conscious architecture, such as the paired houses at Lyökkiniemi 6 (late 1980s), the Japanese-style white cubical paired houses at Liinasaarenkuja and the terraced houses at Liinasaarentie 3, with movable lattices at the terraces.

== Spa hotel project ==
A new spa hotel with a 18-storey high-rise hotel building is being planned in the area between the Westend beach and the Länsiväylä highway. The planned name for the hotel is Marriott Westend Helsinki. The public beach will remain in its current use. There is an option for a hiking trail between the hotel and the seashore. The plan change for the hotel was made in 2009, after which construction of the hotel was originally supposed to start in 2012 and the hotel was supposed to open for the public in 2014. The spa hotel project has fallen behind schedule, as Heini Wathén, also known as a beauty queen, made a complaint about it to the European Commission in November 2013. According to her, building a congress centre at the planned site would breach the nature directive of the European Union.

== Notable inhabitants ==
- Kirsti Paakkanen, entrepreneur councillor
- Jorma Ollila, chairman of the board of Shell
- Roger Talermo, director of the Olympic Committee
- Pekka Perä, CEO of the Talvivaara mine
- Tapani Kansa, singer
- Alexander Stubb, parliament member from the National Coalition Party and current President of Finland
- Martin Saarikangas, mountain councillor
- Mohamed Al-Fayed, billionaire
- Camilla Al Fayed, socialite
- Jaakko Rauramo, mountain councillor
- Juha Kankkunen, rally driver
- Jyrki Järvilehto, Formula 1 driver
- Mikko Leppilampi, actor and TV personality

== See also ==
- Districts of Espoo
- Finnish national road 51
- Kauniainen
- Lauttasaari
