= Pajamäki Solar System Scale Model =

Scale model in Helsinki and Espoo, Finland

Coordinates: 60°13′17″N 24°51′20″E

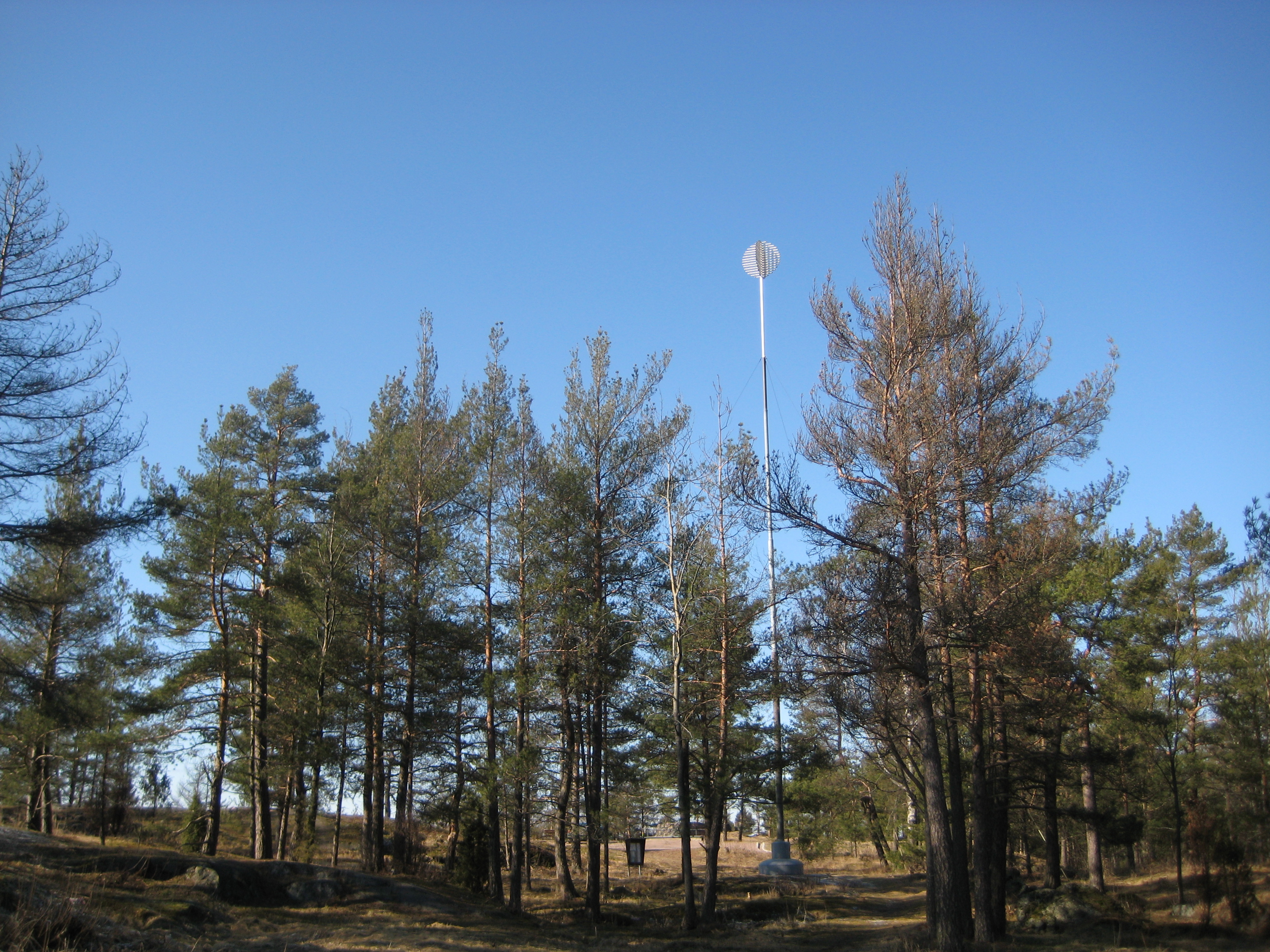
The Sun at the top of Patterinmäki in Pajamäki.

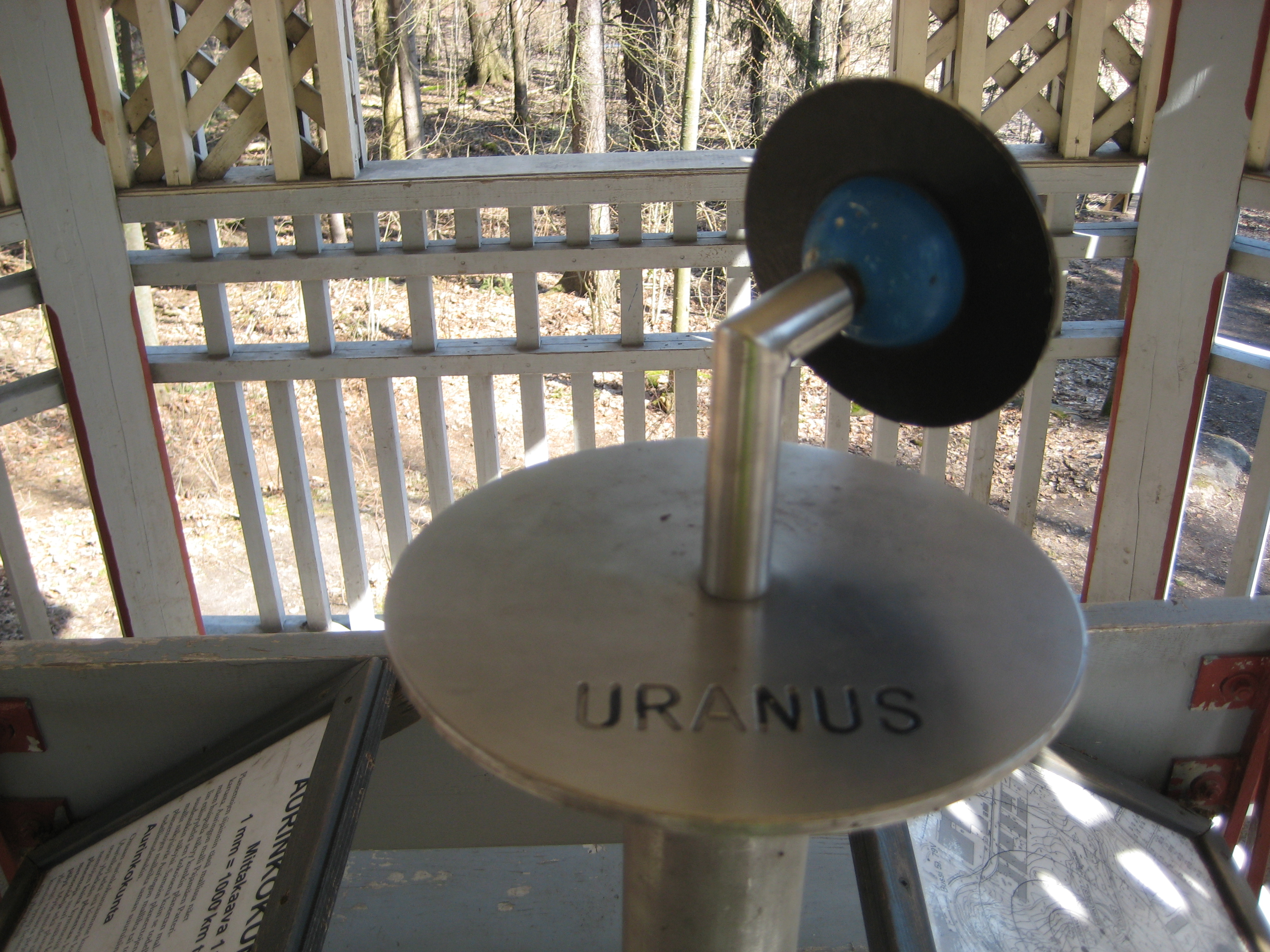
The model of Uranus in a folly near Villa Elfvik in Espoo.

The Pajamäki Solar System Scale Model is a scale model of the Solar System built in Helsinki and partly in Espoo, Finland in 1992. Its scale is 1:1 000 000 000, i.e. one to one billion, so that 1 millimeter in the model corresponds to 1 000 kilometers in the actual Solar System. The coordinates given for the model are those for the Sun in Patterinmäki.

The model was designed by the amateur astronomer Leo Sulamaa, who has had his own observatory in Pajamäki.

== The structure of the scale model ==
The center of the scale model, the Sun, is located at the top of the Patterinmäki in Pajamäki, at the top of a 20-meter pole. It is made of steel pipes, and its diameter is 1.4 meters. The planets are placed on concrete posts so that their distances to the sun are in scale. The sizes of the planets are also in scale: e.g. the size of Mercury is only 4.9 millimeters. There are explanatory texts on the model and the planets near the models in special tables. The texts are in Finnish, Swedish and English.

The diameter of the Earth is in reality 12 760 kilometers, but in the scale model it is only just a little over a centimeter. Due to vandalism, the Earth and the Moon in the scale model differ from the planets, they are presented as holes in a steel plate. The distance between the Earth and the Moon is also in scale. Although the dwarf planet Pluto lost its status as a planet in 2006, it is included in the scale model, together with its moon Charon. The moons of other planets are not represented in the scale model. Due to vandalism, Pluto and Charon are framed.

People walking from one object to another get a clear picture of the speed of light in the scale of the Solar System. In the model, the speed of light would be only 0,3 m/s or ca. 1.08 km/h. One light year in the same scale would be 9 460 km.

== Locations ==
| Part | Location |
|---|---|
| The Sun | Top of the Patterimäki in Pajamäki |
| Mercury | Along a leisure trail in Patterinmäki |
| Venus | Along a leisure trail in Patterinmäki |
| The Earth and the Moon | Along a leisure trail in Patterinmäki |
| Mars | Along a leisure trail in Patterinmäki |
| Jupiter | Talinhuippu, north of the top |
| Saturn | At the corner of Pitäjänmäentie and Höyläämötie, in front of Lidl |
| Uranus | In Espoo in a pavilion near Villa Elfvik |
| Neptune | Western shore of Lehtisaari, near the bridge to Otaniemi |
| Pluto and its moon Charon | Along Länsiväylä, near the intersection to Hanasaari |

== See also ==
- Solar System models

== Sources ==
- The Solar System Scale Model in the Ursa website (including a map)
