= Niittykumpu =

Niittykumpu Ängskulla
- District of Espoo
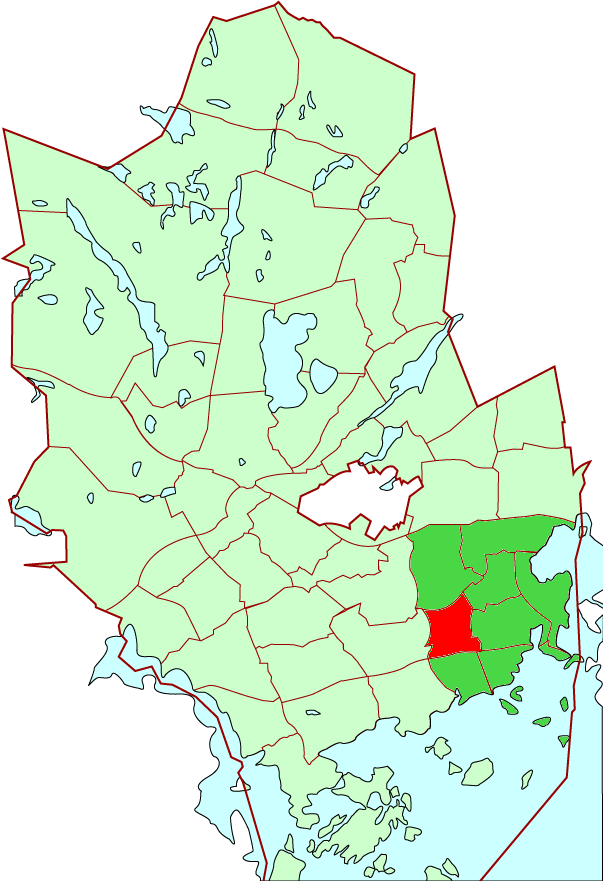
- Location of Niittykumpu within Espoo
- Coordinates: 60°10′18″N 24°45′56″E
- Country: Finland
- Municipality: Espoo
- Region: Uusimaa
- Sub-region: Greater Helsinki
- Main District: Suur-Tapiola
- Inner District(s): Niittykumpu

Population (2006)
  - Total: 3,291

Languages
  - Finnish: 89.3 %
  - Swedish: 7.9 %
  - Other: 2.9 %
- Jobs: 7,596

Niittykumpu (Finnish) or Ängskulla (Swedish) is a district of Espoo, a city in Finland. The districts belongs to the major district of Suur-Tapiola. The district, partly located on the eastern lands of the former Gräsa manor, started developing along with the rest of southern Espoo in the 1930s when the street Jorvaksentie (now known as the Länsiväylä highway) was completed. The first significant construction phase of Niittykumpu happened during the 1960s and 1970s, when a large number of terraced houses were built in the area because of rapid growth of the city of Espoo. Construction slowed down during the early 1990s depression in Finland. Construction picked up pace again in the 2000s and increased even further during the construction of the Länsimetro transport line.

The oldest lower stage primary school, the Niittykumpu school, is located in Niittykumpu. The automobile dealership concentration around the street Merituulentie has been called "the automobile street of Espoo", even though some of the dealerships have slowly moved away from Niittykumpu because of further construction of Länsimetro.

At the turn from 2021 to 2022 Niittykumpu had a population of 7,085 and a population density of 3,374 people per square kilometre. Niittykumpu is served by the Länsimetro line belonging to the trunk routes of the Helsinki Regional Transport Authority, and the Niittykumpu metro station is located in connection with the metro centre located in southern part of the district and the shopping centre Niitty.

== Geography ==
Niittykumpu is bordered by Mankkaa in the north, Olari to the west, Tapiola and Pohjois-Tapiola to the east and Haukilahti and Westend to the south. The Gräsanoja stream is located on the western border of the district.

The street Merituulentie divides the zoning areas of the district in a north-south direction: to the south of the street are the centre of Niittykumpu as well as the areas of Niittykallio and Niittymaa, which mainly consist of apartment buildings and business premises. To the north of the street is the residential district of Tontunmäki consisting of small houses, on the eastern border of which is located an area of low two-storey apartment buildings belonging to the zoning area of Koivu-Mankkaa. The large industrial area of Orion is also located in the zoning area of Koivu-Mankkaa. The industrial area of Olarinluoma is part of the district of Olari according to the district division of Espoo, even though in the statistical unit division it is located in Niittykumpu.

== History ==
=== The first inhabitants and the Gräsa manor ===
The medieval village of Gräsa was located on both sides of the Gräsanoja stream in the Olarinluoma area around the current Olari church. In 1540 the village consisted of two houses and a frälse, which had been founded in the previous century between 1450 and 1460. The old lot and the buildings of the Gräsa manor were located on a hill to the east of the Gräsanoja stream, which was still suitable for water transport at the time, at the site of the current Olari church.

The Gräsa manor was originally one of the most significant manors in Espoo, and it was called "the old frälse" of the area. The manor was known as Haldensböle after the man named Halden who controlled it in the 15th century. It is also known as the Olarsby horsestead. By the start of the 17th century, the houses in Olarsby had been annexed to the Gräsa seat farm. For almost its entire history, Gräsa was controlled by the Hammarstierna family. The frälse was revoked in 1683 and the manor became a horsestead. Gräsa changed owners repeatedly starting from the late 18th century. Landowners in Espoo founded many new croft houses on their lands in the 18th century, which were supported by tax relief. Construction was further increased by the lack of workforce caused by the wars in the early 18th century. The large main building of the manor was built in the 19th century and was thoroughly repaired in the early 20th century. The manor had a large courtyard, containing economic yards and a large garden, which contained 45 different species of fruit trees according to a 1936 survey.

The residential area of Tontunmäki (Swedish: Tomtekulla) in Niittykumpu has developed throughout the yars on the eastern lands of the Gräsa manor located to the west of Niittykumpu. Still in the 1960s the address to the houses in southern Tontunmäki was Matinkylä, Gräsa, Itäpää ("eastern end"). The western end (Länsipää) of Gräsa was probably located in the current area of Olari.

=== Land parcelling and construction in the early 20th century ===
The rapid growth of the population of Helsinki and the construction of the Rantarata railway also caused the population of Espoo to increase in the early 20th century. The growth was mostly located near the new railway connection, as transport connections between southern Espoo and Helsinki were still weak. Travel to Helsinki from the Niittykumpu area was by train or bus, but as the area was not near any major traffic hub, people first had to go along local streets to the train station in Kauniainen or to the bus stop along the Turuntie road in Kilo, and from there onwards to Helsinki.

The Gräsagård village also grew in population: according to a 1865 census there were 61 inhabitants, but in 1920 the number of permanent residents had grown to 145. The village consisted of the manor and its croft houses, and of parcel lots taken mainly from the manor lands in the archipelago. New villa lots were separated from the Gräsa lands in the 1870s, and by 1917 these lots numbered 28. The manor changed ownership to the Finska Agrarbolaget company in 1911, and the limited company Gräsa Gårds Aktiebolag was founded six years later, starting to divide the manor lands into parcel lots in the 1920s. In 1924 the manor lands had been divided into a total of 22 lots, and the area of Haukilahti was separated from its southern part, first divided into 14 lots. Parcel lot activity increased in the 1930s as transport connections in the area improved significantly as the street Jorvaksentie (now known as the Länsiväylä highway) was completed. New road connections coupled southern Espoo better to the centre of Helsinki and allowed it to develop further.

=== Construction from the 1960s to the 1980s ===
Together with the rest of Espoo, construction in the Niittykumpu area increased rapidly in the decades after the war. The first significant phase of construction happened in the 1960s and 1970s, when many new terraced houses were built in the area because of rapid growth of Espoo. The inspiration for the new apartment houses designed by architect Osmo Lappo near the current metro station came from the buildings designed by the French architect Le Corbusier in the 1960s.

New construction was partly done on unbuilt lots, but there were also cases where old villa buildings were demolished to make way for new construction. The city of Espoo bought the main area of the Gräsa manor in 1967. As road connections improved, the geographical connectivity in southern Espoo improved in the 1960s. In the 2010s there were some old buildings and gardens remaining in the Tontunmäki area in Niittykumpu, some dating from before the war, some from the 1950s and 1960s. In the 1960s there were two separate grocery stores in the area.

=== The 1990s and 2000s ===
Construction decreased significantly during the early 1990s depression in Finland, but has since improved since the early 2000s as production of new apartments tripled compared to the depression years.

=== Länsimetro and the new construction phase ===
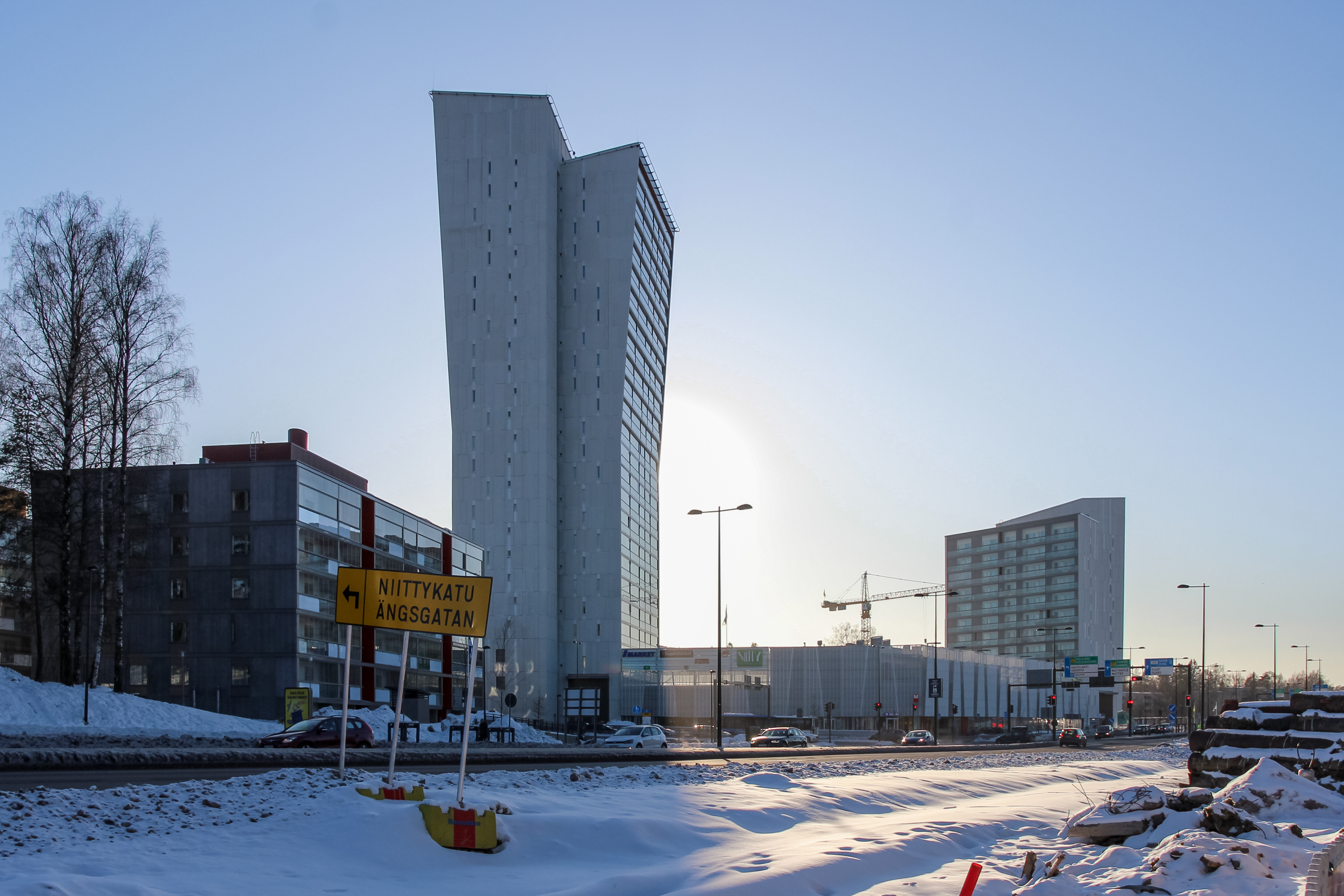
The Niittykumpu metro centre in February 2018.

Construction of the Niittykumpu metro station started in November 2011. Complementary construction of the metro station started in autumn 2012, when Skanska started the construction of the new Liberti residential block in the area between Merituulentie and Länsiväylä. At the start of the Länsimetro construction, Niittykumpu was only supposed to have a preliminary reservation for a metro station, but in October 2013 it was decided to build a full-scale metro station in Niittykumpu, as postponing the construction would have caused the cost of construction of the station to double.

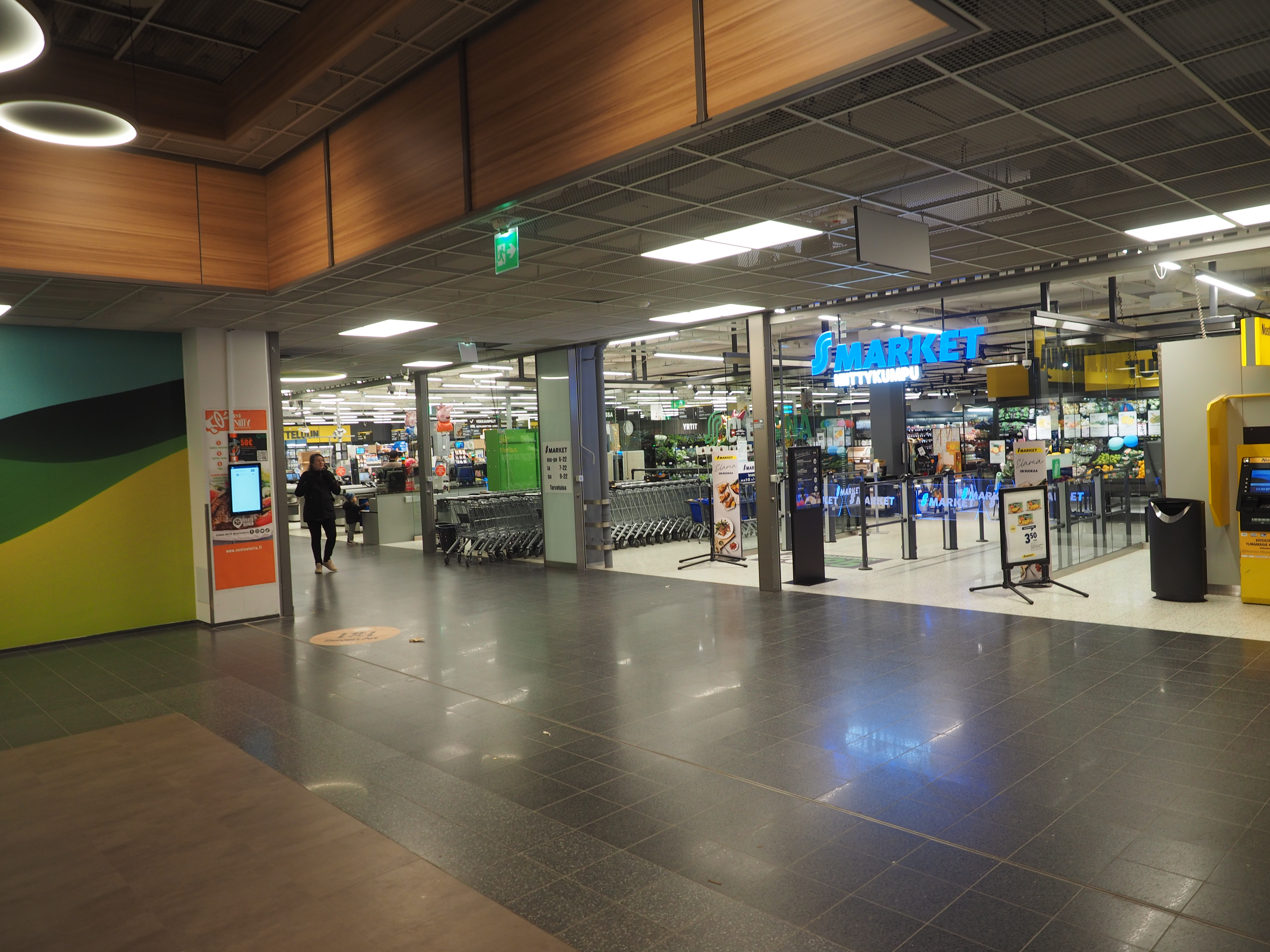
A grocery store at the Niitty shopping centre

Construction of the metro centre started in March 2014, and it was opened to the public three years later in June 2017. As well as the metro station, the metro centre contains the shopping centre Niitty and the apartment buildings Niittyhuippu and Niittytori, of which the former has 24 floors and the latter has 12 floors. When the 90-metre-high Niittyhuippu building was completed, it was one of the tallest buildings in Finland and the tallest apartment buildings Espoo. The old shopping centre Niittytori was dismantled in late summer 2017, and a new apartment building block was built in its place. The immediate surroundings of the metro centre, the Liberti block and the apartment buildings along Haukilahdenkatu, part of the first construction phase of the Länsimetro project, were completed in the early 2020s, when complementary construction of Niittykallio and Merituulentie. The complementary construction of the former Outokumpu office area had reached planning stage. The gas station in front of the Olari church will be dismantled and replaced with a paved Gräsanaukio square, with an underground parking garage for connection transport to the metro station and the church built underneath it. The automobile dealerships Länsi-Auto, Toyota Espoo and Delta will also be moved out of the way of the new apartment buildings. The population of the district is expected to double by the year 2025.

== Services ==
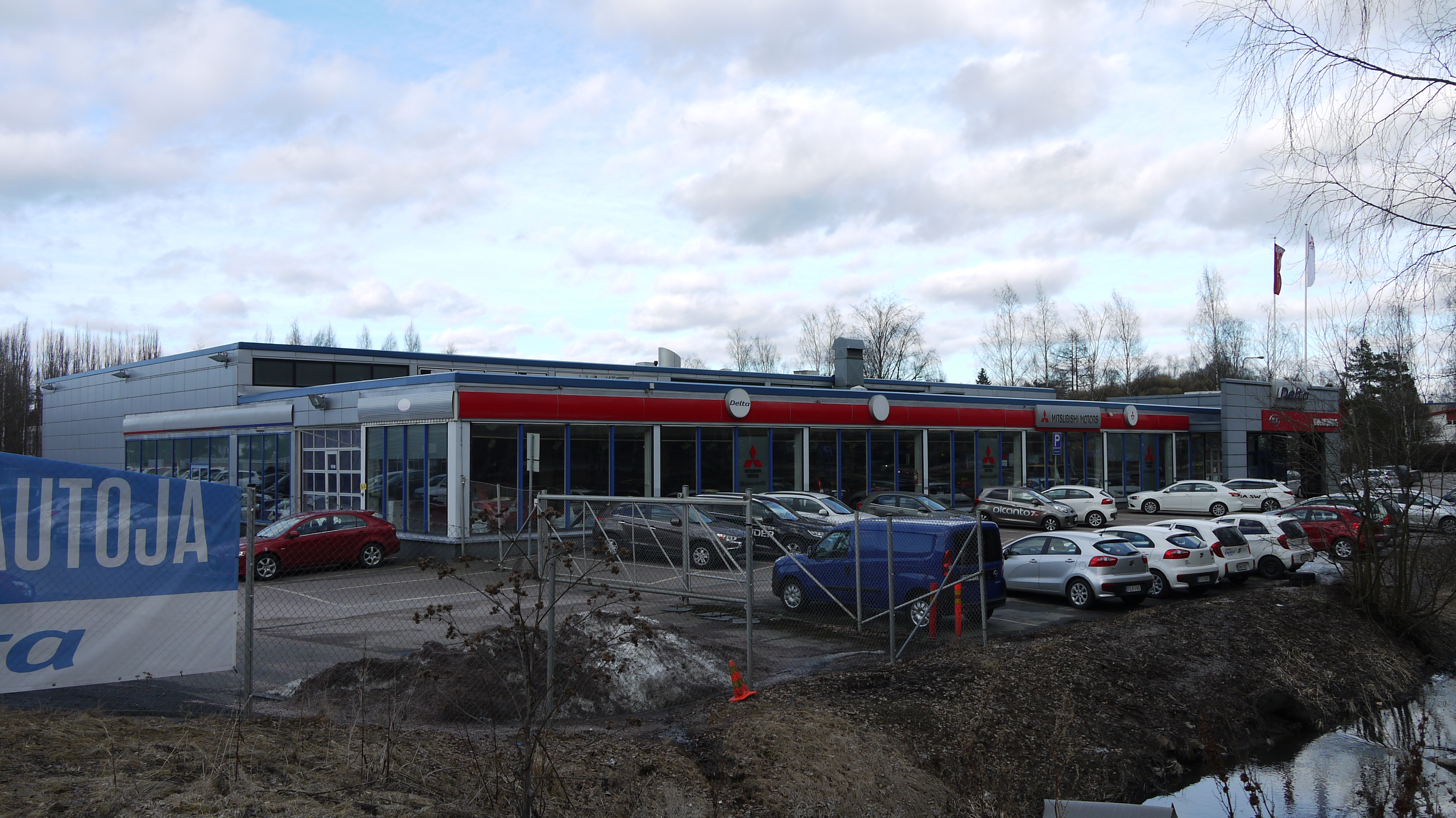
The Delta-Auto automobile dealership in Niittykumpu in March 2017.

Niittykumpu includes the Niittykumpu school, which is the oldest lower stage primary school in southern Espoo.

There have been many automobile dealerships in Niittykumpu, and their concentration along Merituulentie has even been called the "automobile street of Espoo". The area includes the automobile dealerships Länsi-Auto and Delta-Auto. The shopping centre Niitty includes the grocery stores K-Supermarket and S-market, an Alko store, an R-kioski convenience store and a couple of restaurants. The nationwide small-scale storage company Cityvarasto also has a branch in Niittykumpu.

== Population ==
Growth of the population in Niittykumpu since 1975.

Of the 5,412 inhabitants of Niittykumpu the majority are of working age, 25 to 54 years old. The population in the area has grown since 1975, but the growth has increased since the middle 2000s. In January 2015 the proportion of foreign language speakers in Niittykumpu was 6.6 to 11.9 percent, which is less than the average in Espoo (13.3 percent).

Population by age at the turn of the year 2018–2019
0–5	6–15	16–24	25–34	35–44	45–54	55–64	65–74	75–84	85+	Total
327	491	582	1207	771	633	496	541	284	80	5,412

=== Employment, salary level and education ===
In 2015 there were 2,156 employed people living in Niittykumpu. The largest employers in the area were public administration and defence; mandatory social insurance; education; health and social services (560 people), vocational, scientific and technical activity; administration and supportive services (464 people), wholesale and retail sales; transport and storage; accommodation and nourishment (363 people), information and communication (217 people) as well as industry (157 people).

According to an income survey by Yle Uutiset, the highest degree of education among people over 18 years old was vocational school or gymnasium for 28 percent, graduate school for 26 percent, primary school for 16 percent, bachelor's degree for 16 percent and lower tertiary education for 12 percent. About three percent of the population were researchers. Based on the taxable income in the area in 2016, the average income in the area was 42,057 euro per year, which is about six percent higher than the average in the city of Espoo. According to a survey done by Taloussanomat based on statistics in the year 2012 the Niittykumpu postal code area (02200 Espoo) was the 34th wealthiest area in the entire country of Finland.

=== Elections ===
Proportional support for the major parties in Finland in the municipal, parliamentary and European Parliament elections from 2007 to 2019.

The National Coalition Party has been the largest party in Niittykumpu in the parliamentary, municipal and European Parliament elections from 2007 to 2019, receiving 38 to 51 of the votes in the area. The second largest party has been the Green League (14 to 28 percent), with the Swedish People's Party of Finland, the Finns Party and the Social Democratic Party of Finland alternating at places 3 to 5. In the 2006 and 2012 Finnish presidential elections Sauli Niinistö received the most votes in Niittykumpu both in the first and the second round. Niinistö was also the most popular candidate in the 2018 Finnish presidential election with over 65 percent of the votes.

== Transport ==
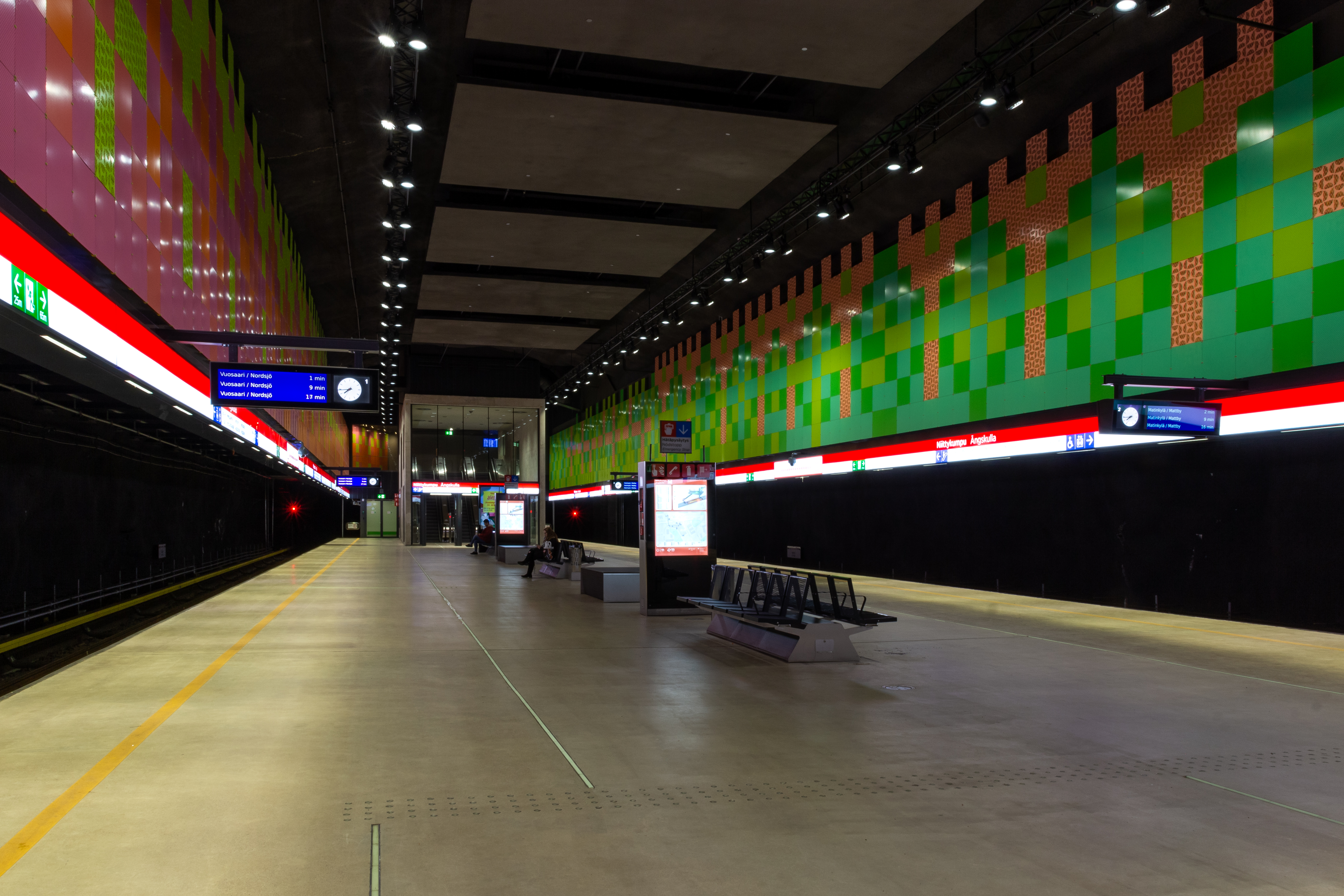
The Niittykumpu metro station in March 2019.

Niittykumpu is located along the Länsimetro line of the Helsinki Regional Transport Authority. The Niittykumpu metro station is located in the district, and the Urheilupuisto metro station is located near its western edge, in the district of Tapiola.

Main traffic routes serving the district are the east-west oriented street Merituulentie, the Länsiväylä highway in Haukilahti to the south of the district and the Ring II beltway in Olari to the west of the district.

== Gallery ==
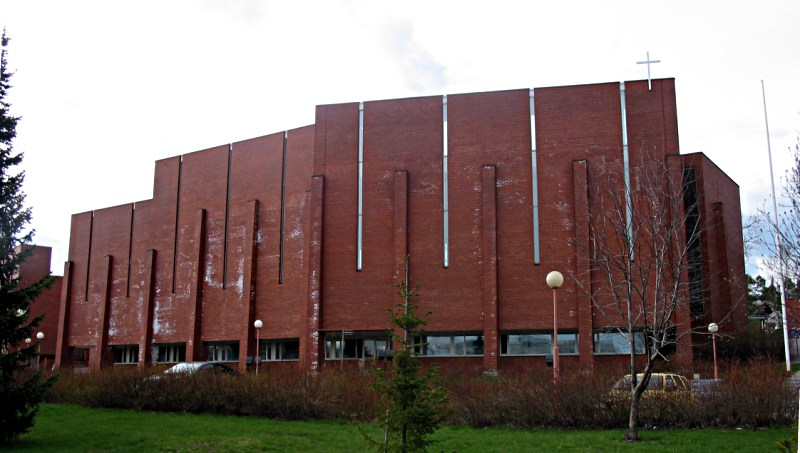
The Olari church is located in Niittykumpu.

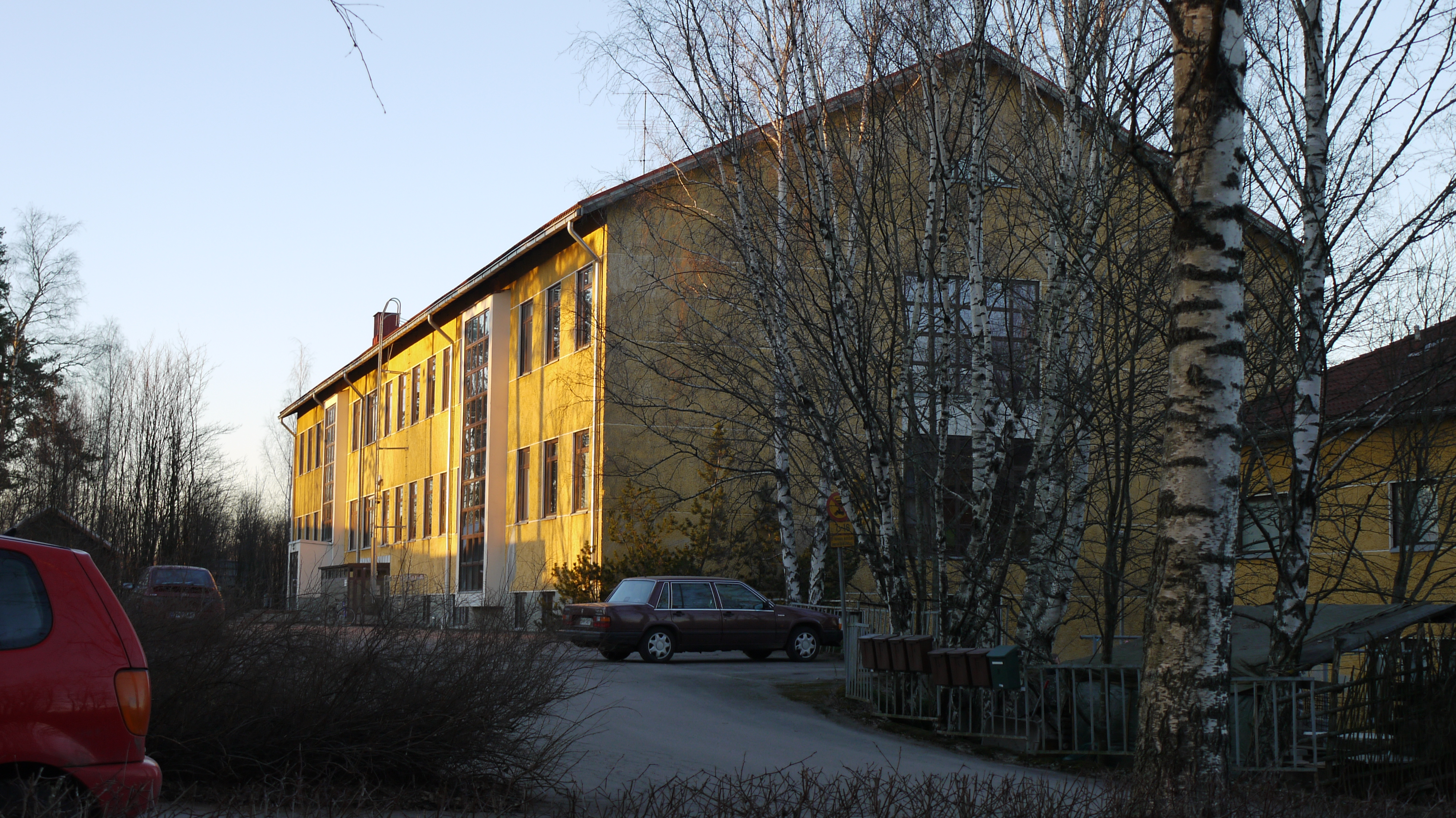
The Niitykumpu school.

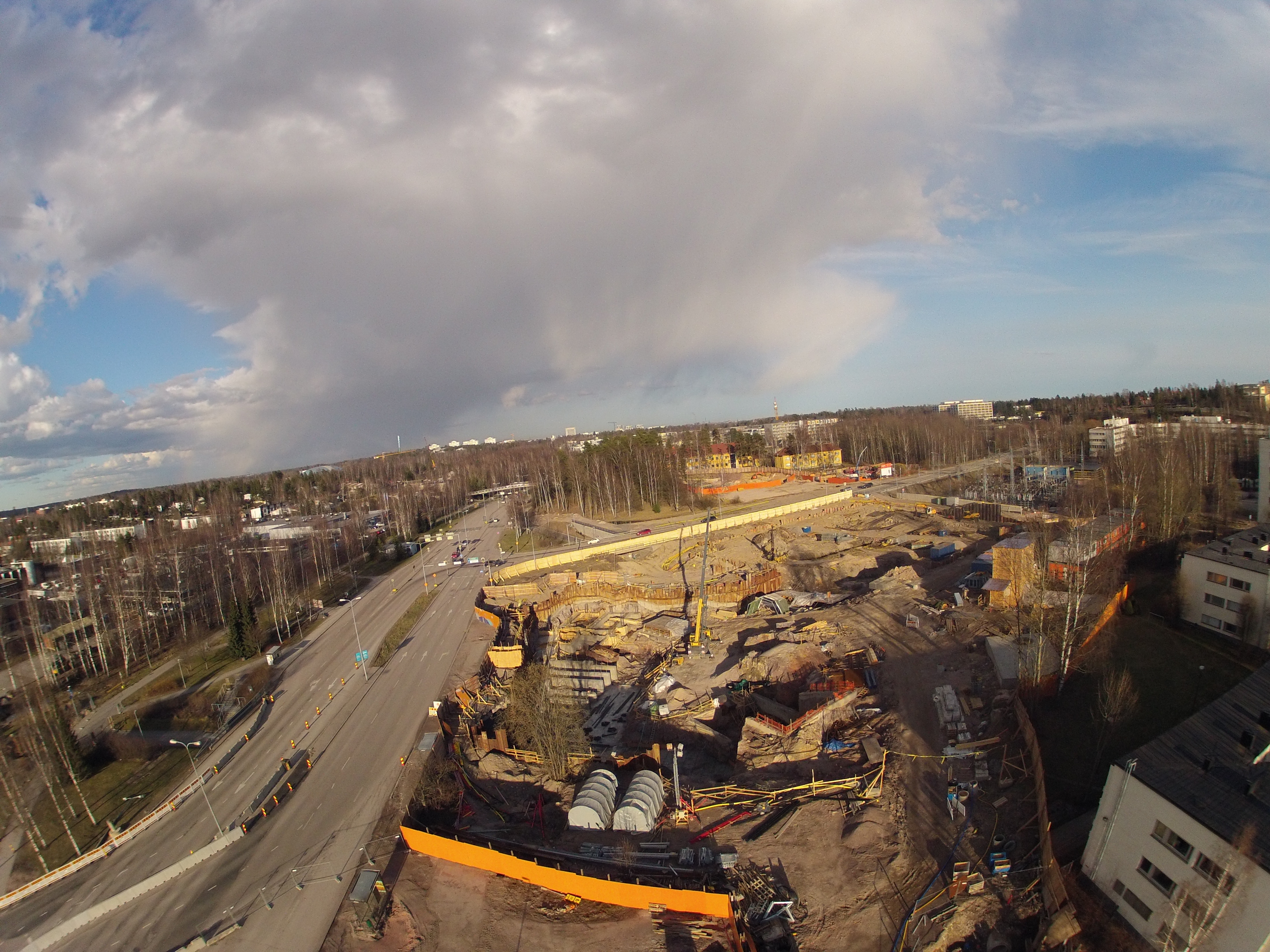
The Niittykumpu metro station under construction in 2015.

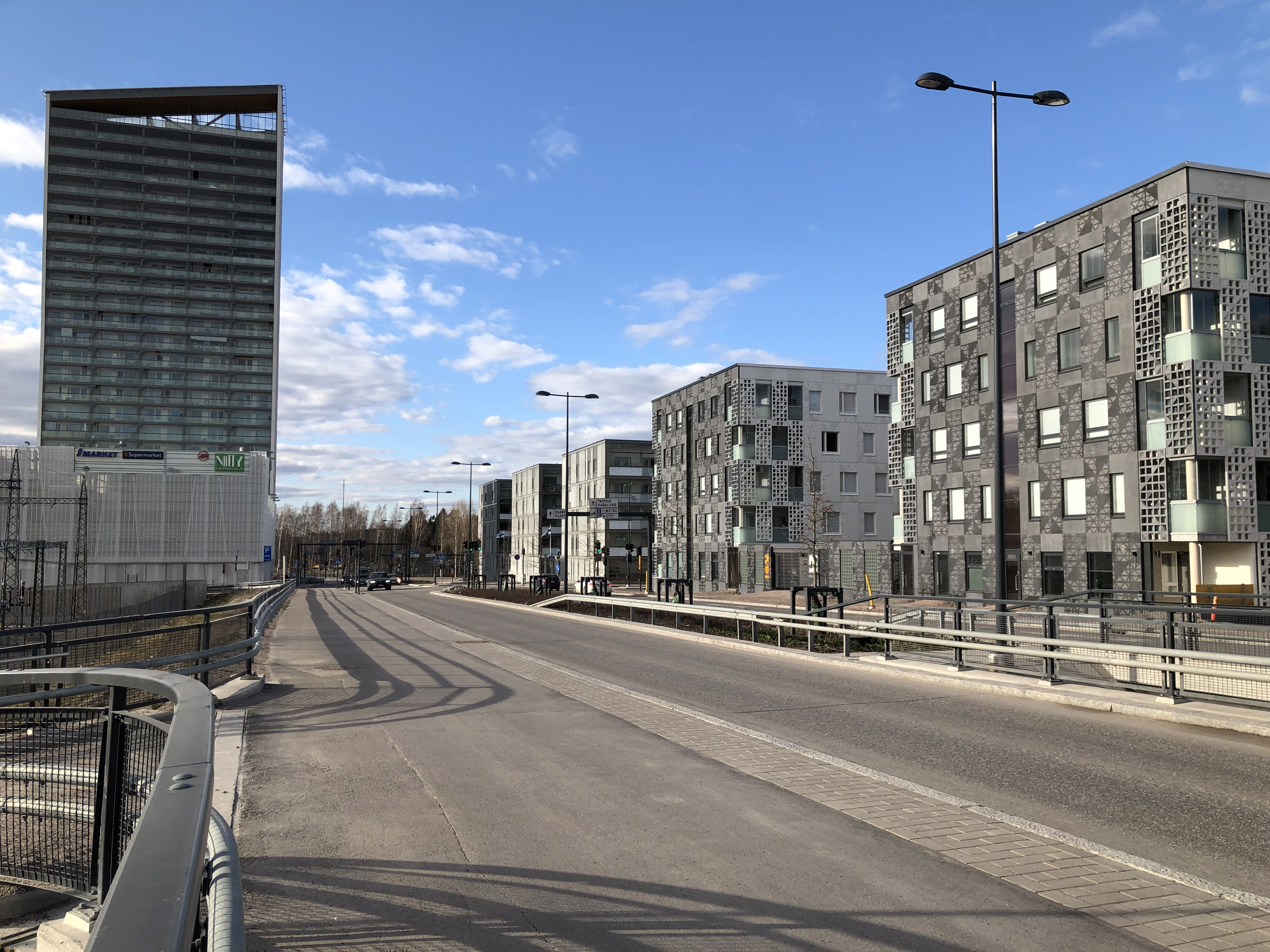
Haukilahdenkatu in 2019.

== Publications ==
- Lammi, Esa; Mäkinen, Jussi; Hagner-Wahlsten, Nina: Olarinluoman ja Tontunmaen luontoselvitys, Ympäristösuunnittelu Enviro Oy 11 December 2013. Accessed on 8 December 2018.
- Niittykummun keskus, asemakaavan muutos: Luontoselvitys 2011, Luontotieto Keiron Oy 29 November 2011. Accessed on 8 December 2018.
- Niemi, Pia: Ristiriitojen hallinnan mahdollisuudet maankäytön suunnittelussa: Tapaus Espoon Niittykumpu, Aalto University School of Engineering 10 April 2017. Accessed on 9 December 2018.

== See also ==
- Districts of Espoo
