= Niittykumpu metro station =

Helsinki Metro station

Niittykumpu Ängskulla
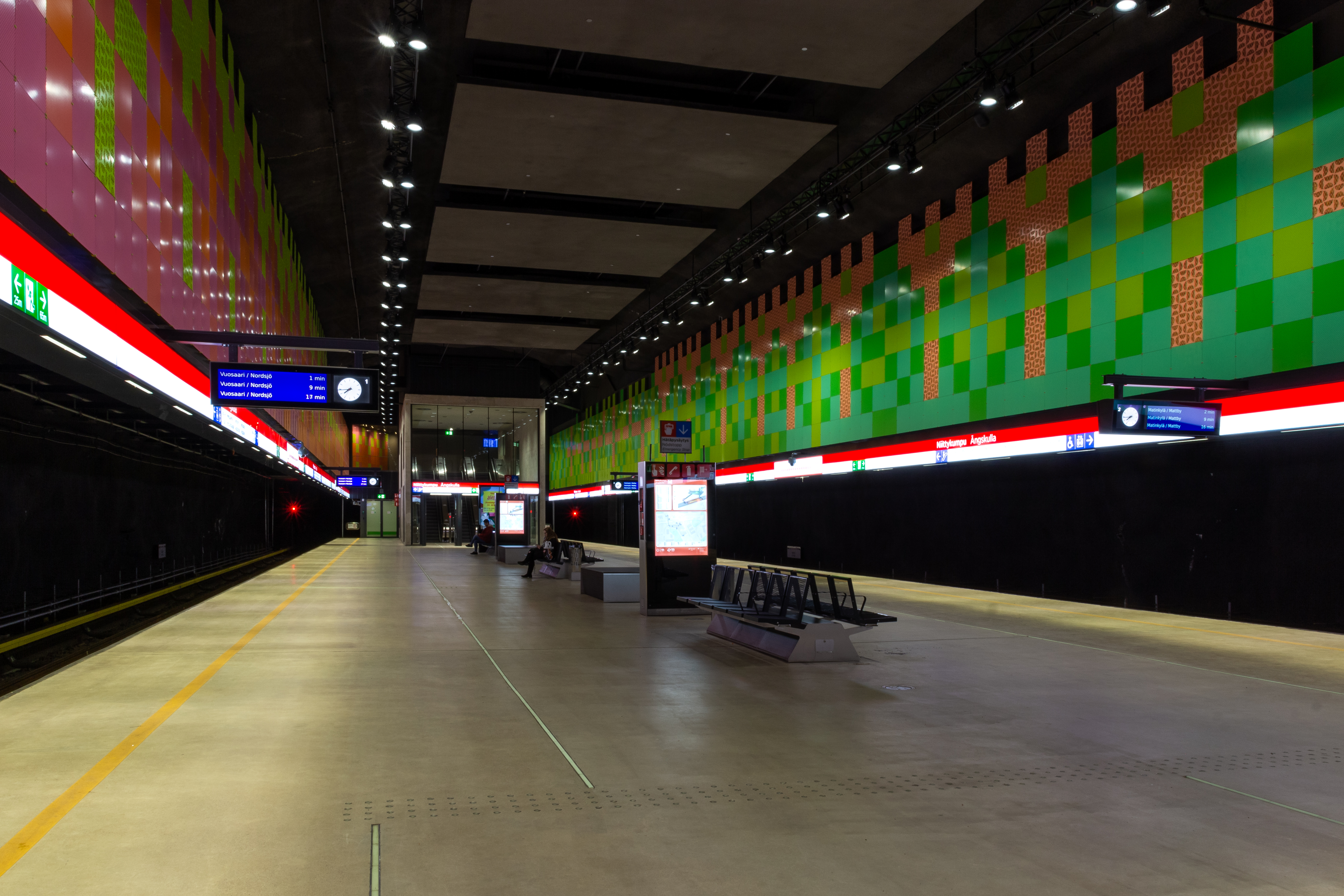
- Niittykumpu metro station in March 2019.

General information
- Location: Niittykatu 2 Niittykumpu, Espoo
- Coordinates: 60°10′14″N 24°45′48″E
- System: Helsinki Metro station
- Platforms: Island platform
- Tracks: 2
- Connections: HSL buses 112, 118/B, 119, 124, 125/B/N, 134N

Construction
- Structure type: Deep single-vault
- Accessible: Yes

Other information
- Fare zone: B

History
- Opened: 18 November 2017

Passengers
- 7,600 daily

Services
Preceding station	Helsinki Metro	Following station
Matinkylä towards Kivenlahti	M1	Urheilupuisto towards Vuosaari
Location

Niittykumpu (Finnish) or Ängskulla (Swedish) is an underground station on the western metro extension (Länsimetro) of the Helsinki Metro.

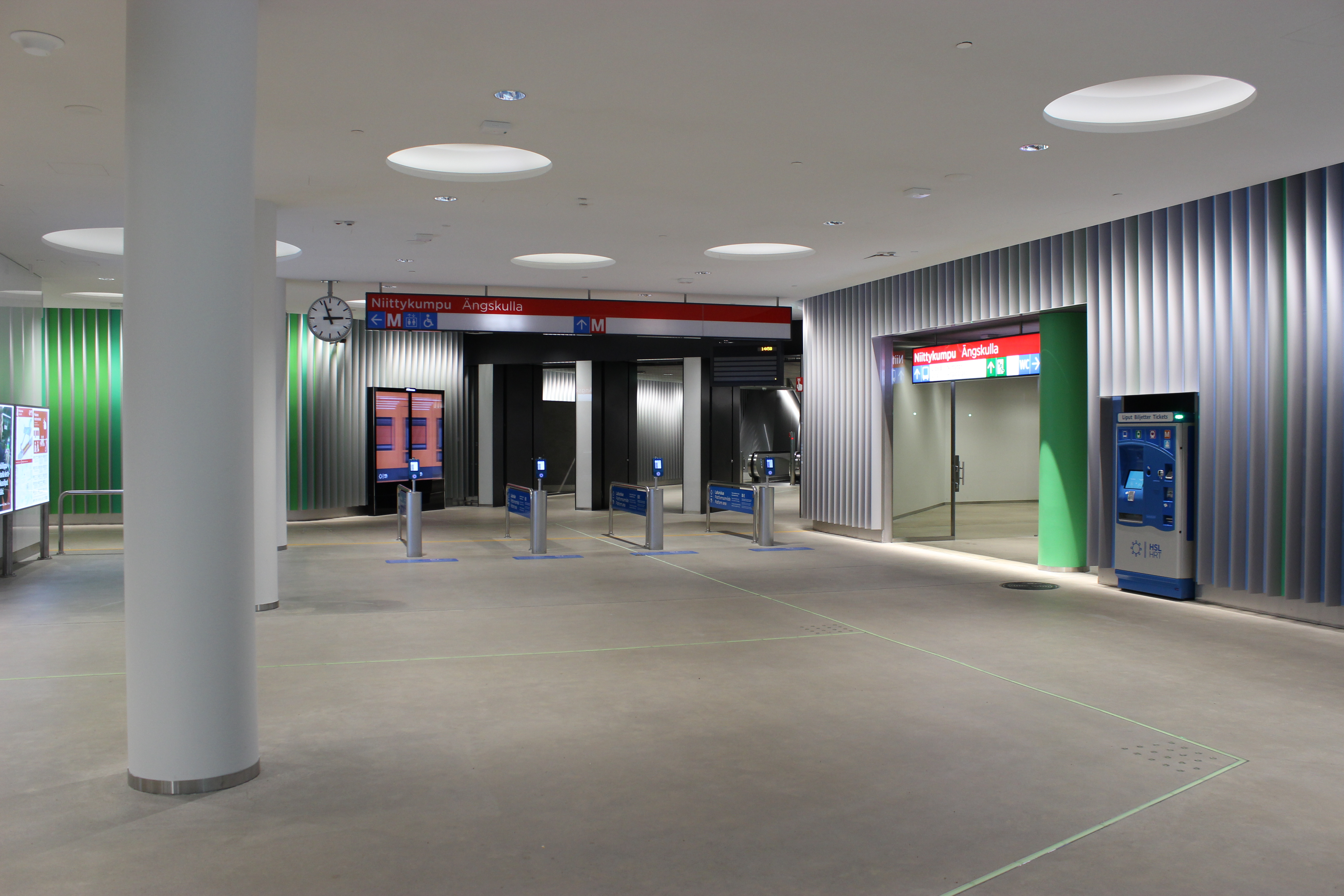
Ticket hall of the Niittykumpu metro station
