= Suur-Tapiola =

Suur-Tapiola Stor-Hagalund
- District of Espoo
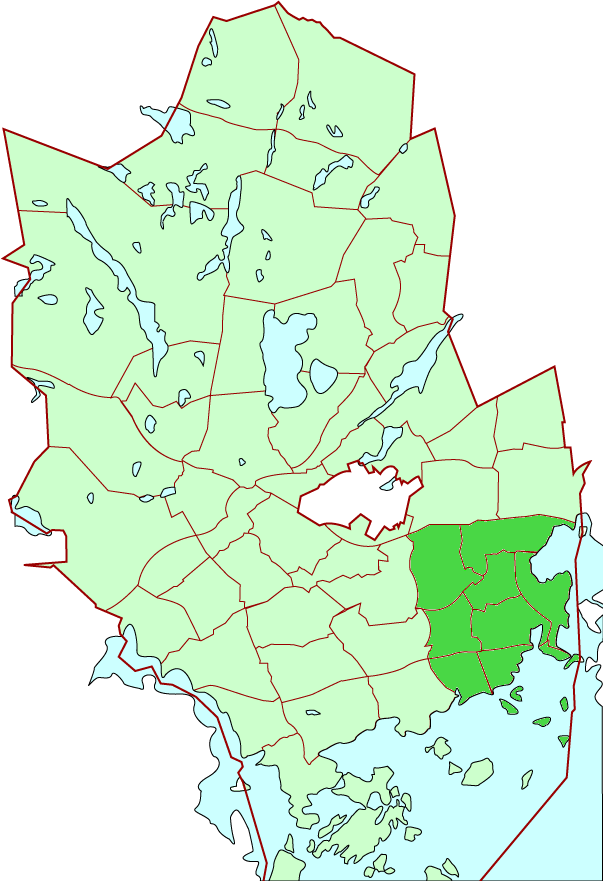
- Location of Suur-Tapiola within Espoo
- Coordinates: 60.18°N 24.80°E
- Country: Finland
- Municipality: Espoo
- Region: Uusimaa
- Sub-region: Greater Helsinki
- Main District: Suur-Tapiola

Population (2021)
  - Total: 51,990

Languages
  - Finnish: 87.1 %
  - Swedish: 8.7 %
  - Other: 4.2 %

Suur-Tapiola (Swedish: Stor-Hagalund, "Greater Tapiola") is a south-eastern main district of Espoo, a city in Finland.

It contains the districts Haukilahti, Laajalahti, Mankkaa, Niittykumpu, Otaniemi, Pohjois-Tapiola, Tapiola and Westend.

== See also ==
- Districts of Espoo
