= Westend tennis hall =

Former tennis centre in Espoo, Finland

Coordinates: 60°10′13.58″N 24°48′13.11″E

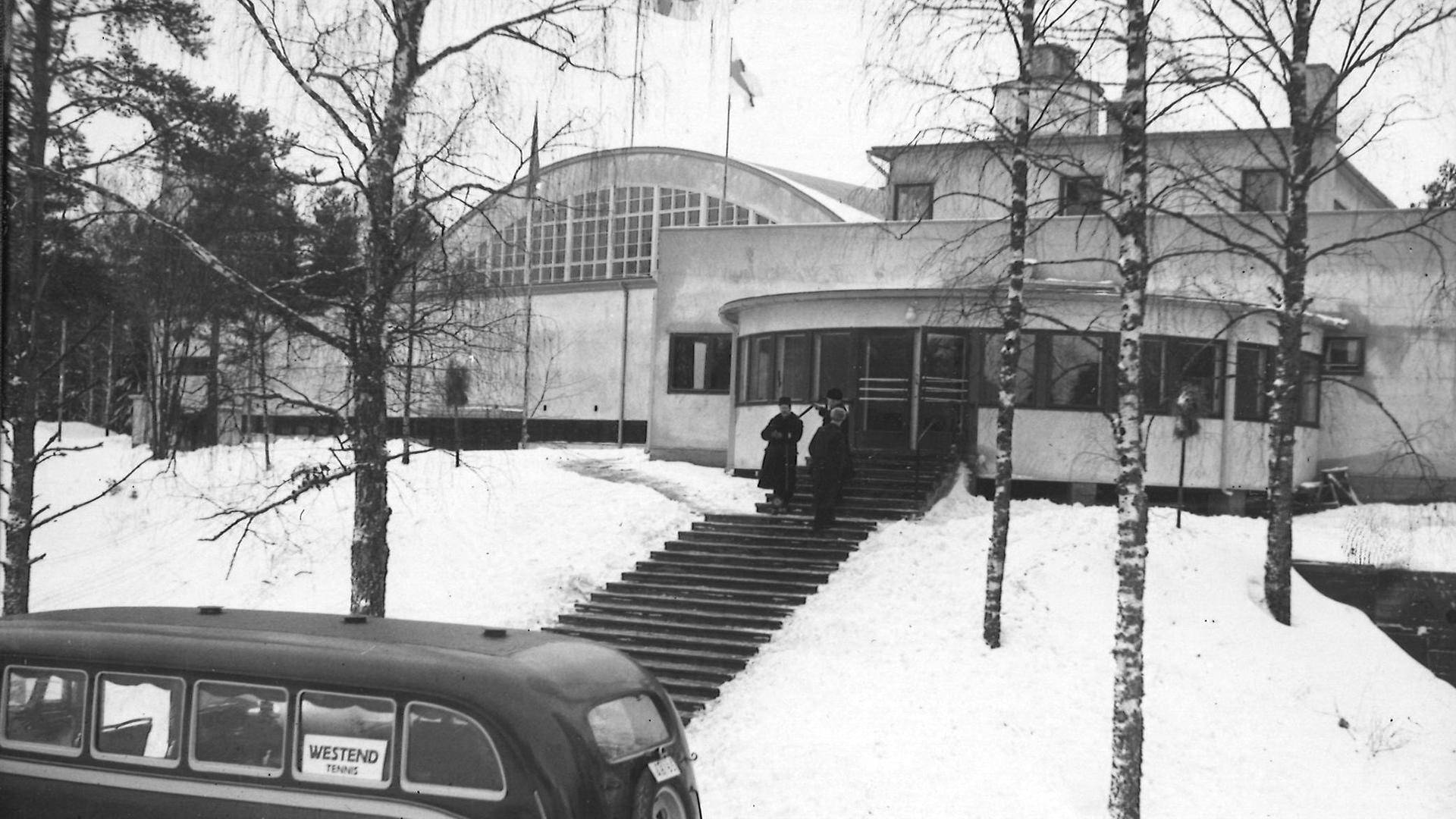
The Westend tennis hall in 1936.

The Westend tennis hall was a tennis centre located in the Westend district of Espoo, Finland. The tennis hall was designed by architect Jarl Eklund and completed in 1935. It was commissioned by Arne Grahn, Olympic tennis player and owner of the Hagalund manor.

== History ==
The Westend tennis hall had two indoor tennis courts and eight mass-covered outdoor courts. The hall also included office spaces, accommodation and club spaces as well as a restaurant. The Swedish-speaking tennis club Westend Tennis Stadion Klubb was founded in connection with the tennis hall in 1937.

The original tennis activity in the hall proved to be short-lived. In 1949 Grahn sold the hall to the Finnish Central Association for Agriculture and Forestry Producers, which used the hall as a training facility. In 1952 it served as one of the venues of the 1952 Summer Olympics in Helsinki, hosting the fencing competitions. After the Olympics, the hall returned to its original purpose until the middle 1960s. It served its last years as a school, until it was destroyed in a fire in January 1967. The site of the building now belongs to the district of Tapiola, and the head office of the LähiTapiola insurance company has been built in the hall's place. The adjacent street was long known as Tennispolku, until it was renamed Revontulentie in 1975.

=== Dismissal of Jewish members ===
In May 1939 the Swedish-speaking tennis club Westend Tennis Stadion Klubb based in the Westend tennis hall dismissed six Jewish members. According to club chairman Arne Grahn, the reason for the dismissal was failure to pay membership fees. The real reason was suspected to be antisemitism, as there had been over 120 members who had failed to pay their membership fees, but only the Jewish members were dismissed. The event was published in several Finnish newspapers and also attracted attention in Sweden.

Among the dismissed members were Jack S. Kotschack and Boris Grünstein, owner of the Grünstein fur shop. In his 1989 memoir Juutalaisena Suomessa ("As a Jew in Finland") he mentioned that Grahn had later apologised for his dismissal. Grahn has said that the reason was pressure from abroad, as the tennis club had close ties to German coaches in the 1930s. The matter came into publicity again in 1945, when a Swedish tennis club had planned to come as a visitor for the Westend Tennis Stadion Klubb. After the Swedish newspaper Expressen had written about the 1939 event, the club ended up cancelling their visit.
