= Villa Elfvik =

Coordinates: 60°12′07″N 024°49′21″E

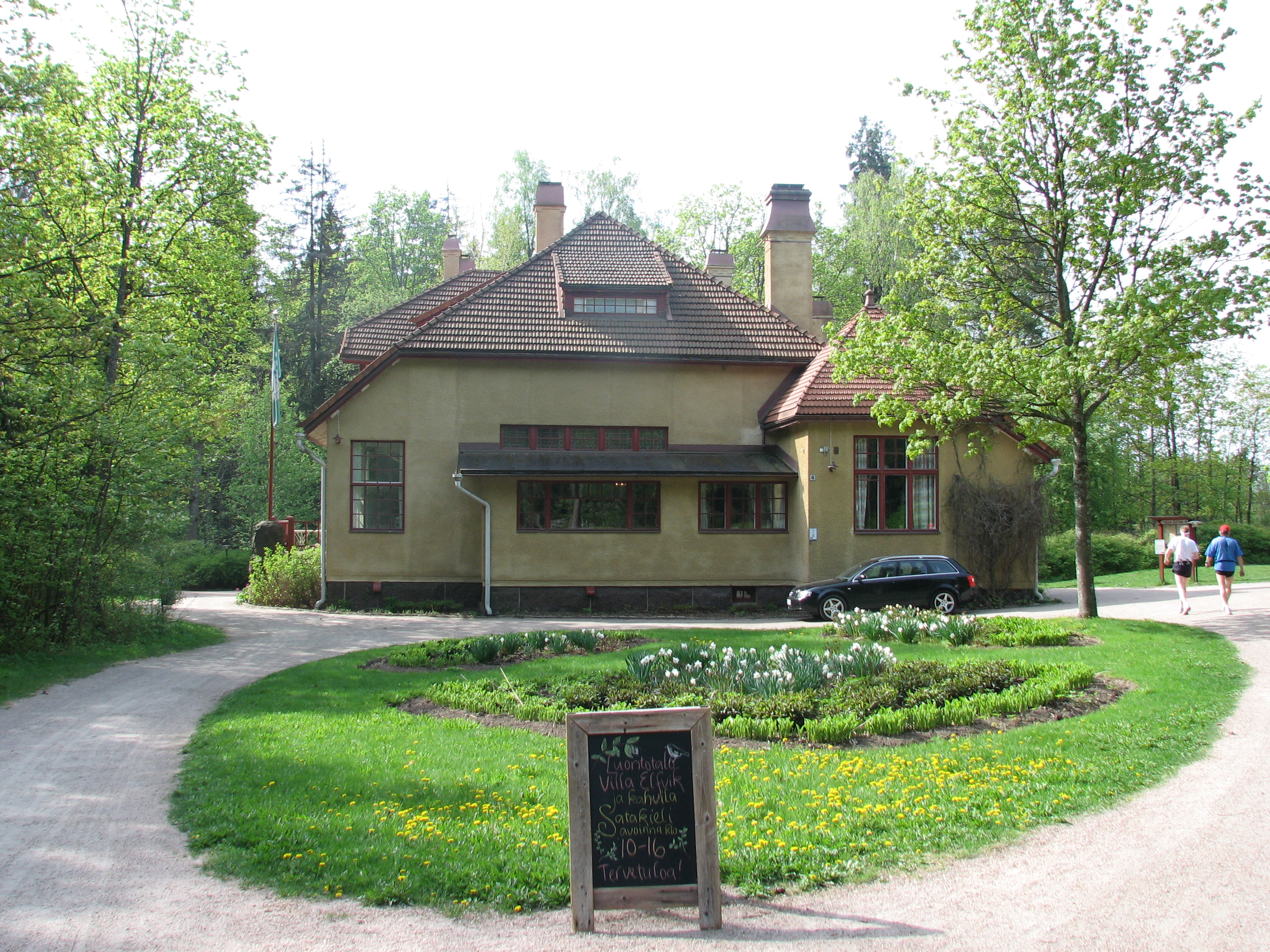
Villa Elfvik.

The Villa Elfvik nature house is an environmental education centre in Espoo, Finland, directed at all residents of Espoo. The nature house offers information about nature and the environment in all forms.

Jugend style Villa Elfvik was designed by the architect Mauritz Gripenberg. The construction project finished in 1904. The villa was built to be a home for baroness Elvira Standertskjöld.

Villa Elfvik is located in Laajalahti near the seashore, between the commercial centres of Tapiola and Leppävaara.
