= Urheilupuisto metro station =

Helsinki Metro station

Urheilupuisto Idrottsparken
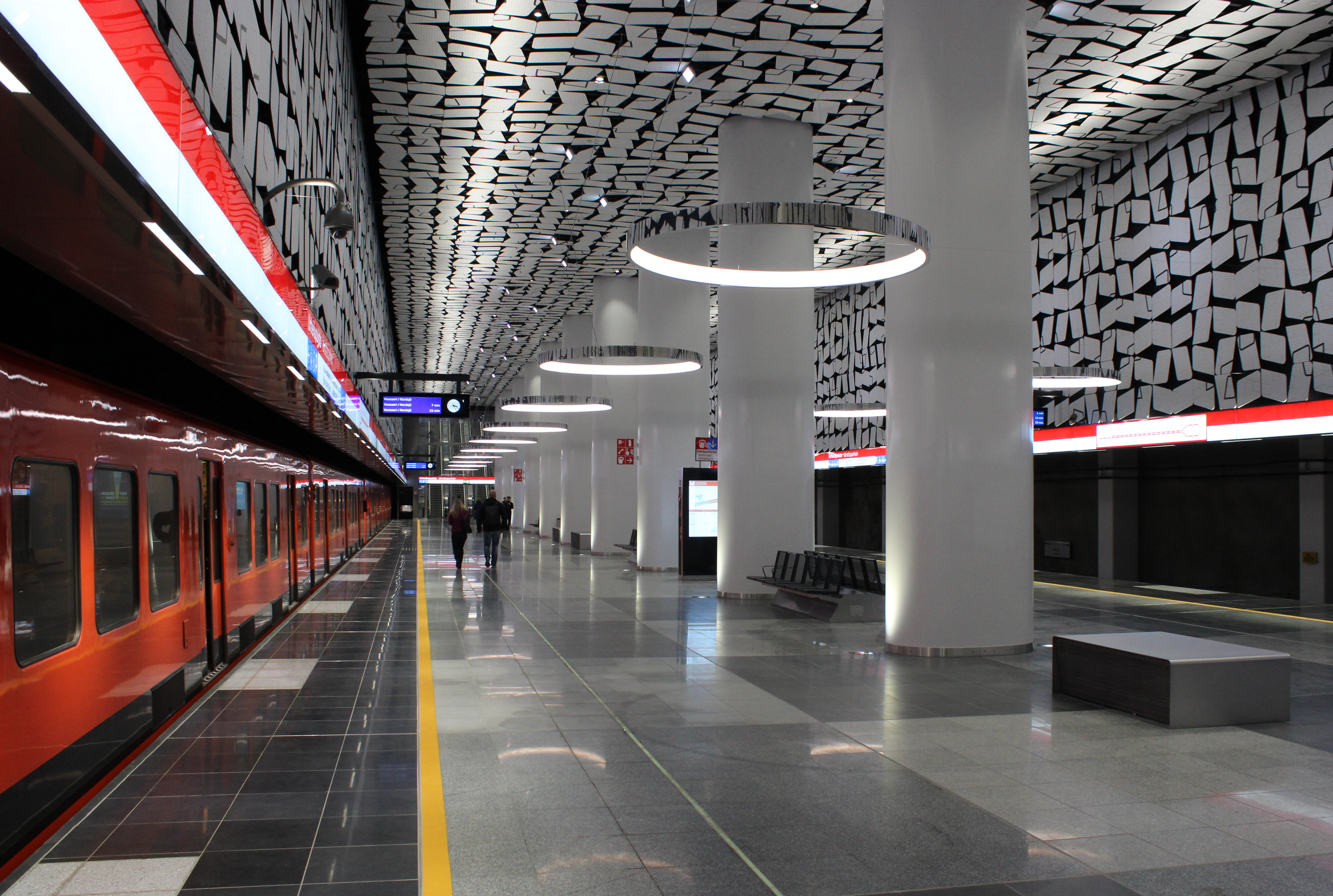
- The Urheilupuisto metro station in November 2017.

General information
- Location: Jousenpuistonkatu 2 Tapiola, Espoo
- Coordinates: 60°10′N 24°47′E
- System: Helsinki metro station
- Owner: Helsinki City Transport
- Platforms: island platform
- Tracks: 2
- Connections: HSL buses 114, 115/A, 118N, 119

Construction
- Structure type: Deep single-vault
- Depth: 27 metres (89 ft)
- Accessible: Yes

Other information
- Fare zone: B

History
- Opened: 18 November 2017

Passengers
- 7,000 daily

Services
Preceding station	Helsinki Metro	Following station
Niittykumpu towards Kivenlahti	M1	Tapiola towards Vuosaari
Location

Urheilupuisto (Finnish) or Idrottsparken (Swedish) (lit. English "Sports park") is an underground metro station on the Länsimetro (‘Western Metro’) extension of Helsinki metro, in the Otaniemi district of Espoo, Finland. The station is located in western Tapiola, at the northern edge of Jousenpuisto Park and south of the Tapiolan Urheilupuisto (Swedish: Hagalunds idrottspark; ‘Tapiola Sports Park‘). A 790-space car park was built next to the metro station and offers elevator access to the station.

The station was designed by HKP Architects, in collaboration with many other design firms. During the design stage, the station was known as Jousenpuisto, after the park at its immediate south. The shape of the station building allows natural light to enter at street level and reach down to the platform level via the escalators. The metro station has won several international design awards as part of the eight-station first phase of the Länsimetro.

Urheilupuisto is unique among metro stations in Espoo, as it is not built into the bedrock. The station platform is located at a depth of about 27 meters below street level. Urheilupuisto station was designed to operate with only one entrance (on the western side of the building) but, in response to passenger feedback, an entrance was constructed in the eastern side and opened on 29 February 2020. The station is located 1.1 kilometres east from Niittykumpu metro station and 1.3 kilometres west from Tapiola metro station.

== Pictures ==
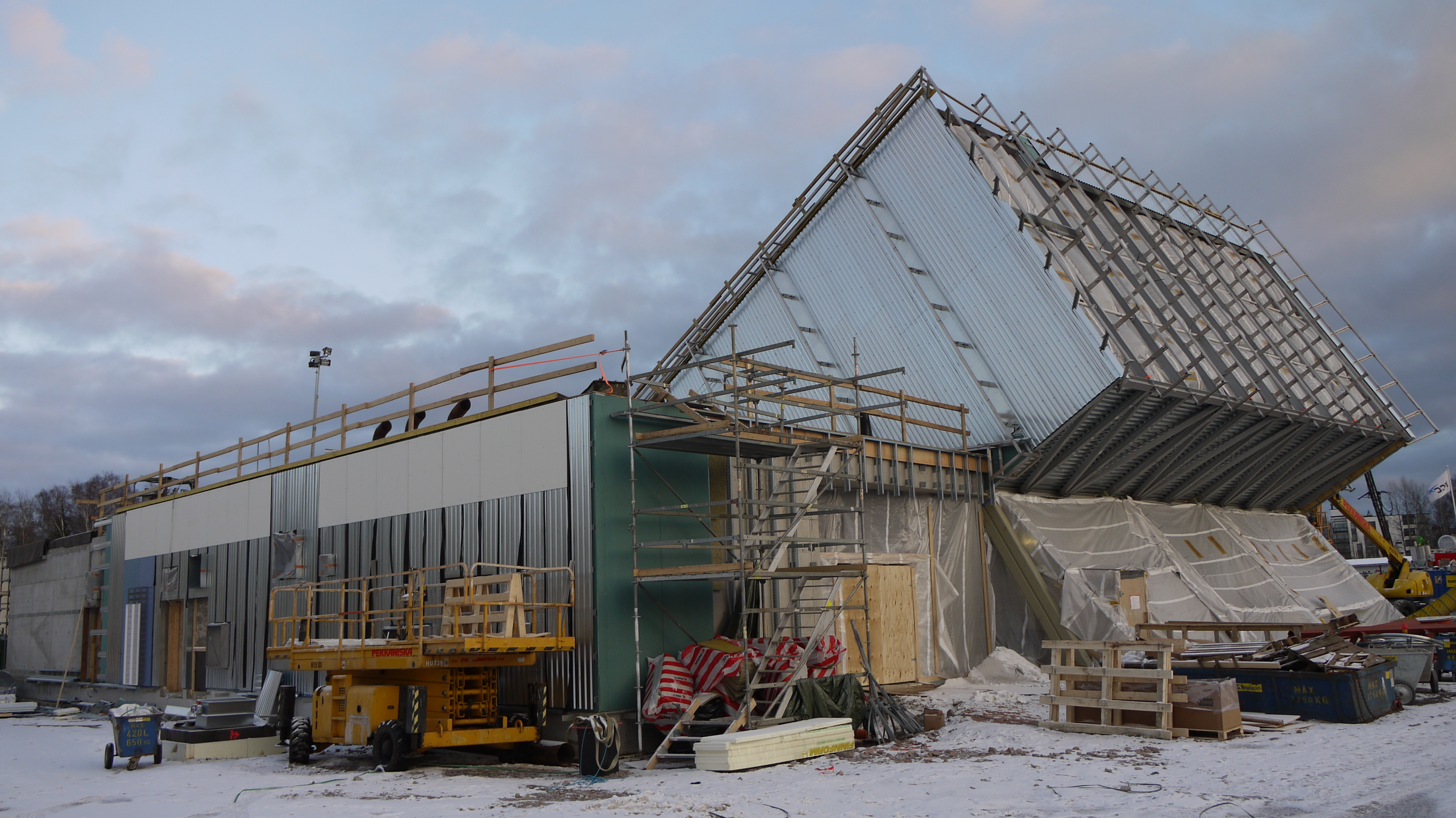
The metro station construction site, 2016

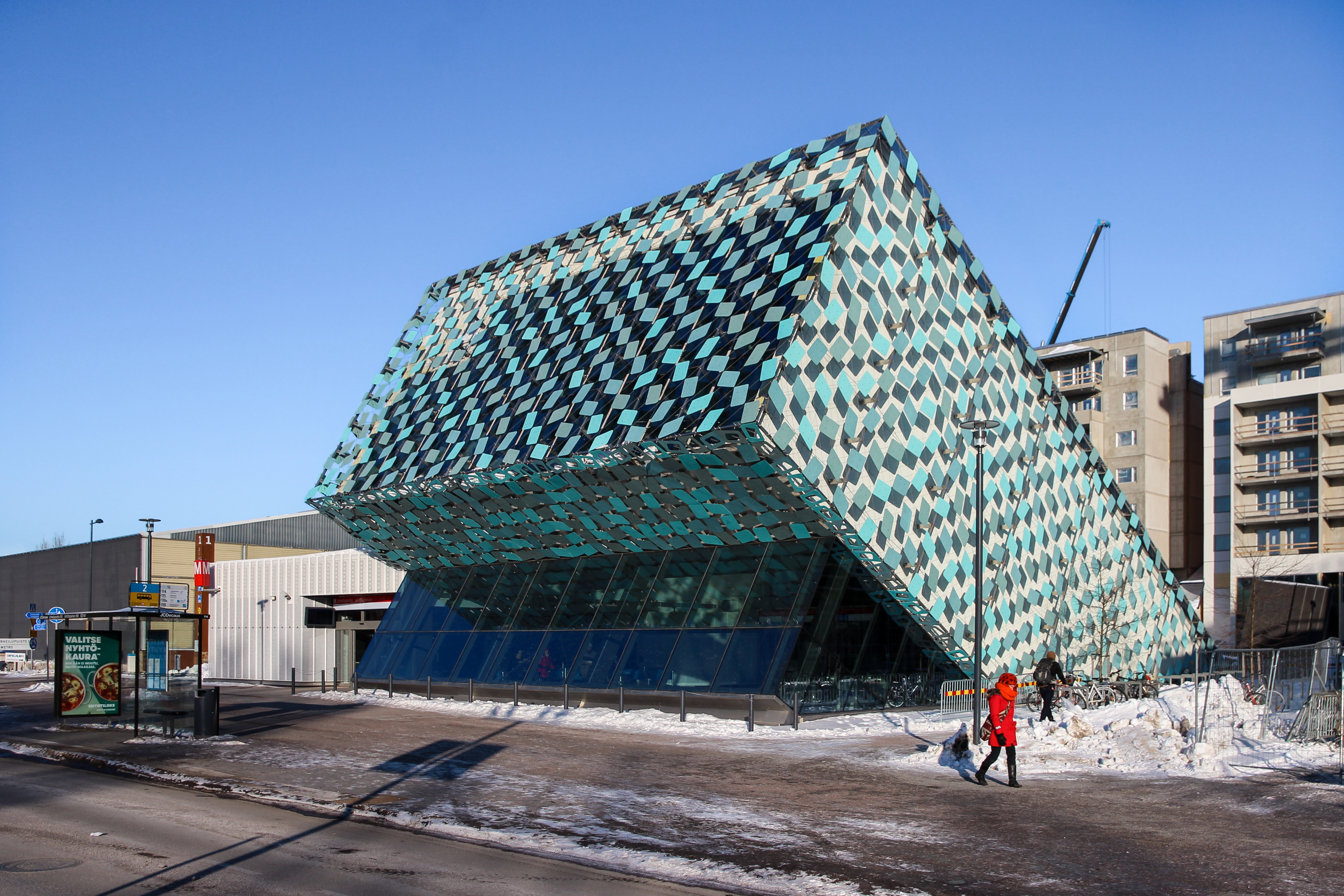
The entrance of the metro station, February 2018

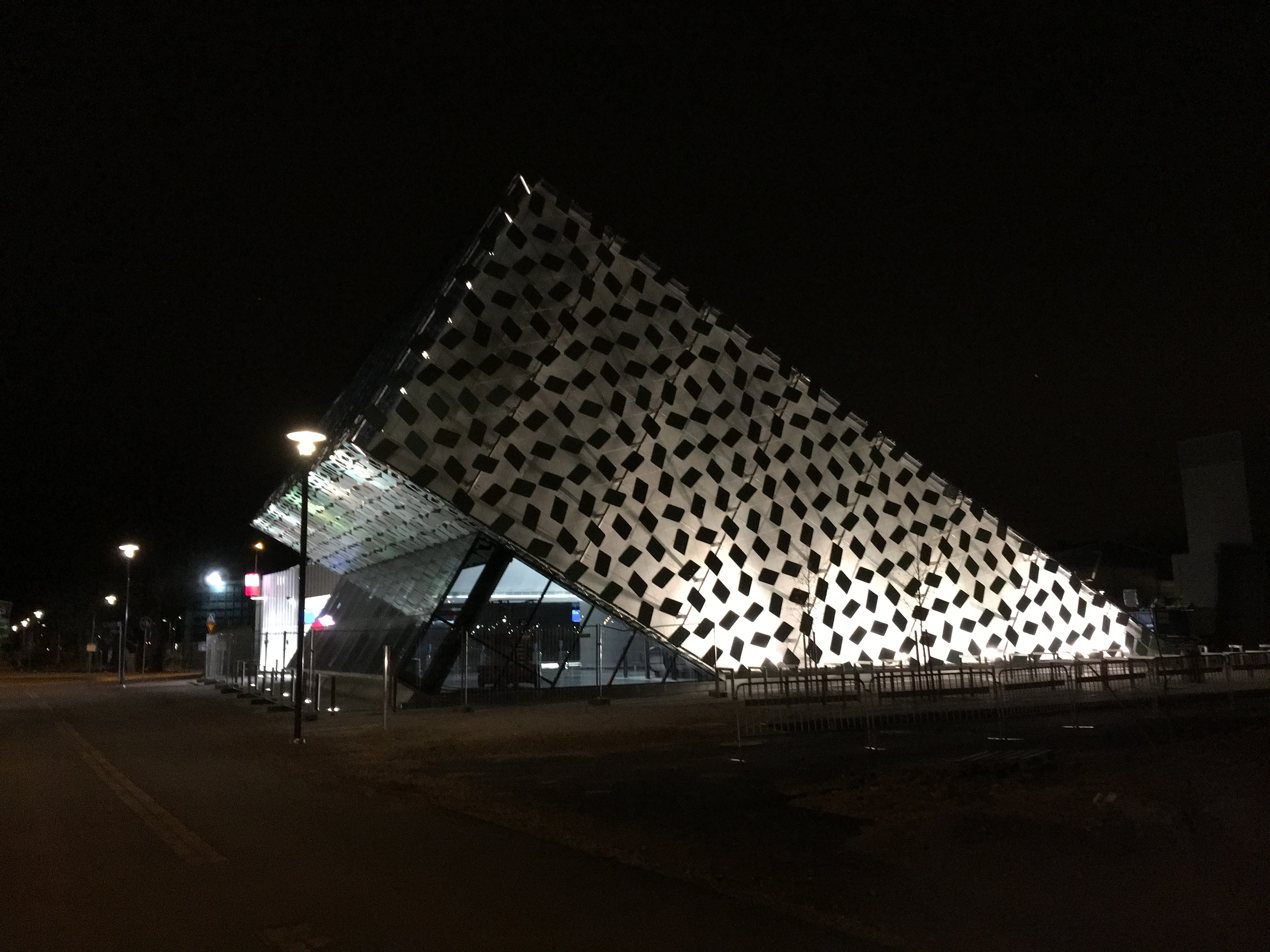
The entrance of the metro station at night, March 2017

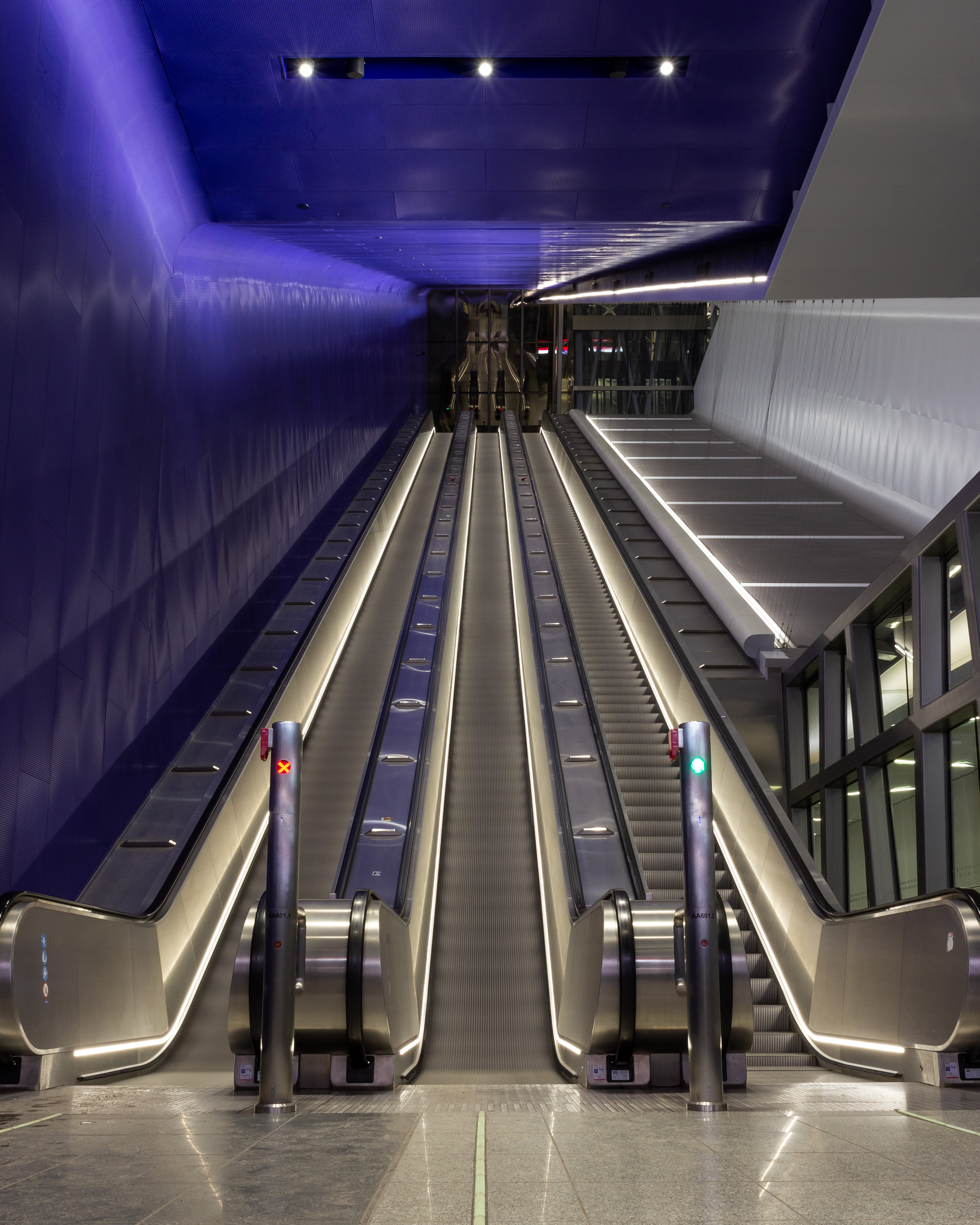
The station's escalators, November 2018
