= Pohjois-Tapiola =

Pohjois-Tapiola Norra Hagalund
- District of Espoo
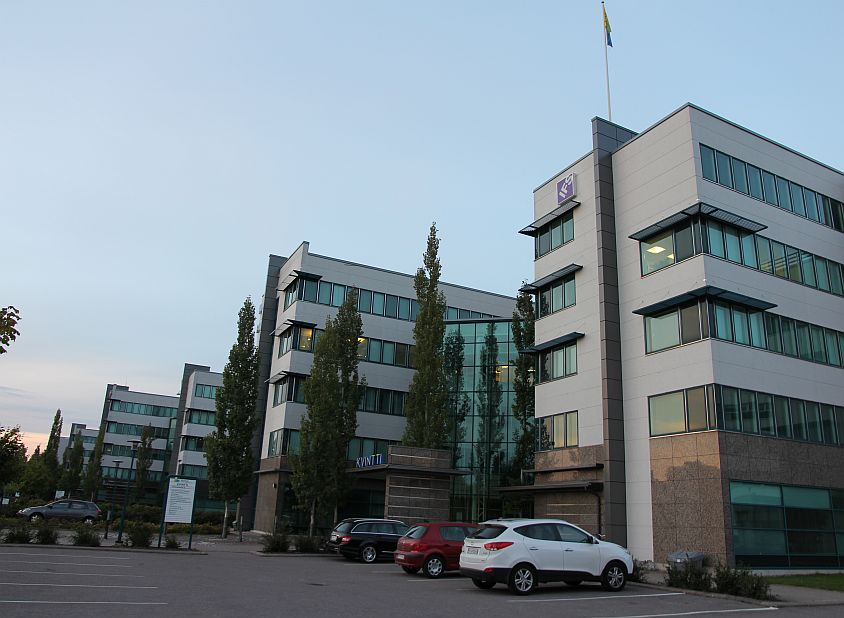
- Buildings of Spektri, a business park in Pohjois-Tapiola

- Location of Pohjois-Tapiola (red) within Espoo (light green) and Suur-Tapiola (dark green)
- Coordinates: 60°11′45″N 24°47′30″E
- Country: Finland
- Region: Uusimaa
- Sub-region: Greater Helsinki
- Municipality: Espoo
- Main District: Suur-Tapiola

Area
  - Total: 2.2 km^{2} (0.85 sq mi)

Population (2006)
  - Total: 6,035
  - Density: 2,700/km^{2} (7,100/sq mi)

Languages
  - Finnish: 91.8 %
  - Swedish: 5.3 %
  - Other: 2.9 %
- Postal Code(s): 02130
- Jobs: 2,513

Pohjois-Tapiola (Swedish: Norra Hagalund) is a district of the municipality of Espoo, Finland.

== See also ==
- Districts of Espoo
