= Länsiväylä =

Motorway in Uusimaa, Finland

Coordinates: 60°10′06″N 024°47′40″E

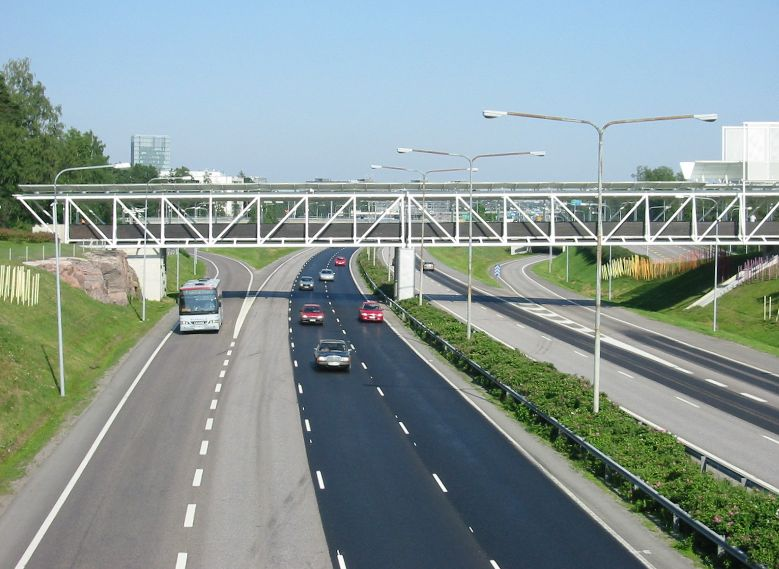
A view of Länsiväylä at Tapiola. Office buildings in Keilaniemi are visible on the left in the background.

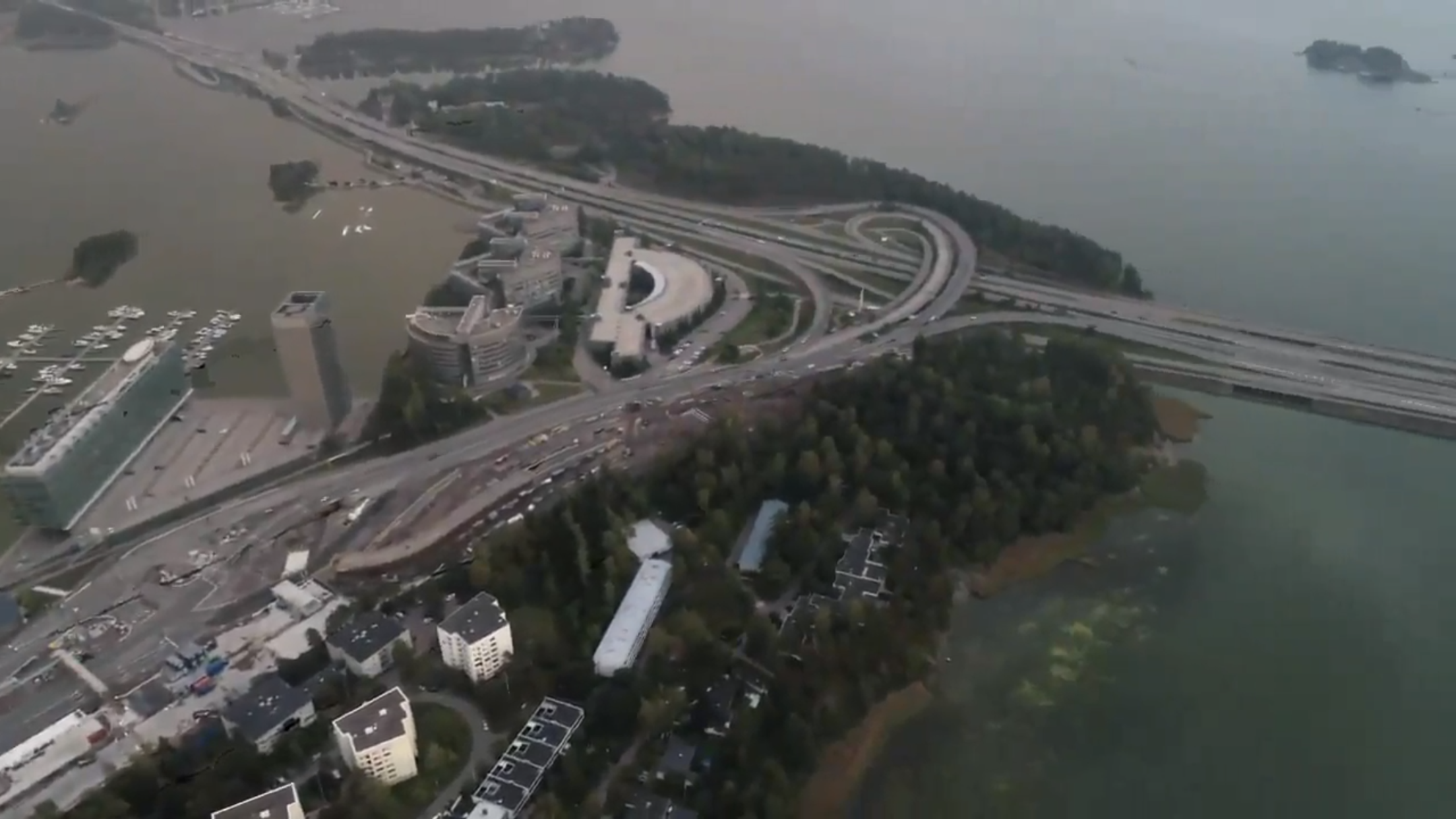
The intersection of Länsiväylä and Ring I in Keilaniemi.

Länsiväylä (the Western Highway, Swedish: Västerleden) is a motorway in the Greater Helsinki area of Finland, mainly at the Helsinki conurbation. It is part of the Finnish national road 51. The road begins in Ruoholahti in western Helsinki and continues west through the island of Lauttasaari and then across the city border to Espoo. The Länsiväylä road continues all the way throughout the southern part of Espoo. It continues as a motorway until finally crossing the border west to Kirkkonummi.

At the start of Länsiväylä is the Lapinlahti bridge built in 1965, which was the longest bridge in Finland for a long time. In September 2013 the average daily traffic over the bridge was 56,710 cars, according to calculations by the city of Helsinki.

Länsiväylä is perhaps the most important connection between the cities of Helsinki and Espoo. Almost all bus and private car traffic between central Helsinki and southern Espoo (such as the Tapiola and Otaniemi districts) passes along Länsiväylä. Along with the beltways Ring I and Ring III, it is one of the roads with heaviest traffic in the country. It was constructed as a motorway and compared to the beltways, has been much better suited to heavy traffic. An extensive bus rapid transit network utilized Länsiväylä, using special bus lanes. However, the Länsimetro extension of the Helsinki Metro, which was completed in autumn 2017, replaced most bus routes on Länsiväylä.

A similar road, the Itäväylä (Eastern Highway, Swedish: Österleden) begins at Sörnäinen and continues eastwards towards Sipoo.

== History ==
Building the highway started in 1961. The part between Ruoholahti and Gräsa (connection to Haukilahti in Espoo) was opened on 1 October 1965, and in the next year it was extended to Suomenoja. The highway reached Espoonlahti in 1969. The newest part from Kivenlahti to Kirkkonummi was opened for traffic on 29 October 2013. The highway was originally supposed to reach over Porkkalankatu over Hietalahdenranta and the former Helsinki harbour rail to Lönnrotinkatu and Uudenmaankatu. The Mallaskatu tunnel cutting underneath the Sinebrychoff park is a remnanet of this plan. The tunnel was supposed to become the western entrance ramp to the centre of Helsinki. Another remnant is the correction to the highway route in Salmisaari, where the highway originally branched off in order to continue straight over Porkkalankatu. Originally also Mechelininkatu had a direct connection to Länsiväylä from the northern side. Removing the connection has caused massive traffic problems, even though the greatest problems are caused by the pedestrian crossing with traffic lights and difficult public transport solutions in front of the ramp south of Mechelininkatu.

The predecessor of Länsiväylä from 1933 to 1938 was Jorvaksentie, a two-lane highway leading from Helsinki to Jorvas in Kirkkonummi. Parts of the highway on the Helsinki end acting as parts of the same connection were a causeway leading from Ruoholahti to Salmisaari, as well as the original Lauttasaari bridge leading to Lauttasaari and the Lauttasaarentie street going through the entire island of Lauttasaari, which got its current name already in 1938. Jorvaksentie proper began from the western end of Lauttasaarentie, which went over bridges and causeways via the islands of Koivusaari and Hanasaari to Karhusaari in Espoo, where it continued through southern Espoo to Espoonlahti, which it went over on the Muulo bridge, and further onto Kirkkonummi up to Jorvas. There it joined the old King's Road going through Muurala and Kauklahti.

When the new highway numbering system was taken into use in 1938, Jorvaksentie became part of Finnish national road 51. Its westernmost part was left in the Porkkala Naval Base in 1944, so the national road had to be rerouted via Kauklahti and Siuntio. Jorvaksentie later lost its status as a national road, but in 1972 Länsiväylä became a part of the national road 51 again.

As southern Espoo grew in population, Jorvaksentie became hopelessly insufficient, so a motor highway was built to replace it. The part of the highway from the western part of Lauttasaari to the Kivenlahti connection, also known as Martinsilta, was built in place of the original Jorvaksentie by widening it and converting the intersections into interchanges, whereas the parts from Ruoholahti to Lauttasaari and from Martinsilta to the Espoonlahti bridge were built as new roads.

The part of the highway in Helsinki was named Länsiväylä already in the planning stage in 1961. In Espoo the road was still named Jorvaksentie when the highway was built, but the name Länsiväylä was later also taken into use in Espoo. The road is still sometimes referred to as Jorvaksentie, but this name officially only refers to the part of national road 51 in Kirkkonummi.

=== Construction of parallel roads ===
At the same time as the highway was built, a parallel street was built to the north of it, leading from Tapiola to Martinsilta. It is named Merituulentie from Tapiola to Ring II, Kuitinmäentie from Ring II to the Suomenoja roundabout and Martinsillantie to the west of Suomenoja. The parallel roads to the west of Martinsilta are Kivenlahdentie and its continuation Vanha Jorvaksentie, which are parts of the original Jorvaksentie. There is no parallel road on Länsiväylä between Lauttasaari and Tapiola, so slow vehicles such as heavy machinery, which cannot travel on the motor highway or the light traffic way along it, have to circumvent the highway via Töölö, Munkkiniemi, Kuusisaari and Lehtisaari.

There have been new connections built to the beltways and Tapiola from time to time, and on its widest part between Tapiola and Westend the highway has 12 lanes. A new connection was built at the Iso Omena shopping centre between Matinkylä and Olari in the early 2000s.

There has been a parallel street to the south of Länsiväylä planned right from the start, but the connection to Haukilahti over Gräsanoja was only built in the early 2000s, and the parallel street Suomenlahdentie to Suomenoja was only built in 2016. There are separate ways for light traffic along Länsiväylä.

== Images ==
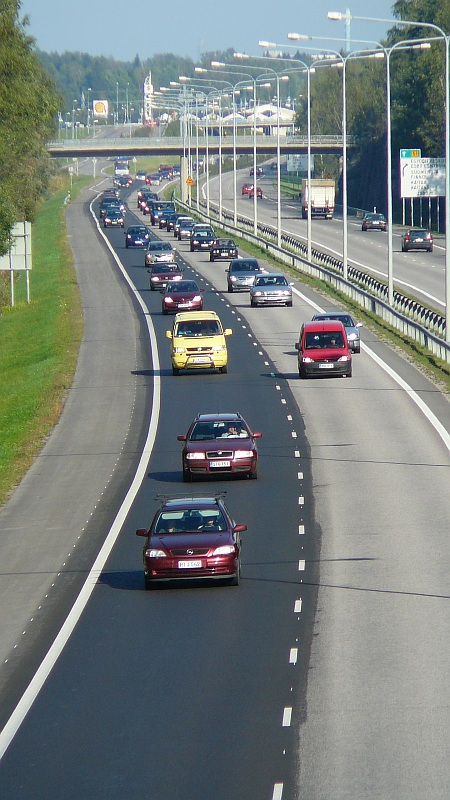
Länsiväylä besides of Nöykkiö, time of evening rush hour, behind intersection of Suomenoja

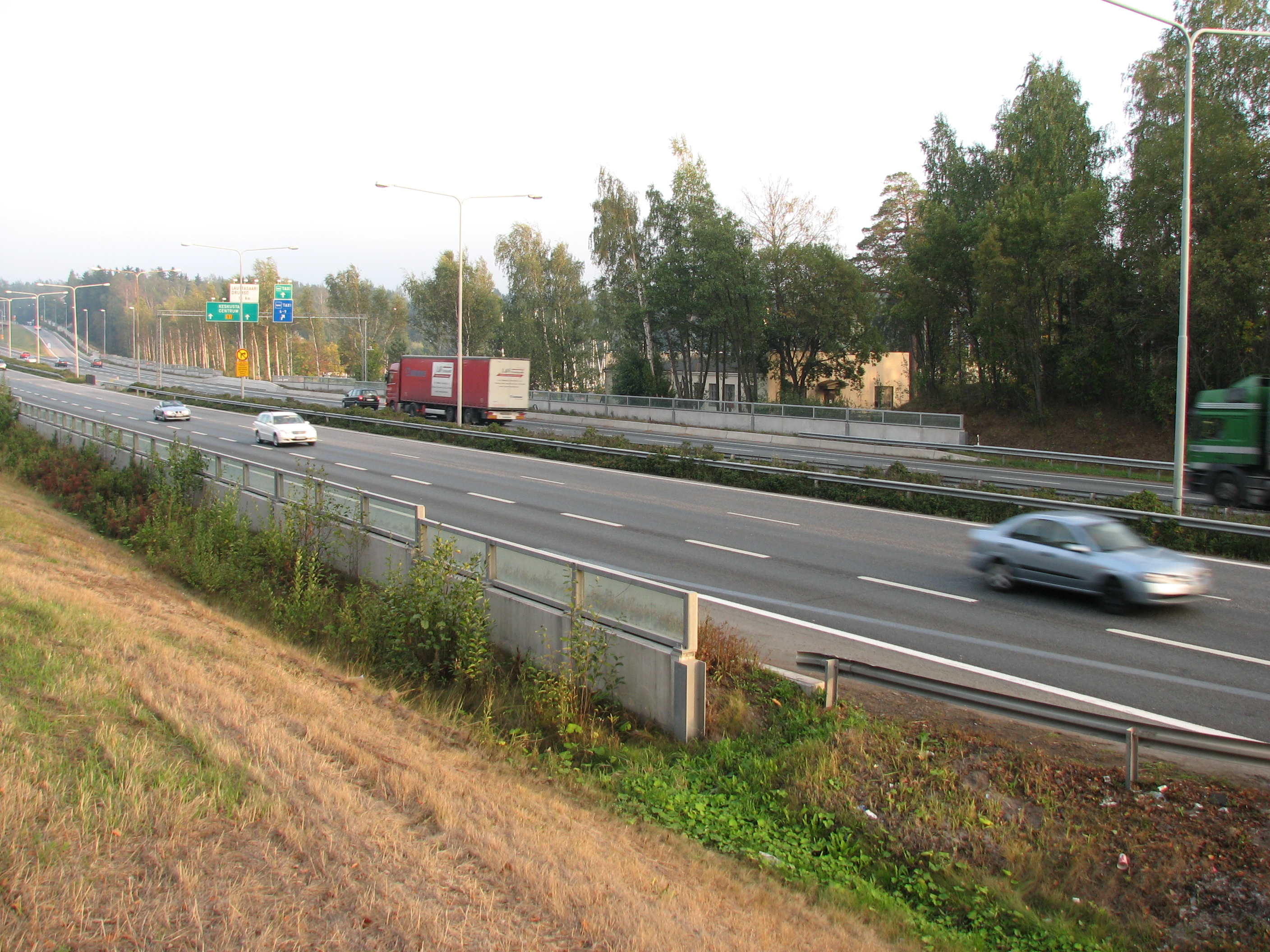
Länsiväylä, view from Koivusaari to the center of Helsinki

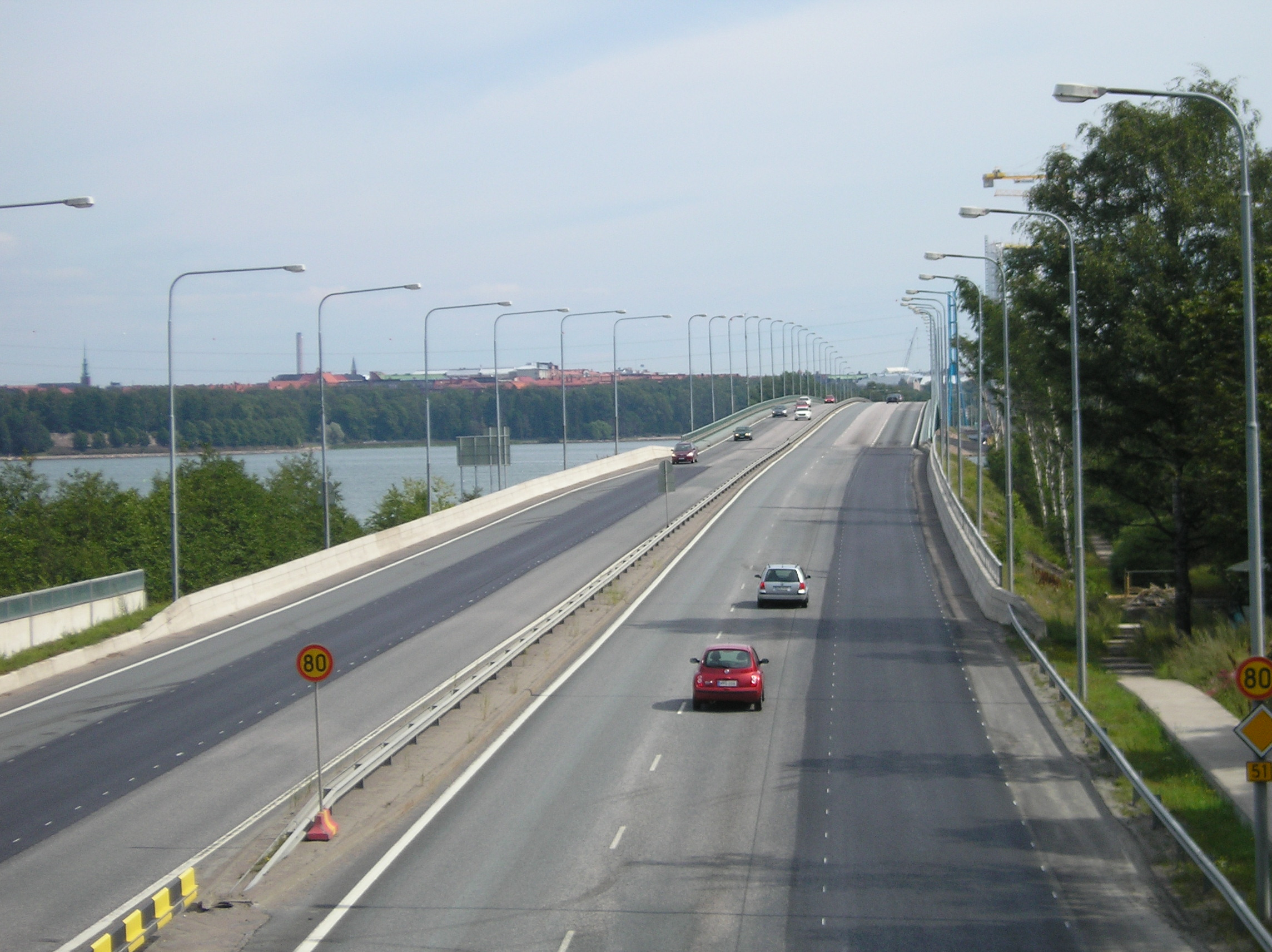
Länsiväylä, section of Lauttasaari

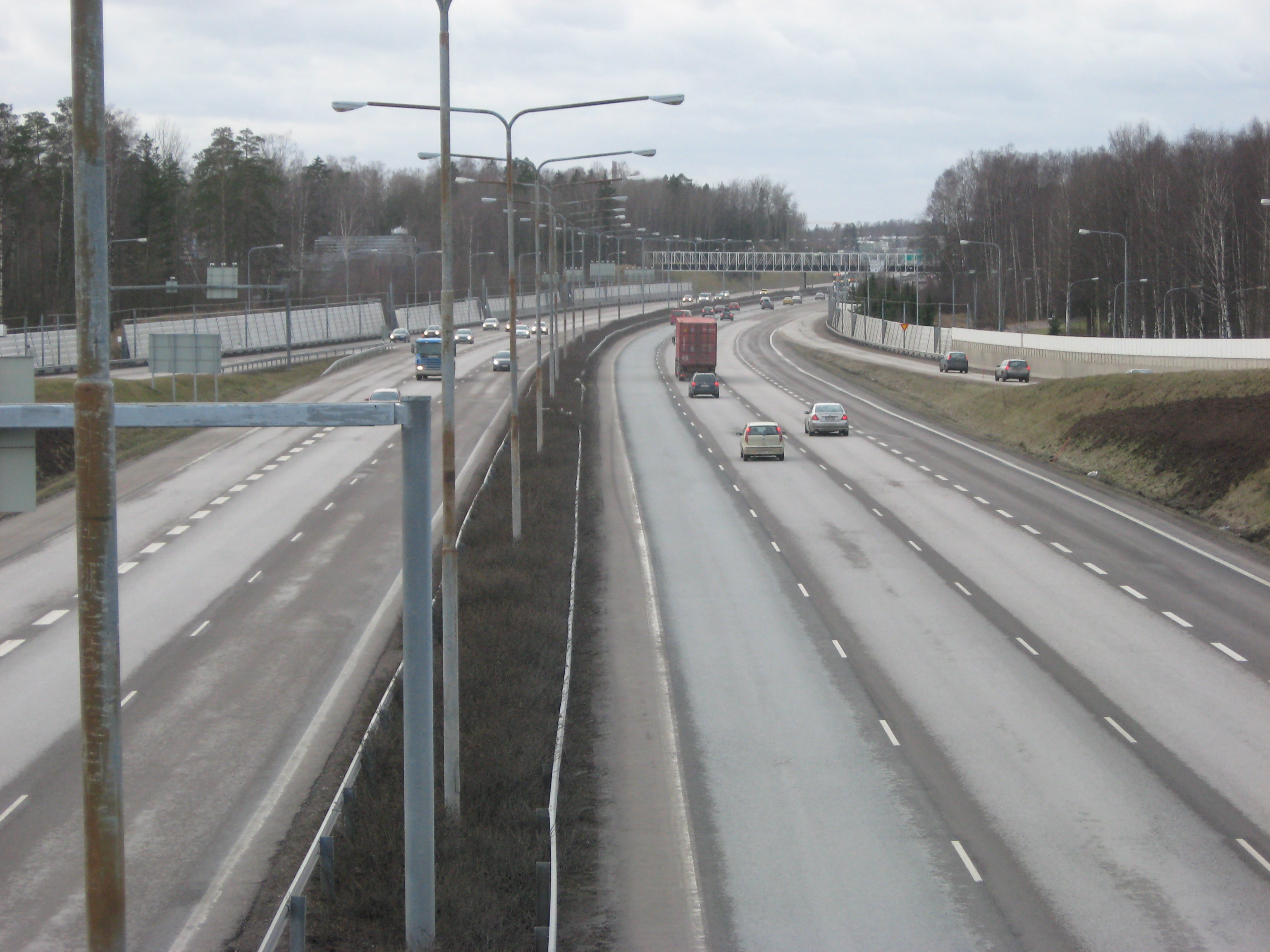
Länsiväylä next to Westend

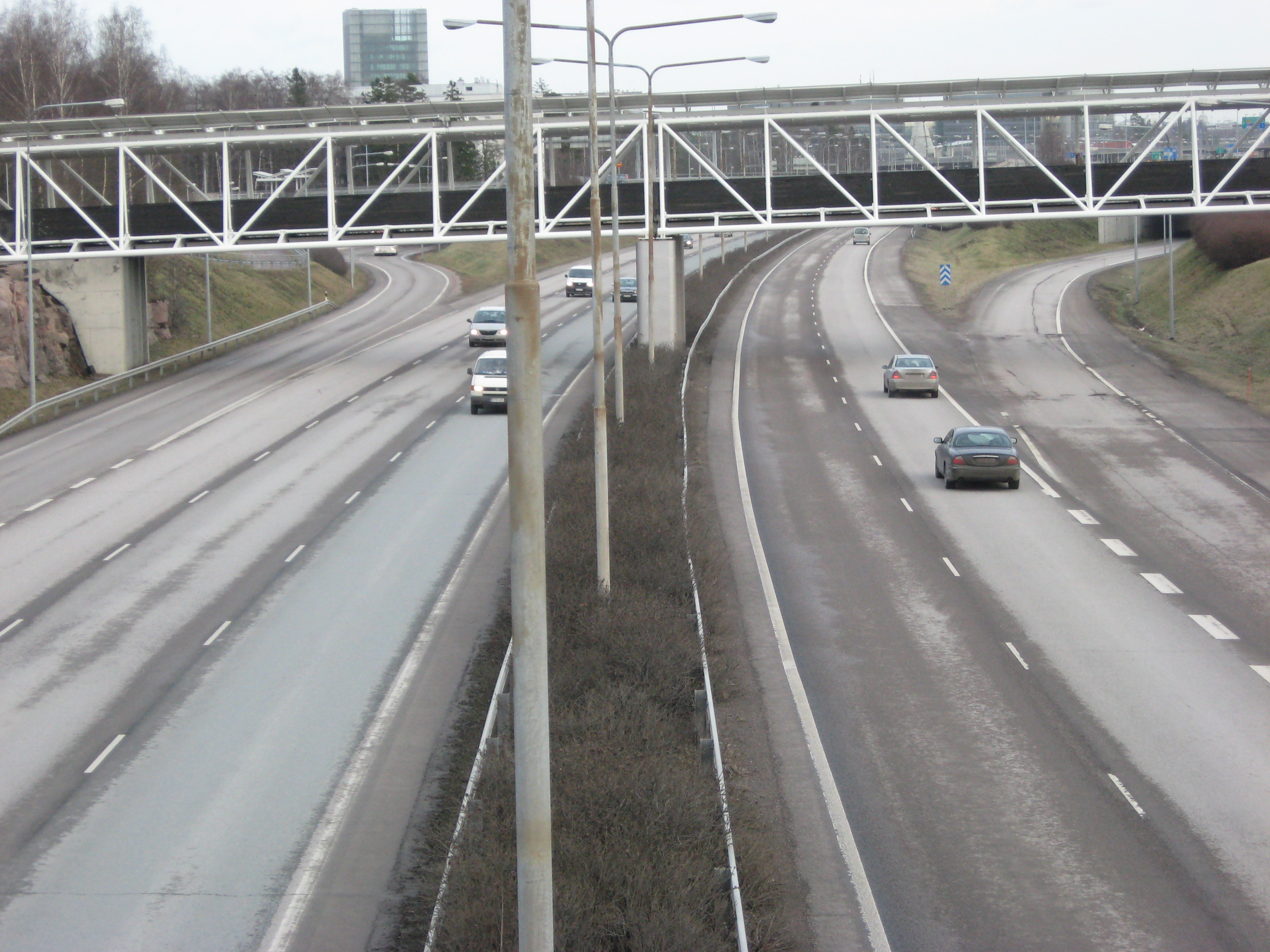
Länsiväylä next to Westend, view to Keilaniemi

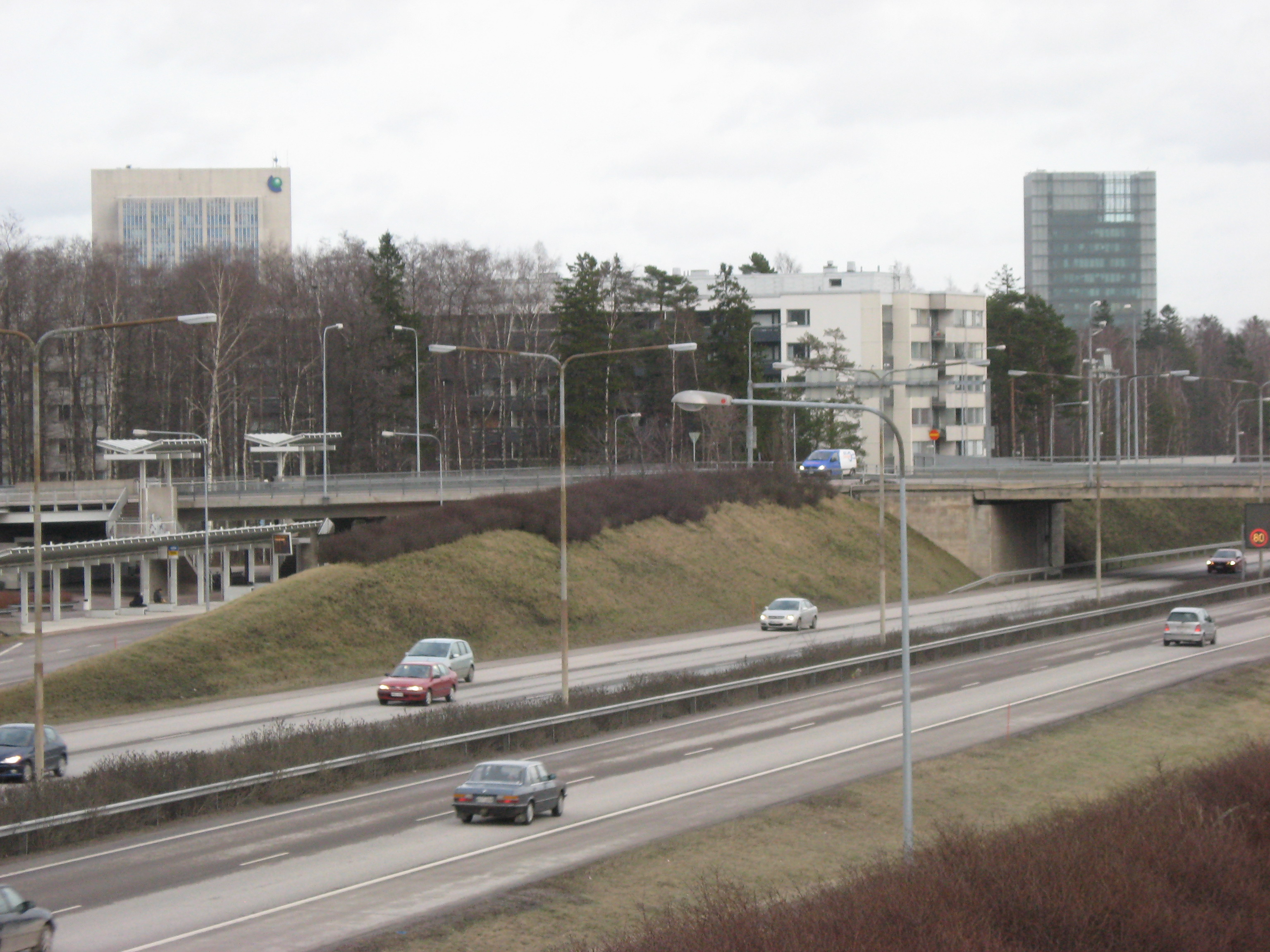
Länsiväylä and the towers of Keilaniemi

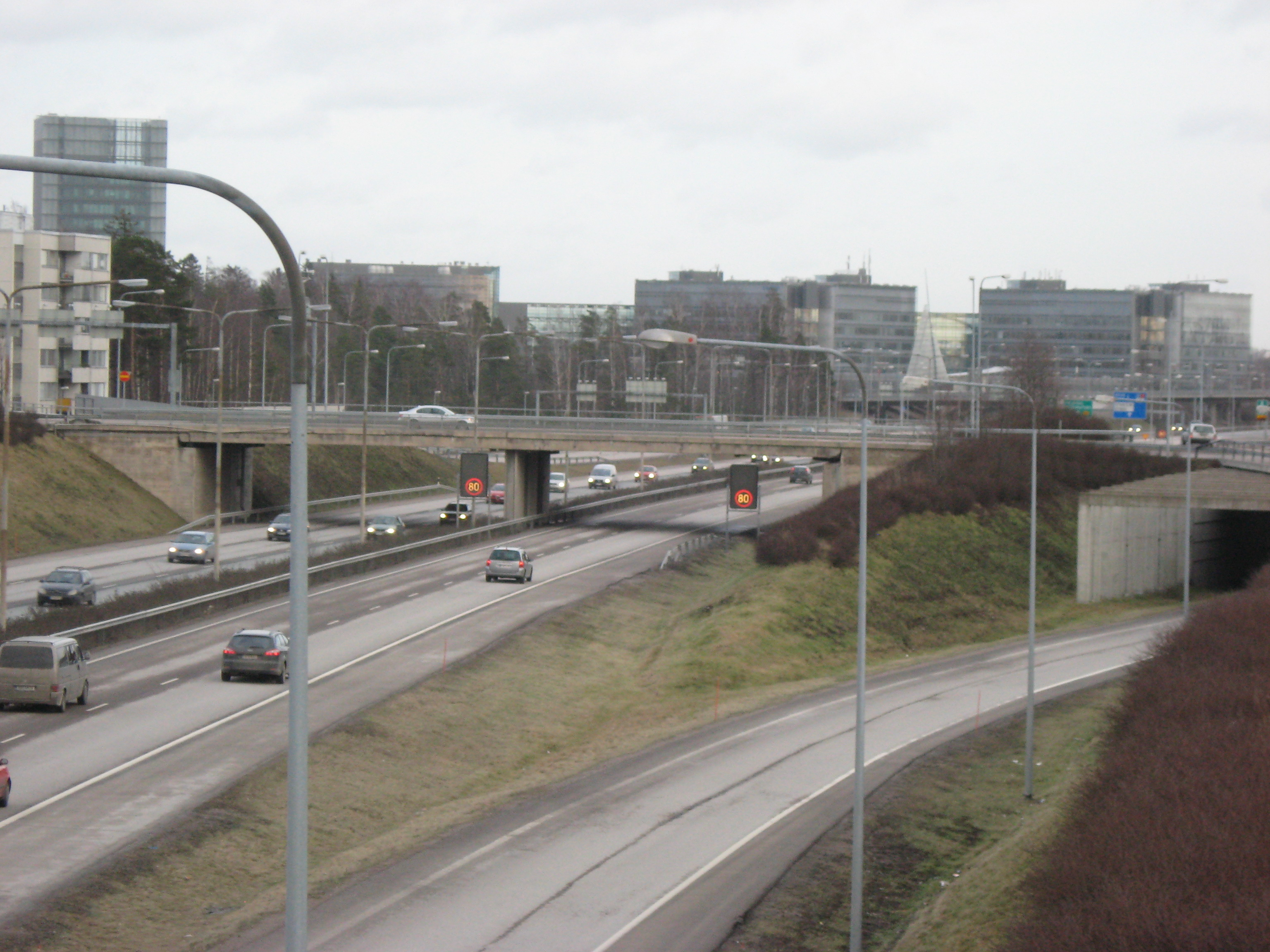
Länsiväylä next to Westend, behind headquarters of Kone and Microsoft

== Other uses ==
Länsiväylä is the name of a Finnish language free newspaper distributed in Espoo, Kauniainen and Kirkkonummi.
