= Ring IV =

Planned road in Uusimaa region, Finland

Kehä IV ("ring four"; Finnish: Kehä IV, Swedish: Ring IV) is a planned transverse road connection for the Helsinki region, which would serve as a continuation of the current regional road 152 (also known as Kulomäentie). The new connection would continue with the same road number and run west from Tuusula Highway to the north of Helsinki-Vantaa Airport, ending at Hämeenlinna Highway (E12), and from there, the road alignment would continue as the Klaukkala's ring road, the regional road 132. Despite its name, the alignment of Ring Road IV would not be circular, but east-west. The estimated construction costs are approximately €160 million.

The new road section would run through the Vantaa and Tuusula areas and would be approximately 13 kilometres (8.1 mi) long. It would have four lanes between Tuusula Highway and Myllykylä, and two lanes from Myllykylä to Hämeenlinna Highway. A pedestrian and cycling route would be implemented along the entire length. The road would include four new interchanges and three at-grade interchanges; in addition, the interchanges on Tuusula Highway and Hämeenlinna Highway would be renovated. Previously, there were also plans to widen the current Kulomäentie to four lanes between Lahti Highway (E75) and Tuusula Highway, but the current plans only concern the completely new road section. The former Road Administration (Tiehallinto) prepared a master plan for Ring Road IV as early as 1996.

The project is particularly important for the municipality of Tuusula because of zoning a business area along the road, which the municipality calls a "focus area". Meanwhile, Vantaa does not see the project as that central from the city’s perspective, but according to the master plan manager, Ring Road IV is of regional importance in terms of logistics. Ring Road IV has aroused considerable opposition among the people of Vantaa due to its potential environmental factors. The expropriations of privately owned land have also caused a lot of uproar.

The preparation of the current road plan began in 2026. Approximately €4 million have been allocated for the planning.

== See also ==
- Kehä I
- Kehä II
- Kehä III
