= Vanha-Espoo =

Vanha-Espoo Gamla Esbo
- District of Espoo
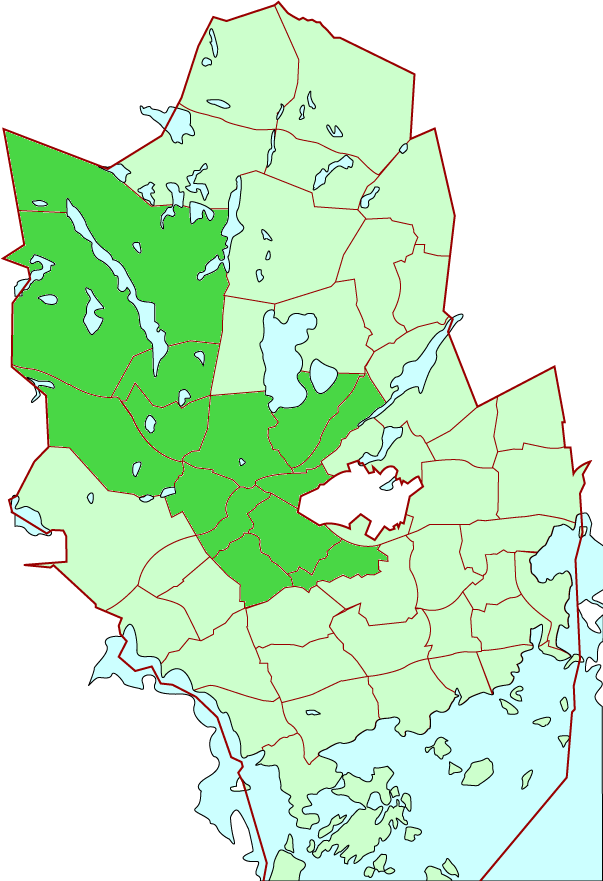
- Location of Vanha-Espoo within Espoo
- Coordinates: 60.25°N 24.60°E
- Country: Finland
- Municipality: Espoo
- Region: Uusimaa
- Sub-region: Greater Helsinki
- Main District: Vanha-Espoo

Population (2019)
  - Total: 41,077

Languages
  - Finnish: 82.4 %
  - Swedish: 8.8 %
  - Oar: 8.8 %

Vanha-Espoo (Finnish) or Gamla Esbo (Swedish), literally "Old Espoo", is the largest metropolitain area of Espoo by area, a city in Finland, and the fifth largest by population. It covers part of the centre and northwest of the city. As of 2019, the population of the area is 41,077.

It contains the districts Espoon keskus, Gumböle, Högnäs, Järvenperä, Karhusuo, Karvasmäki, Kaupunginkallio, Kolmperä, Kunnarla, Kuurinniitty, Muurala, Nupuri, Nuuksio, Siikajärvi and Vanha-Nuuksio.

== See also ==
- Districts of Espoo
