= Suur-Matinkylä =

Suur-Matinkylä Stor-Mattby
- District of Espoo
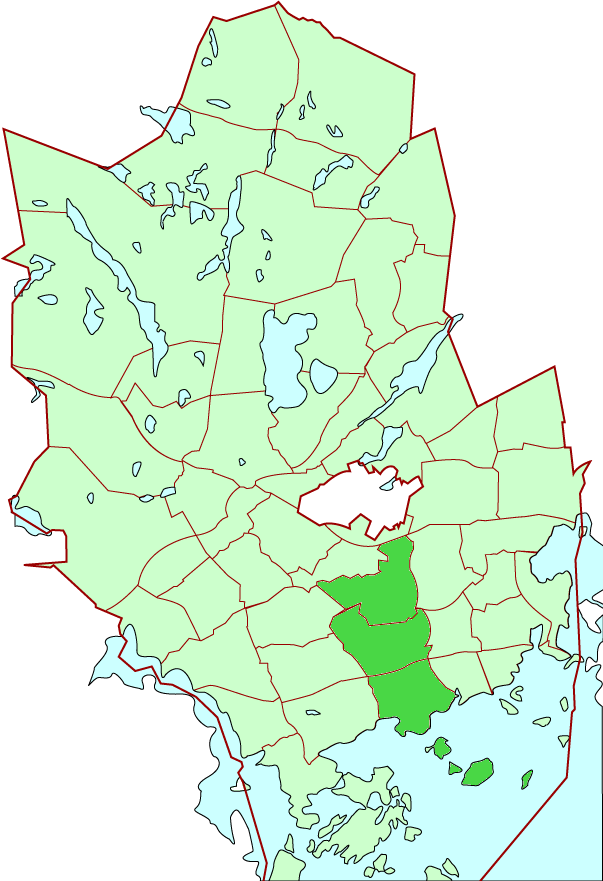
- Location of Suur-Matinkylä within Espoo
- Coordinates: 60.18°N 24.74°E
- Country: Finland
- Municipality: Espoo
- Region: Uusimaa
- Sub-region: Greater Helsinki
- Main District: Suur-Matinkylä

Population (2006)
  - Total: 33,238

Languages
  - Finnish: 83 %
  - Swedish: 10.1 %
  - Other: 6.9 %

Suur-Matinkylä (Finnish) or Stor-Mattby (Swedish) is a southern main district of Espoo, a city in Finland.

It contains the districts Henttaa, Matinkylä and Olari.

== See also ==
- Districts of Espoo
