= Suurpelto =

Area of Espoo, Finland

Coordinates: 60°11′4.99″N 24°44′22.52″E

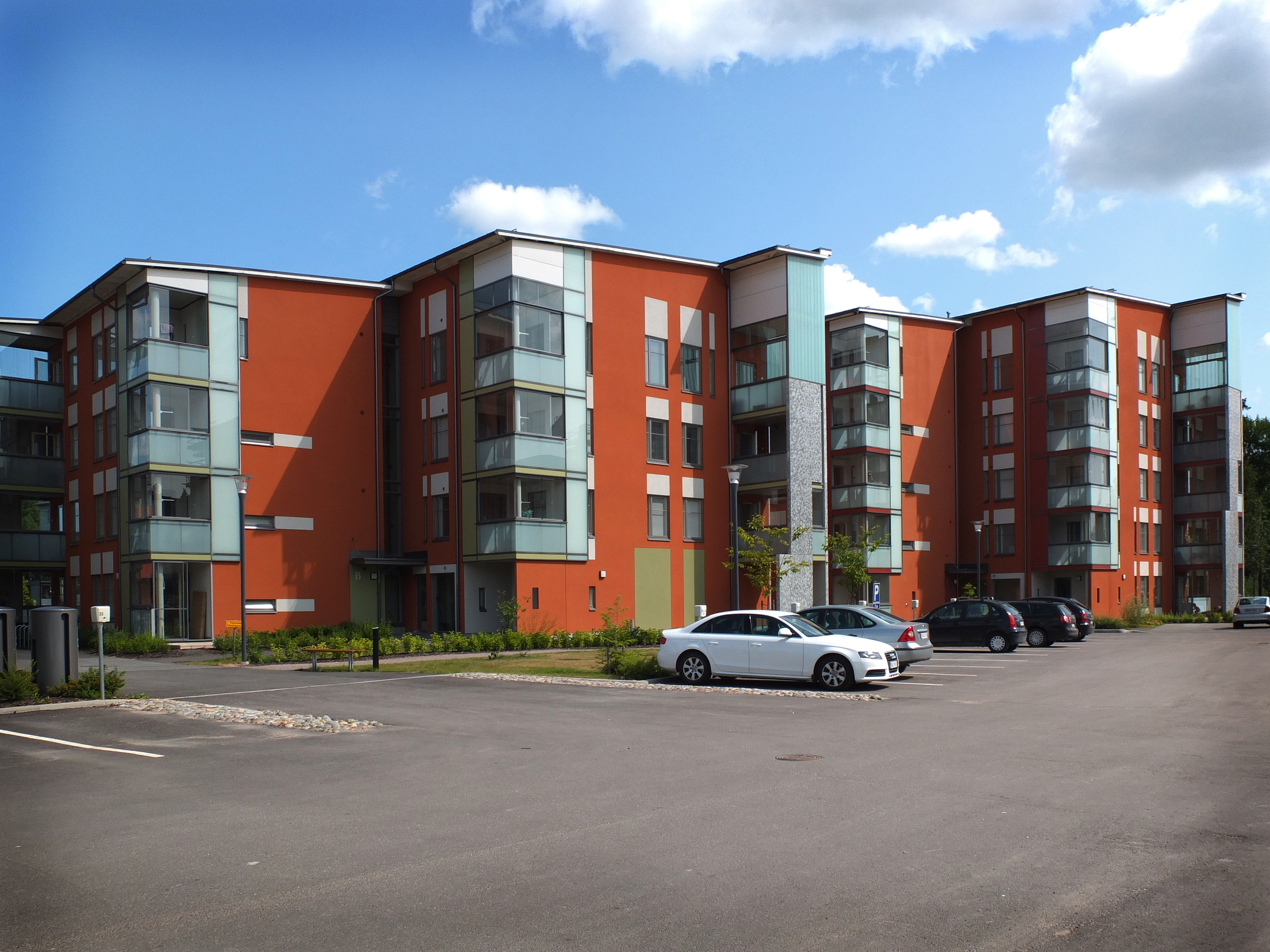
Apartment buildings in Suurpelto.

Suurpelto (Swedish: Storåker) is an area under construction in Espoo, Finland, between the districts of Henttaa, Mankkaa and Olari.

The original plan for the completion of Suurpelto was from 2010 to 2015. There are a total of seven zoning areas, of which some have a confirmed zoning plan. The construction plan includes an overall total of about a million square metres of apartment space. Residential buildings include apartment buildings and one-family houses, the majority being apartment buildings hosting owner-occupied and rented apartments as well as housing cooperatives. The total planned number of residents is between 10 and 15 thousand.

Suurpelto has the second-highest proportion of immigrants in Espoo after Suvela. In 2020 36.4 percent of the inhabitants in Suurpelto spoke a foreign language.

== Location ==
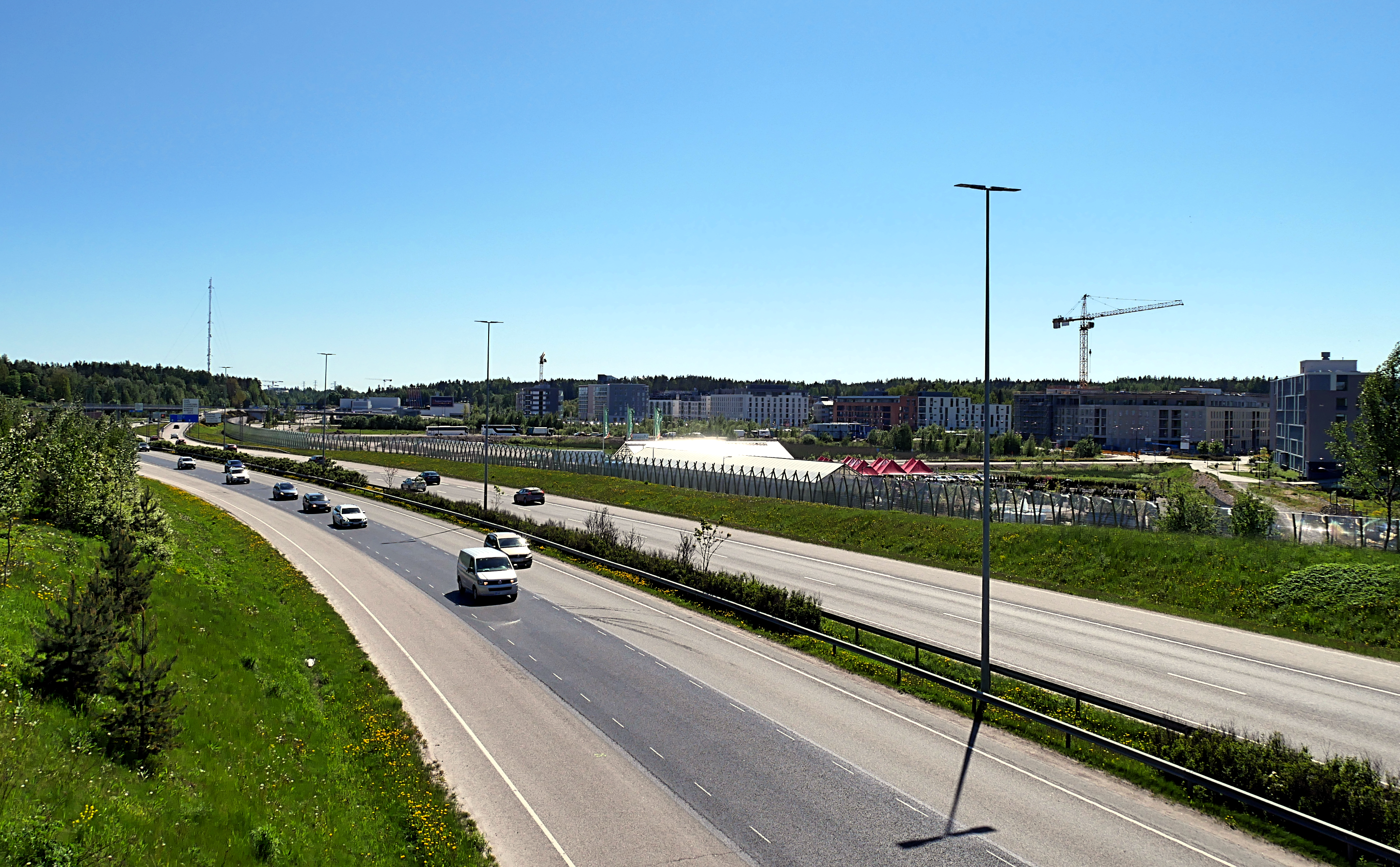
The Ring II beltway runs east of Suurpelto.

In the south, Suurpelto stretches from Olari to the Finnish national road 1 and its eastern part is located east of Ring II, in Mankkaa. In the west it is bordered by the 880-hectare forested Espoo Central Park. The total area of Suurpelto is about 325 hectares, of which 89 hectares are designated for parks.

There is a specific connection from Ring II to Suurpelto.

== Construction ==
Construction of the area started on 18 January 2007 in a unique Espoo way with a seven-shafted shovel. The shovel was originally wielded by chairman of the board Eero Akaan-Penttilä, chairman of the city council Jukka Mäkelä, city director Marketta Kokkonen, technical director Olavi Louko, Asuntosäätiö director Anja Mäkeläinen, Kojamo director Olli Salakka and city engineer Martti Tieaho, later by new chairman of the board Markku Sistonen, deputy chairman of the city council Pekka Vaara, landowner representative Bengt Sohlberg, KPMG representative Lasse Lagus, Fennica representative Pekka Raatikainen and project engineer Satu Lehtonen.

After construction of apartments had started Suurpelto's foundation stone was laid on 20 August 2009 at Klariksentie. A time capsule was made recording a list of people taking part in the foundation laying, issues of the newspapers Helsingin Sanomat, Hufvudstadsbladet and Länsiväylä on the day of the foundation laying, a picture of Suurpelto before construction, a bead necklace made from Suurpelto clay by the children at the Olari kindergarten and a set of coins in use in Finland in 2009. The foundation stone was laid at the end of Klariksentie, on the street where construction of apartments started.

The ground at the area is ancient seabed, which sinks easily. Because of this reason, for example the foundation of Ring II was made by sinking thin piledriver pipes filled with concrete into the ground.

== Greenspaces and parks ==
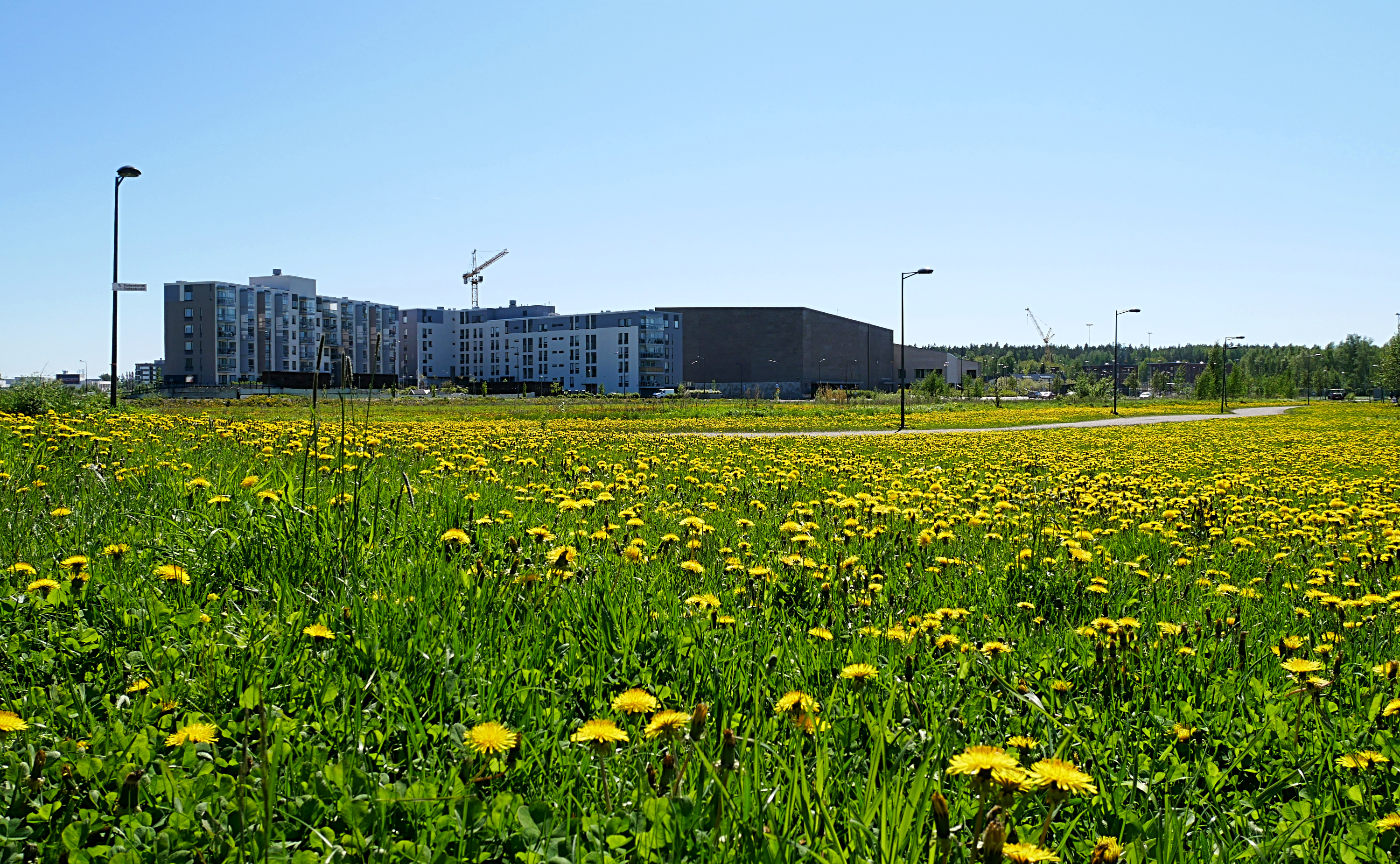
Meadows in Suurpelto.

The largest park in the area is the Espoo Central Park, still in its natural state, located west of Suurpelto.

In June 2017 Finland's first love garden was opened in northern Suurpelto. The garden allows local residents to plant their own fruit trees as symbols of their love. The garden is located at Hentebynkatu 4. The idea of a love garden came in autumn 2016 when 26 members of the Espoo city council made a proposition for founding an ecological love forest.

== Services ==
The Opinmäki campus was inaugurated on 12 August 2015. The school centre hosts premises for an international school, a Finnish-speaking elementary school, early childhood education, a sports hall and space for the Suurpelto library, a workers' institution and youth activity.

The centre of Suurpelto is the Suuris shopping centre along Ring II, including a total planned amount of 16 thousand square metres of business space and 300 parking places. The centre was built by the construction company NCC. The building will be completed in two phases. The first phase was completed and opened to the public on 16 November 2017 and hosts about 4500 square metres of business space in two floors. The largest tenant is K-Supermarket.

== Public transport ==
The following Helsinki Regional Transport Authority bus lines travel to Suurpelto:

- 118 Tapiola - Urheilupuisto - Suurpelto - Espoon keskus
- 520: Matinkylä - Nuottaniemi - Matinkylä - Suurpelto - Leppävaara
- 533: Hyljelahti - Matinkylä - Suurpelto - Kauniainen - Järvenperä
- 133: Friisilä - Matinkylä - Suurpelto - Henttaa
- 118N Kamppi - Tapiola - Olari - Suurpelto - Espoon keskus - Jorvi

The following lines travel nearby:

- 544: Leppävaara - Nihtisilta - Soukka - Kivenlahti (stops on Ring II near Lukusilta)

The bus lines travel along Henttaan puistokatu through the area. Feeder traffic to Länsimetro goes to Matinkylä on lines 520 and 533, as well as to Tapiola via Urheilupuisto on line 118.

== Nature ==
The nature in Suurpelto is typical rural nature. The field meadows are surrounded by forests and residential buildings. The forests are mostly pine barrens acquired by the city of Espoo for outdoor hiking use, but there are also small batches of old-growth forest and grove forest. There is a protected nut grove to the east of the fields. Inhabitants of nearby areas also use the Suurpelto area and the Espoo Central Park as an outdoor refreshment area.
