= Koivusaari =

Island in Helsinki, Finland

Coordinates: 60°09′47″N 24°50′59″E

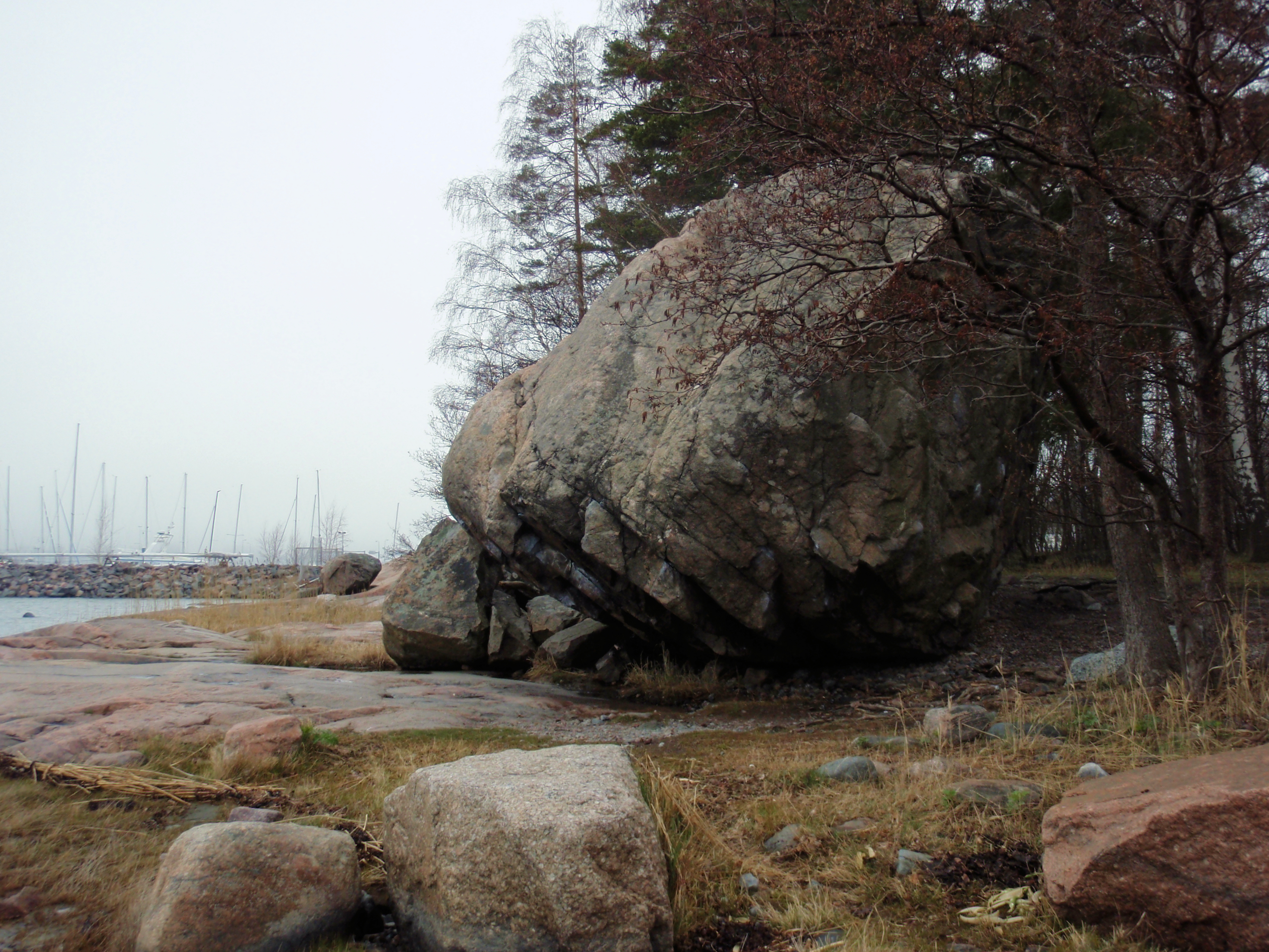
Koivusaari island

A map of the city of Helsinki with Koivusaari highlighted in red and circled, rest of the Lauttasaari district in light red.

Koivusaari (Finnish: [ˈkoi̯ʋuˌsɑːri]; Swedish: Björkholmen; literally the "Birch Island") is an island and a part of the district of Lauttasaari in Helsinki, Finland. The island hosts two yacht clubs and a former Nokia training centre. The current island of Koivusaari has been formed by combining the island of Koivusaari proper with the island of Leppäsaari to the south of it and expanding it. Since the late 1990s and early 2000s there have been plans to construct a new residential area on reclaimed land in Koivusaari, served by the Koivusaari metro station.

Koivusaari is the westernmost district of the entire southern part of Helsinki. Directly west from it is a bridge across the Keilalahti bay, crossing the municipality border to Espoo, after which comes Keilaniemi, the easternmost district of southern Espoo.

Koivusaari metro station is a Helsinki Metro station since the Länsimetro extension 2017. It is Helsinki's westernmost metro station.

== Geography, nature and geology ==
The surface area of Koivusaari is about 13 hectares and it has a coastline of 1.7 kilometres. Mainly consisting of reclaimed land, the island is fairly low, and its highest points only rise about seven metres above sea level. There originally were two islands at the site of the current island of Koivusaari: the northern island of Koivusaari and the island of Leppäsaari (Swedish: Alholmen) to the south of it. The soil in the islands mainly consists of till, and they have been joined with reclaimed land, with a thickness of 1 to 3 metres between the islands. There are some small smooth cliff areas on the western part of Koivusaari. The islands of Koivusaari and Lauttasaari are located in an area of acidic minerals, and the cliffs in Koivusaari mainly consist of granite.

The natural flora in Koivusaari are of the fresh soil blueberry type. The trees on the island consist of species in a mixed forest; mainly birch and pine. There are reeds on the northeastern and northwestern parts of the islands, and there are small lawn and bush areas on the built parts of the area. There is a small natural outcrop and meadow beach on the southern tip of the island with a diverse selection of coastal flora. The natural value of the area was already noticed in a 1991 study. The coastal meadow with a size of 0.1 hectares on the southern tip of the island was protected under the 2001 nature protection law. The flora in the southern tip includes grassleaf orache, Atriplex longipes, tall fescue, bearded couch, sand ryegrass, sea milkwort, silverweed, Silene vulgaris, bird's-foot trefoil, purple moor-grass, Odontites litoralis as well as lesser and greater centaury.

The vertical granite boulder at the southern tip of the island is one of the largest boulders in Helsinki. The boulder is 5 metres tall and has an area of 8.5 × 4.5 metres (previously 6 metres, parts of the boulder have fallen off). It has been classified as a prominent landscape element with nature protection value.

== History ==
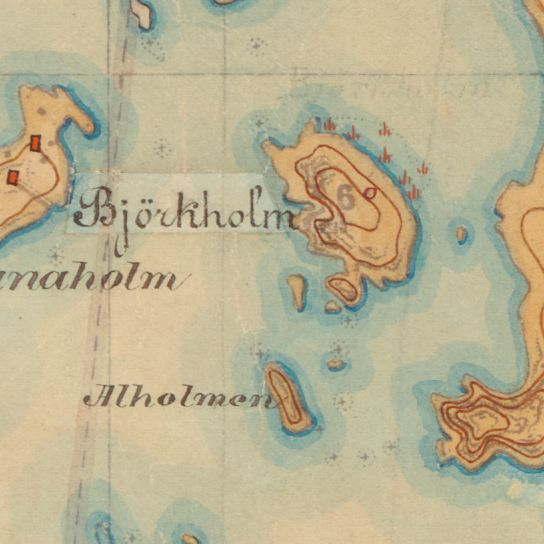
The islands of Koivusaari (Björkholm) and Leppäsaari (Alholmen) at the Senate Atlas of Finland.

There used to be two islands at the site of the current island of Koivusaari: the northern island of Koivusaari and the southern island of Leppäsaari. On a Russian topographical map made from 1902 to 1911 there were fisher settlements on Koivusaari. The islands of Koivusaari and Lauttasaari belonged to the municipality of Huopalahti, which was annexed to the city of Helsinki in early 1946. The eastern part of Koivusaari had already been filled with reclaimed land at the time, and it had been connected to Leppäsaari with a causeway. The street Jorvaksentie, opened for traffic in 1935 was built to pass through Koivusaari. This traffic connection led to the area being used as a landfill until the 1952 Summer Olympics, when the landfill was covered with soil. The landfill was located to the south of the highway. The area was used as landfill both by companies and by the Finnish Defence Forces, whose army boots and ammunition were found in the area during construction of electrical wire support beams.

Until the widening of Länsiväylä in the 1960s, the southern part of Koivusaari was owned by the plumbing company Radiator, which had a workshop and a storeroom on the island. During the time of the company, toxic waste was dumped on the coast near the pier of the Finnish Sauna Society and pitch barrels were dumped on the middle part of the island. The city of Helsinki filled the island area with clay sludge and with reclaimed land made from the remains of buildings destroyed in the war. The island hosted a paint storehouse of the Nikator construction company, a junkyard with its storeroom and the companies Huber Oy and Transporter Oy. A-Elementti Oy had a temporary showroom in the area.

In 2003, the island hosted the boating companies Selboat Oy and Flipper Market, the maritime branch of the exercise department of the city of Helsinki and the yacht clubs Nyländska Jaktklubben and Koivusaaren Pursiseura.

== Zoning ==
=== The metro and the general zoning plan open planning of the residential area ===
In the turn of the 1990s and 2000s Koivusaari was mainly in use of three yacht clubs. At the turn of the decade there were plans to build a new district in the area as part of the 2002 functional zoning plan of Helsinki, in addition to which the investigation was partly caused by the Länsimetro line in planning stage at the time, with one station being planned near the new residential area on the island. The first sketches of the area show the island as expanded fivefold in area, which would have made it a 50-hectare area the size of Katajanokka. The area was planned to be constructed with reclaimed land as tightly as the nearby district of Ruoholahti, which would have brought new apartment buildings and terraced houses for about four to six thousand people.

The area was seen to fit well in with reclaimed land, as the sea in the area is shallow and the seabed is fairly hard. Through various building projects, Helsinki had acquired large amounts of loose soil, which could be put into use as reclaimed land. Sale of coastal lots in the area was thought to bring income to the city, which could be used to cover the cost of constructing the Länsimetro line.

Functional zoning plans of Koivusaari were presented to citizens of Helsinki during preparation of the plan. Coastal construction and the use of reclaimed land were met with intense criticism during hearing of the zoning plan. Already during the preparation of the plan Koivusaari became one of the main controversial points of the new functional zoning plan. Construction plans took a step backward in autumn 2000 and early 2001, as they failed to receive enough political support from the Helsinki city council. The issue was postponed to the functional zoning discussions in spring 2001, and a new investigation was made for the construction of the area, which would preserve the protected coastal meadow in the southern part of the island. The disputed area remained in the December 2001 sketch of the functional zoning plan, where areas set for residential construction had been contracted.

In the end, construction of the area became one of the most controversial points of the new functional zoning plan. Construction plans were swept under the rug in February 2003 when political groups in the city council left Koivusaari as an investigation area in the new functional zoning plan along with Vartiosaari and Kivinokka. The 2002 functional zoning plan was confirmed in October 2002.

=== The new rise of the construction plans ===
The construction plans of Koivusaari were taken back into the open in spring 2005 when a new functional zoning plan for the area was being prepared. The planning took a step ahead in autumn 2006 when the city of Espoo made a decision about constructing the Länsimetro line. The city of Helsinki set a target to finish the sketches of the new functional zoning plan by 2008, and starting points for the plan included the new metro station to be built in the area and reclaimed land in the southern and northern parts of the island.

The new plans started forming in spring 2007, when a residential area for 2800 to 3800 people was being planned in the area. Construction of new apartments was planned to mostly take place to the south of the Länsiväylä highway, unlike the earlier plans. The Vaskilahti boat harbour would be preserved, but the Nylands Jaktklubben boat harbour on the western part of the island would be moved to the tip of the island because of reclaimed land. Particularly the Lauttasaari Society opposed renewing the construction plans. An international idea contest about the planning of the area was held in 2009, which resulted in the city receiving 101 different proposals about construction on the island.

The preliminary plan for the Koivusaari residential area was completed in April 2011, and it mostly followed the winning proposal of the idea contest, although the harbour areas had been slightly expanded. The surface area of the island was planned to be increased twofold through reclaimed land. The new plan included apartments for 4000 people and 1500 jobs.

=== Saving in the zoning plans ===
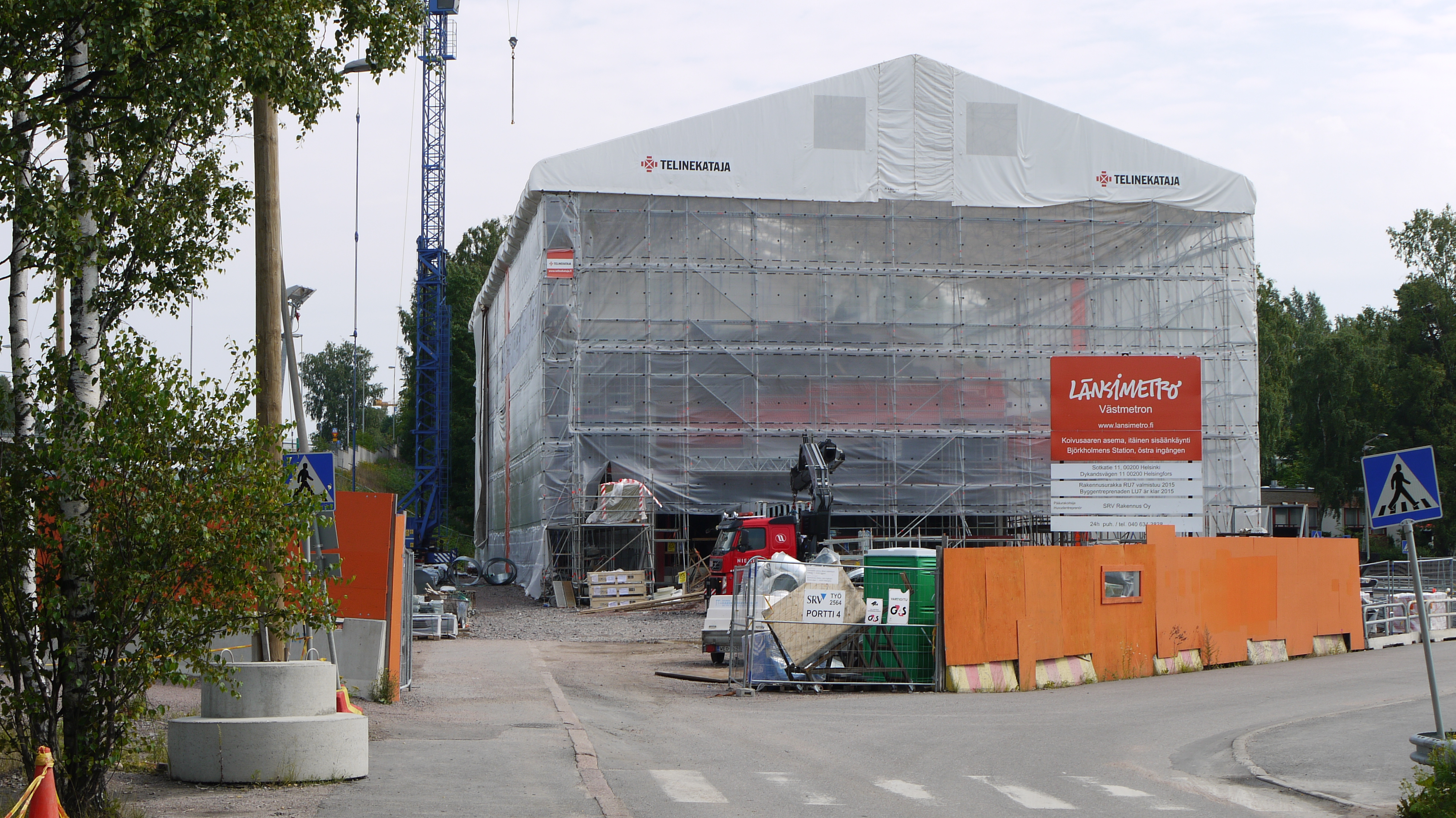
The eastern entrance of the Koivusaari metro station under construction in August 2015.

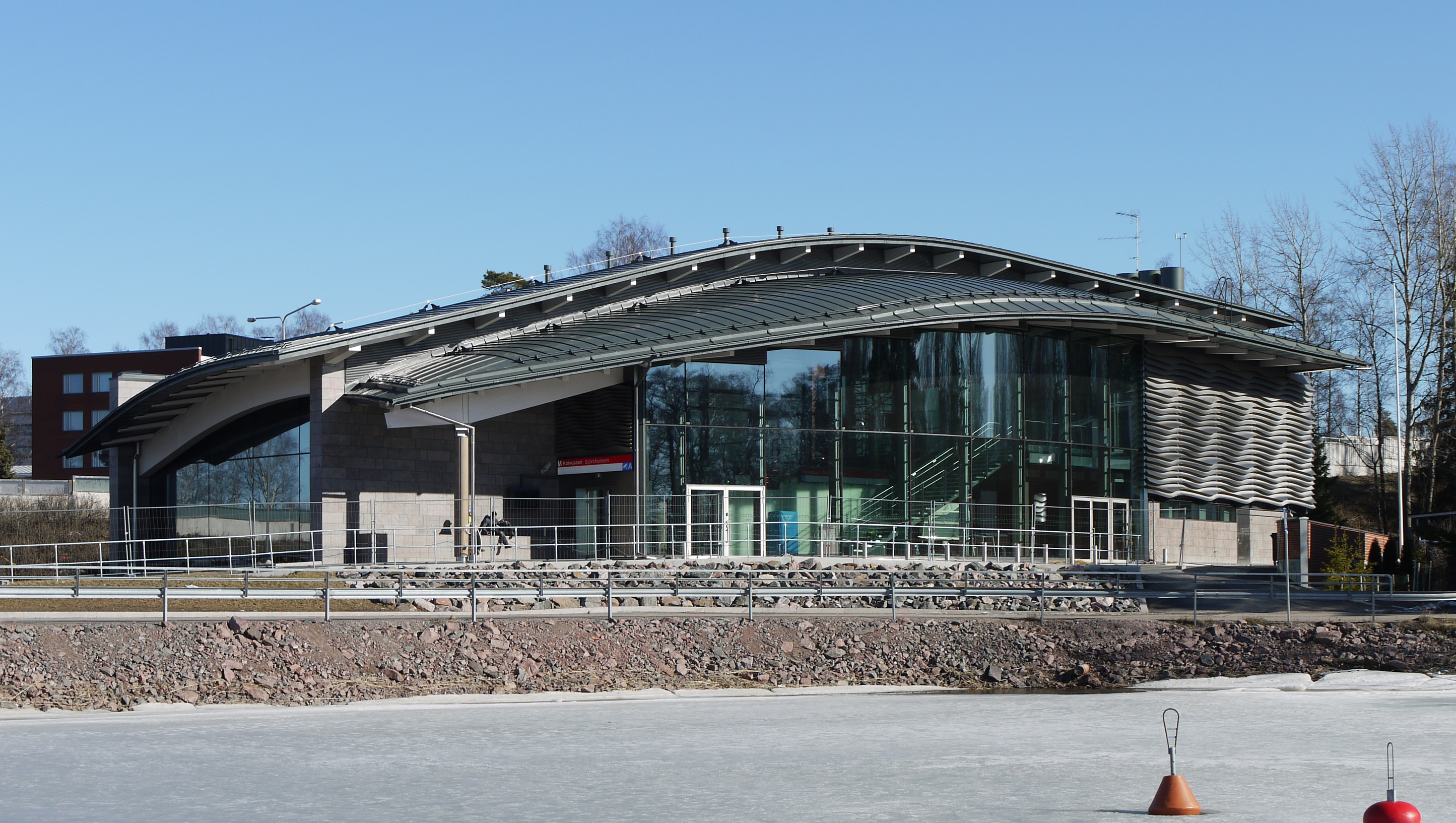
The entrance to the metro station in March 2017.

The decision about the matter was again postponed by several years, and in 2013 it was estimated that construction could begin in 2016 or 2017 at the earliest, but most probably only in the 2020s. The money situation of the city had become a problem as getting a residential area on reclaimed land ready for construction would cost about 200 million euro, including the costs for a new interchange on the Länsiväylä highway and new concrete structures to pass over the highway. These structures were pruned, as in the original plan they would have cost 140 million euro, over half of the total cost of the plan.

Another new functional zoning proposal for the area was completed in March 2014, including contracting the concrete cover on the Länsiväylä highway, making the tunnel into a lighter wide bridge because of security considerations. The most significant difference to the original proposal was that the surface area of the island was now bigger by a third. The channel planned to the southern part of the island was shortened and costs for other coastal construction were cut. The new plan returned to the figure of 5000 inhabitants in the area in the original plans, as well as 4000 jobs planned on the island. This expansion could be achieved by increasing the height of the buildings and the building density. With the new functional zoning proposal construction of the area became again feasible for the city, although the largest part would be constructed on reclaimed land. Regardless of the delays in construction, it was decided in 2014 to open the new metro station in the area together with the rest of the metro line, even though it was only projected to have 8000 visitors per day.

In March 2014 the city of Helsinki bought the Nokia executive villa in the north of the island for 2.75 million euro. There were plans to dismantle the building if that would help to make a working zoning plan.

The City Council of Helsinki approved the functional zoning plan in January 2015 with votes 76 to 5. The plan only went to force in March 2017 when the Supreme Administrative Court of Finland rejected a complaint made against it.

An illustrative drawing of the zoning plan of the area was published in March 2016 and the actual zoning plan was completed in January 2017.
