= Suur-Kauklahti =

Suur-Kauklahti Stor-Köklax
- District of Espoo
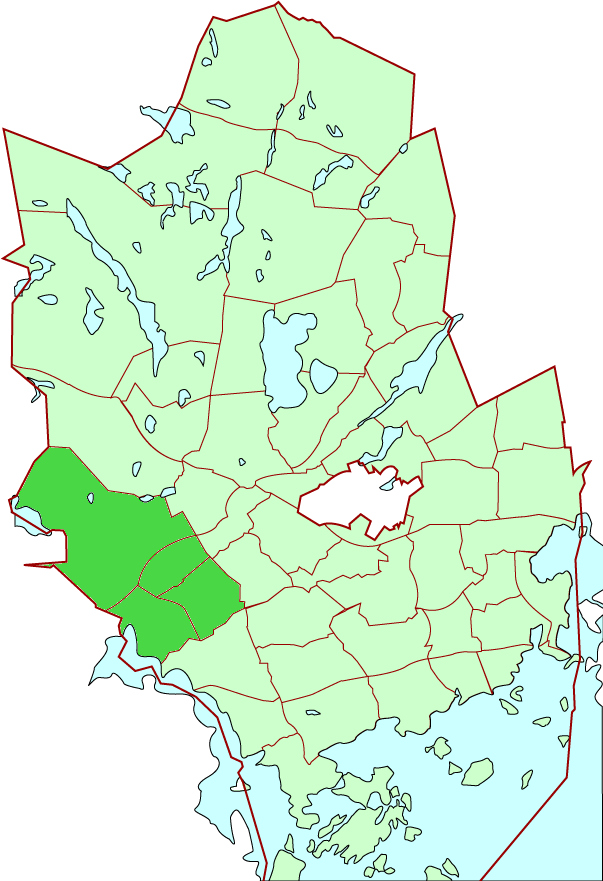
- Location of Suur-Kauklahti within Espoo
- Coordinates: 60.20°N 24.59°E
- Country: Finland
- Municipality: Espoo
- Region: Uusimaa
- Sub-region: Greater Helsinki
- Main District: Suur-Kauklahti

Population (2006)
  - Total: 5,681

Languages
  - Finnish: 80.5 %
  - Swedish: 14.5 %
  - Other: 5.0 %

Suur-Kauklahti (Finnish) or Stor-Köklax (Swedish) is a western main district of Espoo, a city in Finland.

It contains the districts Espoonkartano, Kauklahti, Kurttila, Vanttila.

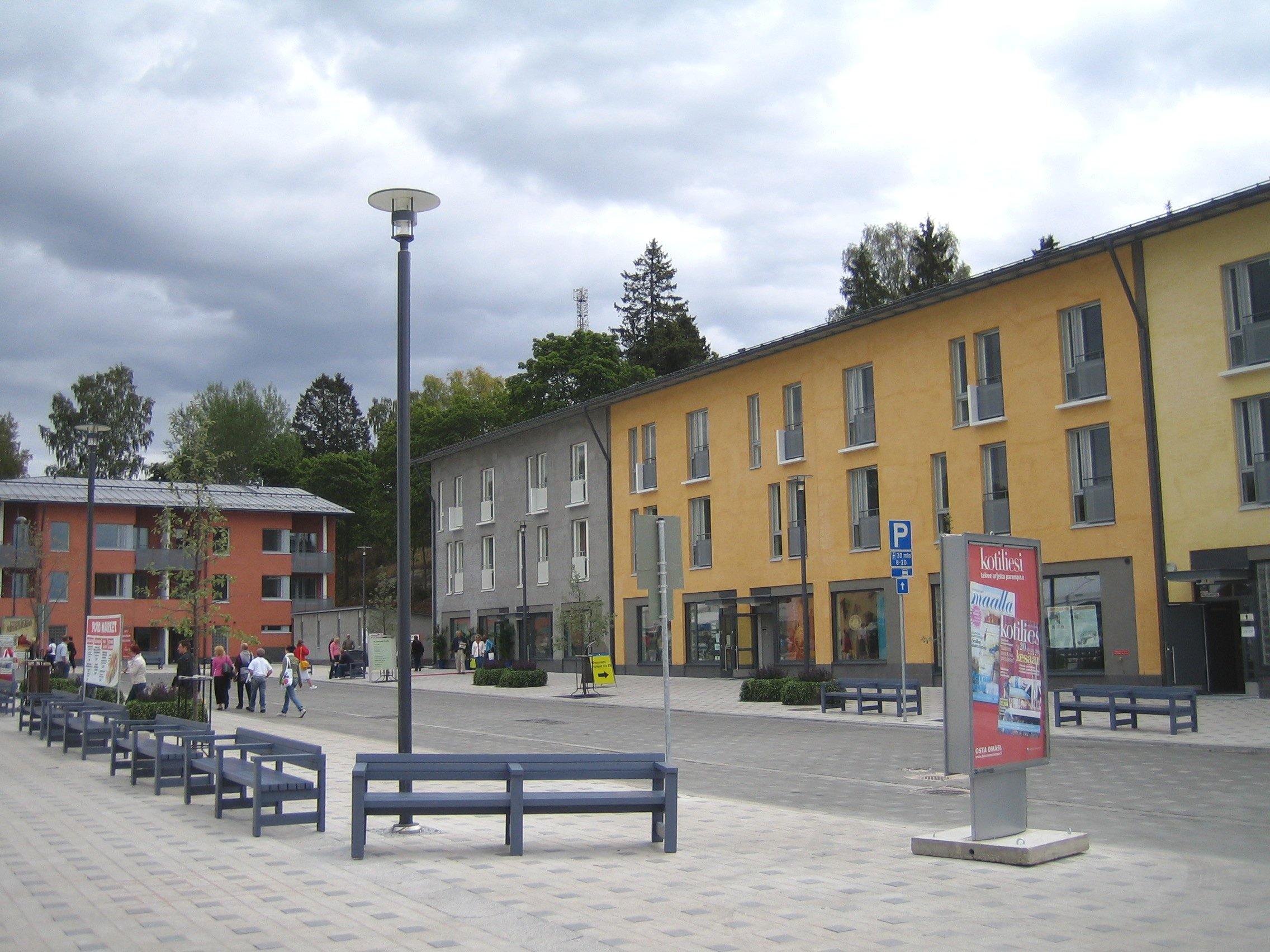
Kauklahti during the 2006 Finnish Housing Fair

== See also ==
- Districts of Espoo
