= Blominmäki sewage treatment plant =

Finnish wastewater treatment facility

Coordinates: 60°12′26″N 024°36′51″E

The Blominmäki sewage treatment plant is a major waste water treatment facility in Espoo, Finland, which was brought into service in August 2023.

== Funding ==
It represents the most expensive investment of the Helsinki Region Environmental Services Authority to date, with a total cost of approximately 400 million Euros, partly financed by a loan from the European Investment Bank. It is the second most expensive infrastructure project in the Helsinki Metropolitan Area, behind the coming extension of the Western Metro.

The plant was first proposed in 2005, and construction began in 2014. It cleans sewage from some 400,000 local residents from Espoo, Kauniainen, Vihti, Siuntio and western Vantaa. In the future, its operations could be enlarged, so that it could process the sewage of a million residents.

== Operations ==
The sewage to be cleaned first flows to the Suomenoja sewage treatment plant, and from there it is pumped through pipelines for 8 kilometres (5.0 mi) to the northwest of the Ring III highway, to Blominmäki, for the cleaning process. After the sewage is cleaned, it flows by gravity back to Suomenoja, and from there it is pumped to the Gulf of Finland where it flows into the sea at 15 kilometres (9.3 mi) offshore. The sewage thus moves back and forth in Espoo, and the reason for this is that it would be too expensive to rebuild all the pipeline systems in Espoo. It was not possible to plan the plant closer to Suomenoja due to a great resistance of local residents in the area.

The technology used in the plant is much the same as in other such plants in Finland, and the performance of this technology is well known. Some new technology is be used at the end of the process, and this includes the filtering of phosphorus with special discs. It is claimed that 96% of the phosphorus can be cleaned this way, and that 90% of the nitrogen can be cleaned by the plant. The plant also produces sludge and biogas, and the plant will be heated with the help of the latter. It is also possible that the plant will be self-sufficient with regard to electricity.

The sludge decomposes at 35°C. There are four tubs for the anaerobic digestion process, and they have been mined into the bedrock. The tubs are 25 metres (82 ft) deep and their volume is 6,000 cubic metres (210,000 ft^{3}). A propeller stirs the sludge to enable a smooth process. The sludge is ready in 3–4 weeks, after which it is transported to the Ämmässuo Waste Treatment Plant, where it is allowed to compost. The output was expected to be 250,000 tons of dried sludge per year. The liquids from the sludge are processed in Blominmäki. In order to minimize the smell nuisance, the pipe of the plant will be 100 metres tall.

== A tunnel from Helsinki to Blominmäki ==
In 2025 it was reported that HSY is going to build a sewage water tunnel from Helsinki to Blominmäki. The tunnel will be 12 kilometres long, and it will extend from Lassila, Helsinki, to Blominmäki, taking there the sewage waters of 100 000 Helsinki residents. A separate branch will join this tunnel from Kauniainen. The quarrying will commence in 2028, and the tunnel should be completed in 2031. It will cost 80 million Euros. And extension to the plant in Blominmäki will cost another 100 million Euros.
