= Gumböle =

Gumböle Kumpyöli
- District of Espoo
- Interactive map of Gumböle
- Coordinates: 60.2193°N 24.6171°E
- Country: Finland
- Municipality: Espoo
- Region: Uusimaa
- Sub-region: Greater Helsinki
- Postal district: 02810

Gumböle is a district of Espoo, a city in Finland. It contains the city's golf course and an underground sewage treatment works opened in 2023, Blominmäki.

== See also ==
- Blominmäki sewage treatment plant
- Districts of Espoo
- Ring III
