= Henttaa =

Henttaa Hemtans
- District of Espoo
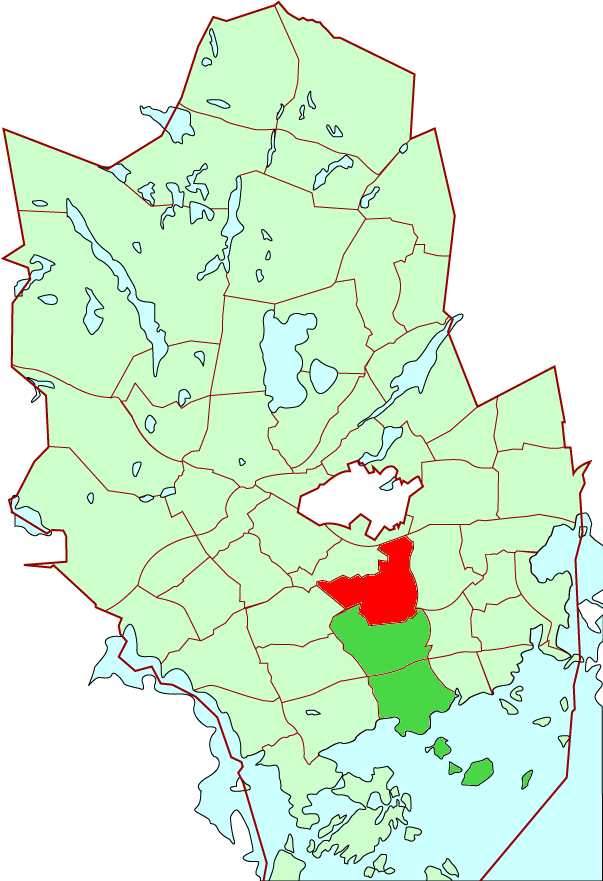
- Location of Henttaa within Espoo
- Coordinates: 60°12′N 24°44′E
- Country: Finland
- Municipality: Espoo
- Region: Uusimaa
- Sub-region: Greater Helsinki
- Main District: Suur-Matinkylä
- Inner District(s): Henttaa, Suurpelto

Population (2006)
  - Total: 544

Languages
  - Finnish: 83.1 %
  - Swedish: 13.2 %
  - Other: 3.7 %
- Jobs: 52

Henttaa (Swedish: Hemtans) is a district of Espoo, a city in Finland.

== See also ==
- Districts of Espoo
