= Ring I =

Road in Uusimaa region, Finland

Regional Road 101
- Yhdystie 101 (Finnish); Förbindelseväg 101 (Swedish)
- Ring I: Kehä I; Ring I
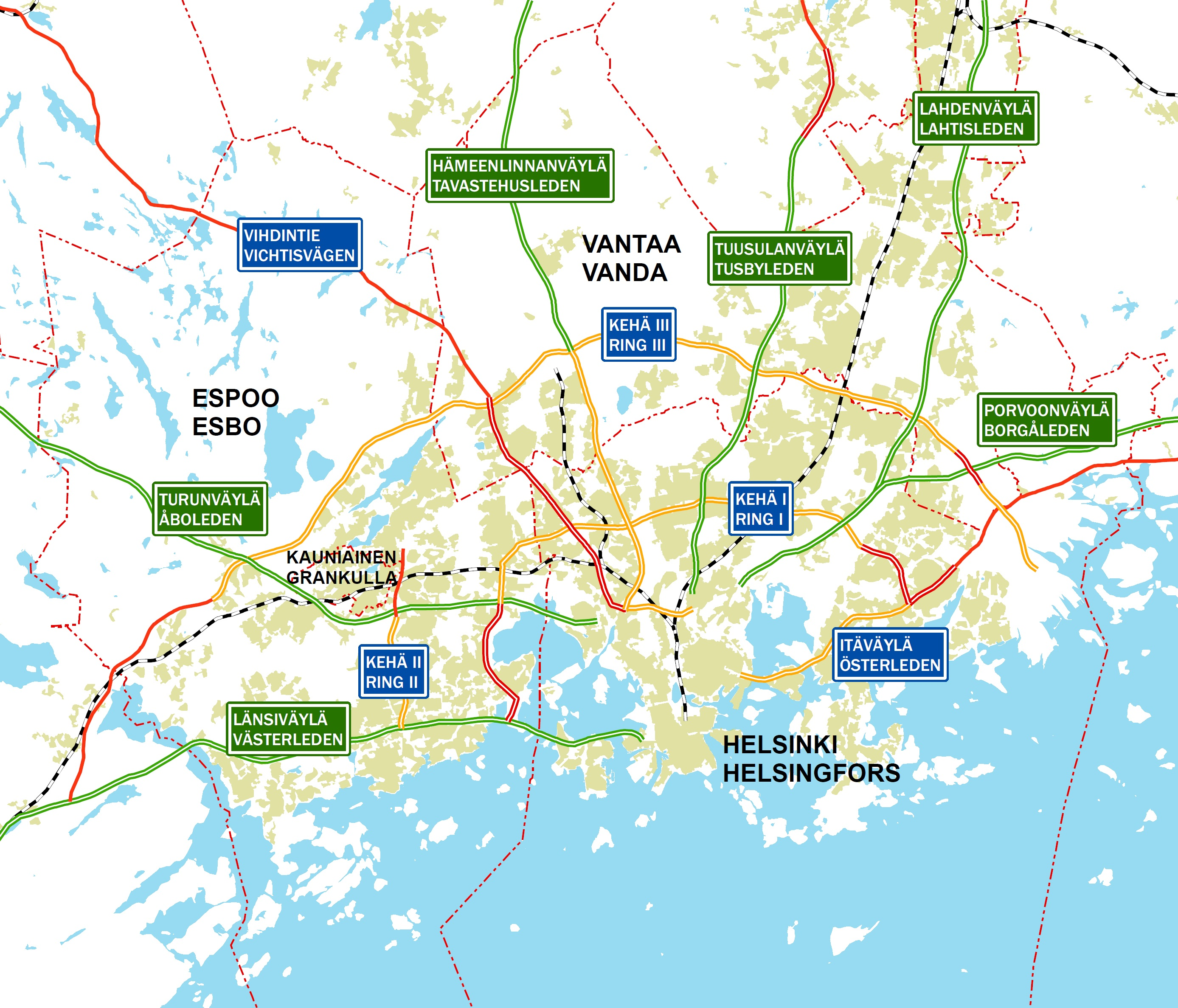

Route information
- Length: 24.2 km (15.0 mi)
- Existed: 1980–present

Major junctions
- From: Itäväylä
- To: Länsiväylä

Location
- Country: Finland
- Major cities: Helsinki

Highway system
- Highways in Finland

Ring I (pronounced "ring one", Finnish: Kehä I, Swedish: Ring I) is the busiest road in Finland, carrying up to 113,000 vehicles per day. It is the innermost of the three beltways in the Helsinki capital region, numbered as regional route 101 and runs from the easternmost part of Espoo to Itäkeskus in eastern Helsinki. The total length is 24.2 kilometres (15.0 mi), of which 16 km (9.9 mi) are in Helsinki. It is primarily intended for local traffic—before the large road numbering change in the 1990s and the reconstruction of Ring III, Ring I was also designated as a bypass for avoiding Helsinki centre.

== Overview ==
Ring I has at least two lanes per direction for its entire length but a speed limit that never exceeds 80 kilometres per hour (50 mph) owing to heavy traffic. With the introduction of new grade-separated interchanges, provisions have been made to increase the speed limits to 70–80 km/h. Eventually, all of the junctions on Ring I will be upgraded to grade-separated interchanges. However, the road was not originally constructed as a motorway, which limits its capacity..

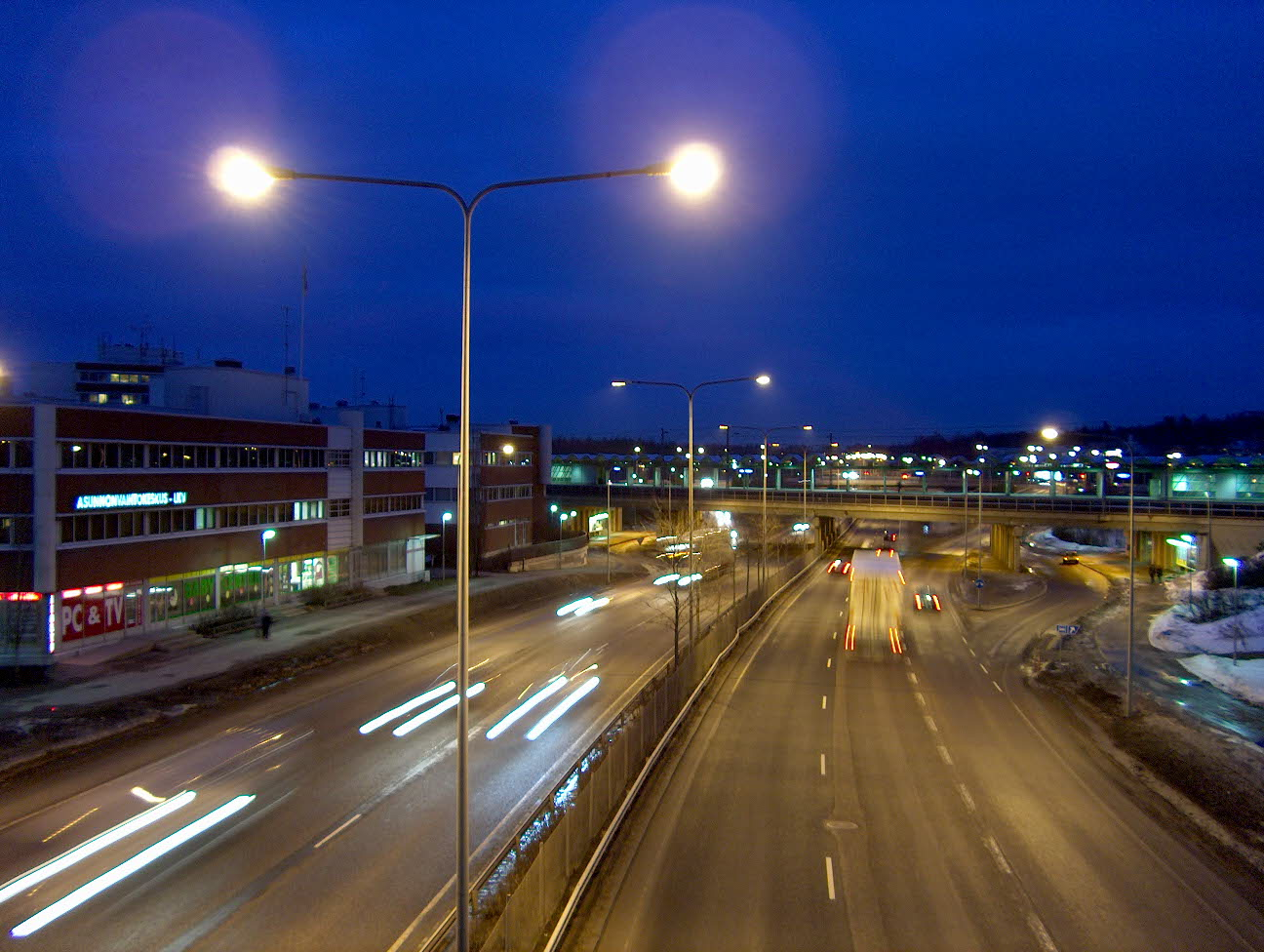
Ring I in the evening. Photo taken near Pukinmäki, in the northernmost tip of the road.

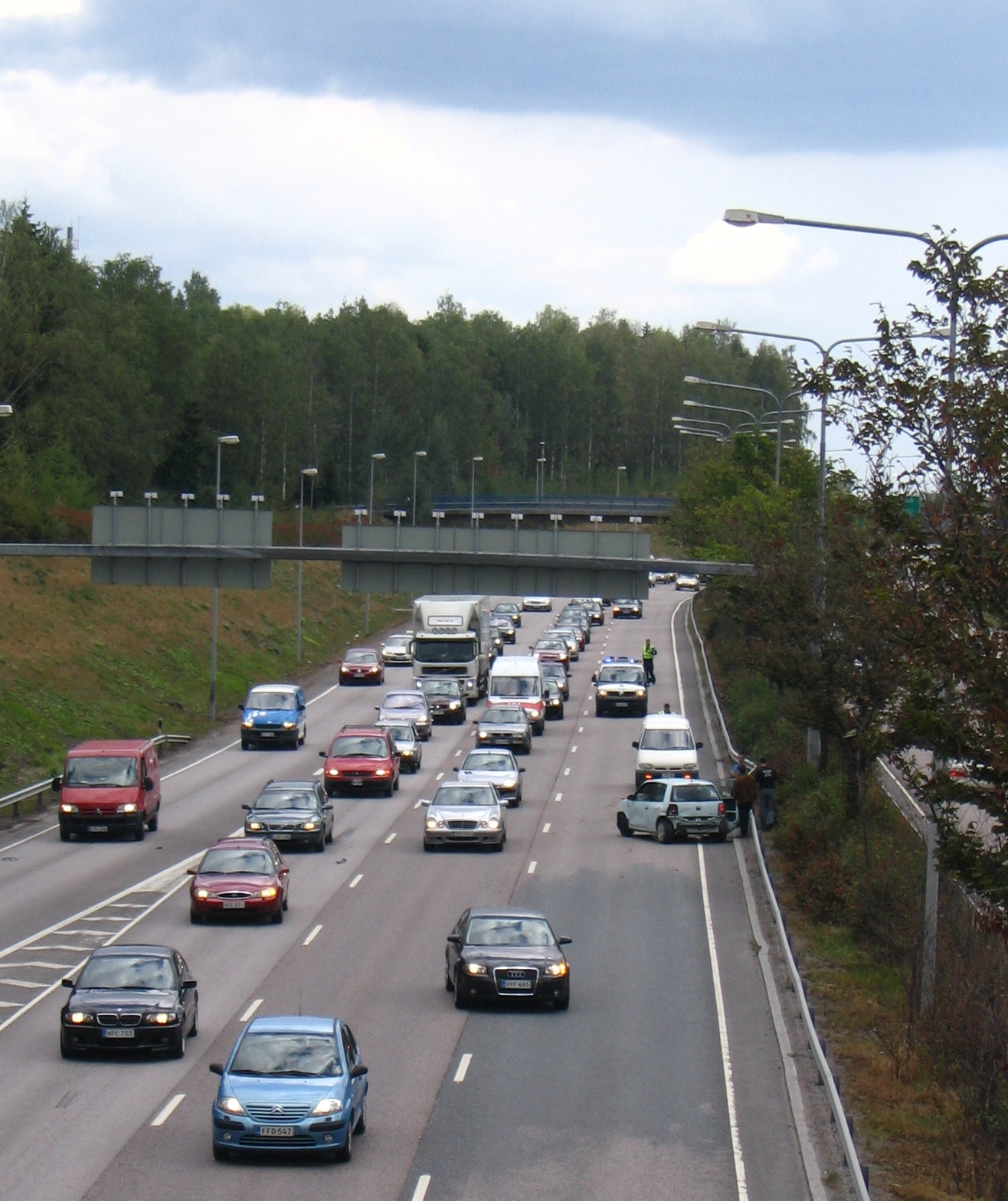
Rush hour comes early, as an accident forces westbound traffic to two lanes. Photo taken from a bridge in Pakila.

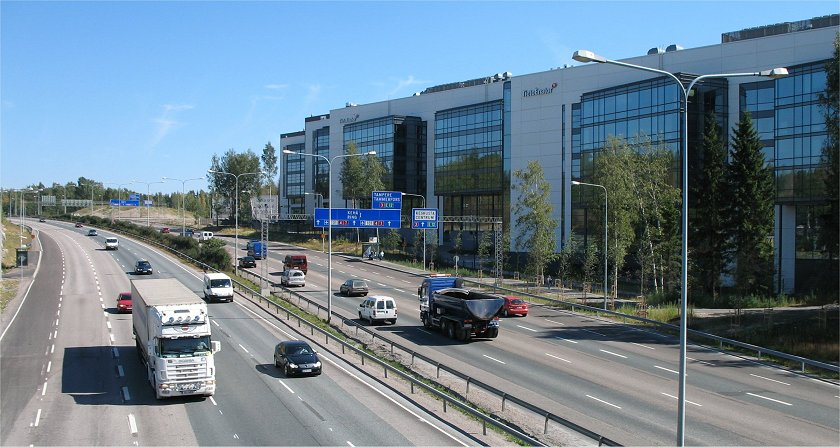
Tieto buildings line Ring I in Pohjois-Haaga, Helsinki.

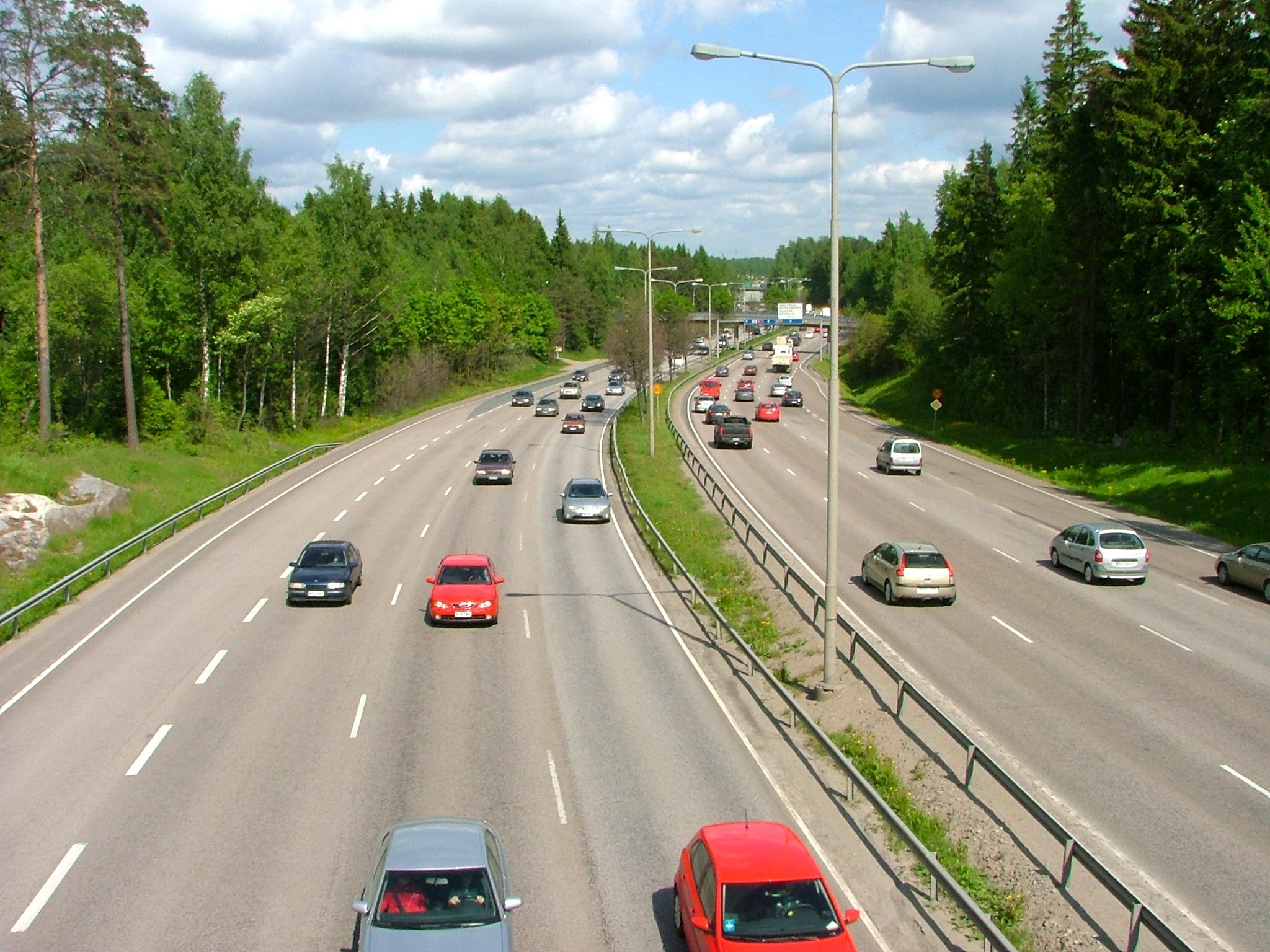
Ring I at Pirkkola, Helsinki where it crosses the Central Park.

== See also ==
- Ring II
- Ring III
- Itäväylä
- Länsiväylä
- Tuusulanväylä
- Vihdintie
