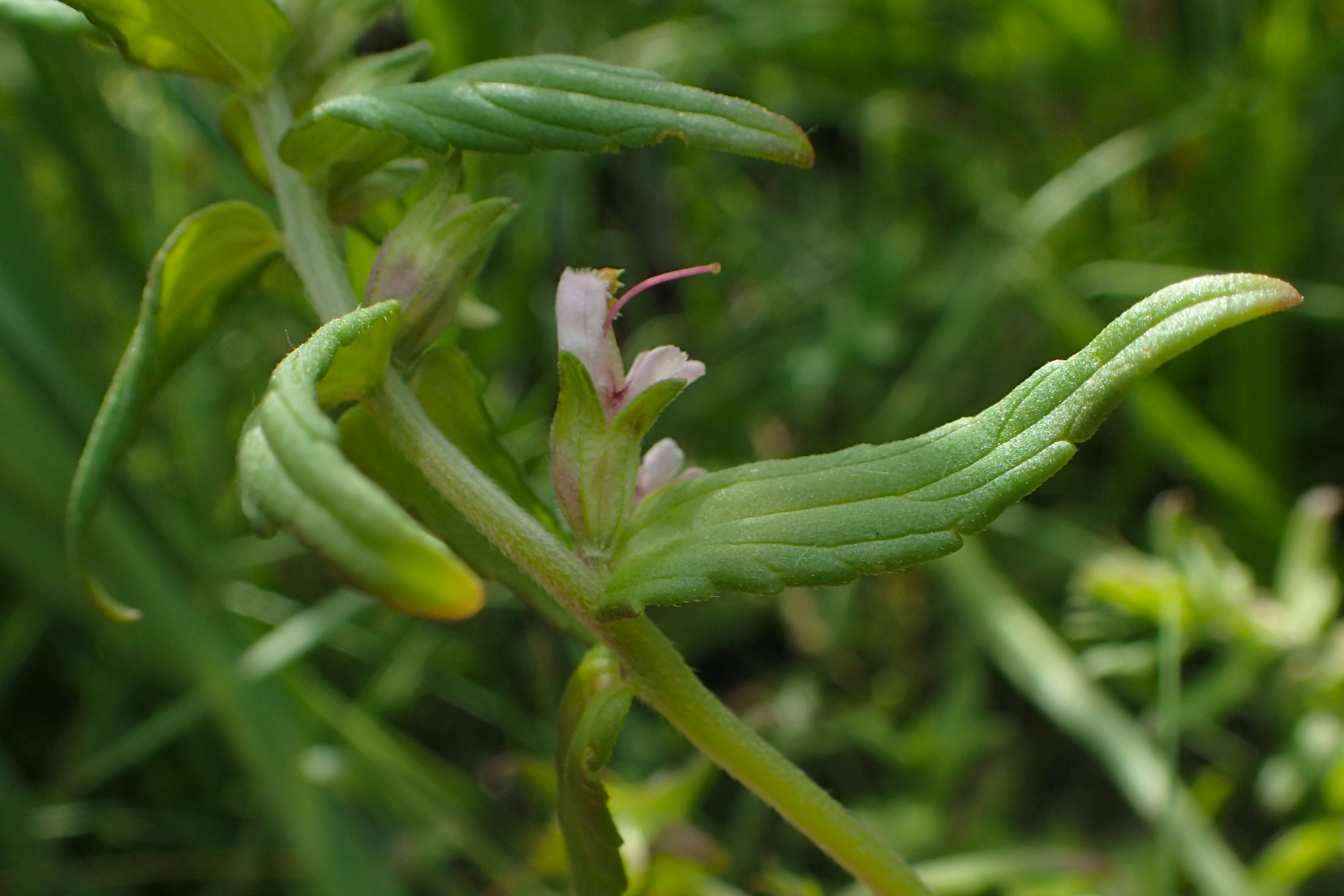

Scientific classification
- Kingdom: Plantae
- Clade: Embryophytes
- Clade: Tracheophytes
- Clade: Angiosperms
- Clade: Eudicots
- Clade: Asterids
- Order: Lamiales
- Family: Orobanchaceae
- Genus: Odontites
- Species: O. litoralis

Binomial name
- Odontites litoralis Fr.

= Odontites litoralis =

Species of flowering plant

Odontites litoralis is a species of flowering plant belonging to the family Orobanchaceae.

Its native range is Northern and Northwestern Europe.
