= Kauklahti =

Kauklahti Köklax
- District of Espoo
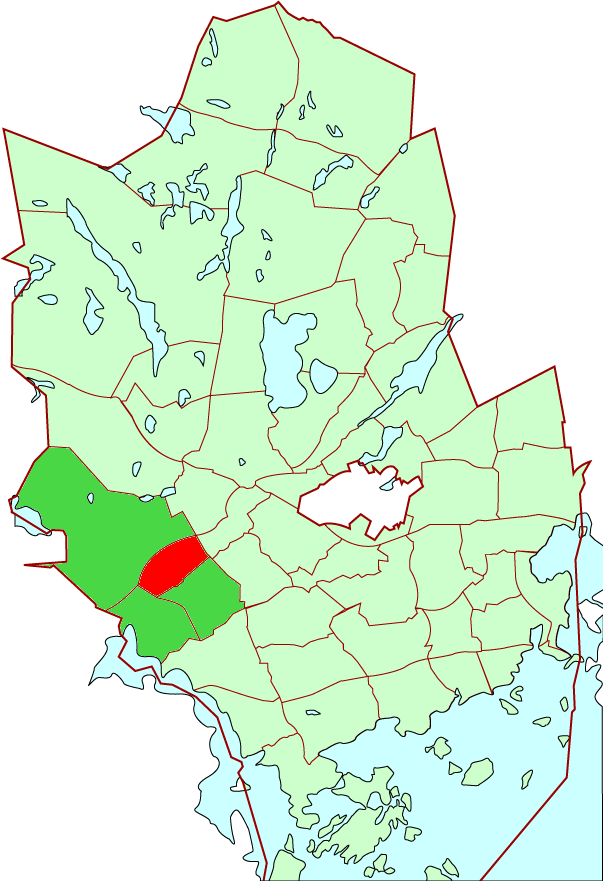
- Location of Kauklahti within Espoo
- Coordinates: 60°11′N 24°37′E
- Country: Finland
- Municipality: Espoo
- Region: Uusimaa
- Sub-region: Greater Helsinki
- Main District: Suur-Kauklahti
- Inner District(s): Kauklahti

Population (2006)
  - Total: 2,949

Languages
  - Finnish: 84.1 %
  - Swedish: 9.3 %
  - Other: 6.6 %
- Jobs: 315

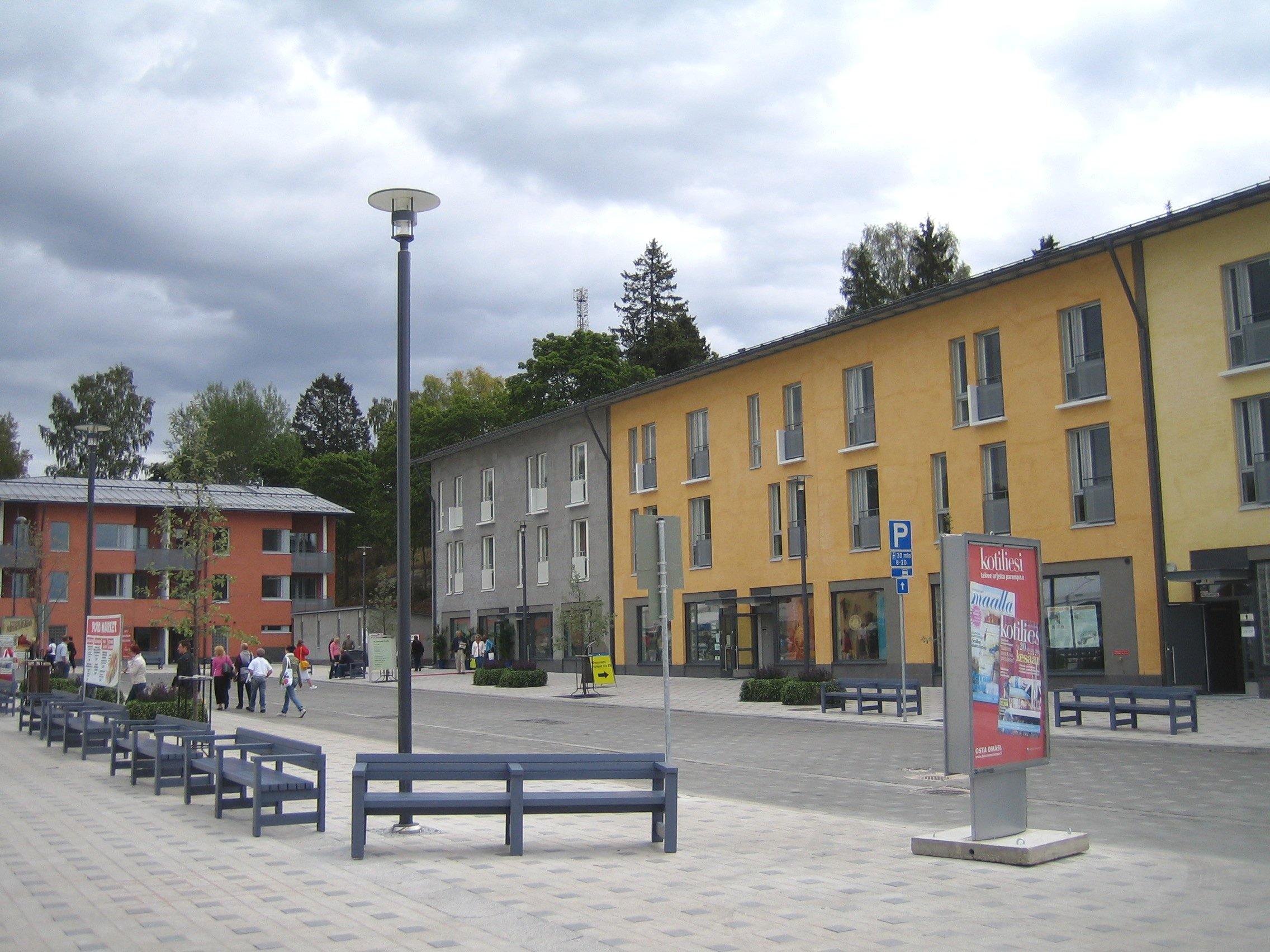
Kauklahti during the 2006 Finnish Housing Fair

Kauklahti (Finnish) or Köklax (Swedish, alternative spelling Köklaks, old Finnish Kaukalaksi) is a district of Espoo, in the Greater Helsinki area of Finland. Kauklahti is growing fast and in 2006 hosted The Finnish Housing Fair.

== See also ==
- Districts of Espoo
