= Ring II =

Road in Espoo, Finland

Coordinates: 60°11′43″N 024°44′37″E

Regional Road 102
- Yhdystie 102 (Finnish); Förbindelseväg 102 (Swedish)
- Ring II: Kehä II; Ring II
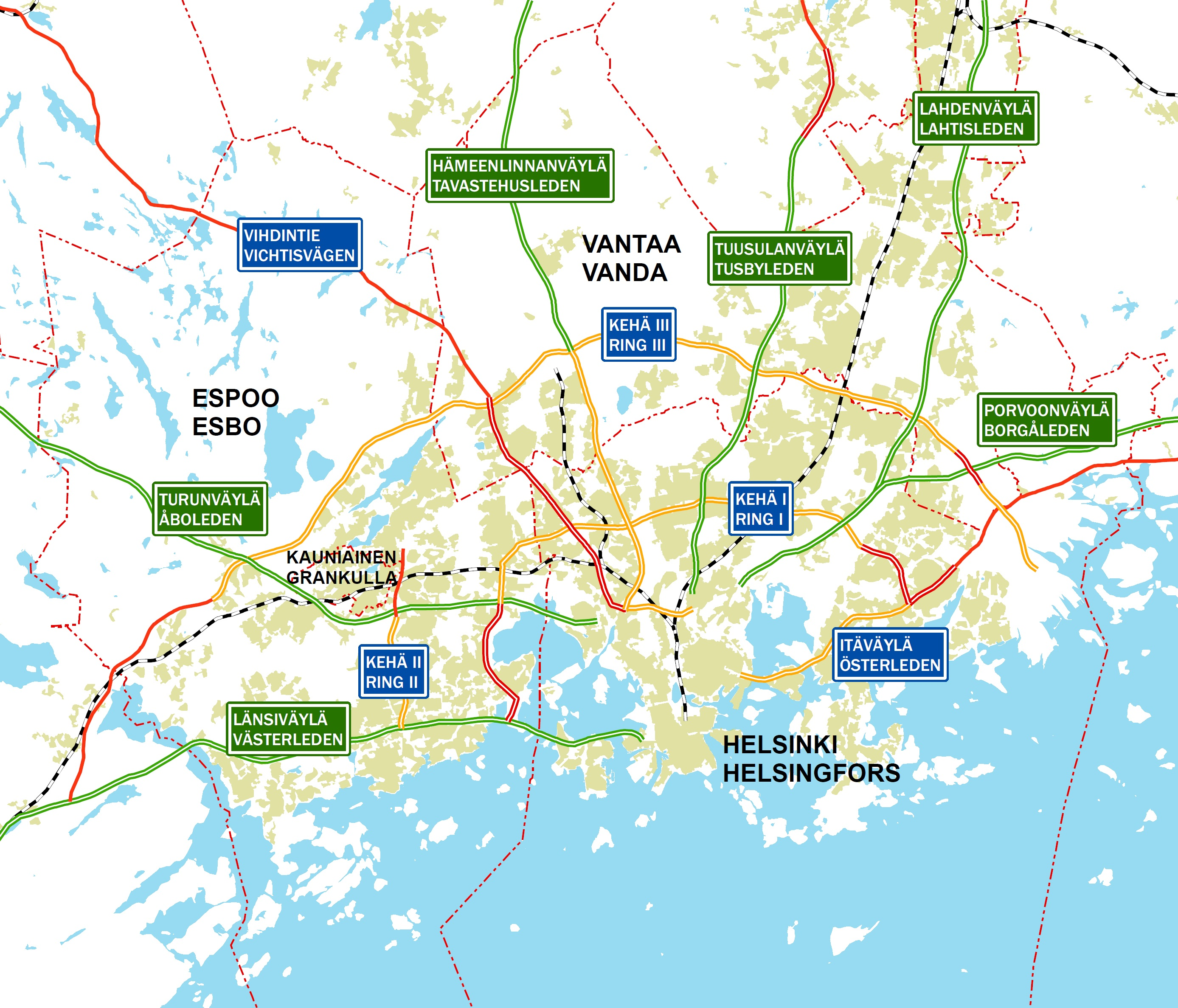

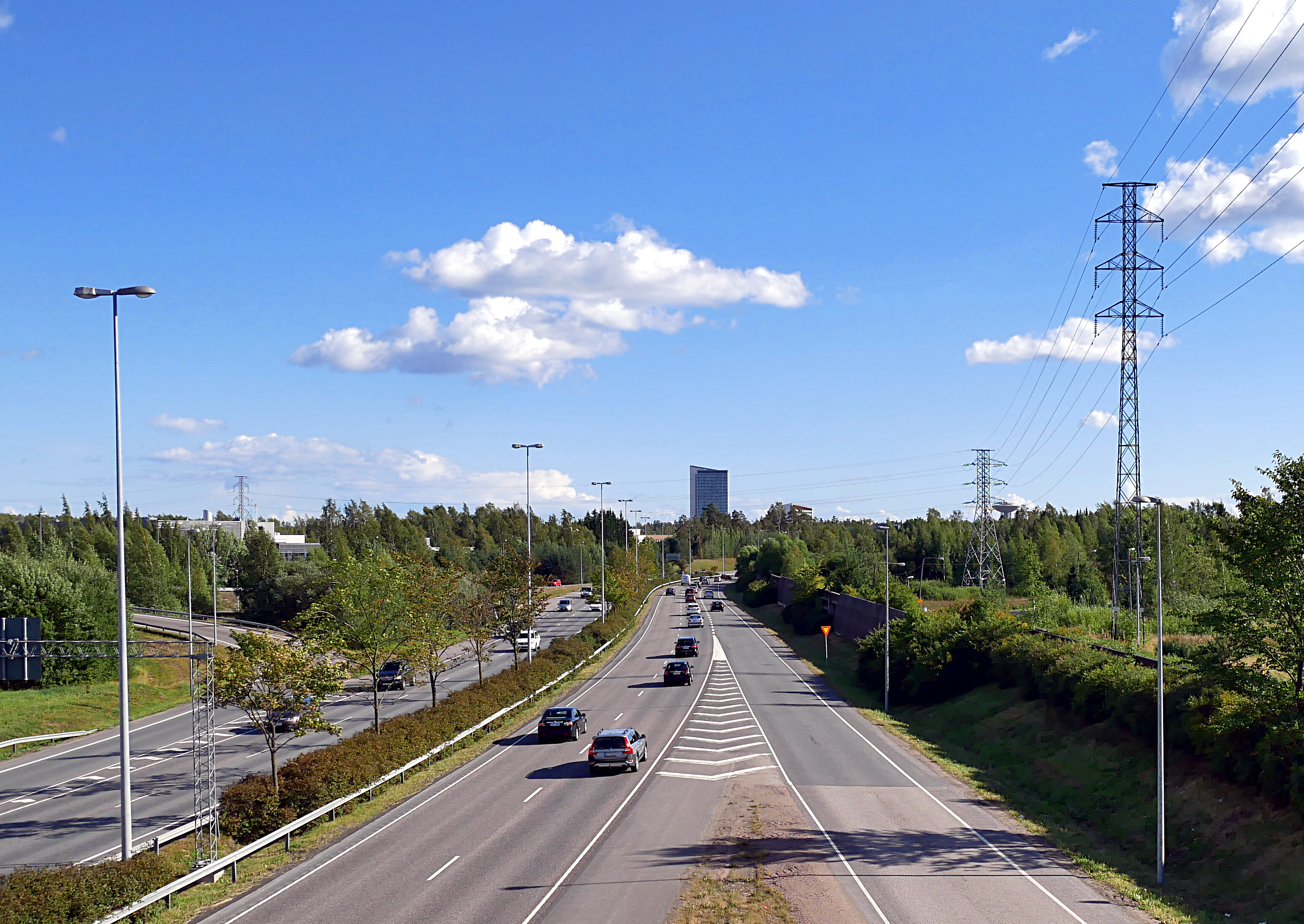

Route information
- Length: 6.8 km (4.2 mi)
- Existed: 2000–present

Major junctions
- From: Turuntie
- To: Länsiväylä

Location
- Country: Finland

Highway system
- Highways in Finland

Ring II (pronounced "ring two", Finnish: Kehä II, Swedish: Ring II; also known as Kilonväylä) in the city of Espoo is one of the major highways in Finland. The road runs north–south, connecting Turuntie in the north, to Länsiväylä in the south. Despite its name suggesting a circle, it has not been built as a true beltway yet, unlike the parallel Ring I and Ring III highways.

== History ==
The road was initially planned in the 1960s, but it was not until the end of 2000 that the first phase was completed.

== Future ==
Since the cross-city traffic in Espoo, Kauniainen and Vantaa is estimated to nearly double by the year 2025, plans have been made to extend Ring II to connect up with Finnish national road 3 (Finnish: Hämeenlinnanväylä) in the northeast and add lanes where the road is currently only one lane wide in each direction. However, in 2019 the land corridors previously reserved for the extension were released.

== See also ==
- Ring I
- Ring III
