= Ring III =

Road in Uusimaa region, Finland

Highway 50
- Kantatie 50 (Finnish); Stamväg 50 (Swedish)
- Ring III: Kehä III; Ring III
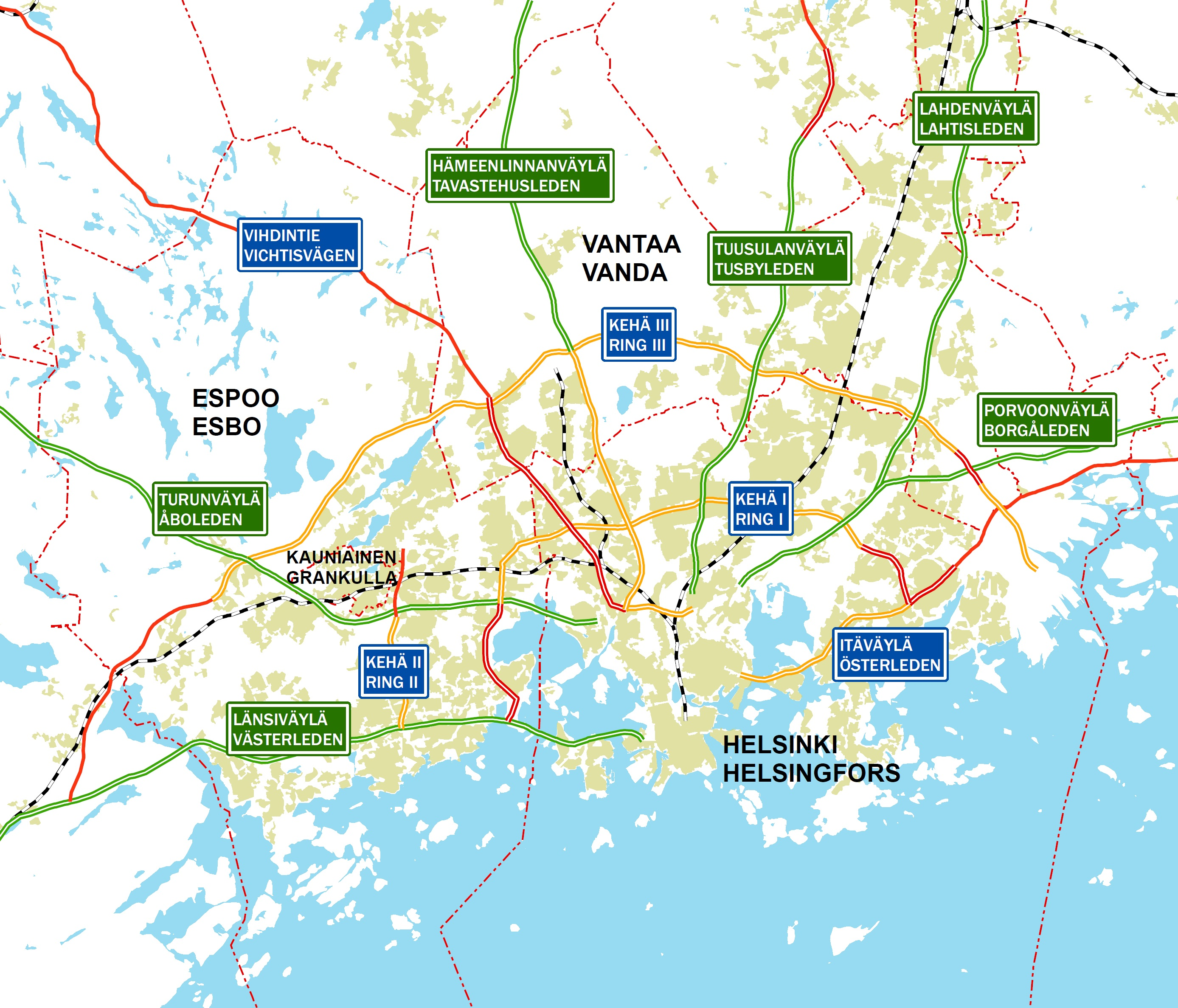

Route information
- Part of E18
- Length: 46 km (29 mi)
- Existed: 1962–present

Location
- Country: Finland
- Major cities: Kirkkonummi, Espoo, Vantaa, and Helsinki

Highway system
- Highways in Finland

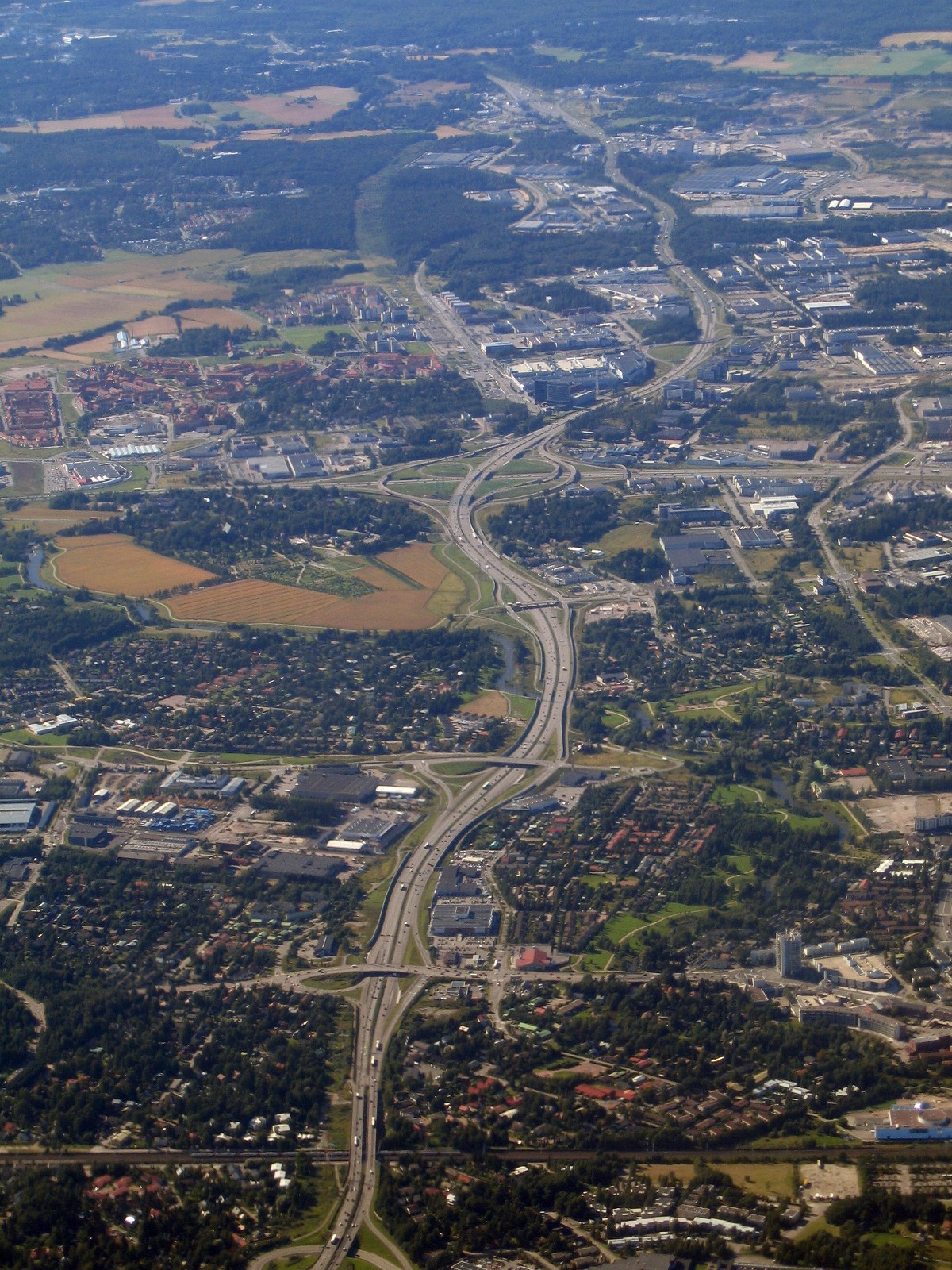
Aerial view of Ring III

Kehä III ("ring three", National road 50; or Finnish: Kehä III or Kantatie 50; Swedish: Ring III or Stamväg 50) is an important highway in Southern Finland. It is the outermost of the three beltways in Helsinki capital region, and the first one to be built. It lies across the four Finnish municipalities of Kirkkonummi, Espoo, Vantaa and Helsinki. Shaped like an arch, the road is 46 kilometres (29 mi) long, of which only a very small fraction passes within the borders of Helsinki itself.

== Overview ==
Work on Kehä III started in 1962, on the base of an existing road. The construction was finished in 1972, initially with only one lane per direction. Most parts of the road have since been expanded to at least two lanes per direction, although the westernmost end is still one-lane per direction in places.

The most recent construction work has been extensive renovation on its busiest stretch in Vantaa, where several interchanges have been built or improved, and lanes added. Industrial development along the road has introduced higher volumes of heavy traffic.

The European route E18 is routed through Kehä III, bypassing central Helsinki.

Kehä III is often informally or jokingly considered the outer border of the Helsinki area, because most of the urban development of the capital region is inside the ring. The road itself doesn't follow any legal border and rural and urban landscapes can be found on both sides of it.

The new zone system for fares in the HSL area mostly follows the borders of Kehä III.

== History ==
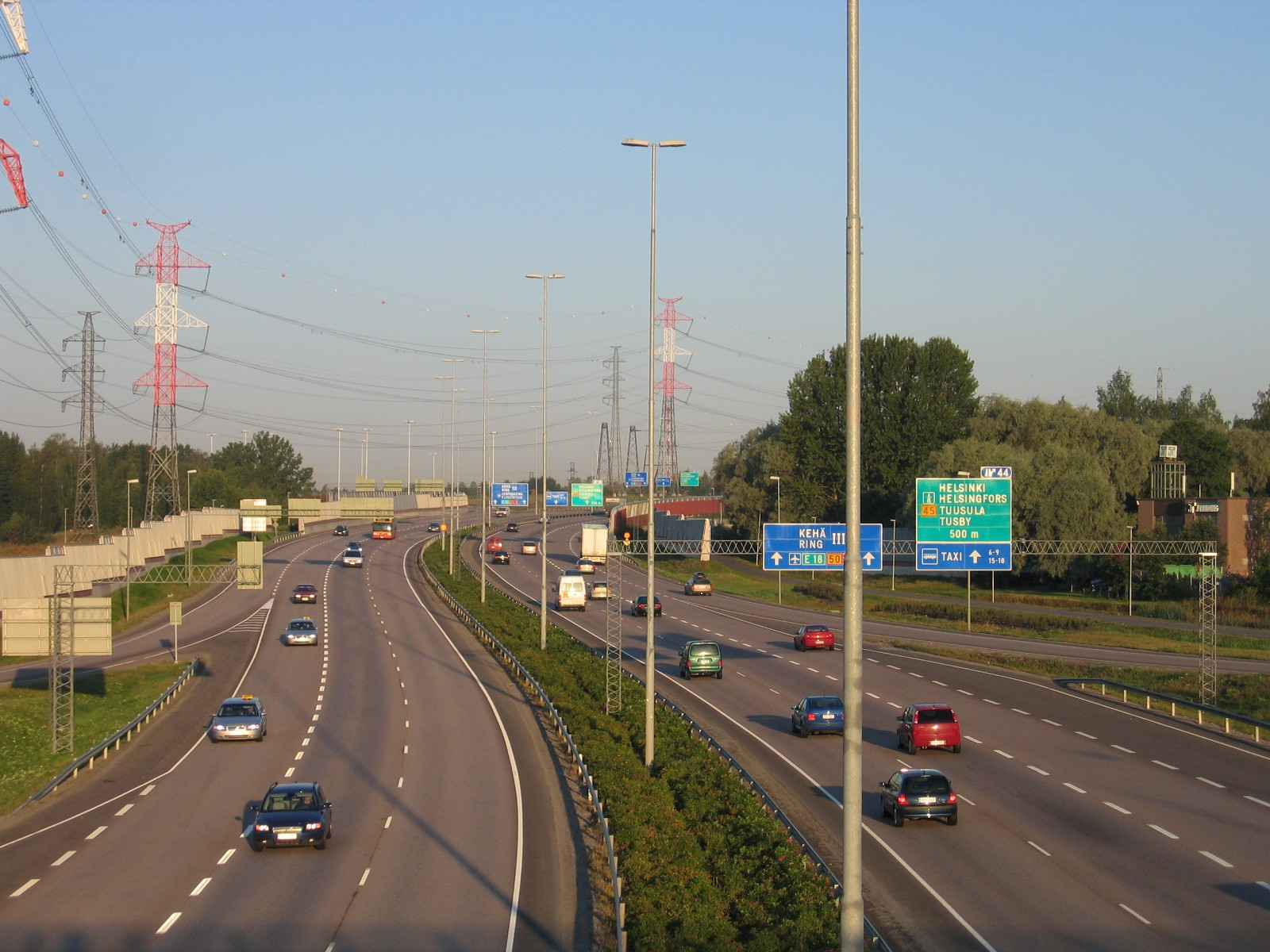
Ring III in Vantaa, looking west.

The beginning was constructed between 1962 and 1965 from Bemböle to Länsisalmi and the continuation to Jorvas was completed in 1968. Originally, each road was two lanes wide. The amount of traffic grew considerably over time and as a result the original intersections with Helsinki's exit roads became dangerous. Therefore, all intersections with the city exits had been rebuilt as interchanges by the beginning of the 1970s. The road has undergone almost continual modification and widening throughout its existence as traffic has increased in the region.

In the mid-1970s, the road between Tikkurila and Helsinki-Vantaa Airport was renovated and 10 years later the road was expanded to four lanes up to Vihdintie. At the end of the 1980s, the road was extended to Muurala and then once again one kilometer farther to the west. This same stretch was rebuilt shortly afterwards when it was expanded to four lanes up through Gumböle during the 1990s. Throughout the 1980s, stretches of Kehä III were completed to the Lahti motorway and to the Porvoo motorway in the 1990s. The road to Vuosaari Harbour, completed in 2007, extends from the eastern endpoint of Kehä III. At the start of the 2000s, major improvements were made to the heavily used stretch from Tikkurila to Helsinki-Vantaa Airport: the road was widened to 6 lanes and Tuusulanväylä motorway's intersection was rebuilt as a large system connection.

When the road was originally built, it was simply called the "Ring road", but the planning of the other two major roads caused confusion. Therefore, it was called Kehä III from the 1970s onward.

== See also ==
- Kehä I
- Kehä II
- Kehä IV (planned)
- Vihdintie
- Tuusulanväylä
