= Leppävaara tower =

High-rise building in Espoo, Finland

Coordinates: 60°13′14.41″N 24°48′49.35″E

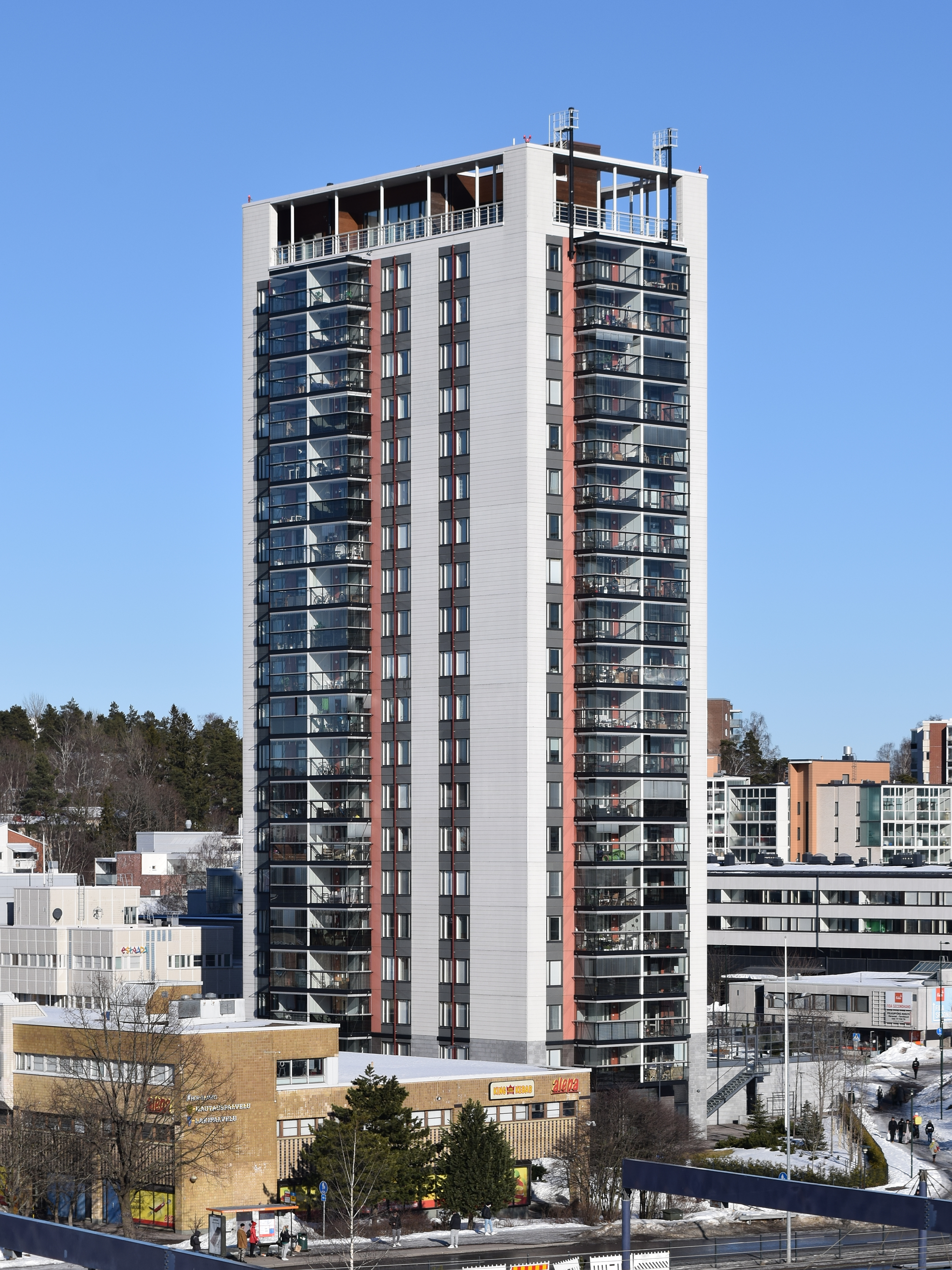
The Leppävaara tower in March 2022.

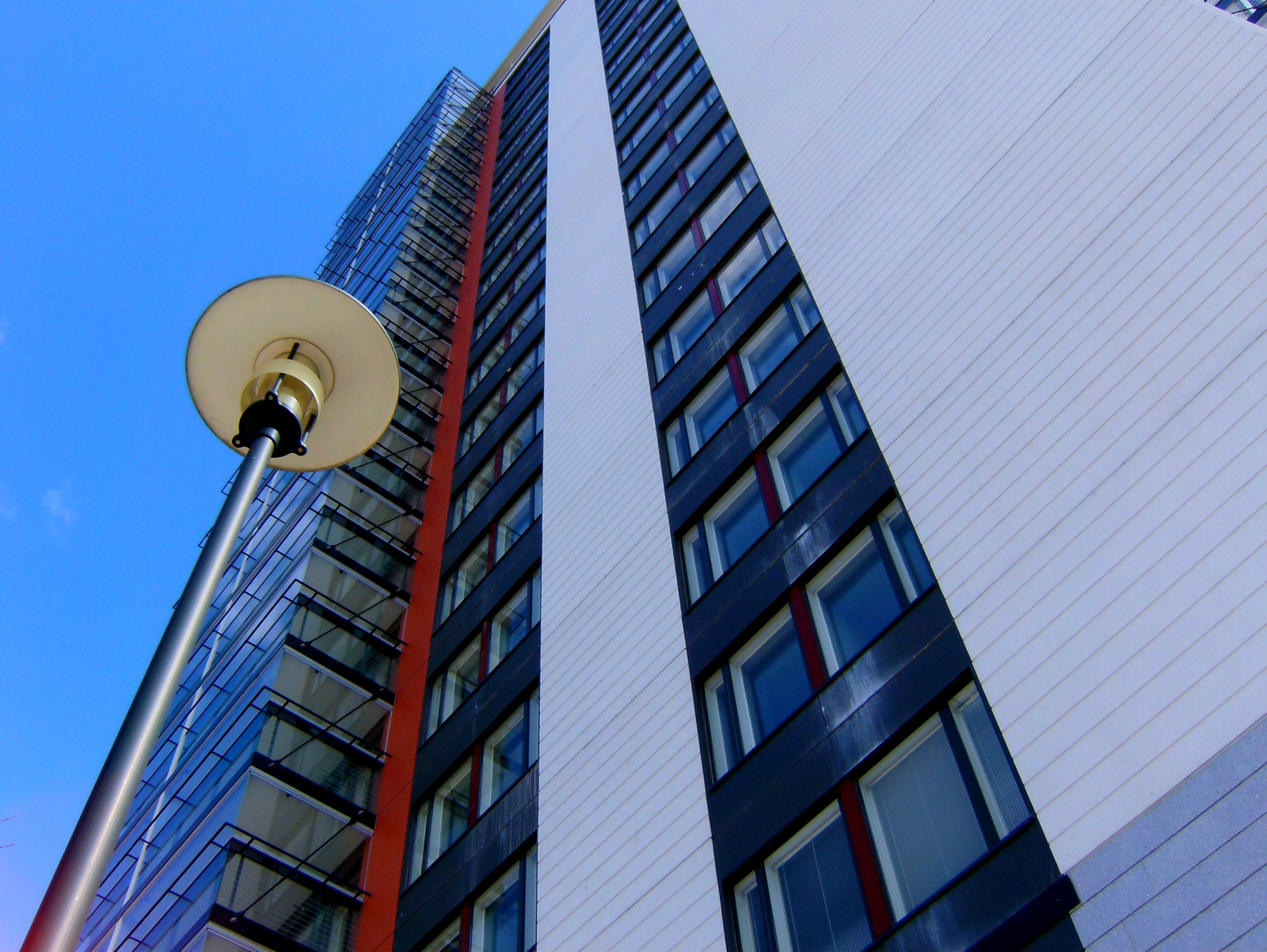
The facade of the building uses natural granite slabs and white concrete.

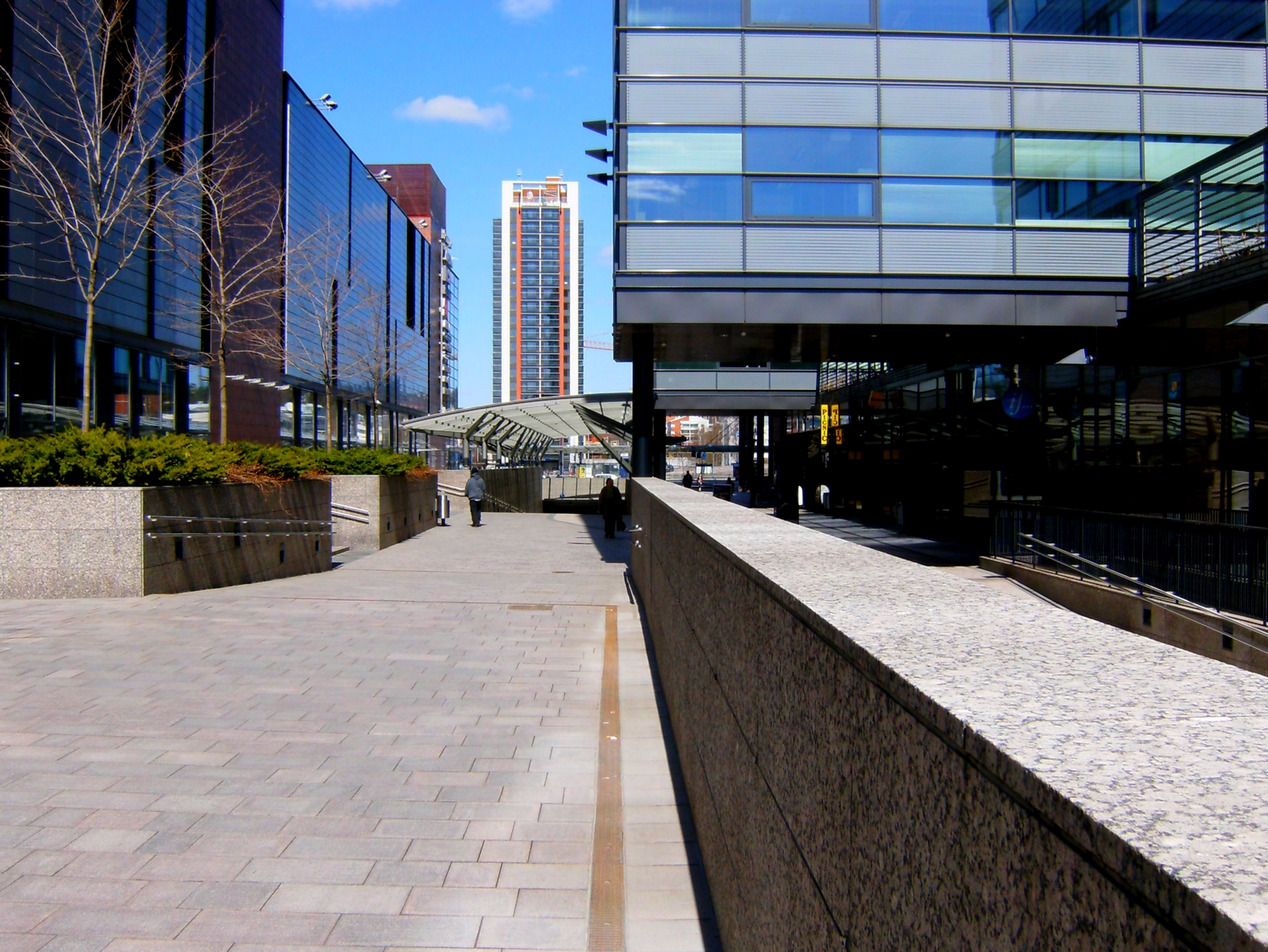
The Leppävaara tower seen from the base of the Panorama Tower.

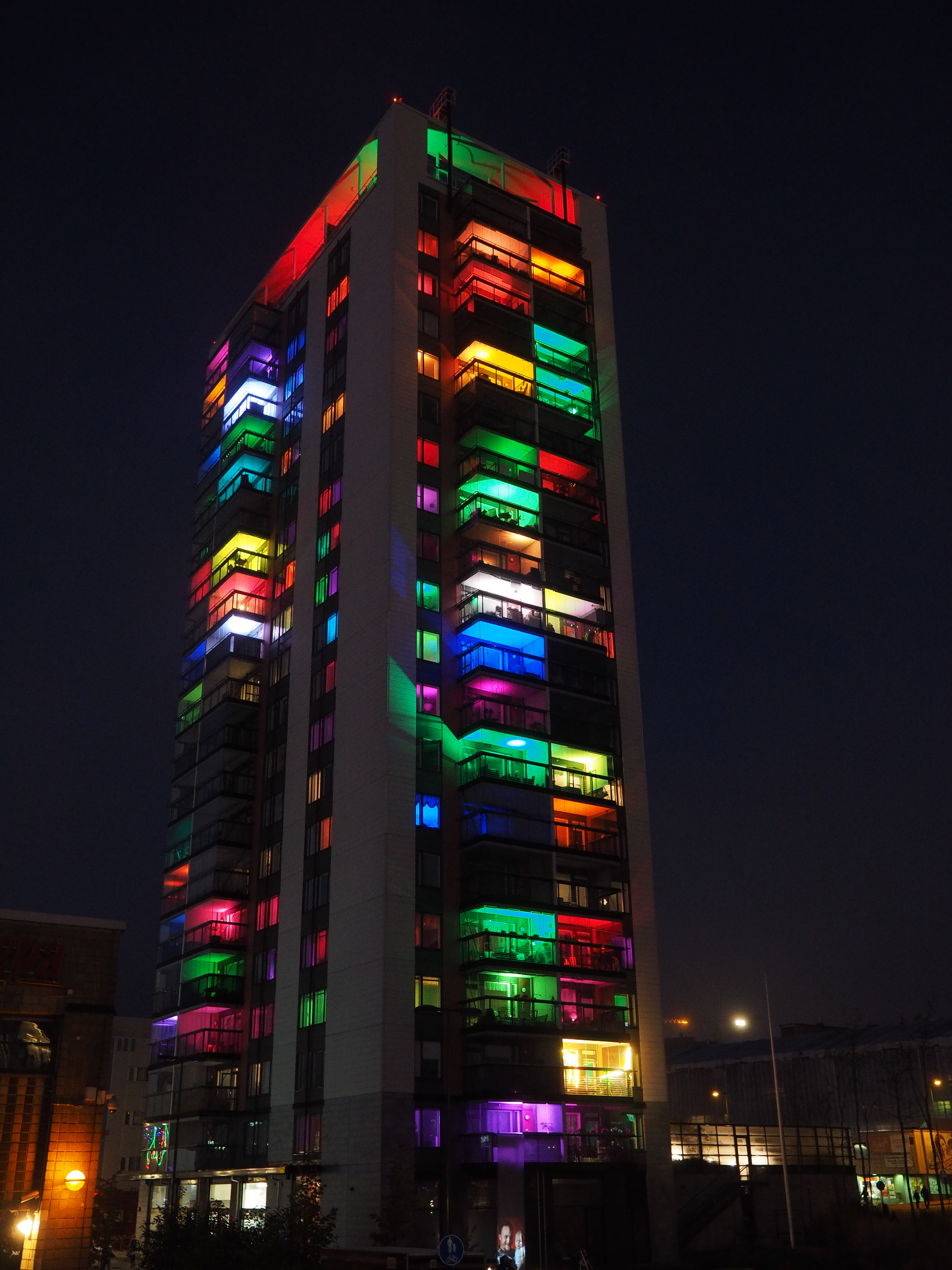
The Leppävaara tower illuminated in October 2017.

The Leppävaara tower is a high-rise building in Leppävaara, Espoo, Finland, located at Valurinkuja 2. The building is located right next to the Leppävaara railway station and the Sello shopping centre. The building is 68 metres tall and has 21 floors. It is the third highest residential building in Espoo after Niittyhuippu and Meritorni.

== Overall ==
The building was constructed by Skanska and was designed by Timo Vormala from the architecture bureau Gullichsen Vormala Arkkitehdit Ky. The building has 113 apartments, which have either two or three bedrooms and whose surface areas range from 44.5 to 77.5 square metres. All apartments have balconies with sliding glass windows and most of them have their own sauna. The ground floor of the building and its wing contain two business premises. The top floor has a corporate sauna, a club room, a patio and technical spaces. The second floor has a gym for tenant use. Because of lack of space, the patio was built on top of the side wing, and was protected with glass walls because of noise. The building has two stairwells. The building has two elevators with access from the entry floor to the top floor. The apartments, the balconies, the storage rooms, the corporate sauna and the club room have been equipped with a fire extinguishment system. On the very top of the building is a helicopter landing platform, allowing rescue of tenants in case of fire. 79 electric car parking spaces from the nearby parking garage have been reserved for the tenants. The building has a 10G/10G fiber optic network and a broadband network.

== Construction ==
=== Lot ===
The lot for the tower had originally been designed for an office building. The original plan had specified 16 floors for the building, like in the Panorama Tower located across the railway track. The plan was for a pair of twin towers to form a gate to Leppävaara. Floors in office buildings are usually higher than in residential buildings. Because of this, the main architect sought a change in the zoning plan to increase the number of floors to 20, so that it height would almost correspond to that of the Panorama Tower. The city council of Espoo approved the plan in autumn 2005, but a complaint about the plan detailed the project by over a year. As well as this, Skanska had to delay the start of construction because of a depression in sales of apartments in the capital area. Construction was finally started in August 2008.

The architecture bureau made a 3D model of the building and all of its technical features. As well as this, Enterprixe Oy made a floor-by-floor production model of the Leppävaara tower, which was used in the construction. The base of the lot is loose clay and so the foundation had to be supported with beams, which numbered 58 in total. The ground had no sideways stability, so the building had to be anchored into the rock with tensed diagonal cables.

=== Framework ===
Construction of the framework of the lower floors started with casting molds for the walls and installing outer wall elements connected to them. Construction proceeded one apartment at a time. As soon as a floor's elements and vertical molds had been installed, installation and equipment of the arch mold as well as electrical and water works and steel support started. The supporting structures of the building are elements. All of the inner walls on the first floor have been cast in place, from the second to the eighth floor they have been partly cast in place because of the tension in the structure. The thickness of the walls between the apartments is 240 mm from the second to the sixth floor and 200 mm on other floors. The outer walls are mostly covered in white concrete and partly surfaced sandwich elements. The facades on the bottom two floors use natural granite slabs, and partly sandwich and surface elements.

Construction took approximately five workdays per floor. From the ninth floor upwards the inner walls changed into elements and the floors could be finished in four days. The framework was topped off in late September 2009. In late October roof work was done, which was finished just in time for winter. The water floor is an even floor insulated with rubber bitume. The building was completed in 2010.
