= Leppävaara =

Leppävaara Alberga
- District of Espoo
- Location of Leppävaara (red) within Espoo (light green) and Suur-Leppävaara (dark green)
- Coordinates: 60°13′N 24°49′E
- Country: Finland
- Region: Uusimaa
- Sub-region: Greater Helsinki
- Municipality: Espoo
- Main District: Suur-Leppävaara
- Inner District(s): Pohjois-Leppävaara, Etelä-Leppävaara, Mäkkylä, Lintukorpi, Lintulaakso, Uusmäki, Lintumetsä, Perkkaa

Area
  - Total: 6.4 km^{2} (2.5 sq mi)

Population (31.12.2018)
  - Total: 32,095
  - Density: 5,000/km^{2} (13,000/sq mi)

Languages
  - Finnish: 87.6 %
  - Swedish: 4.2 %
  - Other: 8.2 %
- Postal Code(s): 02600, 02650
- Jobs: 10,398

Leppävaara (Swedish: Alberga) is a district of Espoo, a city in Finland. The Rantarata rail line and the Ring Road I, the busiest road in Finland, cross in Leppävaara, thus making it a major traffic hub in the Greater Helsinki region. The Sello Shopping Centre is also located in Leppävaara.

== History ==
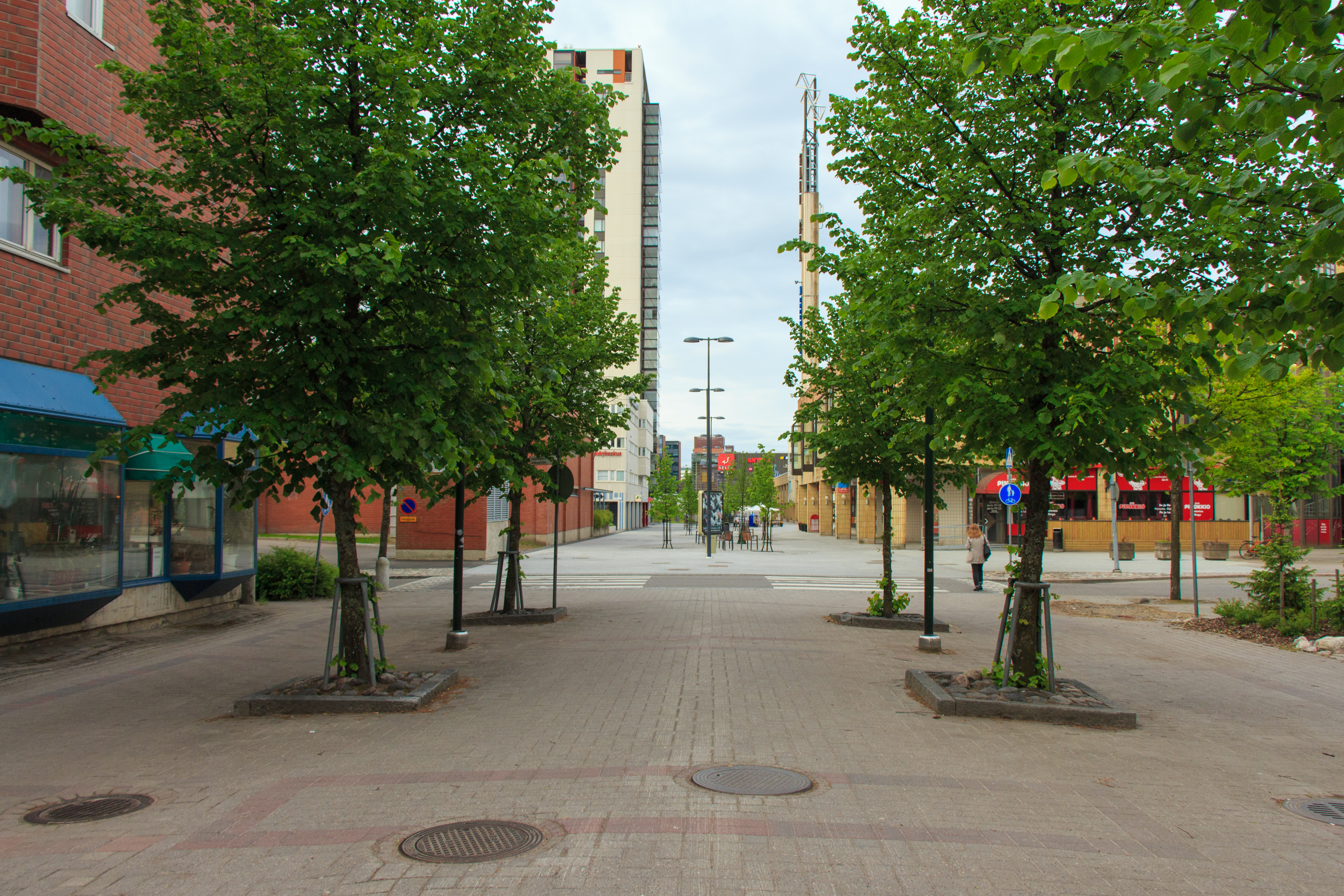
Leppävaaranraitti pedestrian street in Leppävaara

=== Leppävaara before the railway line ===
There is evidence of residence in Leppävaara already in the Stone Age. There is a burial pile from the Bronze Age in the Leppävaara sports park, near the exercise path leading to Karakallio. The medieval village hill of Konungsböle is located near the golf practice ground on Säterinniitty at the end of Leppävaarantie.

The Alberga manor was founded in the area in the 1620. The Leppävaara manor is also located in the area, and the Kilo manor is located nearby. The oldest surviving building in Leppävaara is the Gransinmäki inn built in the 1830s, located on Vanha Maantie. The best known and most historically significant build is the new main building of the Alberga manor, known as "Sokerilinna" ("the sugar castle"), built in 1874 for the sugar manufacturer Feodor Kiseleff the younger.

=== From the 1900s to the 1960s ===
After the railway line from Helsinki to Turku was completed in 1903 Leppävaara began to develop as a manor neighbourhood. The villa known as Ylänne was built in Leppävaara. The bulk of the settlement was on the northern side of the railway and the southern side remained mostly in agricultural use. During World War I, Krepost Sveaborg, a fortification system of trenches and artillery batteries defending Helsinki was built, passing through Leppävaara. Though some of them are destroyed, there are still a lot of trenches and bunkers in the area, mainly in Vallikallio and Mäkkylänmetsä.

Leppävaara was formed as a community in 1921 and it remained such until all such ones at the beginning of 1956 were abolished. In the early 1960s as well as the separating also of Leppävaara, Tapiola from Espoo was designed as a town but the plans were rejected when Espoo at the beginning of 1963 was formed on the whole as a town.

In Eliel Saarinen's 1915 "Suur-Helsinki" plan the architect proposed considerably large scale buildings around the Leppävaara railway station. Until the late 1950s inhabitation of Leppävaara only consisted of small detached houses. The first modern apartment building was built in 1958 in Puustellinmäki at Postipuuntie 5. A total of 25 new apartment buildings were built in Puustellinmäki and Vallikallio, until the new construction in the entire area was forbidden in 1964.

=== From the 1970s onwards ===
The Leppävaara area remained mostly unbuilt until the 1980s, when urban development began on the area north of the railway line. The area on the southern side of the railway however stayed in agricultural use until the 2000s, but is now a very urban neighbourhood. The planning of the area was slowed especially by the disagreements between the municipalities of Helsinki and Espoo as a large part of the area was for a long time in the possession of the city of Helsinki even though it was located inside the borders of Espoo.

New apartment buildings were built in Perkkaa in the 1970s and in northern Leppävaara in the 1980s. Southern Leppävaara only started developing in the late 1990s around the site of the old Maxi hypermarket. Before this, the southern side of the railway tracks only contained the Maxi hypermarket, a few detached houses and a large amount of farmland. Zoning of the area was hindered by disagreement between municipalities, as a large part of the area was actually owned by the city of Helsinki despite being located in Espoo. Southern Leppävaara has been built fairly rapidly and has developed into an urban central area in a short time. Today most of the apartments in the entire district are located in apartment buildings.

The Vermo race track was built in eastern Leppävaara, right next to the border to Helsinki, in 1977. The Leppävaara church was built in northern Leppävaara in 1979.

In the 2000s large office blocks and high-rise buildings have been built in southern Leppävaara, such as the Panorama Tower (2008) and Sellonhuippu (2011). The 21-story-high Leppävaara tower residential building was built to the northern side of the railway track in 2010.

== Transport ==
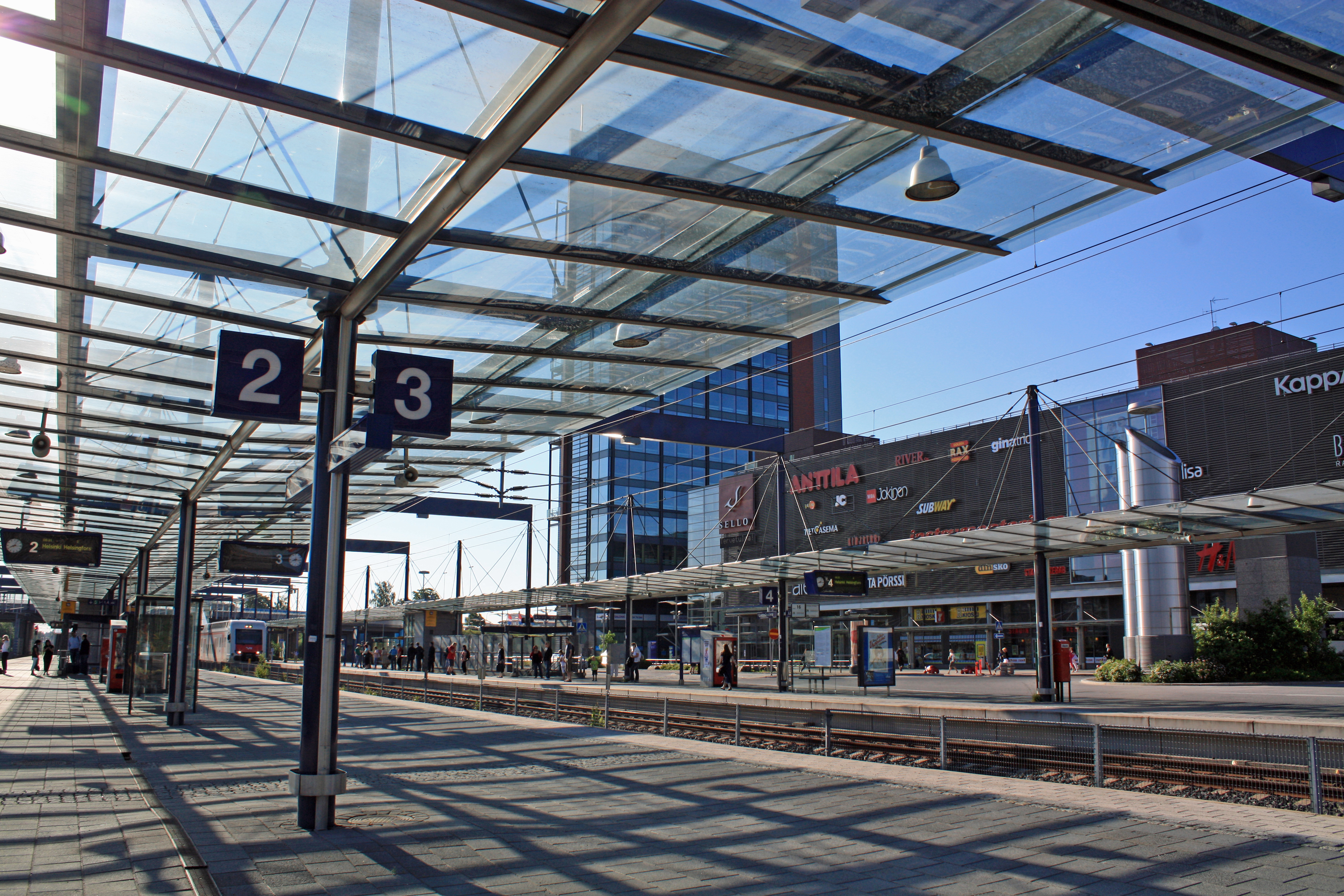
The Leppävaara railway station and the Sello shopping centre.

Leppävaara is a significant traffic hub. It is located at a place where the Ring I beltway crosses the Rantarata railway leading from Helsinki to Turku, of which the part between Leppävaara railway station and Helsinki Central railway station belongs to the Helsinki commuter rail network. Right next to the railway, the Finnish regional road 110, also known as Turuntie, passes through Leppävaara. As its name says, the Turuntie road is part of the historical road leading to Turku. The current Finnish national road 1 passes Leppävaara about a kilometre to the south.

The Leppävaara railway station is served by Helsinki commuter trains A, E, L, U, X and Y. Since 2015 long-distance trains between Helsinki and Turku also stop at the station.

The Helsinki City Bikes network extended to Leppävaara in spring 2018. The area has 32 city bike stations.

Helsinki light rail line 15 has 6 stops in Leppävaara. Stops are (from East to West): Ravitie - Vermo - Perkkaa - Leppävaara station / Leppävaaran asema - Albergan esplanadi - Linnoitustie.

== Education ==
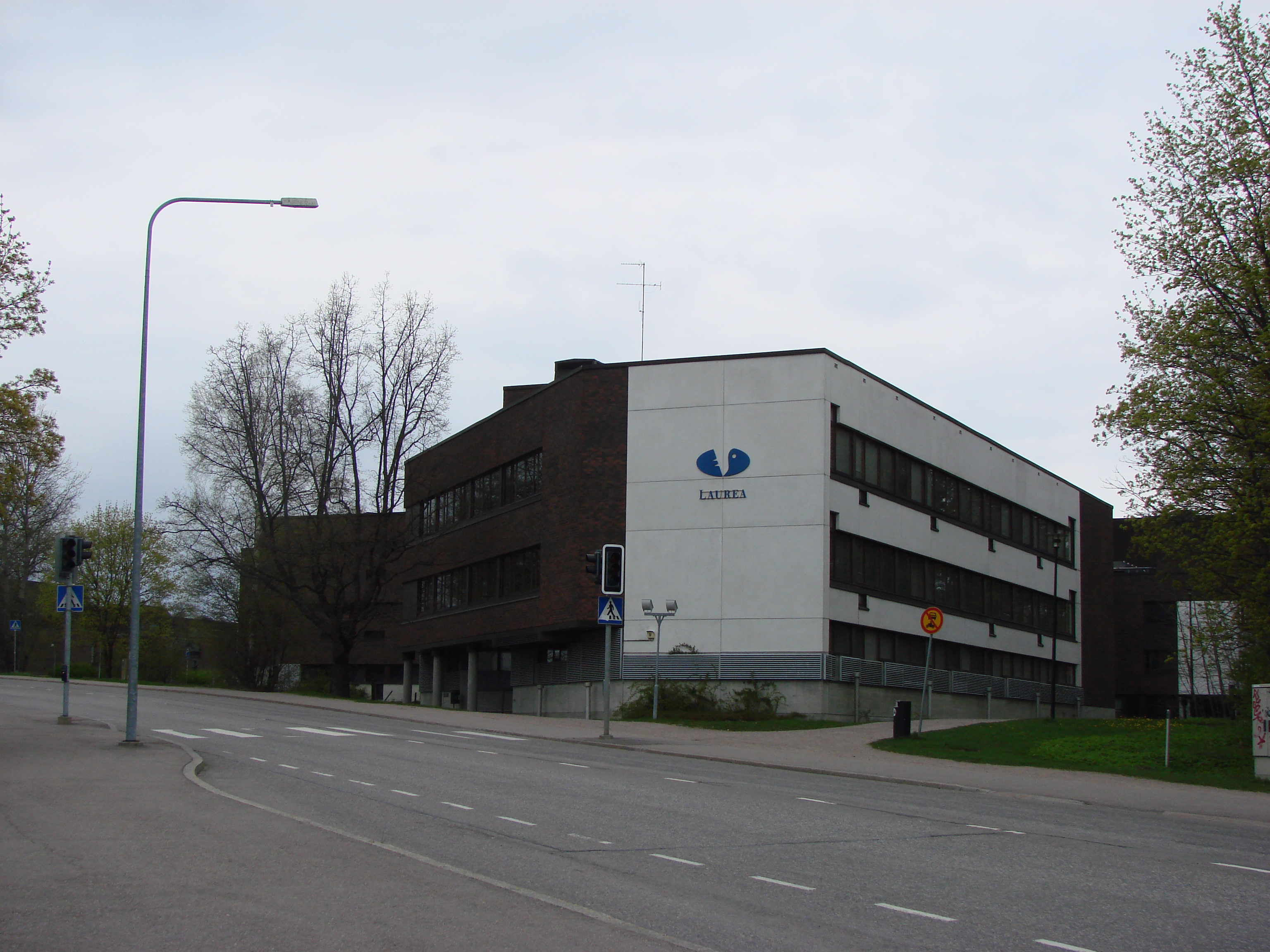
The Leppävaara campus of the Laurea University of Applied Sciences.

There are five primary schools in Leppävaara: the Leppävaara school (classes 7 to 9), the Perkkaa school (pre-primary education and classes 1 to 9), the Postipuu school (classes 1 to 6), the Ruusutorppa school (classes 1 to 9) and the Veräjäpelto school (classes 1o to 10). Leppävaara also houses the Leppävaara gymnasium which also has a line concentrating on physical exercise.

The Omnia academy for applied sciences in Leppävaara has studies for metalwork and electricity. As well as the renovated old premises and new premises built in 2010 and 2011, Leppävaara has new premises for studies in finance, information technology and building engineering.

Leppävaara also houses the Laurea University of Applied Sciences and a workers' academy. The Finnish School of Watchmaking founded in Tapiola currently has its premises in the old library in Leppävaara. The Metropolia University of Applied Sciences previously had its premises in Pohjois-Leppävaara but has since moved to Karamalmi after the city of Espoo announced that the campus had seriously deteriorated.

The national special academy and training facility Live University of Applied Sciences is located in Puustellinmäki.

== Sports ==
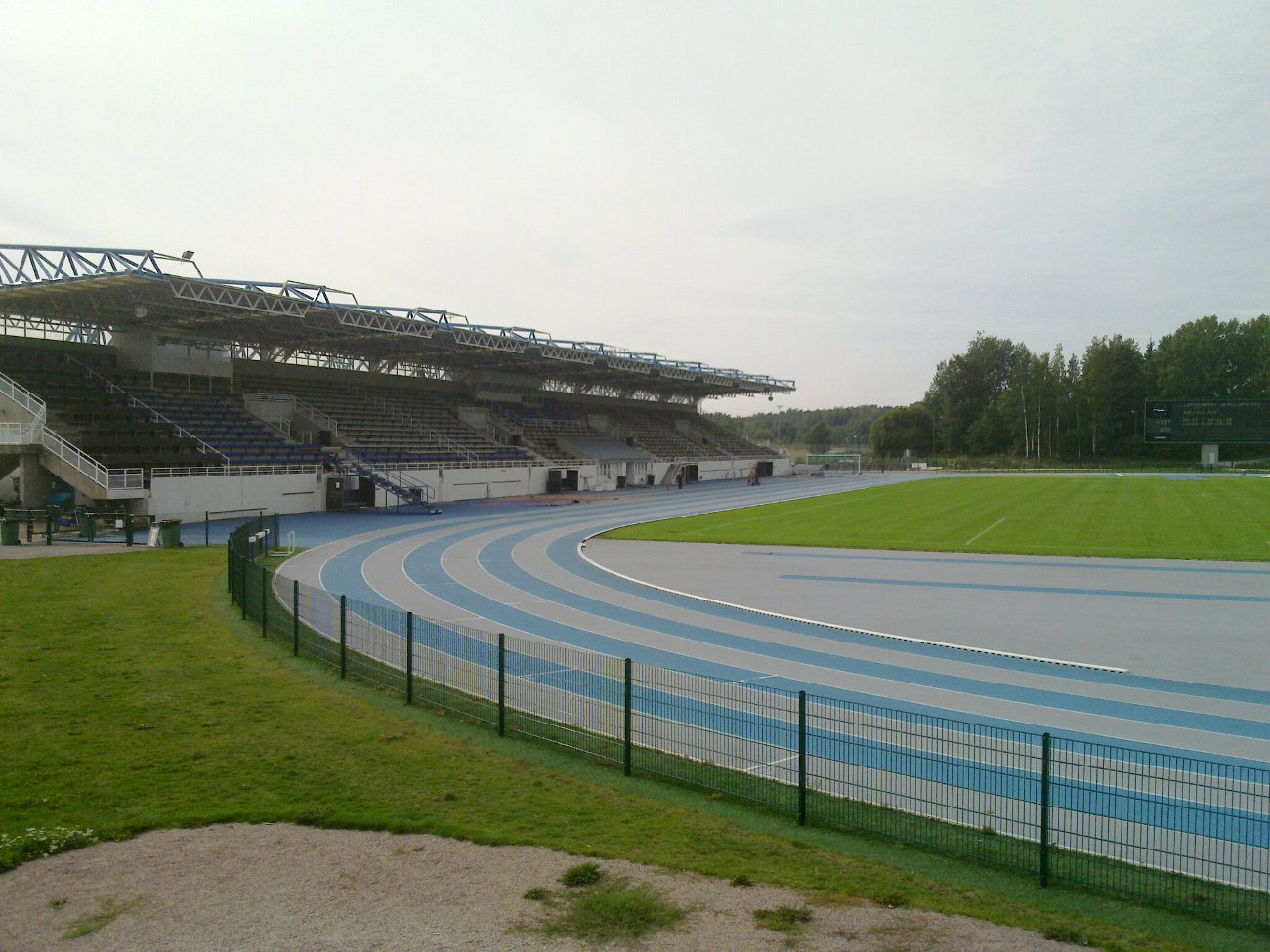
The Leppävaara sports park.

Leppävaara provides diverse services for sports and exercise. The Leppävaara sports park is located north of the railway, containing a stadium which hosted the European Championships in handicapped sports in 2005. The park also has a football field, a skiing stadium, a race track, an ice hockey hall with two rinks, the Leppävaara swimming pool and a summertime lido opened in 2016. South of the railway is one of the largest golf practice fields in Finland, also hosting green card courses. The Vermo horse racing track is one of the most notable horse racing tracks in Finland.

== Culture ==
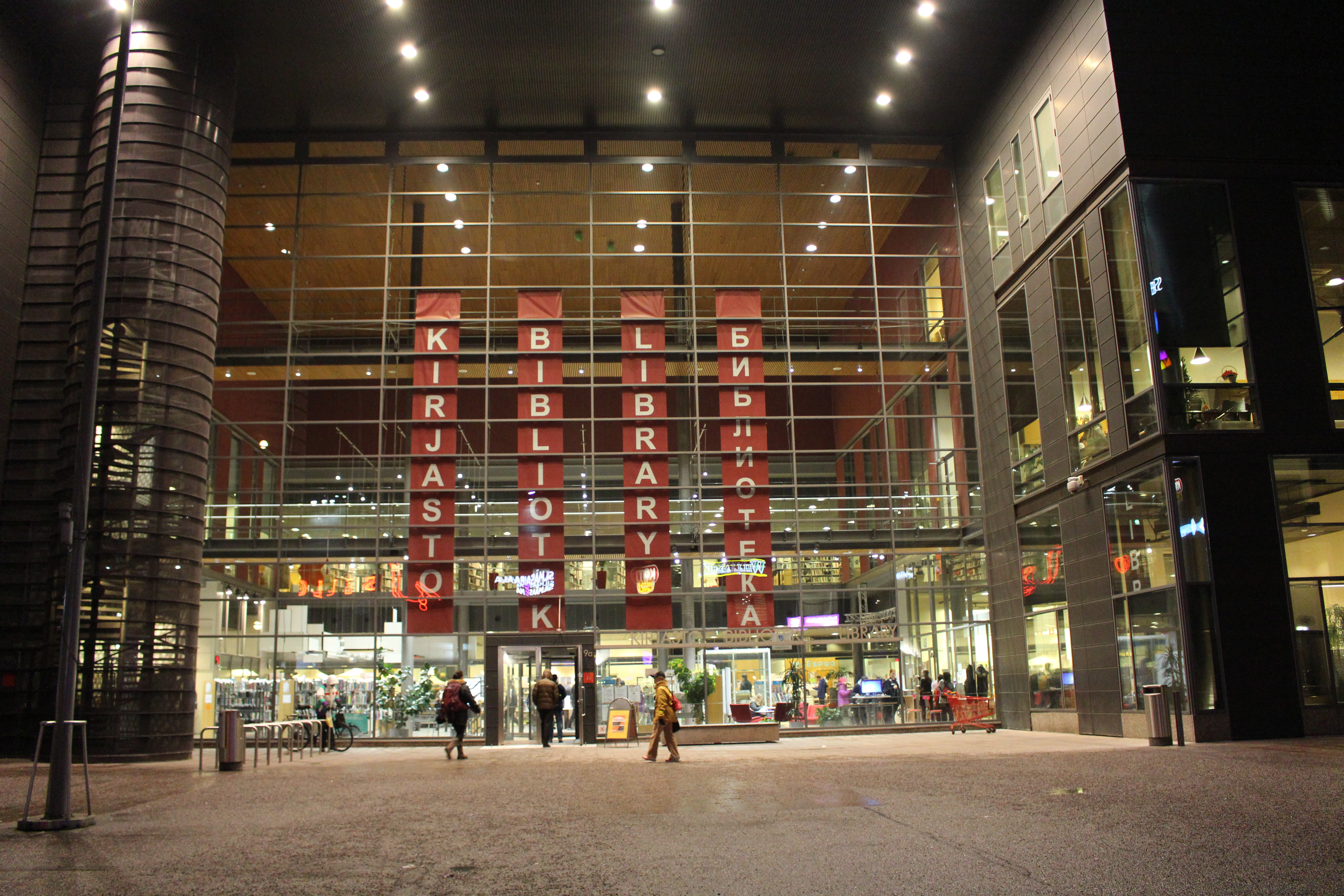
The Sello library.

The Sello hall in southern Leppävaara provides diverse cultural services. The programme includes classical and popular music concerts, exhibitions, movies and children's events. The Sello library, the most popular library in the Helsinki capital region in terms of number of attendees, is located right next to the Sello hall. In addition to normal library services it also hosts various exhibitions and events.

The leisure complex Sello Rex (now known as Sello Vapaa-ajankeskus) to the west of the Sello shopping centre was completed in October 2008, with a Finnkino movie theatre complex with six auditoriums, a bowling alley with 14 tracks and numerous restaurants.

Leppävaara hosts the Leppävaaraviikot local event annually in September, organised by local organisations.

The common nickname for Leppävaara amongst locals is 'Lepuski' in Finnish, or 'Lebuski' in Swedish.

== Tall buildings ==
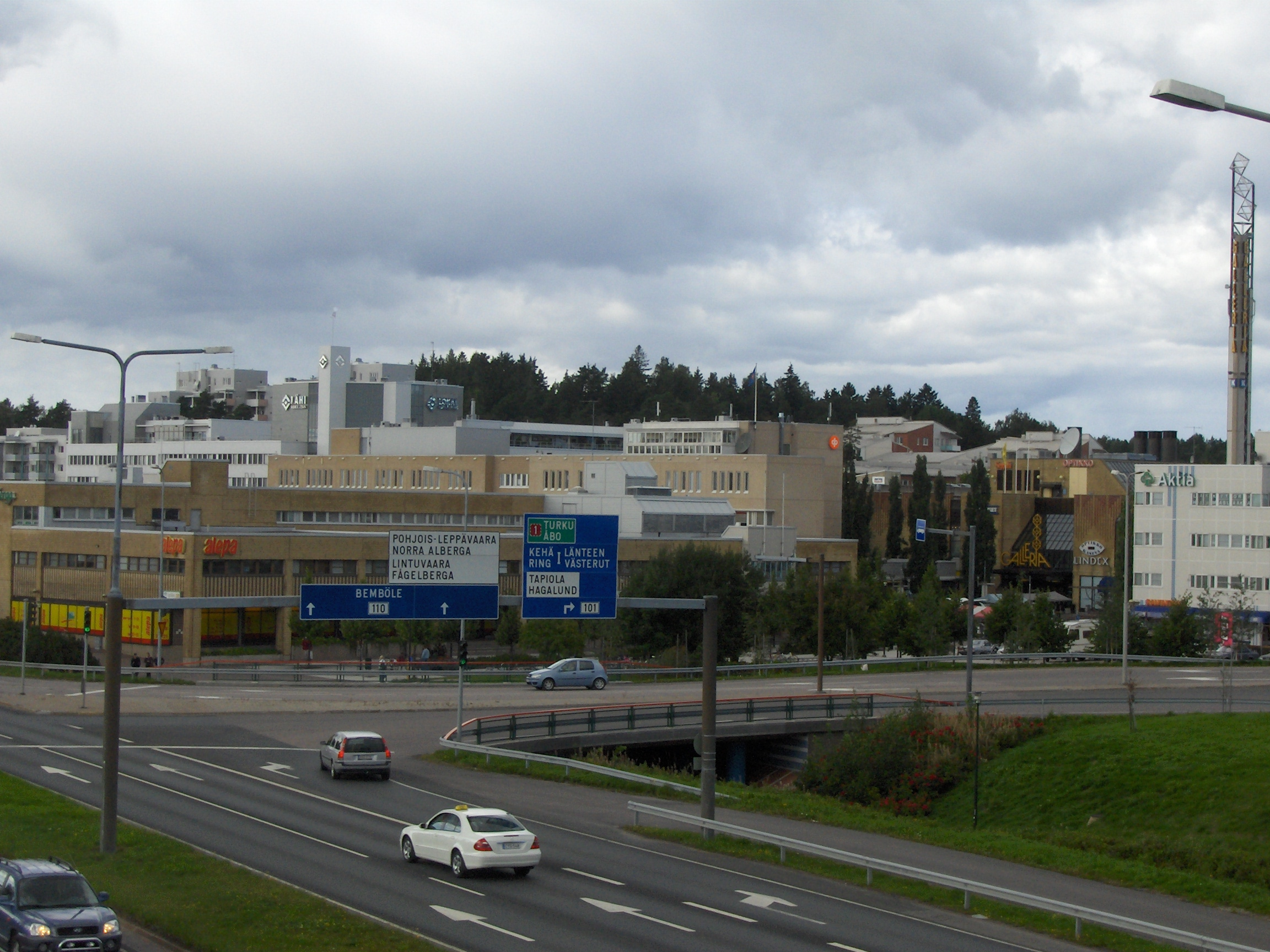
A view towards the Turuntie street and the Galleria shopping centre before the Leppävaara Tower was built.

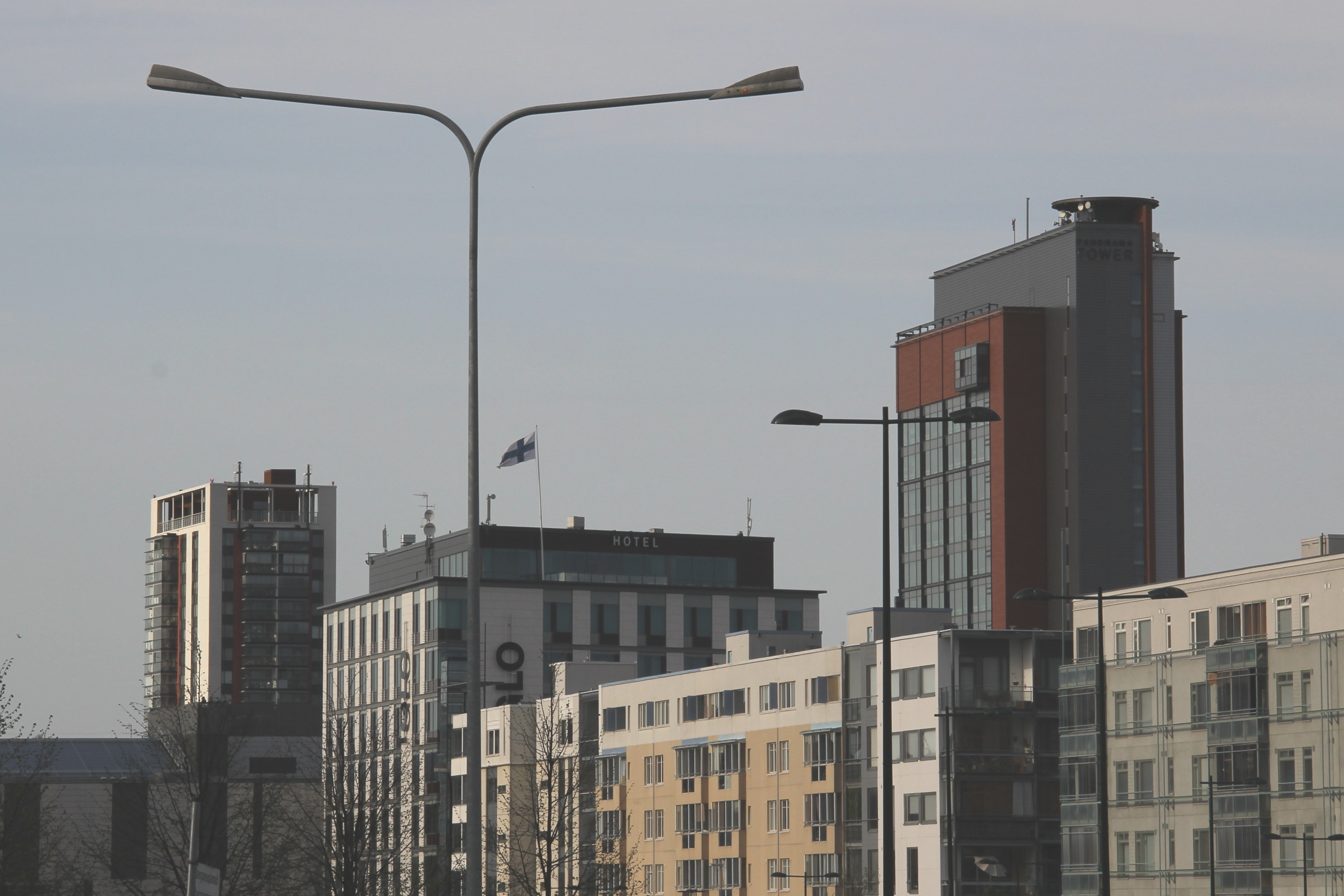
The Leppävaara Tower (left) and the Panorama Tower (right).

There are three high-rise buildings in Leppävaara. The Panorama Tower, the third-highest office building in Finland, is owned by the insurance company Varma. The building was completed in March 2008. The tower has 17 floors and is 76 metres high. The Leppävaara Tower has 21 floors and is 68 metres high. The residential tower was completed in autumn 2010. The third high-rise building Sellonhuippu was completed in October 2011 and has 17 floors.

== See also ==
- Districts of Espoo
- Sello mall shooting
