= Sello =

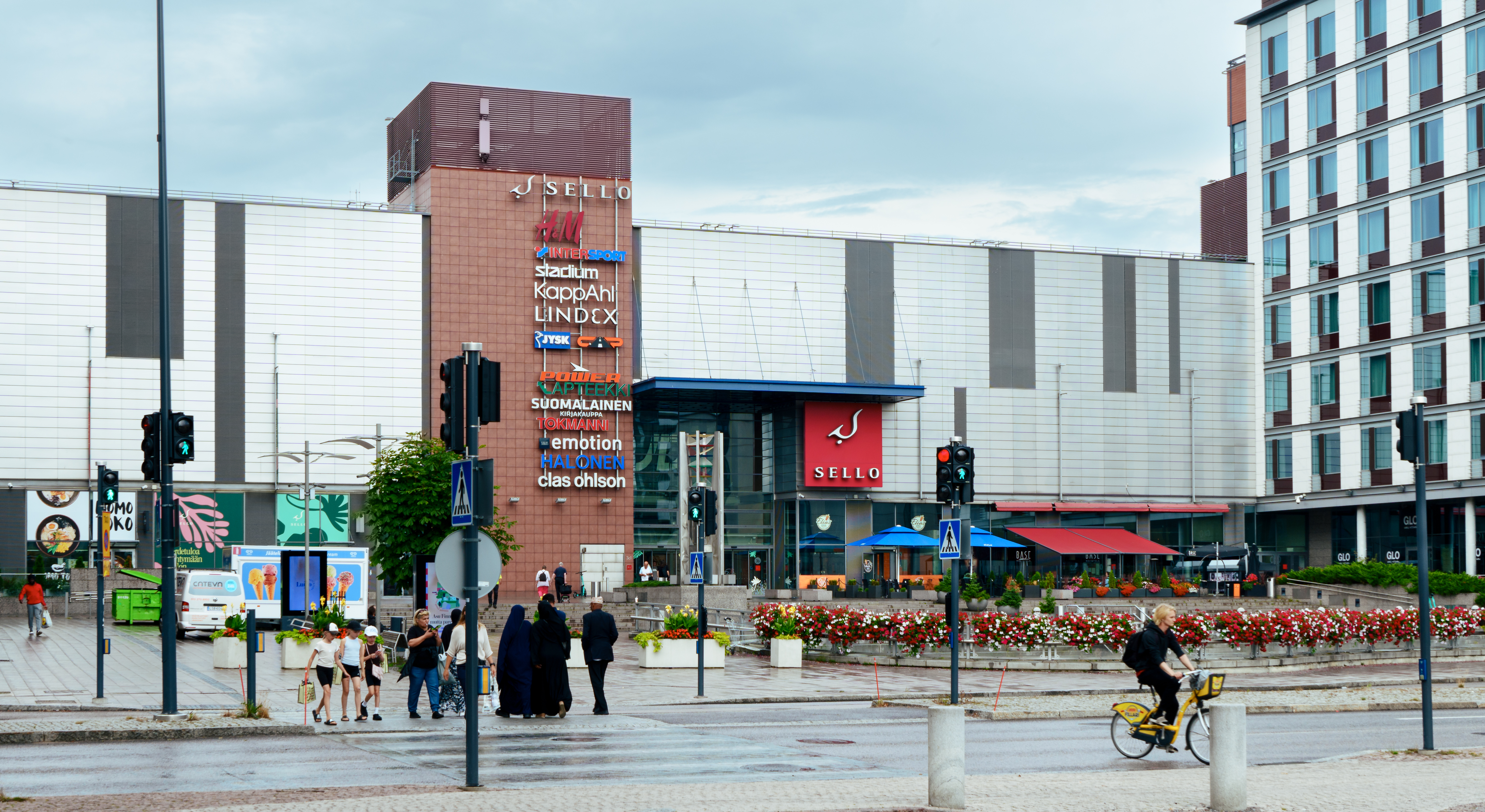
- Location: Leppävaara, Espoo, Finland
- Coordinates: 60°13′05″N 024°48′39″E
- Opened: 2003/2005/2008
- Manager: Matti Karlsson
- Architect: Helin & Co Arkkitehdit
- Num. of stores: 170
- Floor area: 102,000 m^{2} (1,100,000 sq ft)
- Floors: 4
- Parking: 2,500 bays
- Website: www.sello.fi

Sello (Finnish for cello) is a shopping mall in the Leppävaara, Espoo, Finland. The mall contains more than 170 shops and services including a concert hall and a library. The largest stores in the shopping center are Prisma, K-Citymarket, Power, Tokmanni, Halonen, H&M, and Intersport Megastore.

The Sello is separated into three parts: the oldest part (finished in 2002), the second part (finished in 2005) and the newest part (finished in 2008). The oldest part of Sello has two hypermarkets, three banks, contains Espoo City's main library, a concert hall, gym, restaurants and cafes, pharmacy, an Alko and a music academy. The second part of Sello has many restaurants and smaller stores, and multiple sport stores such as Intersport and Stadium. Sello's third and newest part was designed to have a movie theater, several restaurants and a bowling alley. Sello also has a hotel named Hotel Sello, property of the Palace Kämp Group.

It is served by Leppävaara bus station and Leppävaara railway station immediately to the north, with Ring I running just to the east.

On 31 December 2009, five people were killed during a shooting spree in the mall.

== History ==
The first phase of the huge construction project at a central location started on 6 February 2003. The Maxi building, Finland's oldest hypermarket built in 1971 and located right next to the construction site, was demolished soon after the completion of the first phase of Sello, when construction of the second phase was started. The Maxi hypermarket was open for the last time on 1 February 2003.

Stores opened at the completion of the first phase included K-Citymarket and the "new Maxi" opposite it, which was open for a little over a year before it was changed to a Prisma store of the HOK-Elanto cooperative after the merger of Elanto and Helsingin Osuuskauppa. The Prisma store was opened on 28 April 2004. The second phase of Sello was opened on 14 September 2005. It brought over 160 new stores and services to the shopping centre.

In late 2008 the cinema and entertainment centre Sello Rex (now known as Sello Vapaa-ajankeskus) was opened, bringing the number of businesses to over 170.

The Panorama Tower high-rise office building with 17 floors was built on the lot to the east of Sello in 2008. The Leppävaaran torni high-rise apartment building with 21 floors was built to the north of the railway track opposite the Panorama Tower was built in late 2010, and the 17-floor apartment building Sellonhuippu was built next to the cinema in October 2011.

== See also ==
- Itis shopping centre, in East Helsinki
