= Sello mall shooting =

Mass shooting at a mall in Espoo, Finland

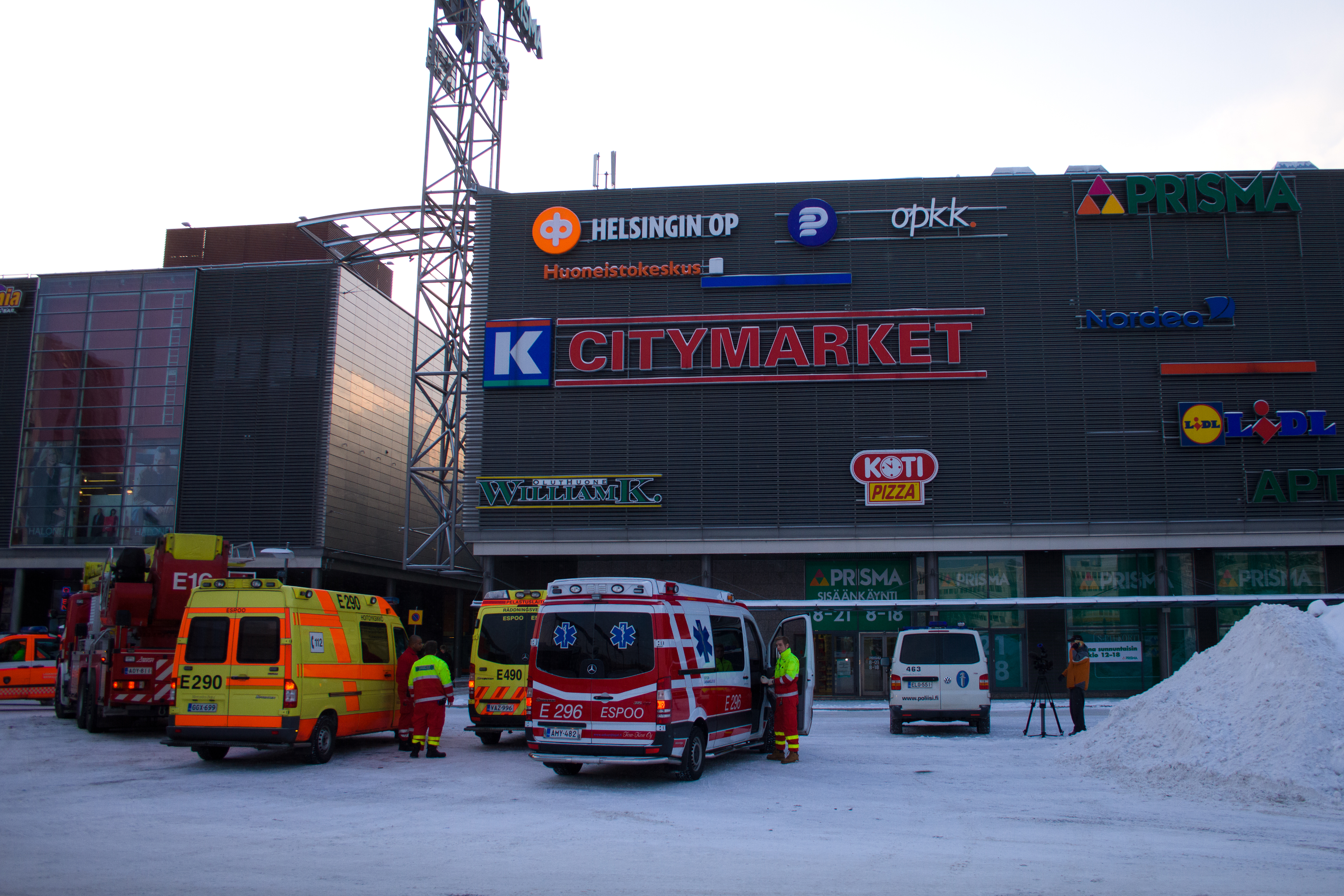
- Emergency vehicles outside Sello after the shooting
- Location: 60°13′05″N 024°48′39″E; Leppävaara, Espoo, Finland
- Date: 31 December 2009 c. 10:08 – 11:13 (UTC+2)
- Target: Girlfriend at her home; Prisma shop in Sello Mall
- Attack type: Spree shooting, murder–suicide, mass shooting, stabbing
- Weapons: Smith & Wesson-branded hunting knife; 9mm CZ 75 pistol
- Deaths: 6 (including the perpetrator and his ex-girlfriend at her home)
- Injuries: 0
- Perpetrator: Ibrahim Shkupolli
- Motive: Resentment of Prisma, Revenge for perceived Adultery

The Sello mall shooting occurred on the morning of 31 December 2009 shortly after 10:08 local time at the Prisma hypermarket in Sello mall, located in the Leppävaara district of Espoo, Finland. Ibrahim Shkupolli, Albanian born in Yugoslavia but had lived in Finland for many years, shot three men and one woman who all worked at Prisma. Before the shooting, he had killed his ex-girlfriend at her home. After the shooting, Shkupolli left the mall and killed himself in his own apartment.

The Sello mall, which opened in 2003, is the largest in the Nordic region with over 170 stores. On the day of the shooting the mall contained between two and three thousand customers. Witnesses described the gunman as calm when walking out of the grocery store in the mall immediately after the shooting.

== Shooting ==
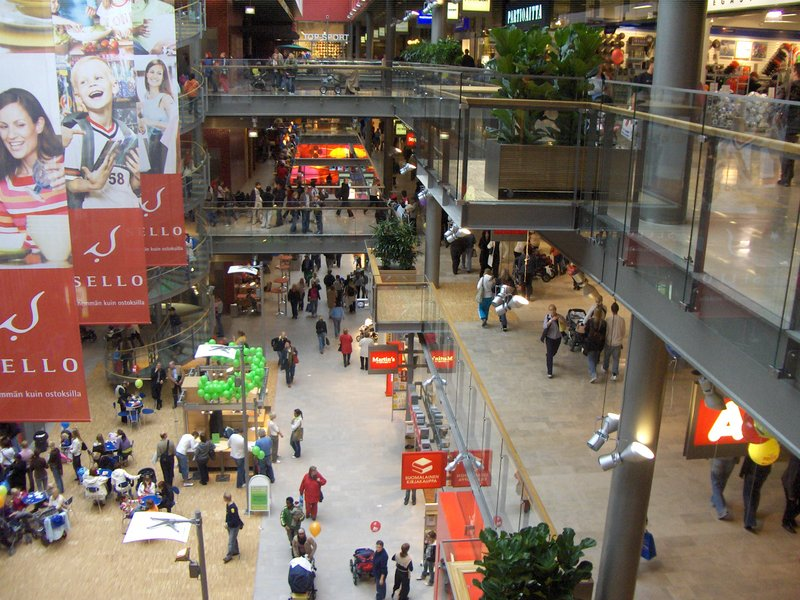
Interior of the Sello mall in September 2005.

The shooting began when the gunman entered the Prisma hypermarket and began firing with a 9×19mm handgun. He killed three men and one woman. The victims, aged 27, 40, 42 and 45, were employees of Prisma. Another woman, identified as the suspect's ex-girlfriend, was found dead in an Espoo apartment. The ex-girlfriend was also an employee of Prisma, and the Finnish police speculated that she was the main target, and that Shkupolli thought that her new partner worked at Prisma. The perpetrator, identified as 43-year-old Kosovar Albanian Ibrahim Shkupolli, was seen walking into another shop where he disappeared, sparking a major manhunt which involved police helicopters.

Later that day, Shkupolli was found dead in an apartment in Kirstinmäki, Espoo, in an apparent suicide. His apartment was completely empty except for a mattress, a framed photo of his ex-girlfriend, 14 fully loaded magazines for his gun, and a bag containing additional 273 cartridges. According to a neighbour who heard the gunshot, Shkupolli had shot himself at 11:13. The Finnish police evacuated and cordoned off the mall, and blocked off a nearby railway station. Emergency services arrived on the scene including dozens of ambulances and several fire engines.

The firearm used was a Czechoslovak-made 9mm CZ 75 pistol, manufactured in 1984 and was originally sold in Norway where the gun went missing due to an unsolved burglary case in 1990. The questions of how and when Shkupolli acquired it remain unknown. The first victim, the woman found in the apartment, was killed with a Smith & Wesson-branded hunting knife. The body had a long and deep incised wound reaching the cervical spine. The apartment had no signs of struggle.

== Shooter ==
Ibrahim Shkupolli

Ibrahim Shkupolli (1966 – 31 December 2009) was born in Mitrovica, Kosovo, worked as a grocer, and had resided illegally in Finland since 1990. He entered Finland through Norway in 1990. Shkupolli worked in a warehousing company that delivered to the Prisma supermarket chain.

Shkupolli had been married to a Kosovar Albanian woman with whom he had three children but maintained an on-off relationship with his Finnish girlfriend both before and after the marriage. In both of his former and present municipalities of residence, Mikkeli and Espoo, restraining orders had been imposed on him after his girlfriend filed charges about his behavior and numerous threats, including one to kill her. The order imposed by the court barred him from approaching both her and her job location. It is thought that he believed she had begun a relationship with one of the supermarket staff, and that this was the motive for his crimes. He had been convicted of assault in 2001 and possession of a 7.65 mm hand gun and associated rounds of ammunition in 2003 and 9 x 18 mm cartridges in 2007 as well as possession of narcotics. He was also under investigation for being involved in a human trafficking ring that organises illegal immigration from the Balkans to Finland.

These and other offenses including unlawful threats and traffic violations had led the Finnish Immigration Service to reject his application for Finnish citizenship. His motives may have been a mixture of a grudge with his former employer Prisma, and the fact that he believed that his girlfriend had started a new relationship with a Prisma employee after breaking up with Shkupolli.
