= Stepan Sarpaneva =

Finnish watchmaker

Stepan Sarpaneva (born February 1970 in Turku) is a Finnish watchmaker.

== Career ==
He enrolled in the Finnish School of Watchmaking (Kelloseppäkoulu) in 1989, earned his degree in watchmaking in 1992 and then went on to study at the Swiss Watchmakers of Switzerland Training and Education Program (WOSTEP).

In Switzerland since 1994, he has worked for several watch brands including Piaget, Parmigiani, Vianney Halter and Christophe Claret. At Parmigiani, he worked as the right-hand man for legendary Finnish watchmaker Kari Voutilainen

In 2003, he returned to Finland and founded a company called Sarpaneva Watches. at the old Cable Factory (Kaapelitehdas) in Helsinki, where he makes handcrafted wristwatches. The following year, he also founded S.U.F Helsinki (SarpanevaUhrenFabrik) to make and sell larger batches of more affordable watches. At first, 80% of his work was for Christophe Claret, but since 2007, he has been making his own watches full time

Sarpaneva Watches are known for their peculiar nouveau-Gothic designs. In contrast, the S.U.F Helsinki watches are inspired by Finnish landscapes, philosophies, legends, and pioneers of engineering, speed and design, such as the Finnish World War II fighter plane VL Myrsky, Finnish submarine Vetehinen, legendary motorcyclist Jarno “Paroni” Saarinen and the Finnish concept of Sisu.

Sarpaneva Watches are mainly made out of locally sourced steel, because according to Stepan, there aren't many colors in his world and instead, steel gets its beauty from various finishes, by polishing, sanding or brushing.

In 2009, Stepan Sarpaneva was awarded the Red Dot Design Award for his Korona K3 Black Moon moonphase watch and by the end of the same year, he was awarded two Good Design awards from the Chicago Athenaeum.

In 2018 and 2019, he got a lot of attention for creating an extremely precise moon phase calibre called Sarpaneva Moonment®, utilized in the Sarpaneva Lunations watch model. It only needs to be adjusted for a single day of error once every 14,000 years. It launched with a matching iPhone app to track the moon phases.

== Other ==
Stepan Sarpaneva's father was jewelry artist Pentti Sarpaneva and his uncle was industrial designer Timo Sarpaneva.
