= Laurea University of Applied Sciences =

Institute of higher education in Uusimaa, Finland

- Laurea-ammattikorkeakoulu
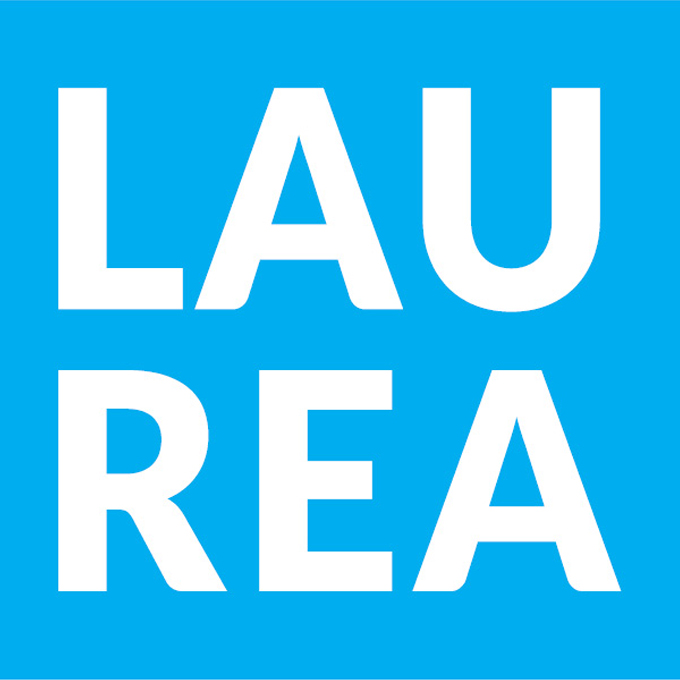
- Former names: Espoon–Vantaan ammattikorkeakoulu
- Type: University of applied sciences (polytechnic)
- Established: 1992
- President: Jouni Koski
- Students: 9,900
- Location: Hyvinkää, Espoo, Lohja, Porvoo and Vantaa, Uusimaa, Finland
- Campus: Hyvinkää, Leppävaara, Lohja, Otaniemi, Porvoo and Vantaa
- Website: www.laurea.fi

Laurea University of Applied Sciences (Finnish: Laurea-ammattikorkeakoulu) is a university of applied sciences that operates in the region of Uusimaa, in southern Finland. In 2024, it became a European University as part of the European Union's European Universities initiative.

== Campuses ==
Laurea has six campuses. Three of these campuses are located in the Helsinki Capital Region and the Greater Helsinki Metropolitan Area. Two campuses are situated in Otaniemi and Leppävaara in the City of Espoo, while the third is in Tikkurila in the City of Vantaa. Additionally, Laurea has three other campuses located in Hyvinkää, Lohja, and Porvoo.

The Otaniemi campus was relocating to Kivenlahti in Espoo. The new campus was scheduled to open in 2025. In 2025, Laurea decided to withdraw from the Kivelahti Campus project due to delays in the metro center development project led by SRV. Laurea also decided to shut down the Otaniemi Campus and concentrate on developing the Leppävaara Campus in Espoo.

Laurea University of Applied Sciences has approximately 9,900 students and employs around 660 staff members. In 2022, it was ranked as the 10th most popular university in Finland among applicants, with the lowest acceptance rate, making it particularly challenging to secure a place at the university.

== Degrees ==
Laurea offers bachelor's and master's degrees in both English and Finnish. In 2024, Laurea provided degrees in the following fields: Business Information Technology and Developing Services, Business Information Technology and Cyber Security, Business Management, Safety, Security, and Risk Management, Nursing, Social Services, Hospitality Management and Service Design, Service Innovation and Design, Global Health and Crisis Management, and Leading Transformational Change.

Education at the Laurea University of Applied Sciences is based on the Learning by Developing (LbD) pedagogical model.

Laurea has an exchange student program, and an Open University.

== Acceptance rate ==
Laurea University of Applied Sciences typically accepts the lowest percentage of applicants among all universities and higher education institutions in Finland. In 2020, out of 15,700 applicants, only 1,160, or 7%, were admitted.

== Student associations ==
Laureamko is the student union of the university, dedicated to promoting student rights, high-quality education, and student well-being.

Laurea Entrepreneurship Society promotes entrepreneurship among students at the university. Since 2007, the university and the Laurea Entrepreneurship Society have organized the Cambridge Venture Camp in Cambridge, United Kingdom. Anglia Ruskin University serves as a key strategic partner for this initiative.

== Alumni ==
Laurea has two alumni groups: the Alumni Delegation, which consists of 100 members, and the Alumni Advisory Group, which supports the development of Laurea and has 20 members.

In 2022, 34,700 students graduated from Laurea.

== Research ==
Laurea engages in research, development, and innovation across several areas, including entrepreneurship, pedagogy and co-creation, as well as digitalization and information management.

== University partnerships ==
Laurea UAS is an active member of the University of the Arctic. UArctic is an international cooperative network based in the Circumpolar Arctic region, consisting of more than 200 universities, colleges, and other organizations with an interest in promoting education and research in the Arctic region.

The university participates in UArctic's mobility program north2north. The aim of that program is to enable students of member institutions to study in different parts of the North.

Laurea has higher education partners in Europe, Asia, North America, South America, and Africa. A significant number of these partners are located within the European Union.

In 2024, university partners were University of Gothenburg, University of Copenhagen, London College of Fashion, Coventry University, Cardiff Metropolitan University, University of Salford, Leeds Beckett University, University of Hull, Queen Margaret University, University of the West of Scotland, De Montfort University, Robert Gordon University, Hogeschool van Amsterdam, EPHEC Business School, ISC Paris - School of Management, ESCE École Supérieure du Commerce Extérieur, Université de Montpellier, Université de Savoie, University of Torino, University of Firenze, University of Calabria, Universidad de Malaga, University of Valencia, Universidad Europea de Madrid, St. Petersburg University of Management and Economics, Saint Petersburg State University of Engineering and Economics, St. Petersburg State University of Information Technologies, Plekhanov Russian University of Economics, FHS St. Gallen University of Applied Sciences, Bern University of Applied Sciences, FH Campus Wien University of Applied Sciences, Technological Educational Institution of Athens, Kocaeli University, Eskisehir Osmangazi University, National Institute of Technology Hamirpur, President University, National Taiwan University, Shanghai Jiaotong University, Konkuk University, Aoyama Gakuin University, Saitaman University, University Of Johannesburg, University of Namibia, University of São Paulo, UDESC - Universidade do Estado de Santa Catarina, Tecnológico de Monterrey, University of the West Indies Cave Hill Campus, Nazareth College of Rochester, and many others.

== International Advisory Board ==
Laurea has an International Advisory Board that consists of 5 to 10 members. Past and present members are from Gustave Eiffel University, The Hague University of Applied Sciences, the University of the Bundeswehr Munich, the Higher Colleges of Technology, Estonian Business School, and the University of Cambridge.

== Partners ==
Laurea's past and present key partners are Apotti, Assembly, Attendo, Barona, Bookers, Bonne, Caverion, Colliers Finland, Coor, CSC, Dieta, Digia, Ekerö Line, Eduix, Efecte, Elis, Elo, Go Strong, Hedengren Security, Helsinki Senior Foundation, HKScan, Hoivatilat, Hoiwa, Humana, Citymarket Järvenpää, Kaarikeskus, Kalatukku E. Eriksson, Kespro, Kolster, Lindström, Microsoft, Nokia, Nordic Beauty Import, OP Uusimaa, PwC Finland, Ramirent, RTV, SATO, Sector Alarm, SOL palvelut, Staffpoint, STARK, Terveystalo, Trainers' House, Transmeri, Varma, Vincit, YIT and Yliopiston Apteekki.

== History ==
Laurea was established in 1992 under the name Espoo-Vantaa Polytechnic, which was later changed to its current name in 2001. In 2025, Laurea joined the European University Association (EUA).

== Gallery ==
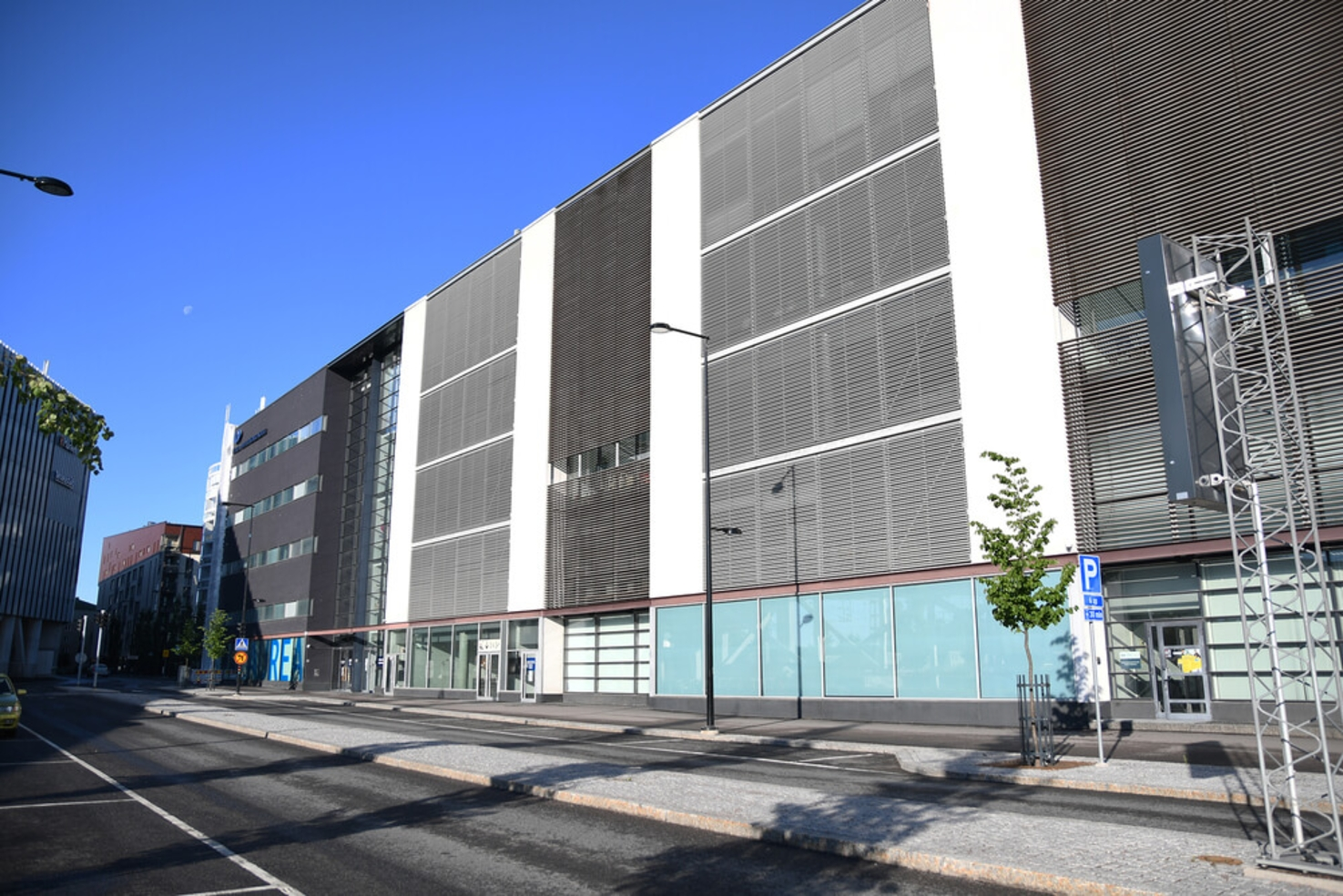
Laurea University of Applied Sciences Tikkurila Campus in Vantaa, Finland.

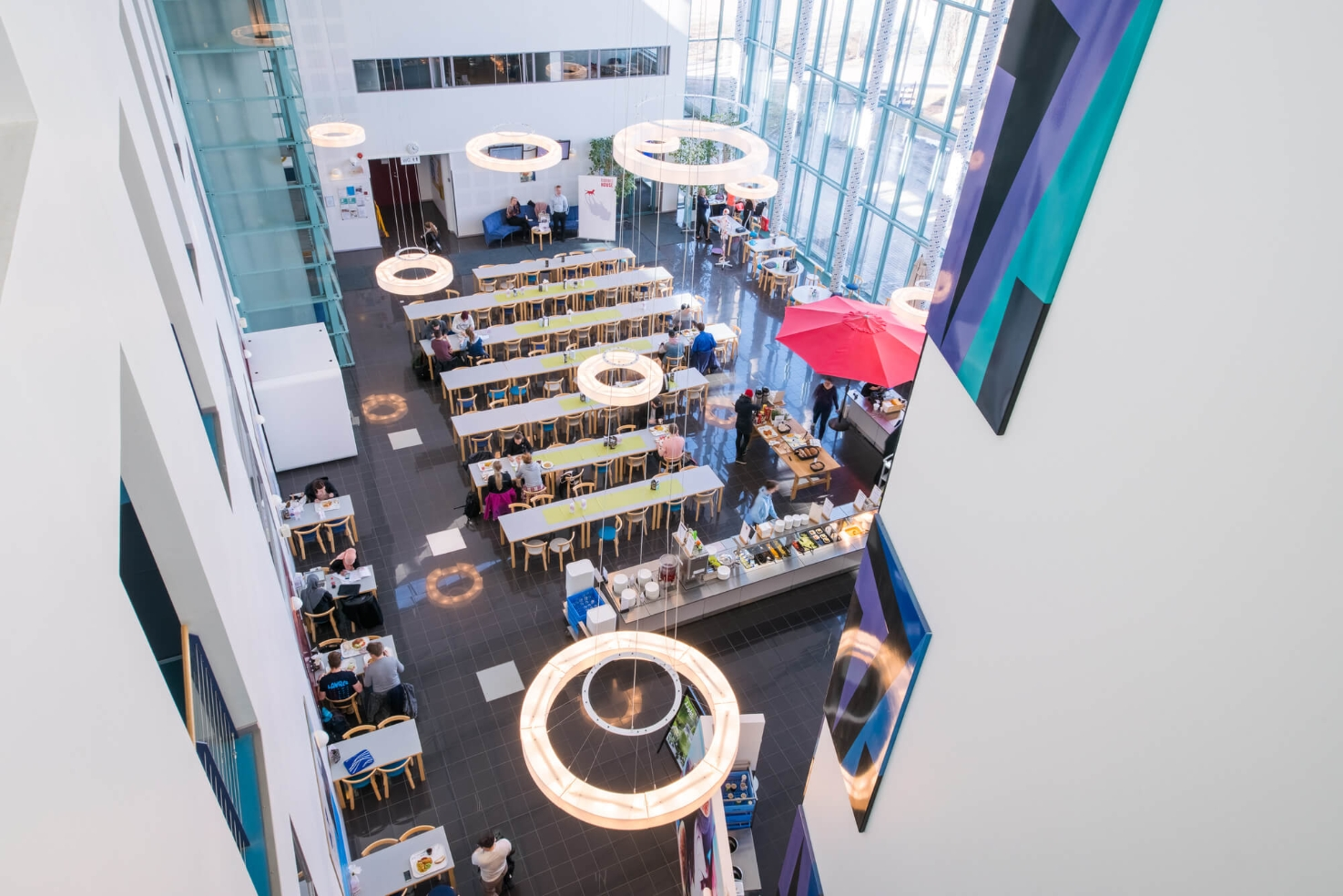
Laurea University of Applied Sciences Otaniemi Campus in Finland.

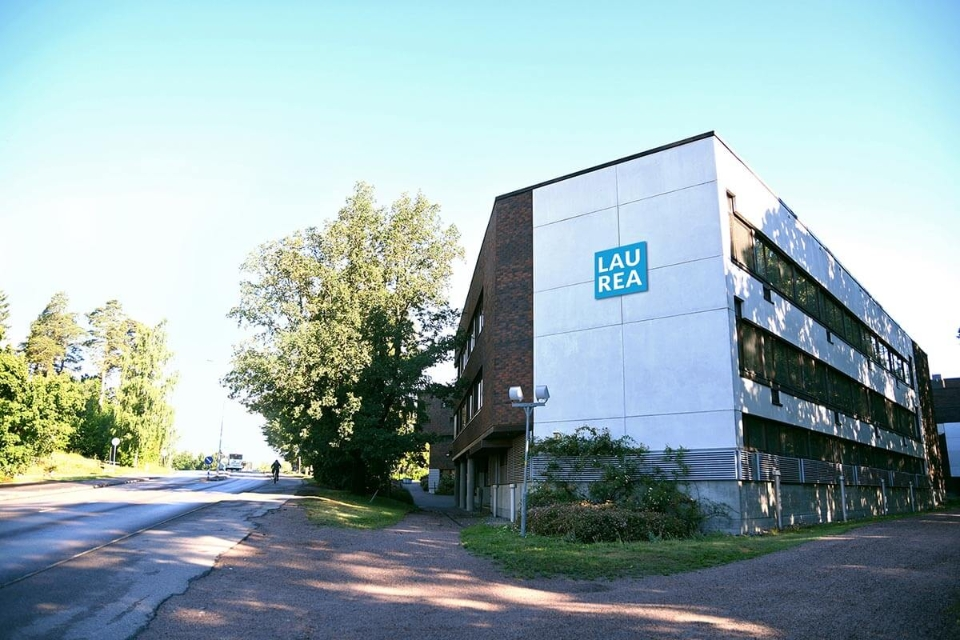
Laurea University of Applied Sciences Leppävaara Campus in Finland.

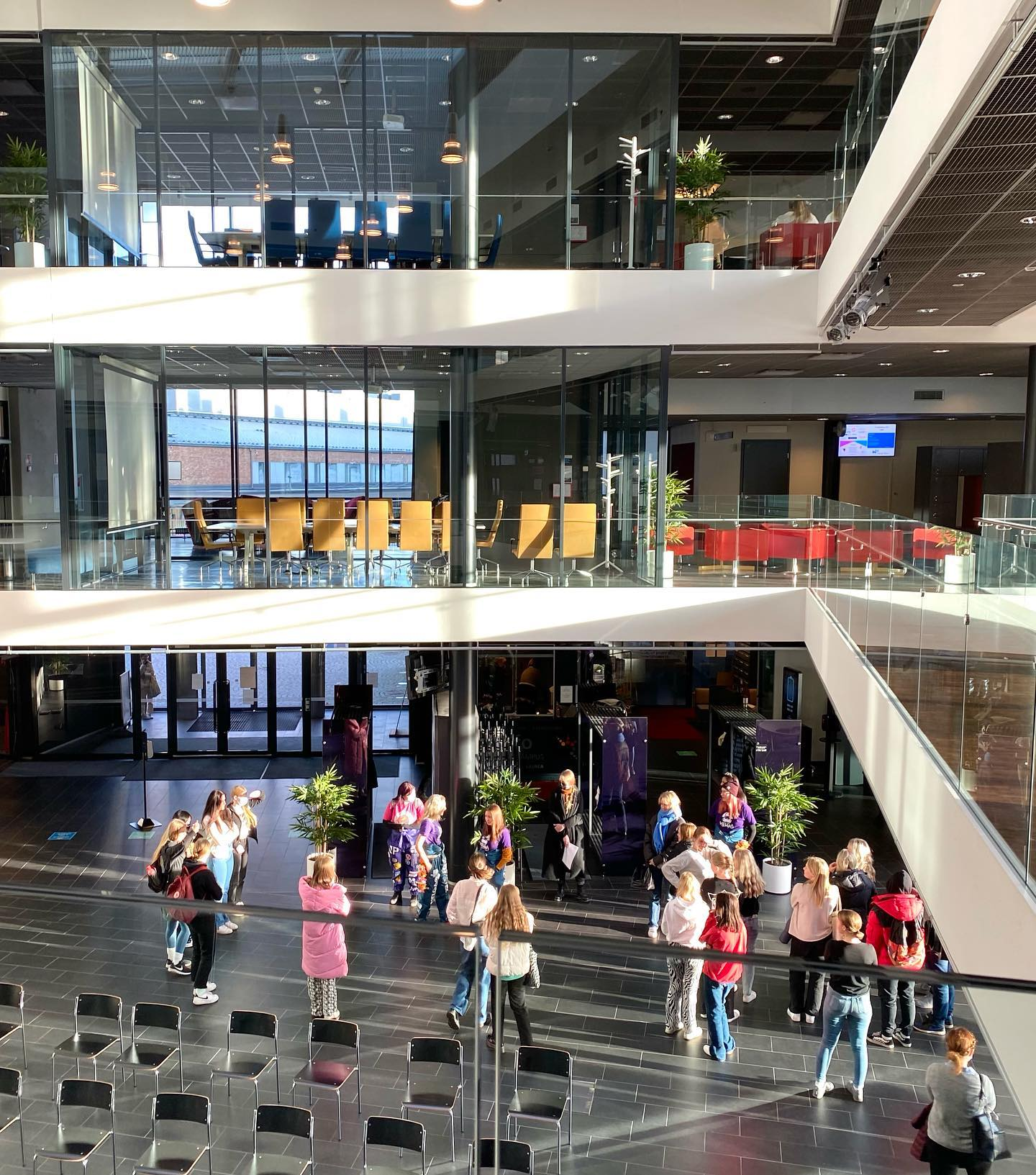
Laurea University of Applied Sciences Porvoo Campus in Finland.

== See also ==
- Laurea University of Applied Sciences: https://www.laurea.fi/en/
- Facebook: https://www.facebook.com/LaureaUAS
- LinkedIn: https://www.linkedin.com/school/laurea-university-of-applied-sciences/
- Twitter: https://twitter.com/laureauas
- YouTube: https://www.youtube.com/@LaureaUAS
- Instagram: https://www.instagram.com/laureauas/
- Student story: Manju Pandey Neaupane (nursing): https://www.youtube.com/watch?v=81hdQLo0DQc&t=122s
- Student story: Leenet Kamel (hospitality management and service design: https://www.youtube.com/watch?v=oiM-zm98Zps
- Laurea - Find Your Way With Us: https://www.youtube.com/watch?v=iHZL9VMkO_Q
