= Finnish School of Watchmaking =

Vocational school in Espoo, Finland

- Finnish: Kelloseppäkoulu
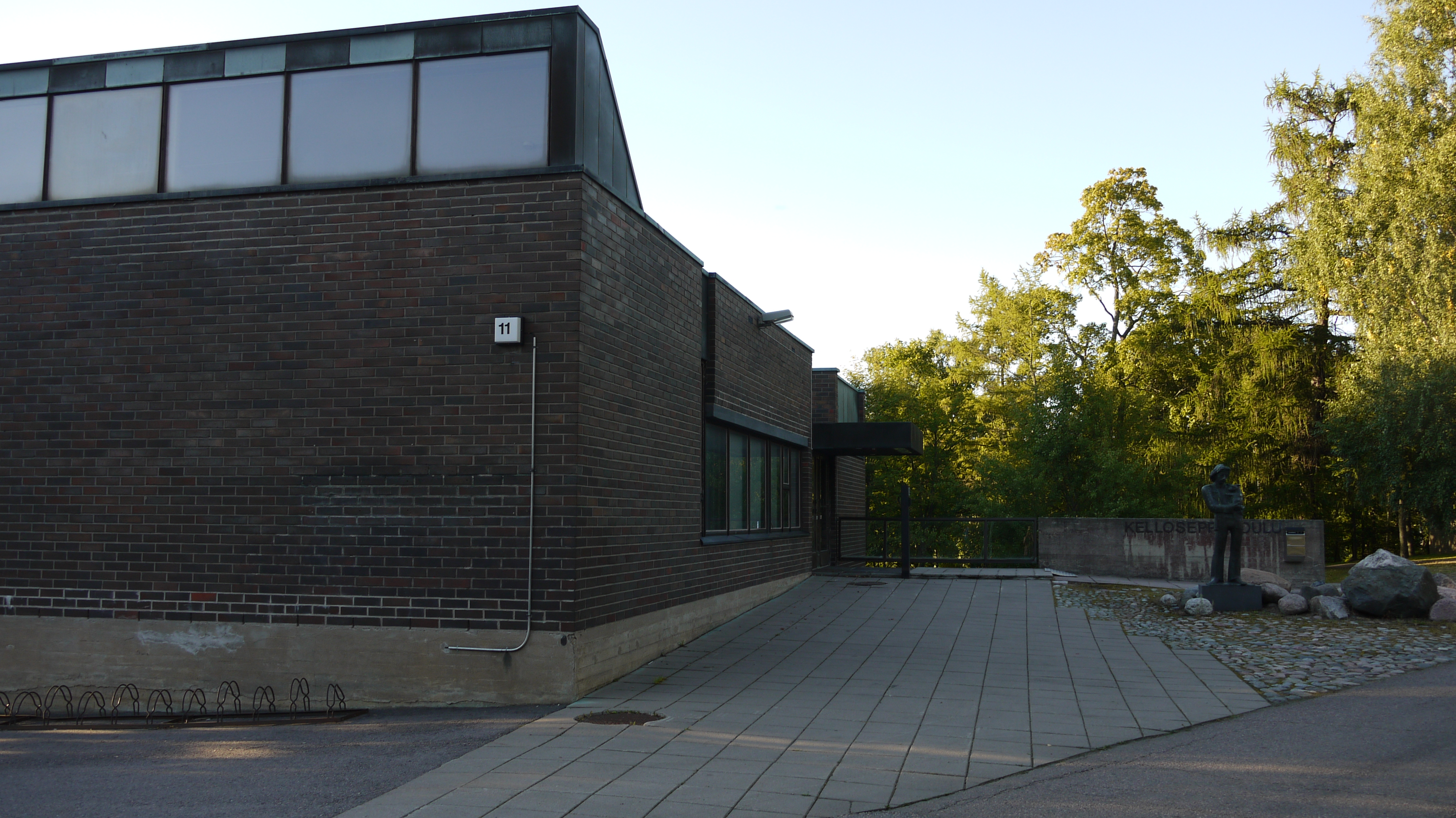

Information
- Established: 1944; 82 years ago
- School board: Finland's Foundation for the Advancement of Watchmaking Skills; Finnish: Kellosepäntaidon Edistämissäätiö

The Finnish School of Watchmaking (Finnish: Kelloseppäkoulu) is a watchmaking school based in Espoo, Finland. The school was founded in Lahti in 1944, and moved to Espoo in 1957.

The school offers two three-year degree programmes, Watchmaking and Micro-Mechanics. The school is overseen by the Kellosepäntaidon Edistämissäätiö (Finland's Foundation for the Advancement of Watchmaking Skills).

The alumni of the school include watchmakers Kari Voutilainen and Stepan Sarpaneva.
