= Postipuu School =

- Postipuun koulu
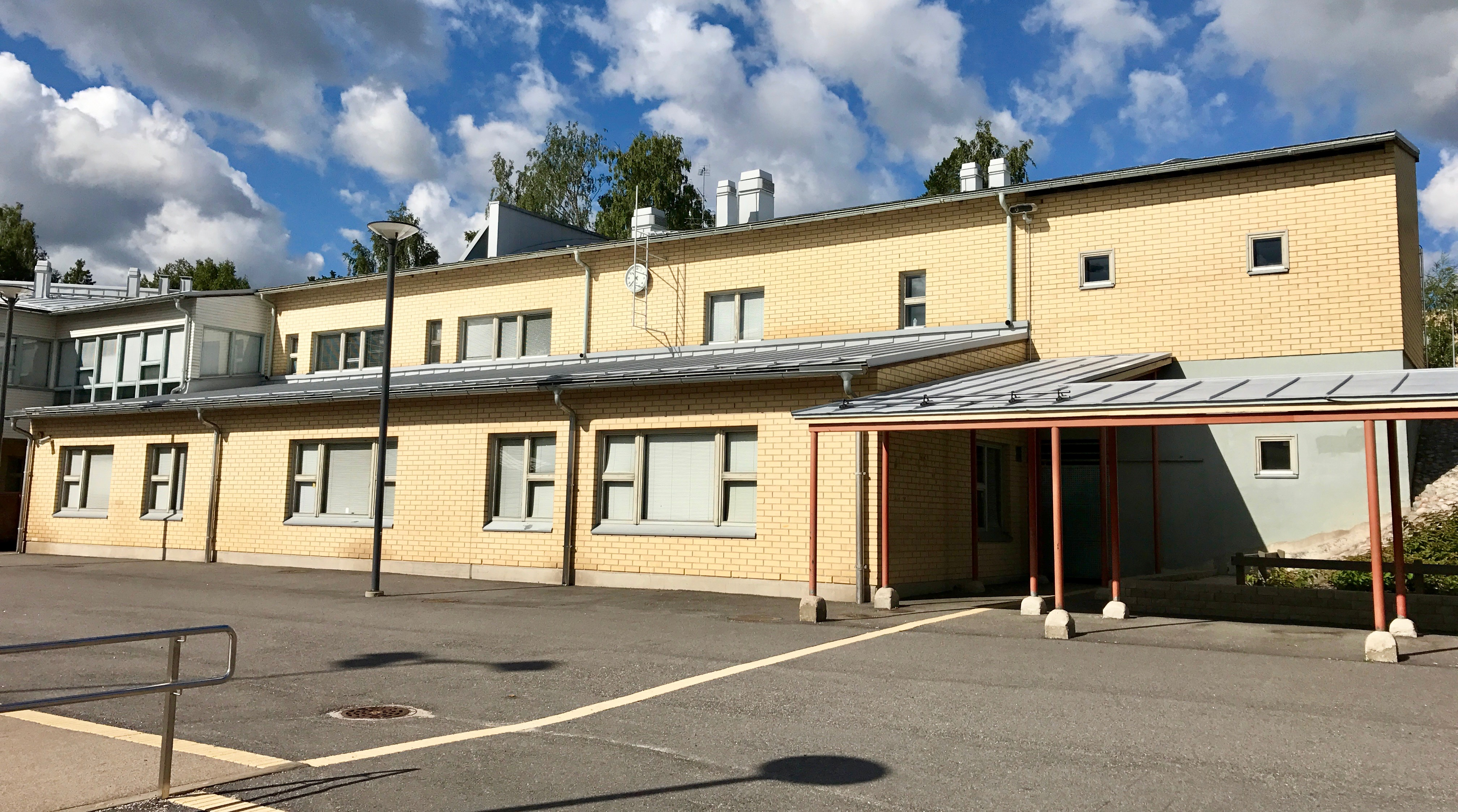

Location
- Ruutikuja 2 Espoo, Southern Finland; Finland
- Coordinates: 60°13′24.01″N 24°49′30.01″E

Information
- Established: 1992
- Principal: Ilpo Salonen
- Staff: 60
- Grades: 1–6
- Average class size: 27

Postipuu School is a primary school in Espoo, Finland. It consists of pre-school, primary and secondary school level. There are around 300 pupils and 60 staff members at Postipuu. The pupils represent many different nationalities, as do the staff members. Since 2016, the school principal has been Anne Suomala. The school offers lessons in both Finnish and English. Along with this, French and Finnish as a second language are offered to students.
