= Panorama Tower (Espoo) =

Building in Leppävaara, Espoo, Finland

Coordinates: 60°13′6.6″N 24°48′51.84″E

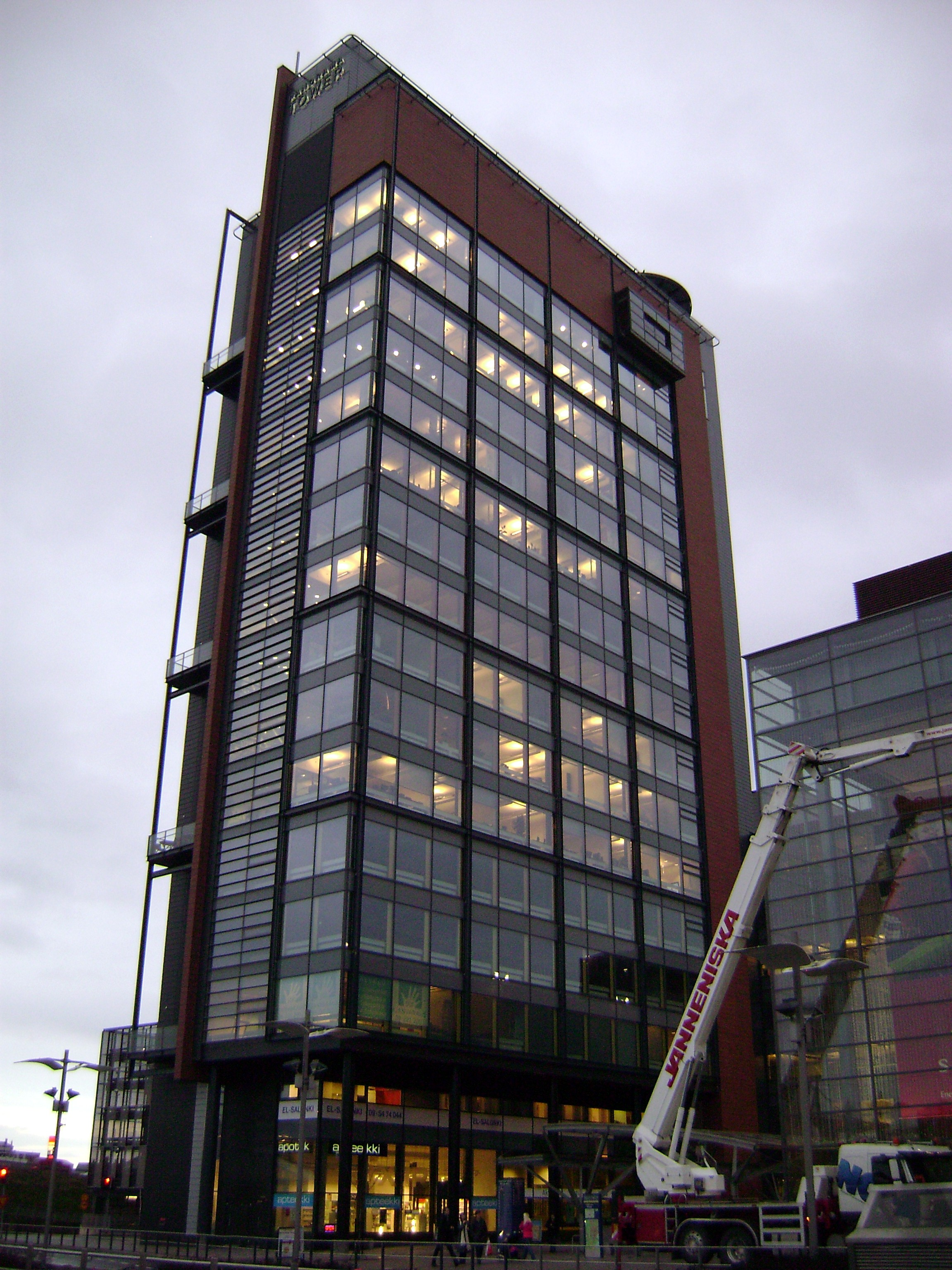
The Panorama Tower in November 2008.

The Panorama Tower (previously known as Signaali Headquarters) is a high-rise building in Leppävaara, Espoo, Finland located at Hevosenkenkä 3. It is the third highest building in Espoo. The building is a three-sided office building with the sides attached to each other. Of the three sides, two have seven floors and one has seventeen floors.

== Overview ==
The building is owned by the insurance company Varma and has been designed by the architect bureau Larkas & Laine. The total area of the building is 23,600 square metres, of which 16,100 square metres is office space and 1600 square metres is business space. The C building has an area of 4000 square metres, the B building has 3900 and the A building has 8200. Business spaces for rent range from 100 to 1850 square metres. The total volume of the building is 90 thousand cubic metres. The office spaces have been designed so that they can be used as cubicles, open offices or a hybrid, depending on the wishes of the client. Also 550 square metres on each office floor can be split between two clients when necessary.

The B and C buildings have eight floors and are 42 metres high. The A building has seventeen floors and is 73 metres high. The street level and the three first floors of the tower building A have been reserved for businesses and services. Floors 4 to 16 are office spaces. The top floor has a sauna rentable for corporate events and an engineering space. The 17th floor is only a small stairs compartment with a helicopter hovering space on top of it. The floor is built to look like a fully usable office space. Beneath the building is a 1200 square metre basement with social and storage spaces.

The parking spaces for the Panorama Tower are located in a parking hall next to the building, with 480 covered parking spaces.

== Construction ==
The main structure designer Pöyry created a 3D virtual building from the basic structures of the building, which was the foundation for the whole structure design. The first sketches of the tower were made in December 2003, but the project was on hold for a year after this. A construction decision was made in spring 2006.

Construction started in April 2006. The joint company "Tyl Leppävaara" between Skanska and NCC constructed the Panorama Tower for the insurance company Varma. The total cost of the building was about 54 million euro.

Because of the cost of steel and the fire safety requirements for the building, the main structure material chosen for the 3D model was concrete, which was later changed to steel. The pillar structure of the building is made of steel, the supporting structure is made of concrete and the light facades are mainly made of glass. The steel pillar structure supports its own weight as well as the total weight of the building. The facades are made of Ruukki facade elements, which use either Liberta surface or brick paving on the outer surface, or of glass-aluminium wall elements.

=== Foundation ===
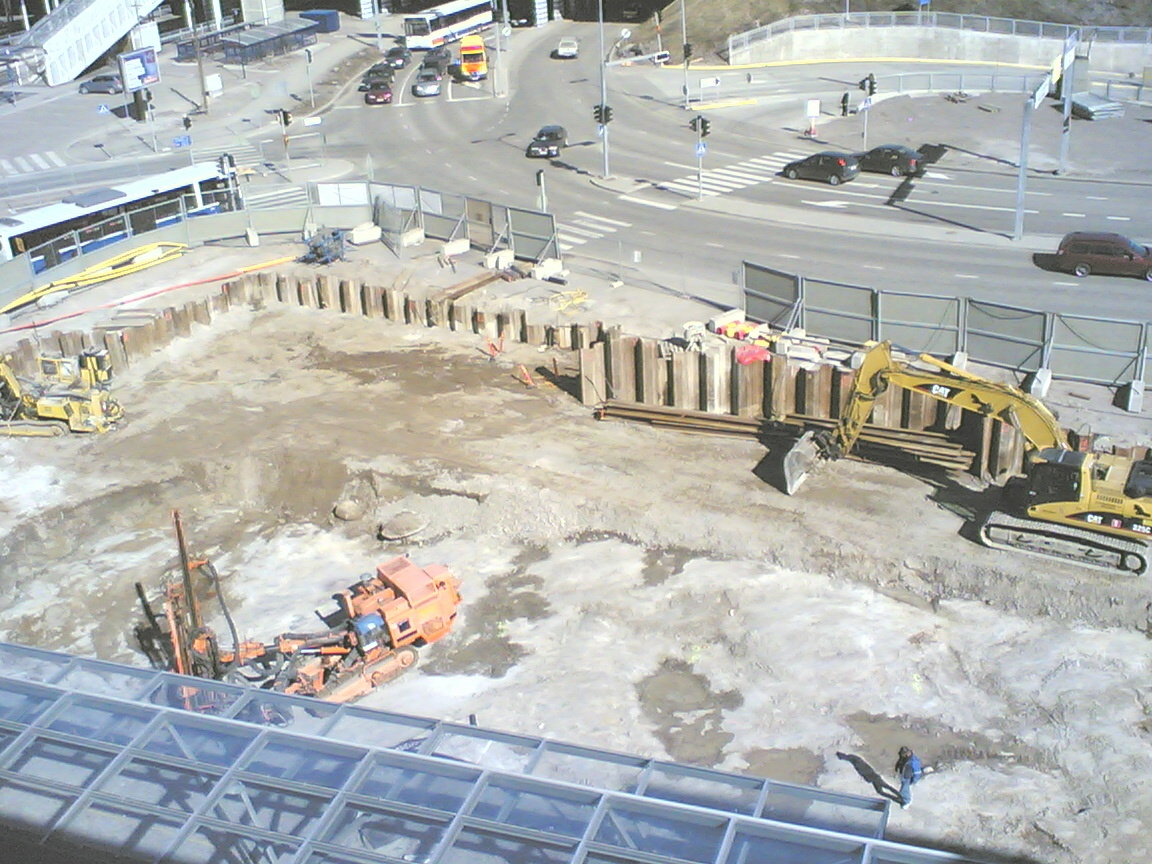
Construction of the Panorama Tower in April 2006.

The rock underneath the tower is very fragmented and so the steel anchor bars had to be anchored at a depth of 15 metres instead of the planned six metres. Traction bars 40 millimetres in diameter have been inserted into the rock and tensed with a strength of 80 tonnes.

There is a tunnel from beneath the C building to the parking garage of the Sello shopping centre, and so there is no basement beneath the C building. The Sello service tunnel also runs beneath the building. There had been structures planned into the tunnel during construction to allow building on top of them. There are wider spaces between the pillars in the building at the tunnel than there are elsewhere, up to the top of the building.

=== Framework ===
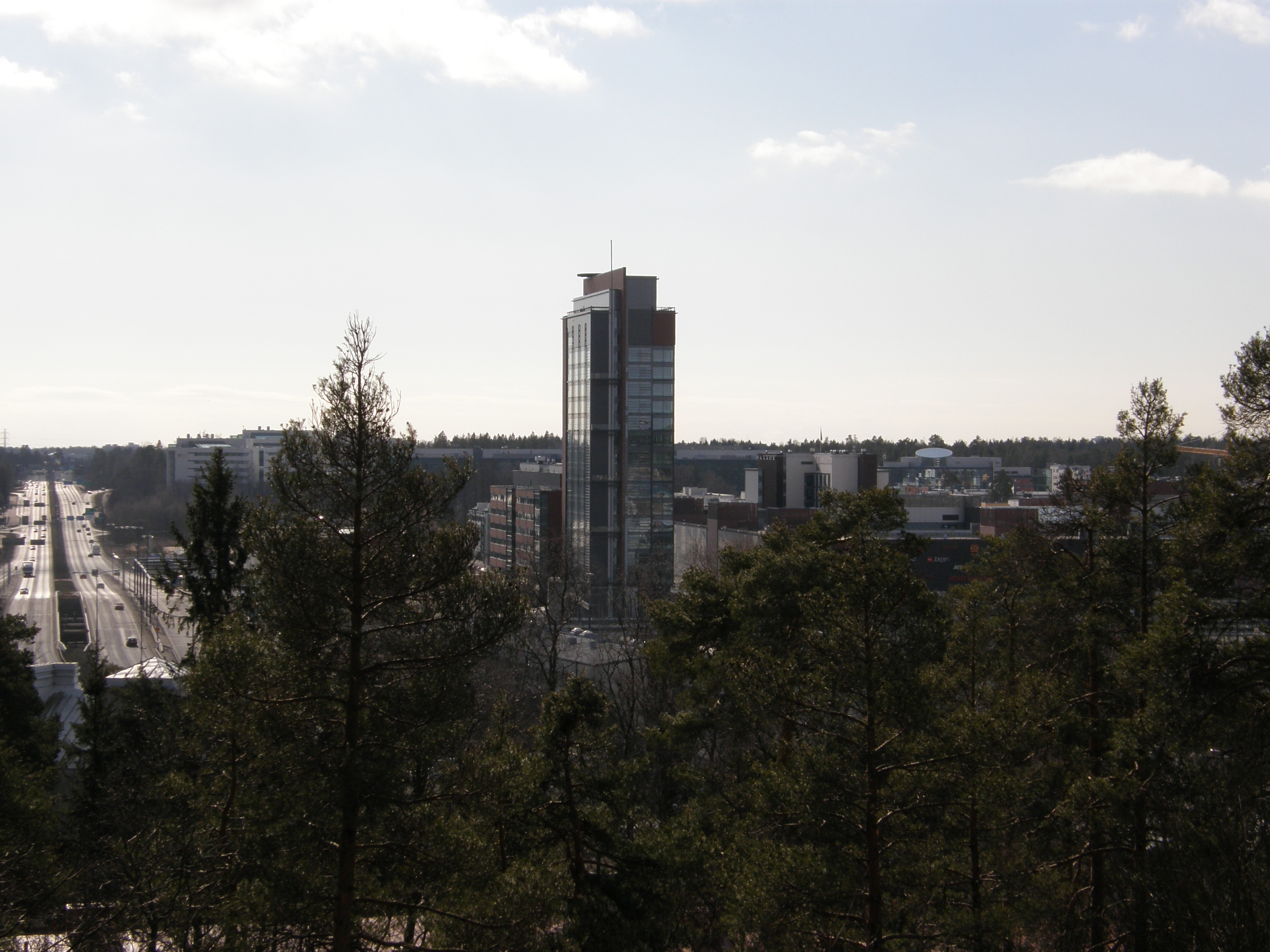
The Panorama Tower in March 2008. To the left is the Ring I beltway.

The framework of the building has been assembled with tower cranes, the facade partly with mobile cranes. Because of the mobile cranes and the tightness of the lot one side of the facade was assembled three to four floors at a time. Two tower cranes were used in the construction with one of them being over 90 metres high and having a beam 55 metres long. Because of the height of the crane, a special no-flight permit had from the aviation bureau had to be acquired for it.

The supporting walls were cast in place and are vertically tensed structure. Wall elements have been used in the tower after the eighth floor.

A speciality of the facade is that they are lit with colour-changing LEDs.

=== Elevators ===
The stairs and elevators of the building were cast in place up to the ninth floor and tensed into the rock afterwards. The elevators are KONE MonoSpace elevators without machinery rooms, with a speed of 2.5 metres per second. The elevators with windows are fit with cooling, which is rare in Finland. One of the elevators is designed so that firemen can use it in case of fire.

The Panorama Tower was completed in April 2008.
