= Rantaraitti =

Hiking route along the coast of Espoo, Finland

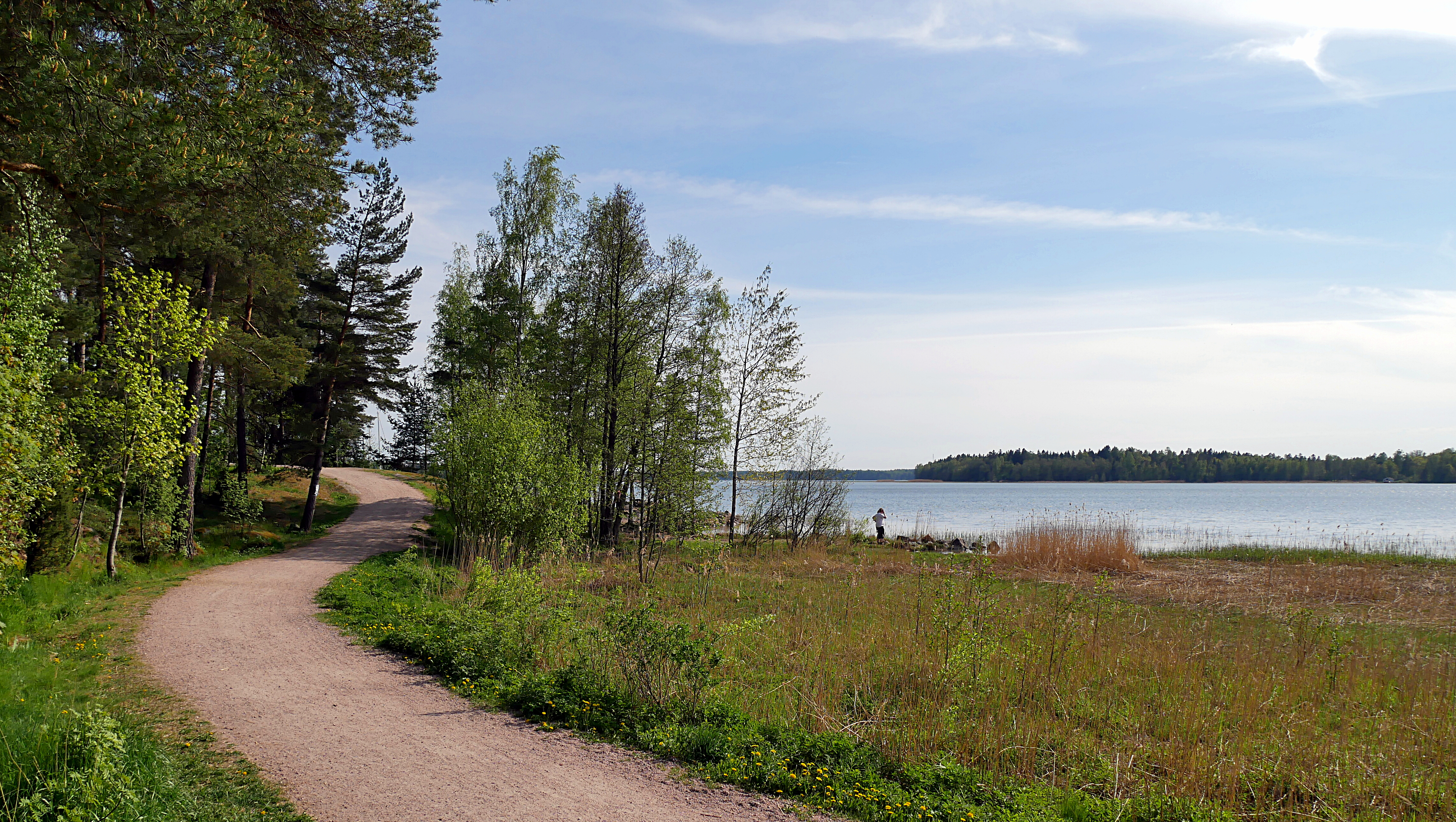
- A view of Rantaraitti in Espoonlahti, Espoo.
- Length: 27 km (17 mi)
- Location: Espoo, Finland
- Trailheads: Laajalahti; 60°12′18.6″N 24°50′31.0″E; Saunalahti; 60°09′43.9″N 24°35′37.0″E
- Use: Hiking
- Difficulty: Easy
- Season: Spring, summer, autumn
- Months: March to September
- Surface: Mostly natural or sand, some parts paved with asphalt
- Right of way: The trail does not cross any motorways or railroads
- Maintainer: City of Espoo
- Website: http://espoo.fi/rantaraitti

The Espoo Waterfront Walkway (rantaraitti in Finnish) or strandpromenaden (Swedish) is an urban, gravel walking, hiking and cycling route along the coastline of Espoo, Finland, bordering the Gulf of Finland. The approximate total length of the route is 40 km.

Most of the route goes very near the coastline. At some places, it has to divert inland to public roads, because the coast is inaccessible or private property. The rantaraitti route starts at Laajalahti, near the border to Helsinki and then continues through the districts of Laajalahti, Otaniemi, Tapiola, Westend, Haukilahti, Matinkylä, Nuottaniemi, Kaitaa, Soukka and Espoonlahti to Saunalahti, near the border to Kirkkonummi.

From 1 May to 30 September 2008, the city of Espoo organised an event called rantaraittipatikointi ("rantaraitti hike") to celebrate the city's 550th anniversary. The event included people to hike through all or part of the rantaraitti route. There are twelve coastside cafés along the route that serve as marking points. In each of them, a participant could punch a stamp through the bottom edge of a specific leaflet called the "rantaraittipassi". A completed leaflet could then be sent to the city of Espoo to receive prizes.

There is an intention to continue the Rantaraitti trail for about ten kilometres, once the zoning plan of the area is completed. There are about one hundred spots about nature, cultural history, and about residential life in the past along the trail.

Rantaraitti received an honorary mention in the annual awards ceremony by the Finnish municipal technology organisation SKTY.

== Rantaraitti from west to east ==
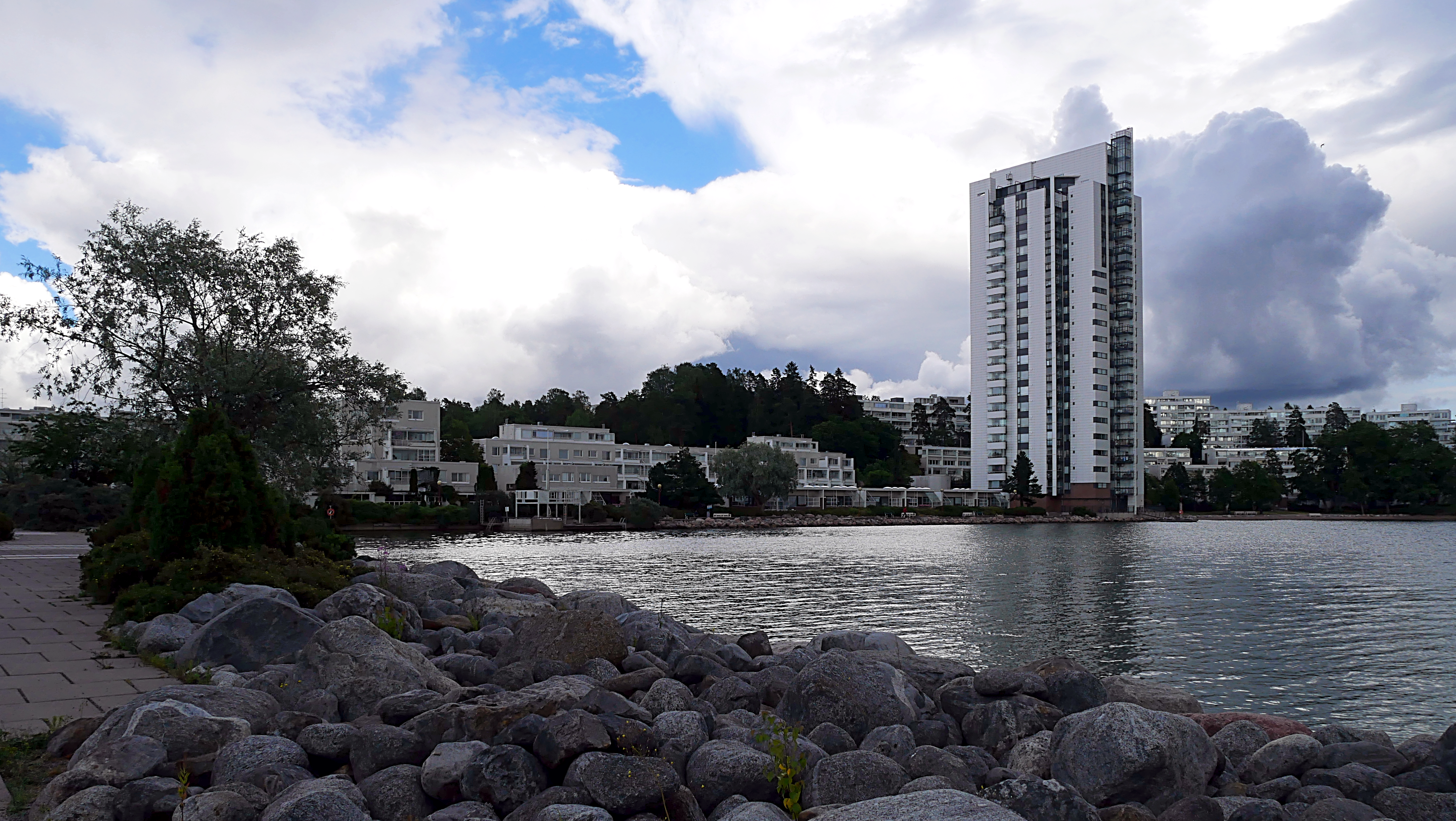
In Meri-Kivenlahti Rantaraitti goes on concrete slabs and occasionally makes 90-degree turns.

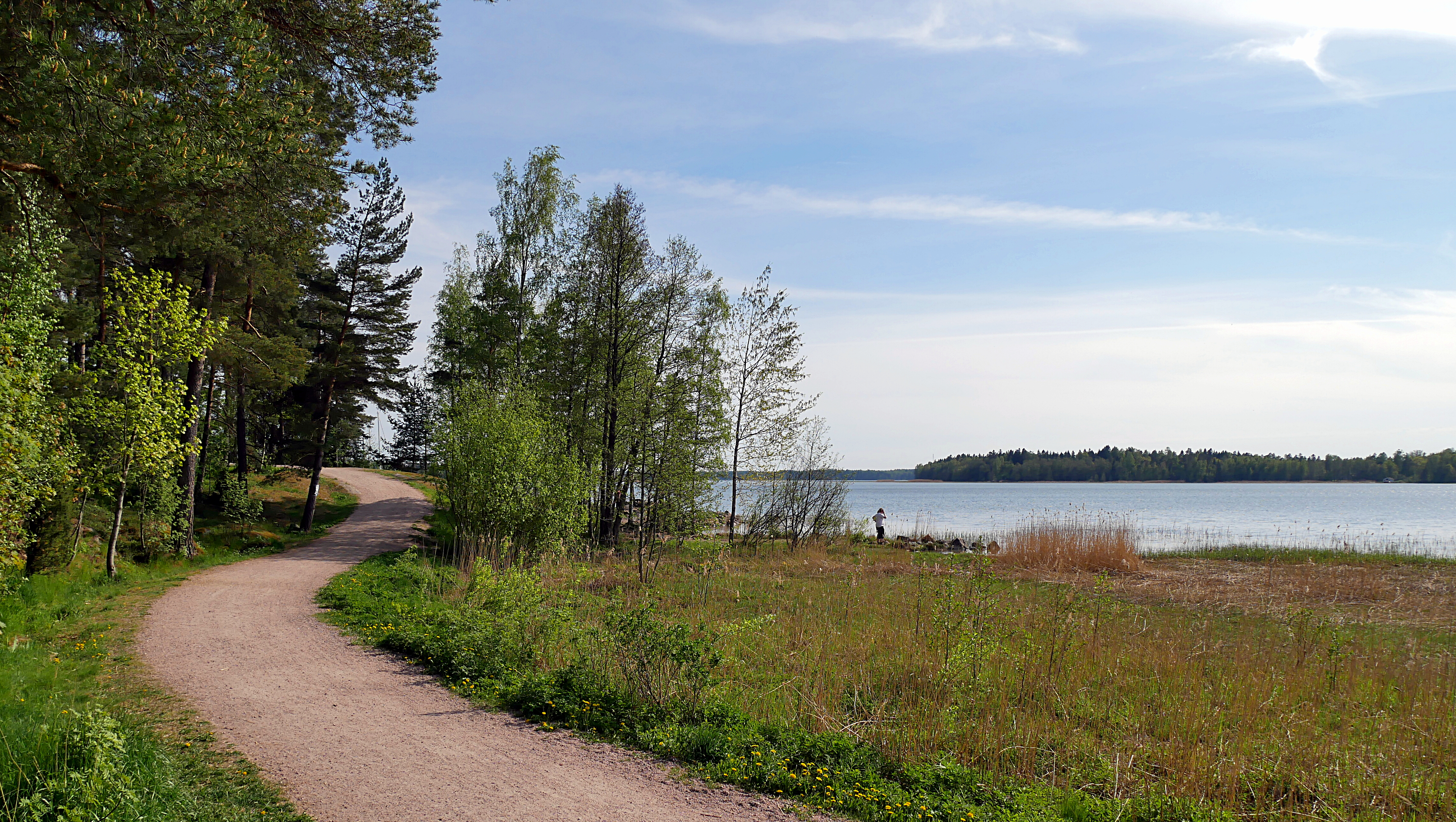
Slightly to the south the trail goes on gravel-paved beach.

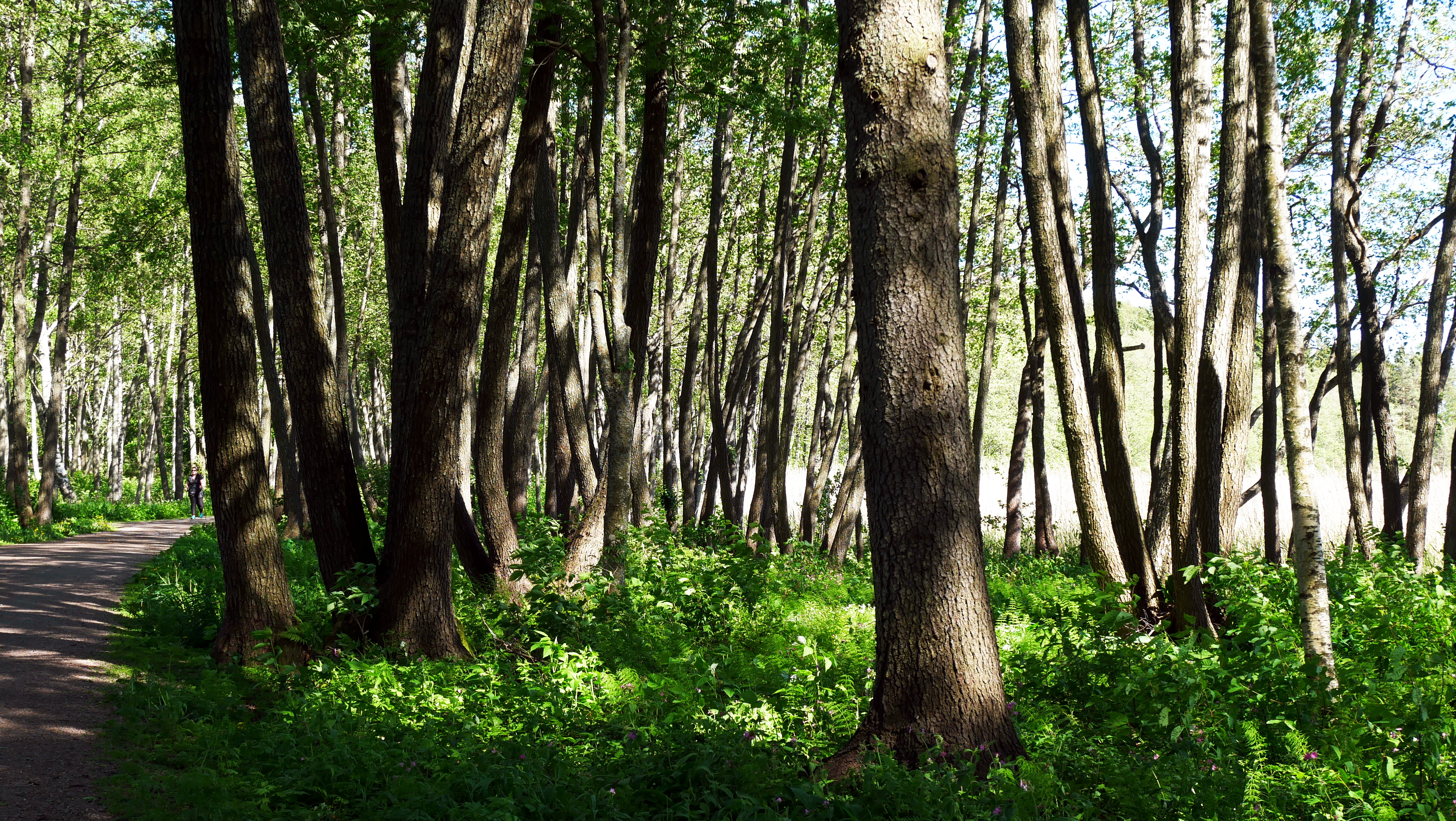
In Soukka, the trail goes mostly on streets; from Riihilahdentie in Kaitaa it returns to the beach. Shown here is a beach forest in Kaitaa.

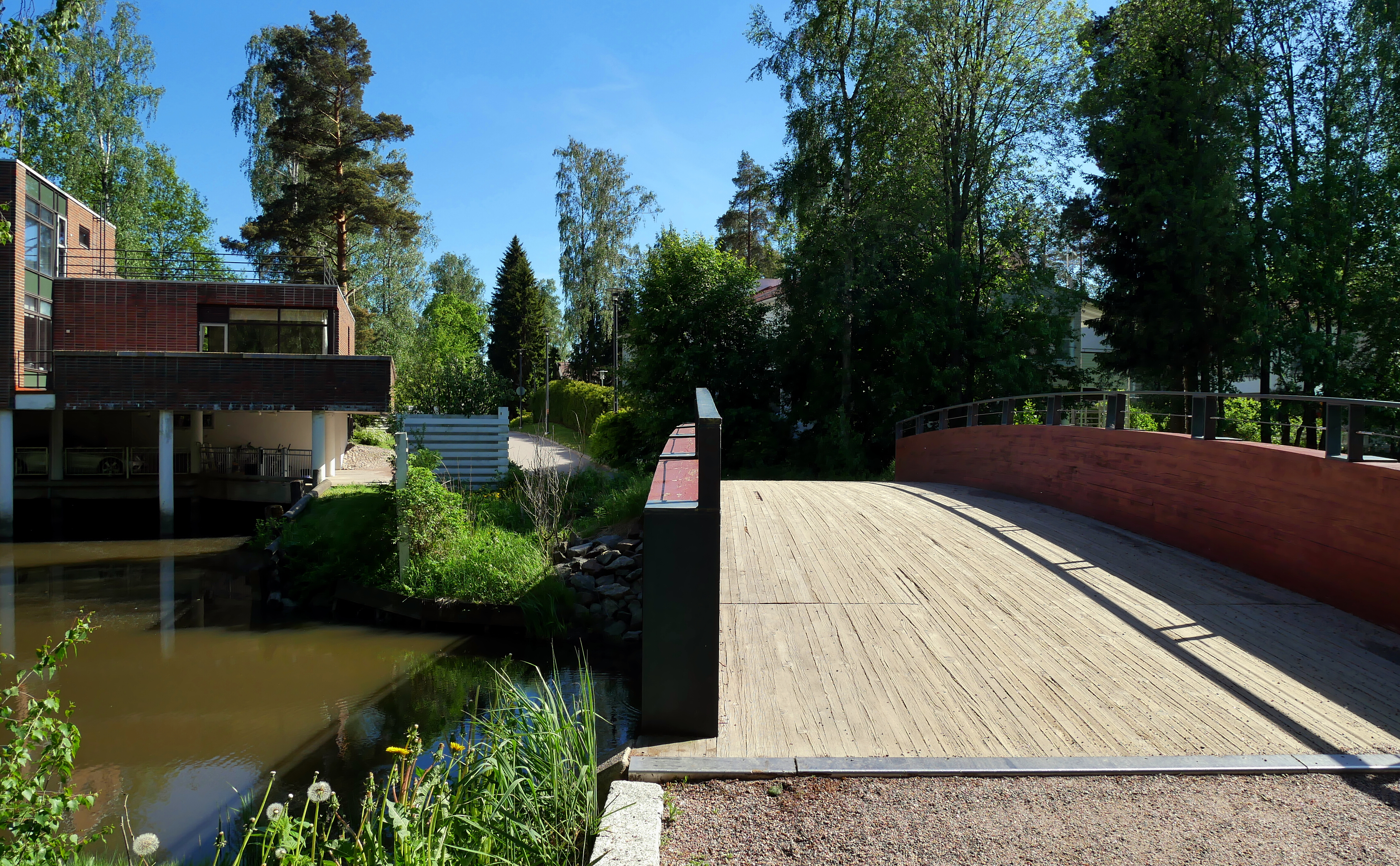
In Matinkylä the trail makes a detour to inland. A view to the east.

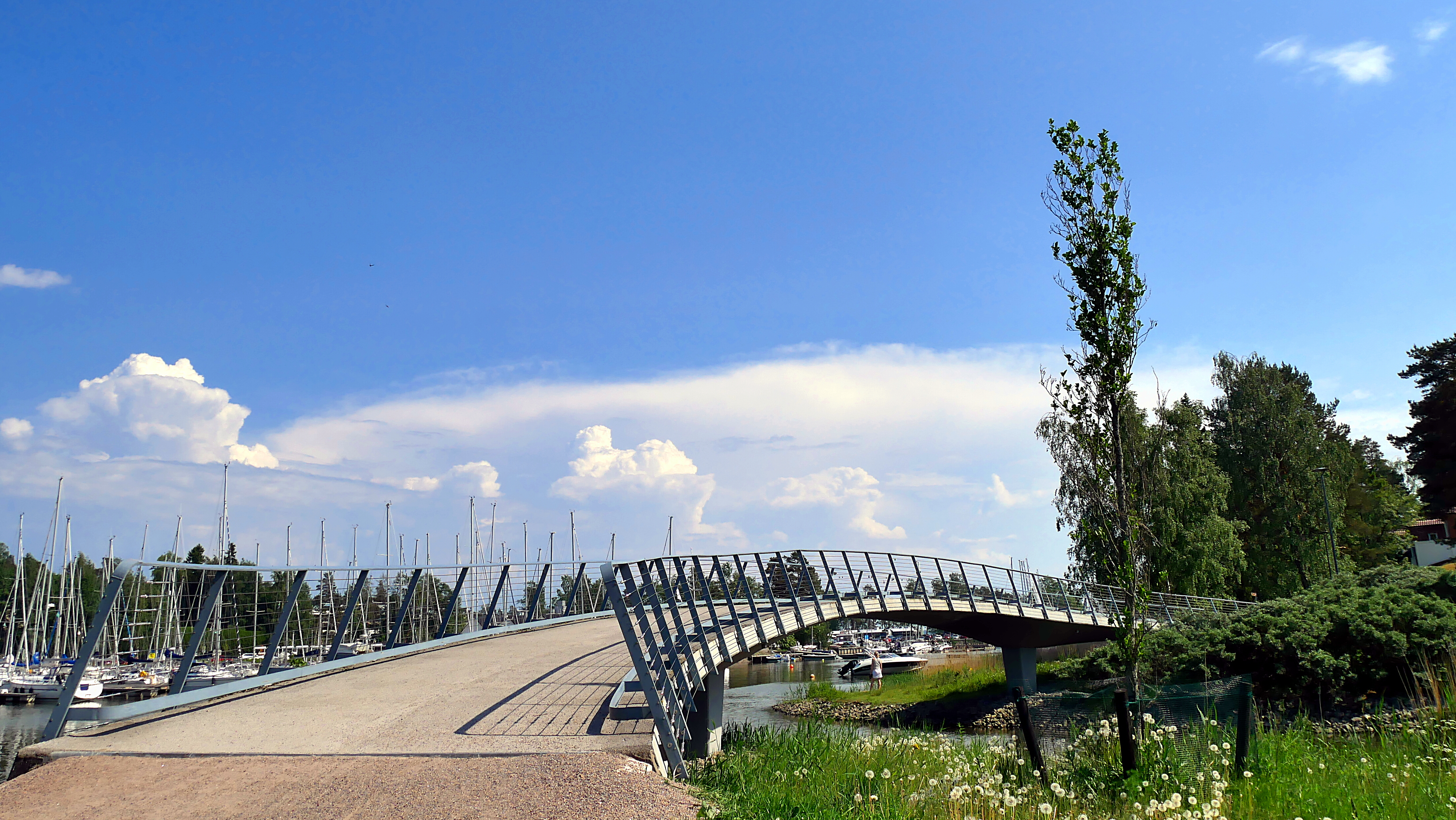
The trail connects to the Haukilahti boat harbour, where it continues to the east towards Westend.

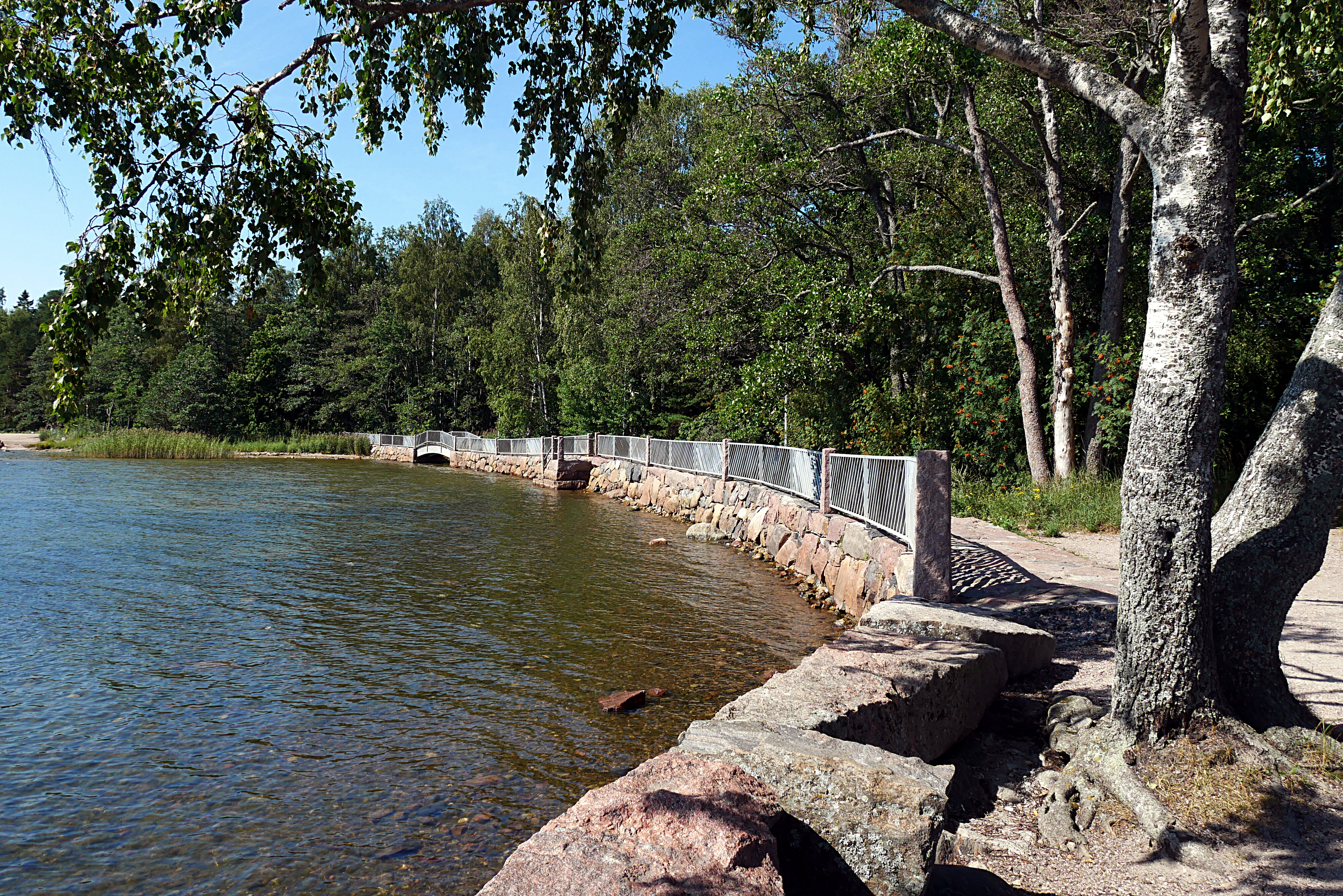
In Westend the trail does not always follow the beach, but there are several opportunities to visit the beach with usable alternative routes.
