= Saunalahti, Espoo =

Saunalahti Bastvik
- District of Espoo
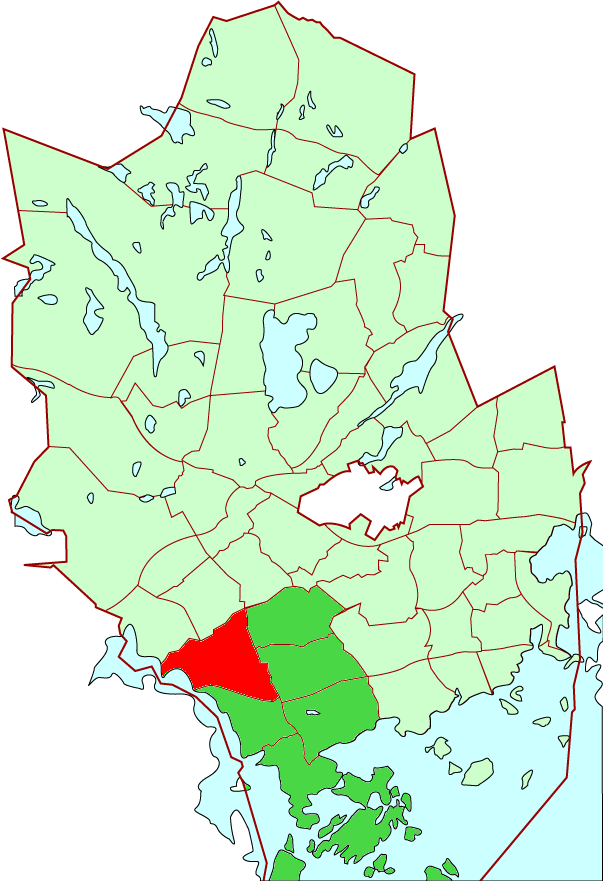
- Location of Saunalahti within Espoo
- Coordinates: 60°09′49″N 24°36′52″E
- Country: Finland
- Municipality: Espoo
- Region: Uusimaa
- Sub-region: Greater Helsinki
- Main District: Suur-Espoonlahti
- Inner District(s): Kattilalaakso, Kattilavuori, Kiviruukki, Kummeliranta, Kummelivuori, Sammalvuori, Tillinmäki

Population (2006)
  - Total: 3,270

Languages
  - Finnish: 86.2 %
  - Swedish: 11.1 %
  - Other: 2.7 %
- Jobs: 1,402

Saunalahti (Finnish) or Bastvik (Swedish) is one of the newest apartment building districts in Espoo, Finland, located by the Kummelivuori hill between Kivenlahti and Kurttila, west of the Kauklahdenväylä road, on the coast of the Espoonlahti bay. The bay at Saunalahti is named Bastvikfjärden. The area also contains original detached house residence from old Saunalahti and agriculture. Saunalahti is separated from Kivenlahti by the Länsiväylä highway, continuing to Kirkkonummi as Jorvaksentie.

The Bastvik manor, dating back to the 19th century, has long since fallen into disrepair. In 2005, the city has started renovating it, and it is planned to host the office of the renovation project architects (Arkkitehtitoimisto Okulus Oy), a café, and a home. The Bastvik projekt includes research of old construction and manufacturing techniques. At some point, Bastvik was planned as a remote facility of the apartment fair held in Kauklahti in summer 2006. However, the plan was abandoned.

The Bastvik manor had a significant sawmill in the 19th century, and because of this, Sågholmen (formerly an island, currently the Sahaniemi peninsula) has been a stopping place for large ships. In the late 1910s, the manor building suffered from lack of management, but in 1923 the farm was bought by Claes Nordstedt, the founder of the Kauklahti glass works, who renovated the building. When the Kauklahti glass works went into bankruptcy, Nordstedt sold the farm to banker Antti Hiltunen and his family in 1928. Hiltunen had the manor building renovated again, this time also architecturally. By the plans of architect Väinö Toivio, the building got a neo-classical, villa-style look. The current 2000s renovation project of the manor building aims to preserve this 1920s spirit.

The Espoo rantaraitti route is planned to extend all the way to Saunalahti. At this moment, the coast of Saunalahti is, except for a few small exceptions, not accessible to the public.

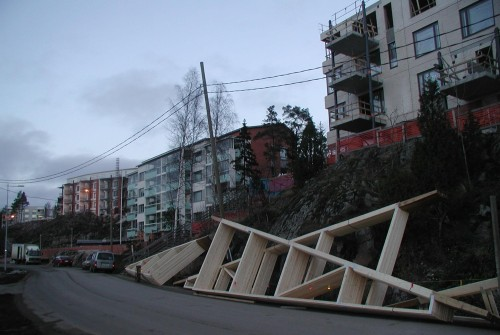
Saunalahti being built in November 2004.

== Construction ==
The houses in Saunalahti are built to preserve the original nature as much as possible. The houses are built at different heights, so that most have a view to the Gulf of Finland. All houses fit in with each other despite not looking exactly alike.

Saunalahti will be the home of 5000 new inhabitants. The first of these moved into the area in autumn 2003. The new district will mostly be finished in 2010.

== Services ==
Saunalahti School was opened in 2012. It began in 2008, when 13 architects at Verstas started designing the school. Construction commenced in 2010 and was completed in 2012. The building also houses the Saunalahti library.

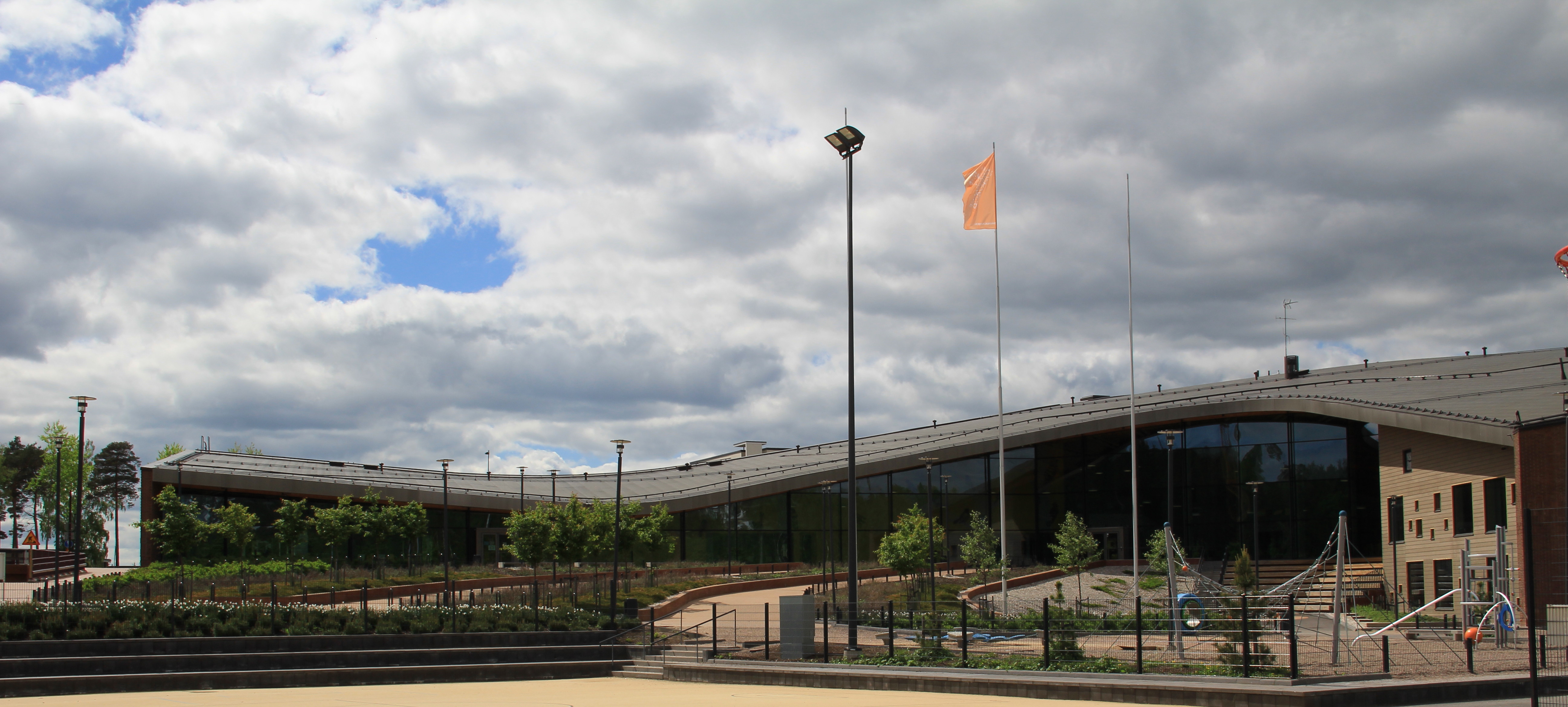
Saunalahti school

== Traffic connections ==
Regional traffic

- The regional bus line 150A goes to Kamppi in Helsinki. The ending stop of line 150A is in Tillinmäki and it goes through Saunalahti.
- The regional bus line 150K goes to Kamppi in Helsinki. The ending stop of line 150K is in Saunalahti.
- The regional bus line 165/165N goes through Saunalahti along the Vanha Saunalahdentie road to Kamppi in Helsinki. The ending stop of line 165/165N is in Kauklahti.

Espoo internal traffic

- The line 65K goes from Espoonkartano via Kauklahti and Saunalahti to Espoonlahti. 65 also goes through the Kauklahti industrial area.

Exchange points

- The nearest exchange point to Espoo internal lines is in Kivenlahti.
- The exchange point to train traffic is in Kauklahti.

== Stores ==
- The Lippulaiva shopping centre is only a short bicycle distance away.
- There are services in nearby Kivenlahti: Alepa, K-market, pharmacy, library, Valintatalo.
- The centre of Kauklahti is a short distance away by car.

== Beaches ==
Saunalahti does not currently have its own beach. The nearest beach is in Kivenlahti, a short walking or bicycle distance away.
