= Helsinki Metro =

Rapid transit system in the Helsinki capital region

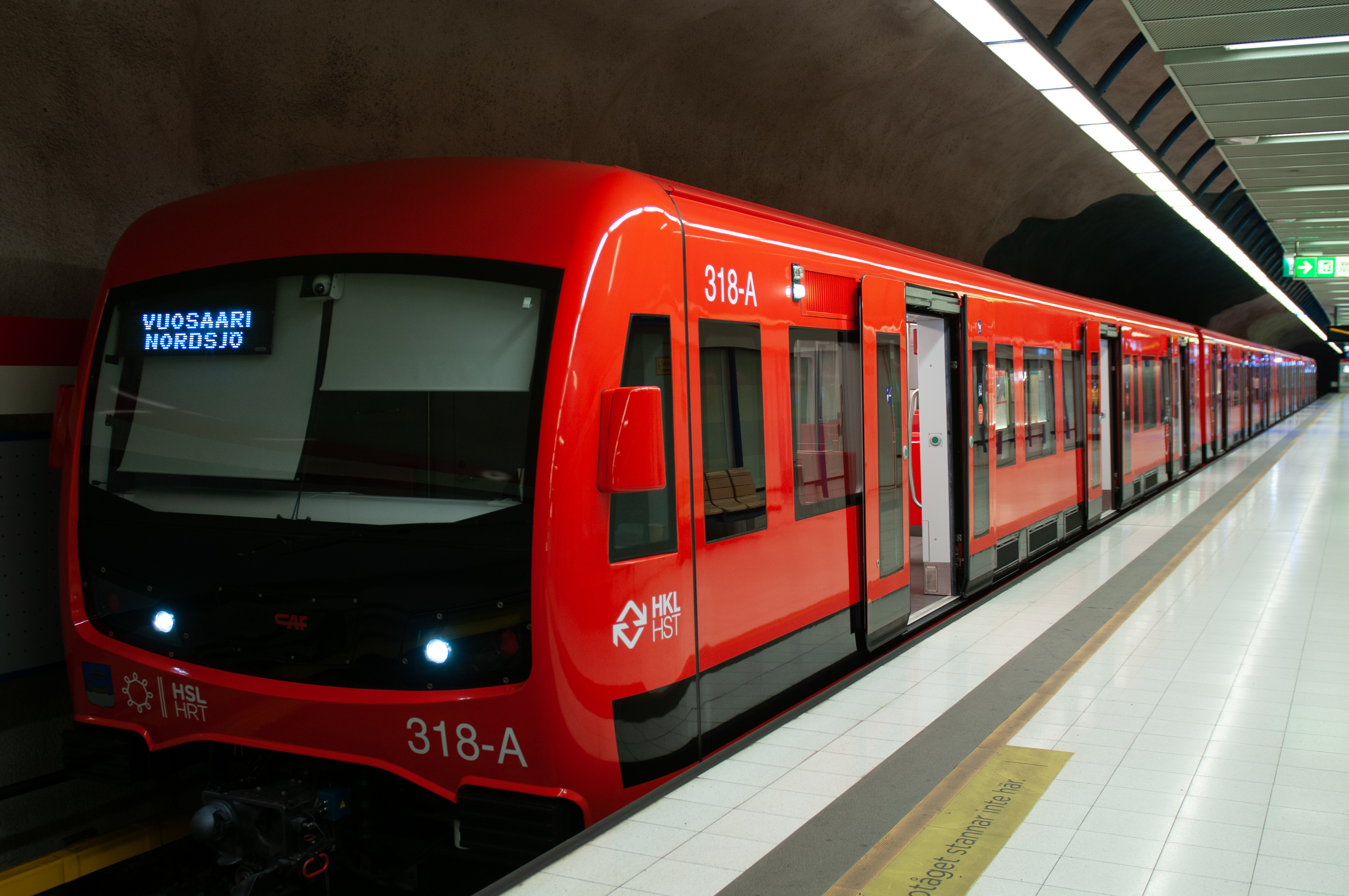
- M300, the newest train in use.

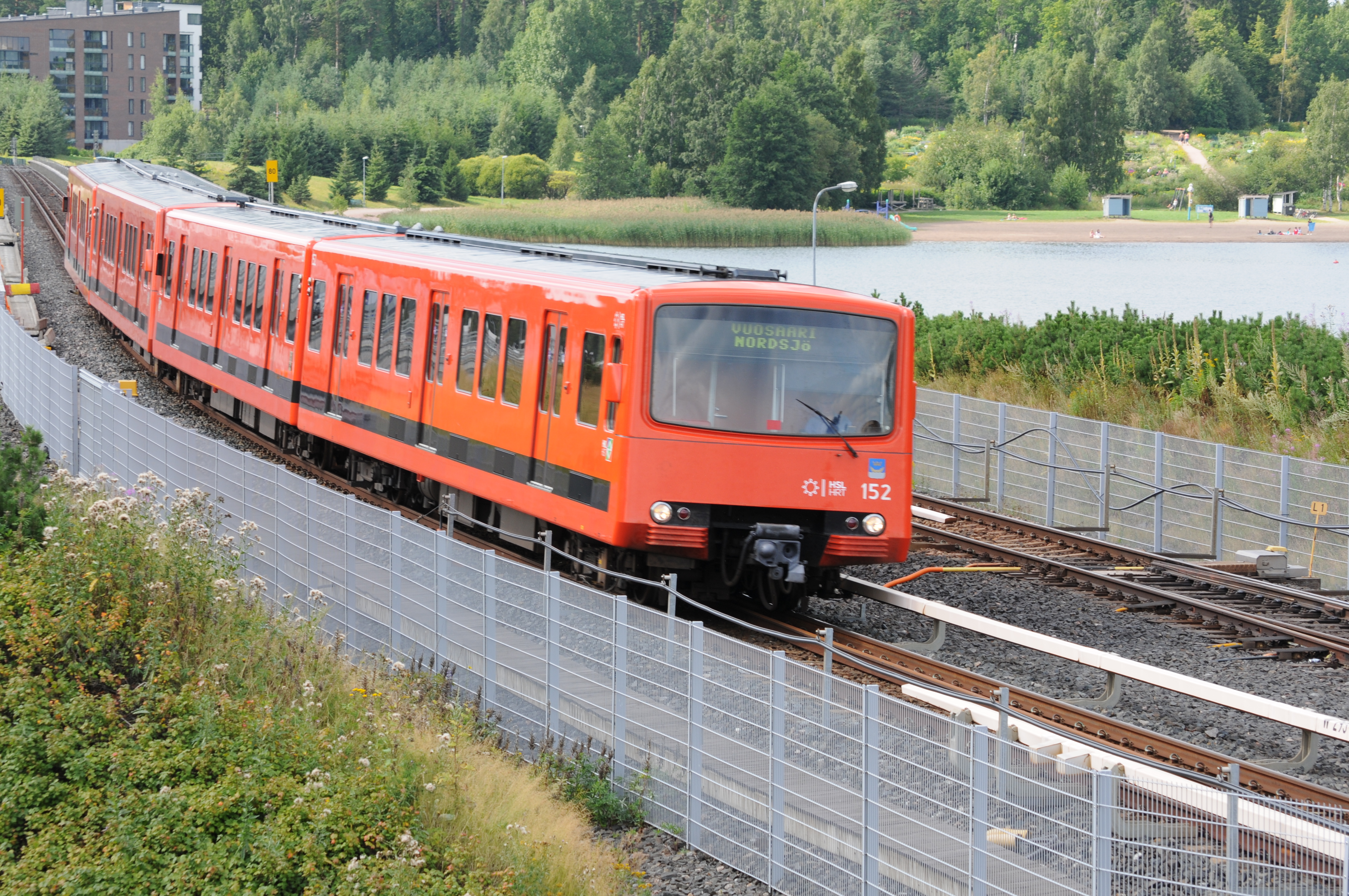
- M100, the oldest class still in use, en route to Vuosaari

Overview
- Native name: Helsingin metro Helsingfors metro
- Locale: Helsinki capital region, Finland
- Transit type: Rapid transit
- Number of lines: 2
- Number of stations: 30
- Daily ridership: 304,000 (2017)
- Annual ridership: 92.6 million (2019)
- Website: HKL Metro

Operation
- Began operation: 2 August 1982; 44 years ago
- Operators: Helsinki City Transport and Metropolitan Area Transport Ltd

Technical
- System length: 43 km (26.7 mi)
- Track gauge: 1,522 mm (4 ft 11 29/32 in) Broad gauge
- Electrification: 750 V DC third rail

The Helsinki Metro (Finnish: Helsingin metro, Swedish: Helsingfors metro) is a rapid transit system serving the Helsinki capital region, Finland. It is the only metro system in Finland as well as the world's northernmost metro system. It was opened to the general public on 2 August 1982 after 27 years of planning. It is operated by Helsinki City Transport and Metropolitan Area Transport Ltd for Helsinki Regional Transport Authority and carries 92.6 million passengers per year.

The Helsinki Metro is a system separate from the main railway network in Finland, forming the core of public transport in Helsinki along with the Helsinki commuter rail, the Helsinki light rail and trunk bus lines in the capital region.

The system consists of 2 lines, serving a total of 30 stations, of which 21 are underground and 9 overground. It has a total length of 43 km (26.7 mi). It is the predominant rail link between the suburbs of East Helsinki and the western suburbs in the city of Espoo and downtown Helsinki.

The line passes under Helsinki Central Station, allowing passengers to transfer to and from the Helsinki commuter rail network, including trains on the Ring Rail Line to Helsinki Airport.

The metro system initially opened in 1982 as a single line from Rautatientori metro station in the center to Itäkeskus in the east, from which one branch reached Mellunmäki in 1989 and another one reached Vuosaari in 1998. In the center, the line extended to Kamppi in 1983 and to Ruoholahti in 1993. The Länsimetro extension, opened on 18 November 2017, expanded the system westwards via Lauttasaari into the neighbouring city of Espoo with Tapiola and Matinkylä as termini. On 3 December 2022 the line was further expanded to the west all the way to Kivenlahti.

The two lines on the system mostly share the same track: M1 operates between Kivenlahti and Vuosaari, while M2 operates between Tapiola and Mellunmäki.

== History ==
=== 1955–67: Light rail plan ===
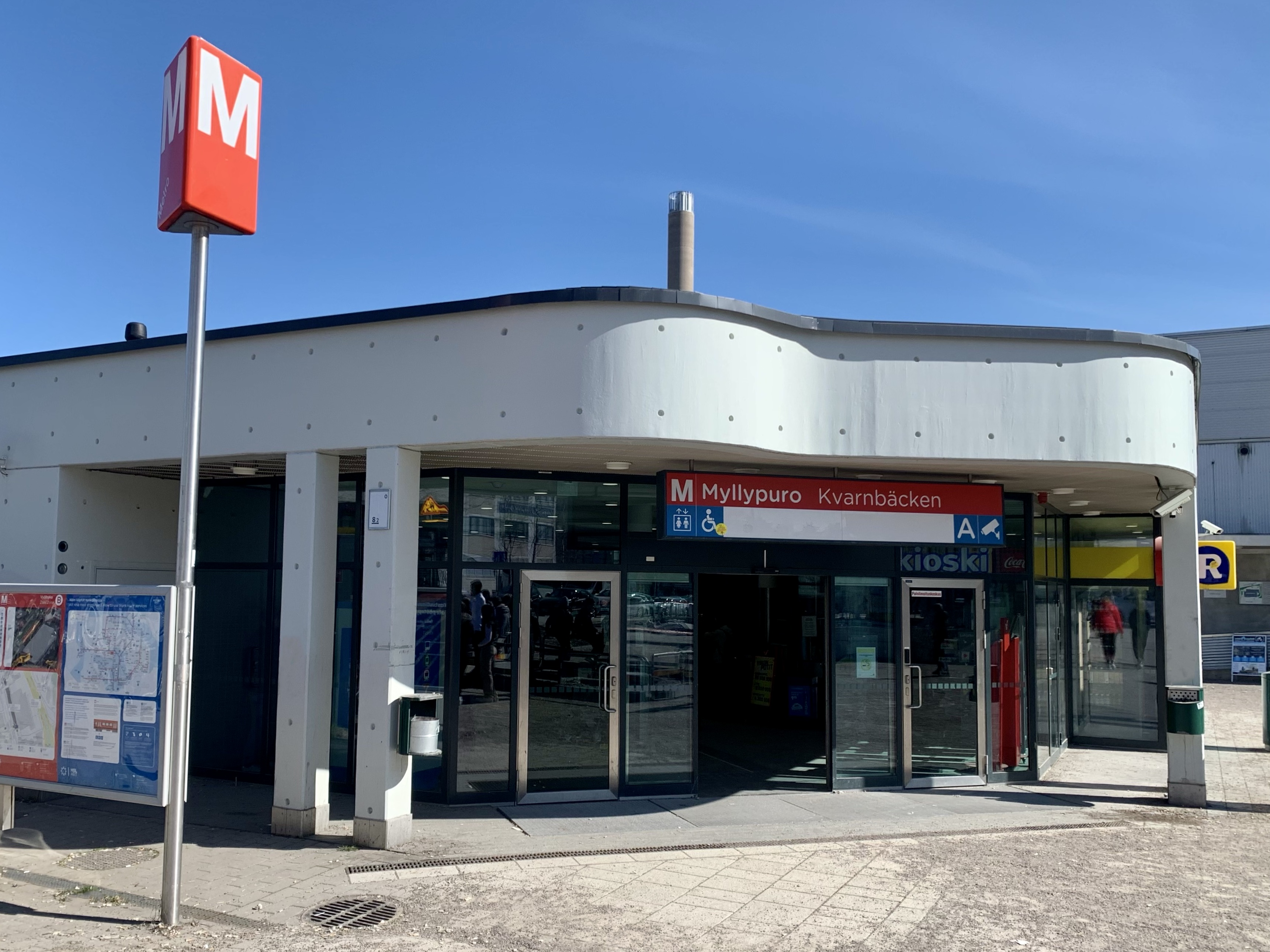
The logo of the Helsinki Metro is a white capital letter M on an orange background. This image shows the entrance to the Myllypuro metro station.

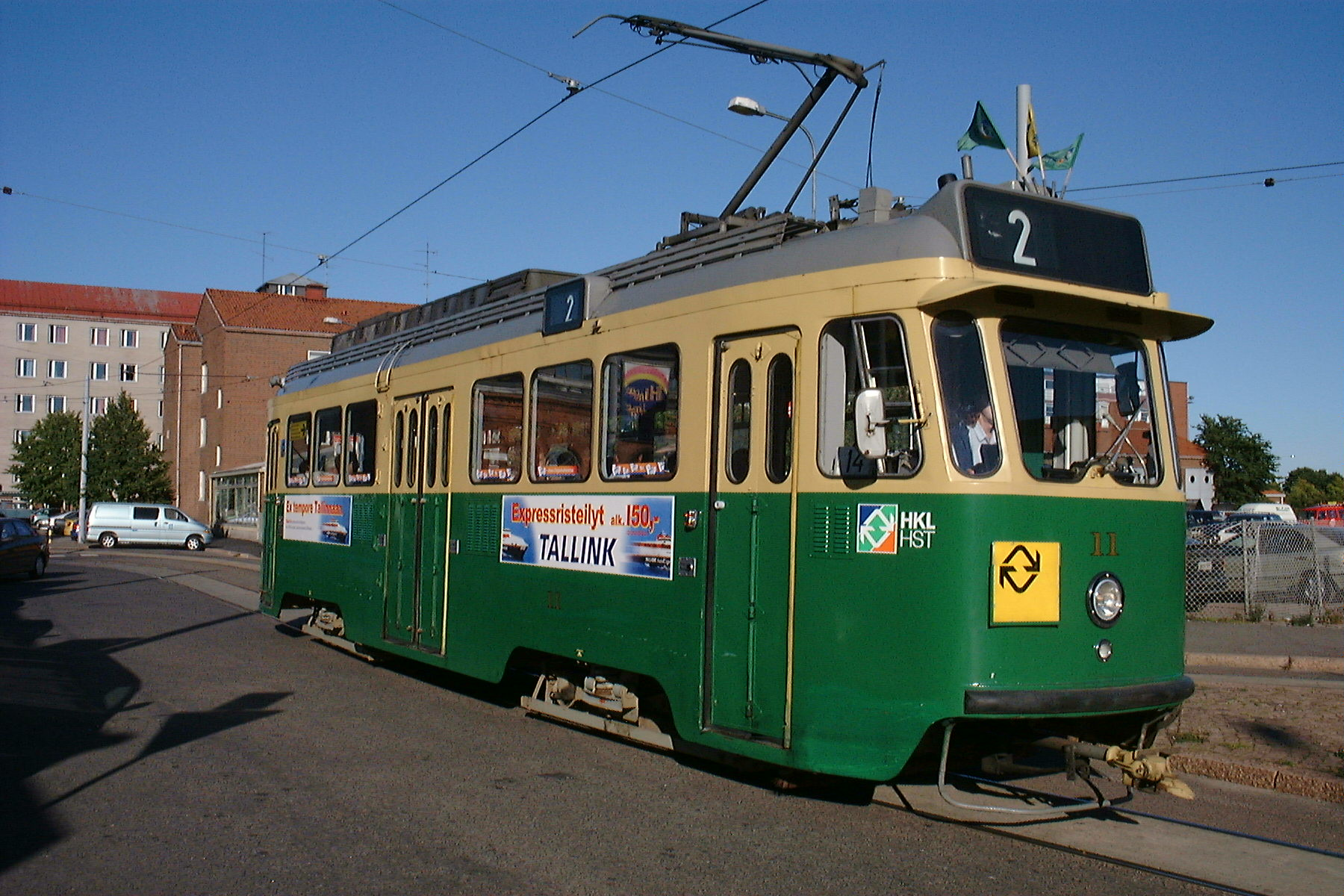
The Karia HM V trams built in 1959 were built with provisions for use on the originally planned light rail-type metro system.

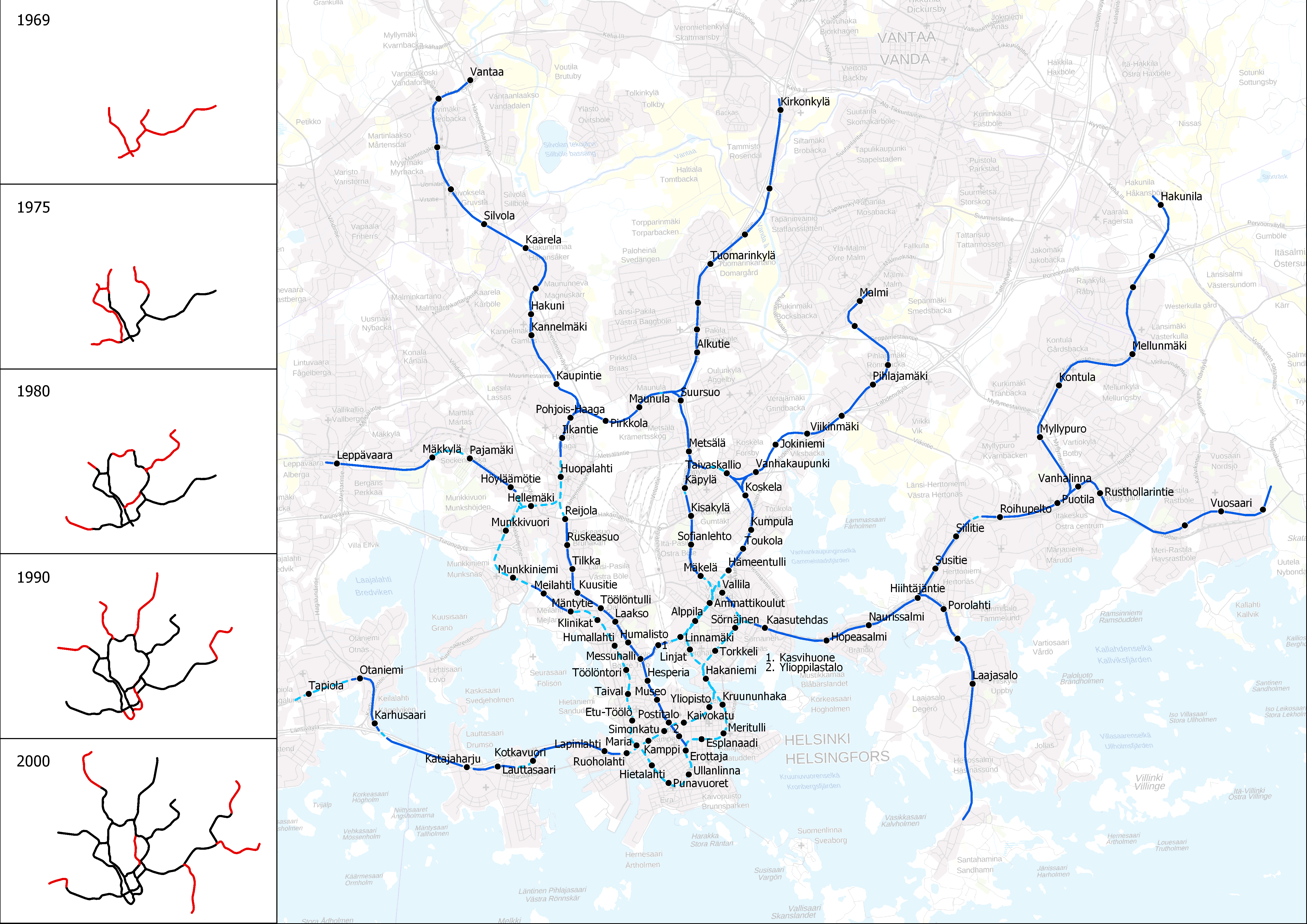
The Metro Commission's 1963 proposal for a metro system in Helsinki. Dark blue = above ground tracks, dashed light blue = underground tracks. Left: proposed construction stages. Basemap from 2018.

The initial motion for building a metropolitan railway system in Helsinki was made in September 1955, though during the five decades beforehand, the idea of a tunneled urban railway for Helsinki had surfaced several times. A suburban traffic committee (Finnish: Esikaupunkiliikenteen suunnittelukomitea) was formed under the leadership of Reino Castrén (1908–1981), and in late 1955, the committee set to work on the issue of whether or not there was truly a need for a tunneled public transport system in Helsinki. After nearly four years of work, the committee presented its findings to the city council.

The committee estimated that the population of Helsinki would grow rapidly, so the capacity of the street network would not be enough for the growing amount of private car traffic and public traffic. The committee proposed moving public transport underground, which would free the overground street network for private car traffic and keep both the direct costs and the indirect costs of public transport in bounds.

The findings of the committee were clear: Helsinki needed a metro system built on separate right-of-way. This was the first time the term "metro" was used to describe the planned system. At the time the committee did not yet elaborate on what kind of vehicles should be used on the metro: trams, heavier rail vehicles, buses or trolleybuses were all alternatives.

The city council's reaction to the committee's presentation was largely apathetic, with several council members stating to the press that they did not understand anything about Castrén's presentation.

Despite the lacklustre reception, Castrén's committee was asked to continue its work, now as the metro committee, although very little funding was provided. In March 1963 the committee led by Reino Castrén and Gunnar Strenius presented its proposal for the Helsinki Metro system. On a technical level this proposal was very different from the system that was finally realised. In the 1963 proposal the metro was planned as a light rail system, running in tunnels a maximum of 14 metres (45 ft 11 in) below the surface (compared to 30 metres (98 ft 5 in) in the finalized system), and with stations placed at shorter intervals (for instance, the committee's presentation shows ten stations between Sörnäinen and Ruoholahti, compared to the six in the realized system). The Castrén Committee proposed for the system to be built in five phases, with the first complete by 1969 and the final by 2000, by which time the system would have a total length of 86.5 kilometres (53.7 mi) reaching well into neighbouring municipalities, with 108 stations. This was rejected after lengthy discussions as too extensive. In 1964 the city commissioned experts from Hamburg, Stockholm and Copenhagen to evaluate the metro proposal. Their opinions were unanimous: a metro was needed and the first sections should be built by 1970.

Although no official decision to build a system along the lines proposed by Castrén was ever made, several provisions for a light rail metro system were made during the 1950s–1960s, including separate lanes on the Kulosaari and Naurissaari bridges, and space for a metro station in the 1964 extension of Munkkivuori shopping center. The RM 1, HM V and RM 3 trams built for the Helsinki tram system in the late 1950s were also equipped to be usable on the possible light rail metro lines.

The first line was agreed to go from Kamppi to Puotila and detailed planning started in 1965 when a metro planning committee was assigned to plan the metro network. By 1966 the planning had already cost 4.67 million markka while the budget of the city of Helsinki had reserved 475 million markka for the period from 1968 to 1977 despite no decision of actually building the metro yet being made.

=== 1967–69: Heavy rail plan ===
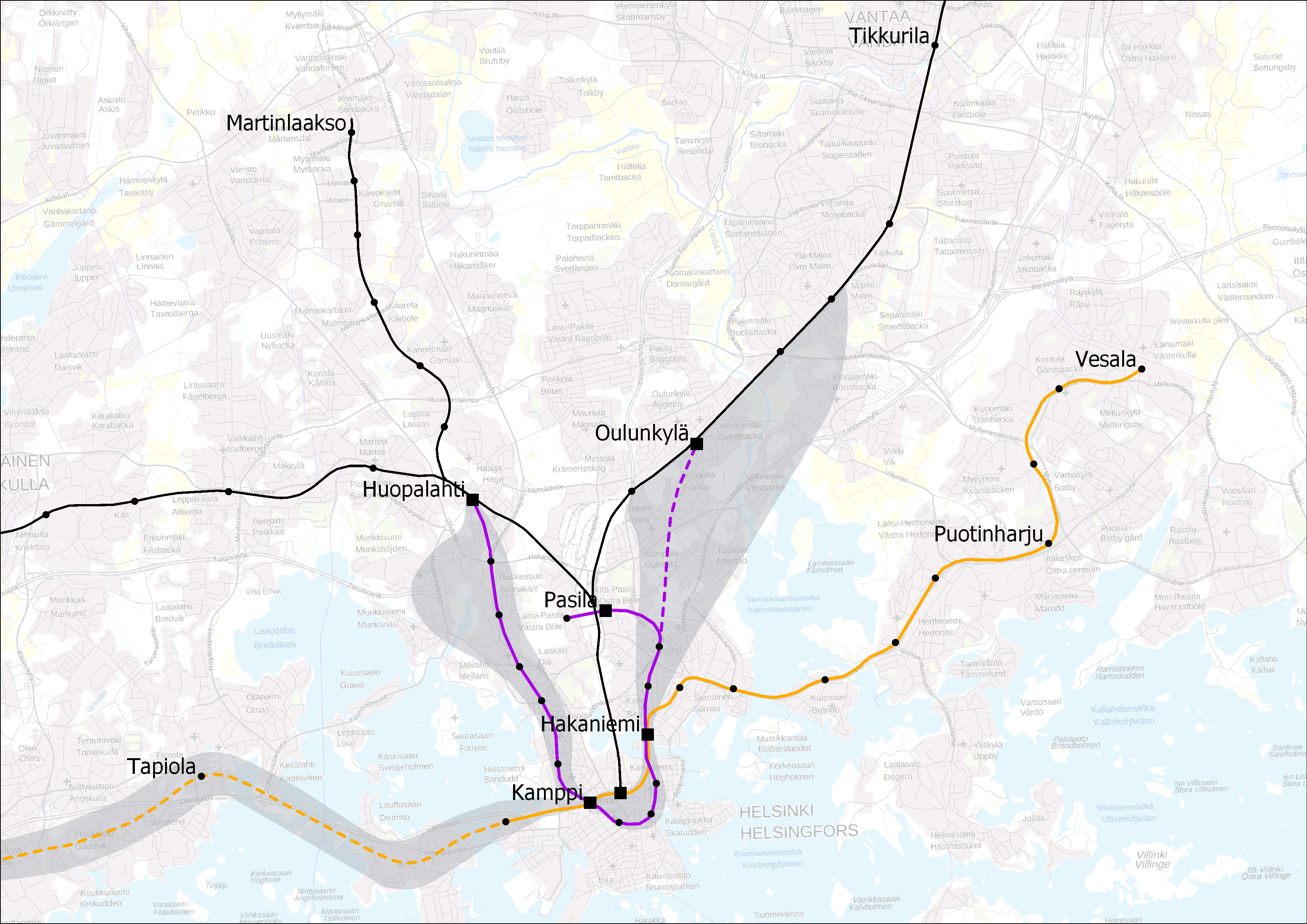
The Metro Office's 1971 proposal for a rail network in Helsinki. Orange = the first metro line, purple = the U metro, black = railways, dashed lines = reservations, grey area = area of tolerance. Basemap from 2018.

In late 1967, Reino Castrén departed Helsinki for Calcutta, where he had been invited as an expert in public transport. Prior to his departure Castrén indicated he planned to return to Helsinki in six months and continue his work as leader of the metro committee.

For the duration of Castrén's absence, Unto Valtanen (1929–1989) was appointed as the leader of the committee. However, by the time Castrén returned, Valtanen's position had been made permanent. Following his appointment Valtanen informed the other members of the committee that the plans made under Castrén's leadership were outdated, and now the metro would be planned as a heavy rail system in deep tunnels mined into bedrock. Following two more years of planning, the Valtanen-led committee's proposal for an initial metro line from Kamppi to Puotila in the east of the city was approved after hours of debate in the city council on the early morning hours of 8 May 1969. The initial section was to be opened for service in 1977.

In 1968 the mayor of Helsinki Teuvo Aura and the director of the VR Group Esko Rekola agreed that VR would take care of traffic to the north and west, and Helsinki City Transit would handle traffic on its own track to the east. In connection to this, the idea of a tight network of several light rail lines was abandoned and a decision was made to build two lines conforming to the railway track standard: one line from Haukilahti in Espoo to Puotinharju and another line, the so-called U-Metro line from Haaga via Erottaja and the Helsinki Market Square to Maunula, which would use the same track width as the main railway network in Finland.

=== 1969–82: Construction ===
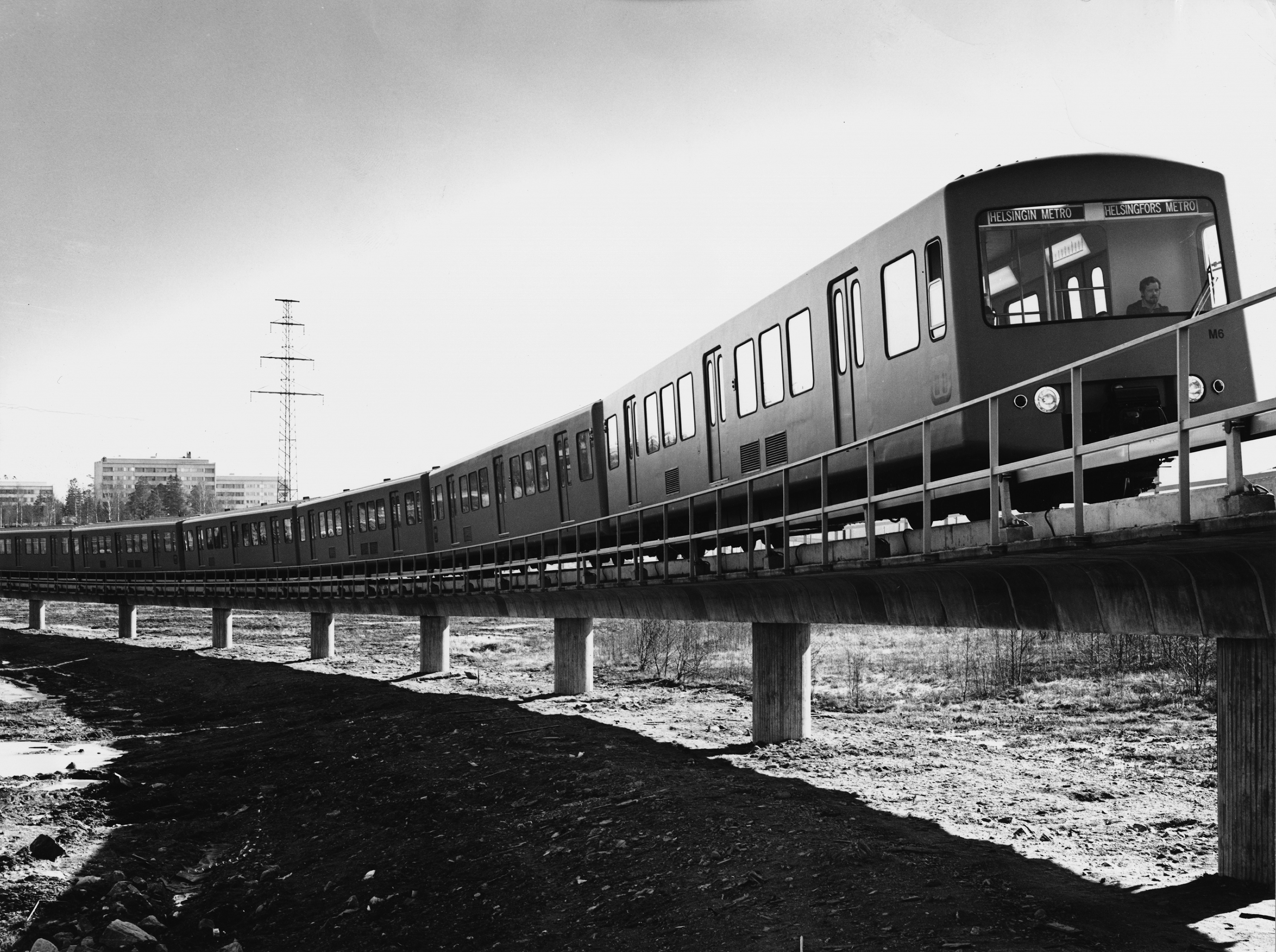
Helsinki Metro test track in 1970s

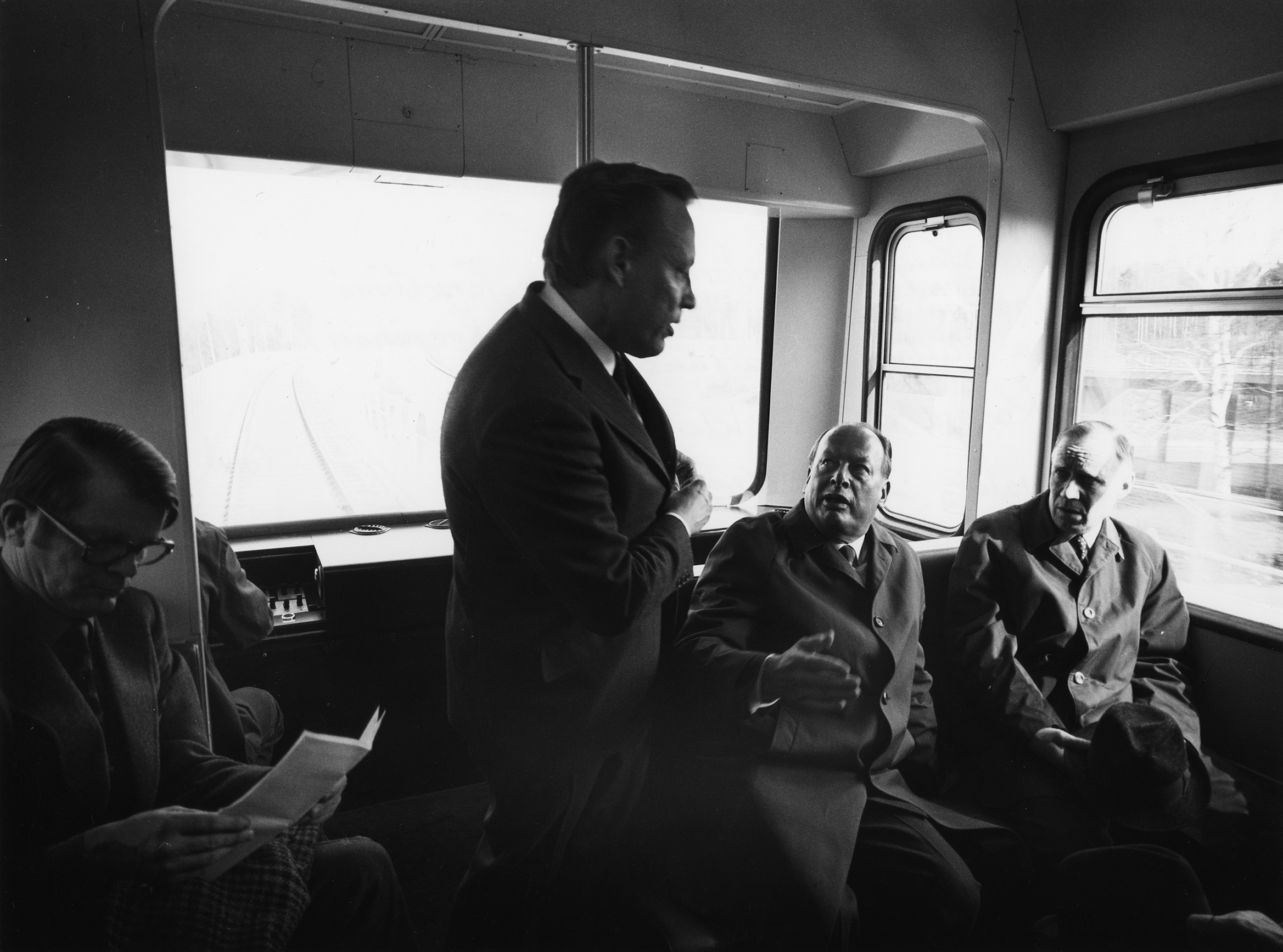
Unto Valtanen (middle) at the handover of the M1 test train on 4 May 1972. Also pictured is the mayor Teuvo Aura (centre-right) and deputy mayor Veikko O. Järvinen (left).

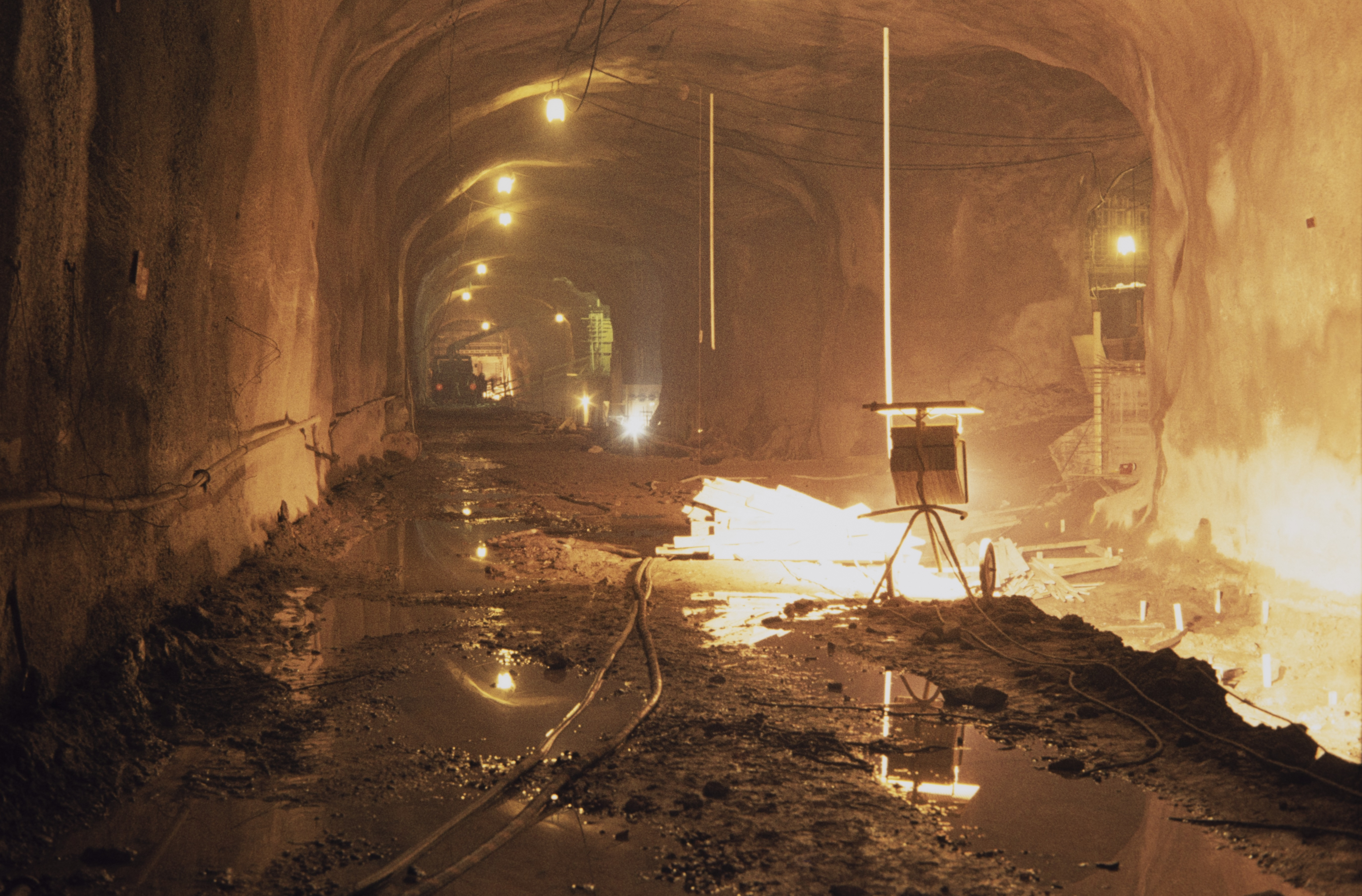
A view of the metro tunnel construction site in 1978

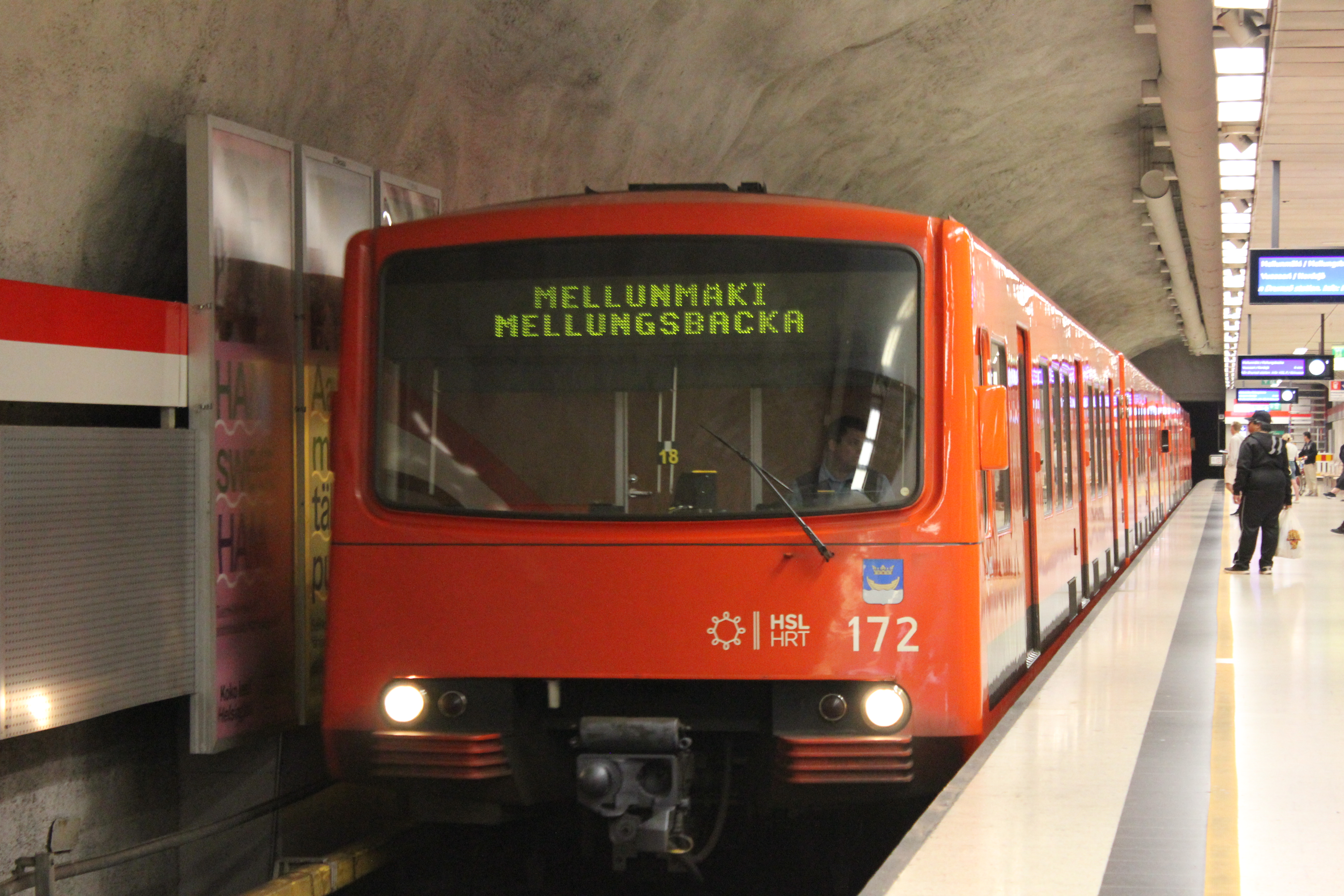
An M100 metro train at Kamppi metro station

The decision to start construction of the metro was delayed because of votes held by the city council of Helsinki. The Left Alliance and some of the council members from the Swedish People's Party of Finland, as well as the liberals, supported construction of the metro, but the National Coalition Party opposed the project for the entirety of its design. Finally, on 7 May 1969 the city council made a decision to start the first phase of construction, and the decision was approved on 12 May. The idea was to have the construction of the line completed by the year 1977.

Construction of a 2.8-kilometre (1.7 mi) testing track from the depot in Roihupelto to Herttoniemi was begun in 1969 and finished in 1971. The first prototype train, units M1 and M2, arrived from the Valmet factory in Tampere on 10 November 1971, with further four units (M3–M6) arriving the following year. Car M1 burned in the metro depot in 1973.

Excavating the metro tunnels under central Helsinki had begun in June 1971. Most of the tunneling work had been completed by 1976, excluding the Kluuvi bruise (Finnish: Kluuvin ruhje), a wedge of clay and pieces of rock in the bedrock, discovered during the excavation process. To build a tunnel through the bruise an unusual solution was developed: the bruise was turned into a giant freezer, with pipes filled with Freon 22 pushed through the clay. The frozen clay was then carefully blasted away, with cast iron tubes installed to create a durable tunnel. Construction of the first stations, Kulosaari and Hakaniemi begun in 1974. The Kulosaari station was the first to be completed, in 1976, but construction of the other stations took longer. As the case with many underground structures in Helsinki, the underground metro stations were designed to also serve as bomb shelters.

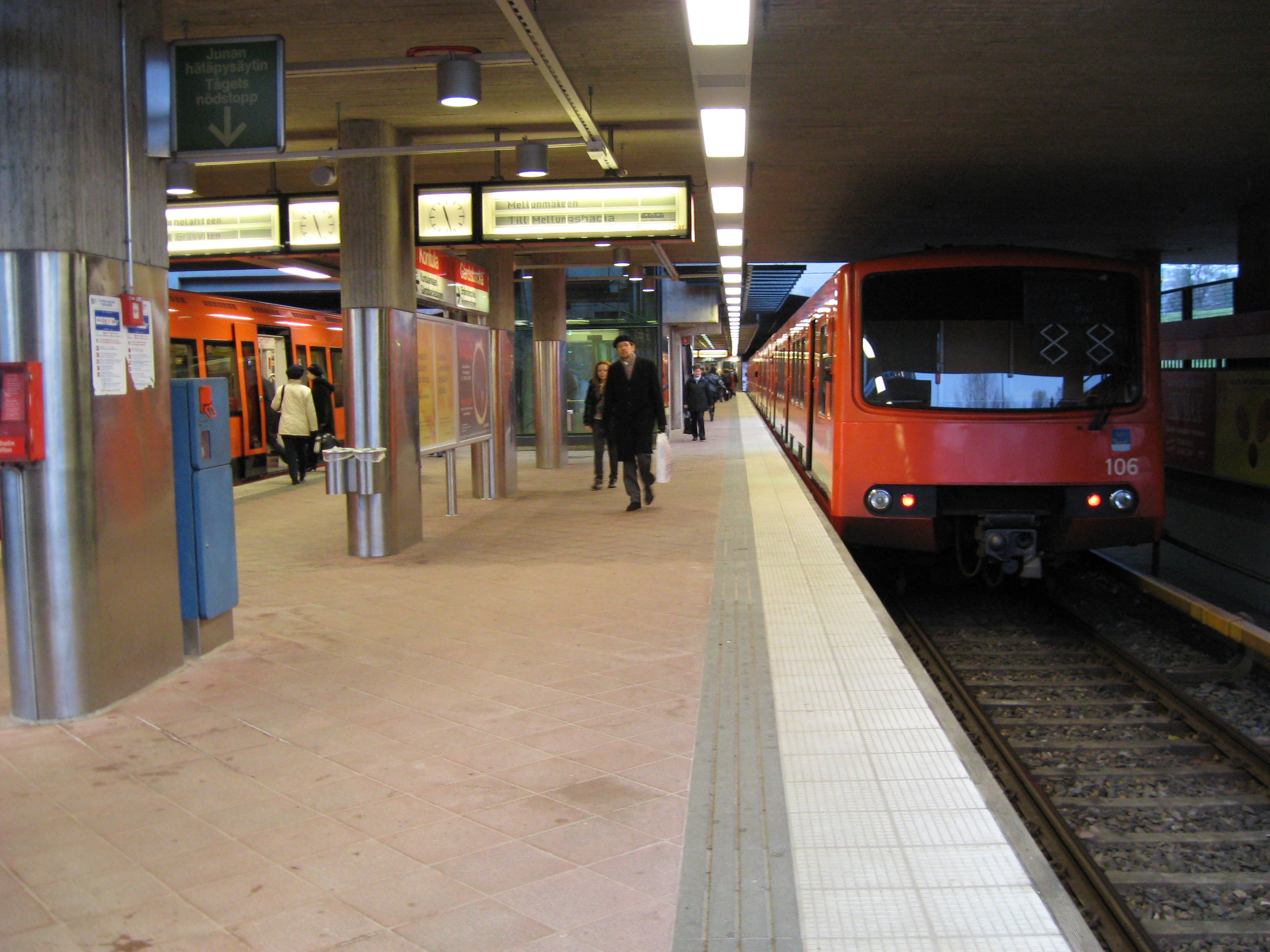
One of the M100 series prototypes, number 106 (right) at Kontula station.

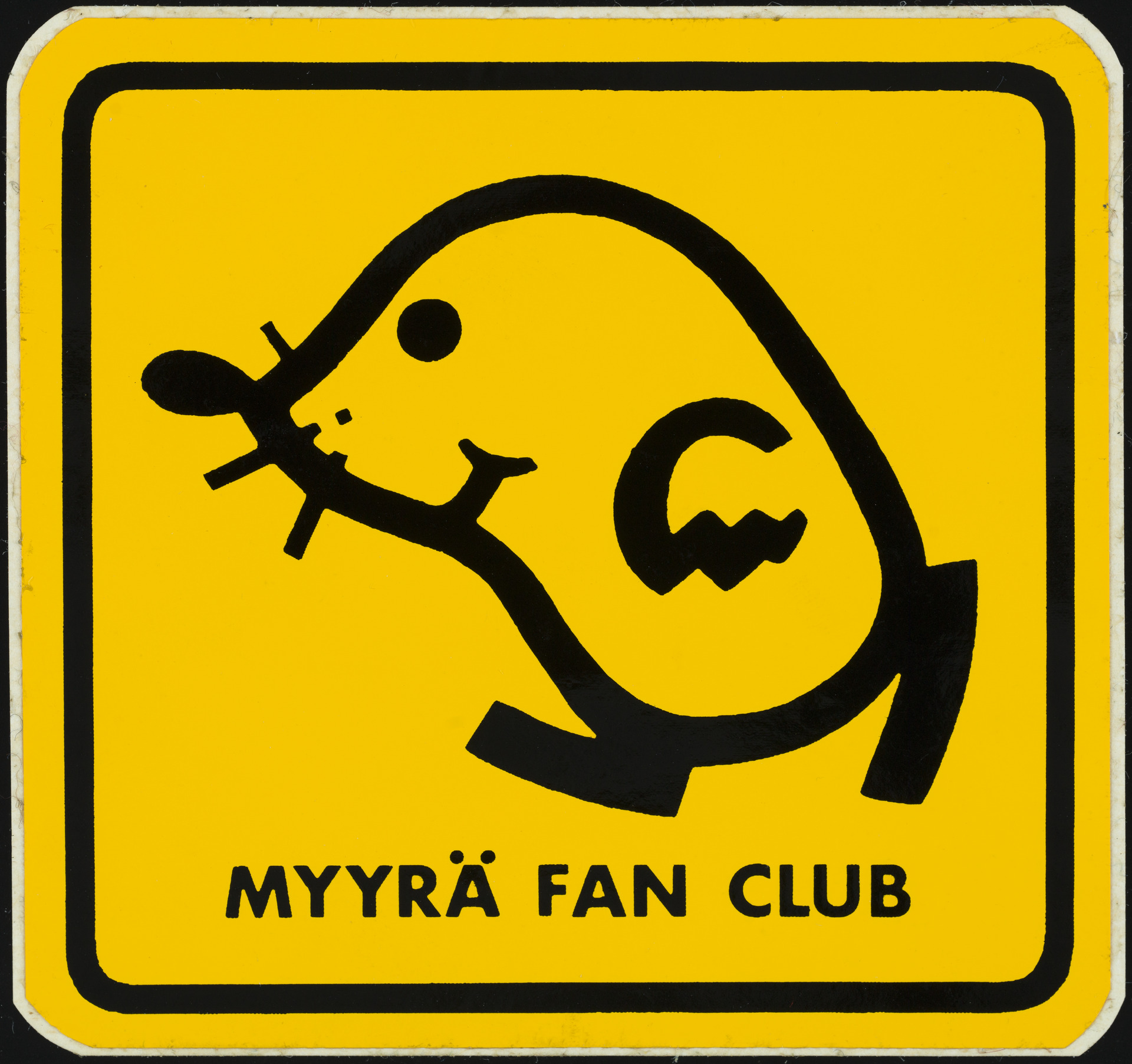
A design contest was held for a logo for the Helsinki Metro. Osmo Leivo's entry featuring a cartoon mole won the favour of the general public.

When the construction of the metro started, the companies Valmet and Strömberg started developing a series of metro trains suitable for the Helsinki Metro together with other companies. Strömberg made an extensive definition of the technics used for the rolling stock and also made a specific research contract with the metro. As a result, three double-carriage trains were made for test use from 1971 and 1972, and these trains were used for test drives on the test track built between the current depot and the Siilitie metro station. These tests showed numerous problems, for example too little power when driving at a slow speed. The test trains used DC motors. After the tests, a new series of trains was designed in 1974, of which the three first prototype units (numbers 101 to 106) were built in 1977. A VR Class Dv12 locomotive hauled the first carriage pair of the new test trains from the Valmet aeroplane factory in Tampere to Helsinki on Monday 20 June 1977. The new train series was named M100 and it was equipped with induction motors controlled by a variable-frequency drive. The motor control device built for the Helsinki Metro, named SAMI ("Strömbergin Asynkroni Moottori Invertterikäyttö") also became popular elsewhere, and it was used in Finland for example in the control system for the fuel switching device at the Loviisa nuclear power plant.

The first test trains were originally designed as automatic trains that did not need a driver. Already at that time, the Helsinki Metro had been planned as an automatic metro system, and test drives with automatic metro trains were started on 5 April 1974. This plan for automatic metro trains was later abandoned and replaced with a return to completely manually controlled trains and a conventional railway track signal system. One of the test trains caught fire at the depot in 1973, which led to many improvements in the fire safety of the trains, such as abandoning cushions on the seats. These test trains were never used for actual passenger traffic, and the last of them were scrapped in 1988.

The metro carriages were designed by the interior architect Antti Nurmesniemi and the industrial designer Börje Rajalin.

=== Corruption scandal ===
In 1974 the metro committee ordered a prototype for a train in the series and gave a guarantee about a follow-up order, bypassing the city council. In summer 1976, Teuvo Aura, the mayor of Helsinki, signed an agreement with Valmet and Strömberg to purchase 13 trains of six carriages each required for the metro from them. The agreed price was 345 million markka, and the deal was made directly, without any contest. The documents were also classified as secret. Teuvo Aura gave the Metrovaunut company founded by Strömberg and Valmet a loan to pay for the trains, and Unto Valtanen, the leader of the committee, promised the committee would take care of the loan interest, causing the city of Helsinki to pay interest for a loan given to an outsider company to itself.

In doing so Aura bypassed the city council completely, reportedly because he feared the council would decide to buy the rolling stock from manufacturers in the Soviet Union instead. Later investigation found out that this had not caused any real damage to the city.

The provincial government started investigating suspicions of Aura overstepping his authority in 1979. A committee formed by the police and the city council investigated the involvement of the mayor, the city council, the metro committee and its leader in the decisions and use of money. The investigation led to all charges being dropped.

By this time the direct current–based technology of the M1 series trains had become outdated. In 1977 prototypes for the M100 train series (referred to as "nokkajuna", English: "beak train", to differentiate from the M1 prototypes) were delivered. In these units the direct current from the power rail was converted to alternating current powering induction motors. The M100 trains were the first metro trains in the world to be equipped with such technology.

Aura bypassing the city council in acquiring the rolling stock was not the only questionable part of the construction process of the Metro. On 3 June 1982, two days after the Metro had been opened for provisional traffic, Unto Valtanen came under investigation for taking bribes. Subsequently, the Supreme Court of Finland charged several members of the metro committee and Helsinki municipal executive committee in addition to Valtanen with taking bribes. In the end it was found that charges against all the accused except Valtanen had expired. On 23 October 1987 Valtanen was convicted to one year and nine months in prison for having taken 80 thousand Deutsche Mark and a motor boat as bribes from Siemens.

=== 1982 onwards: In service ===
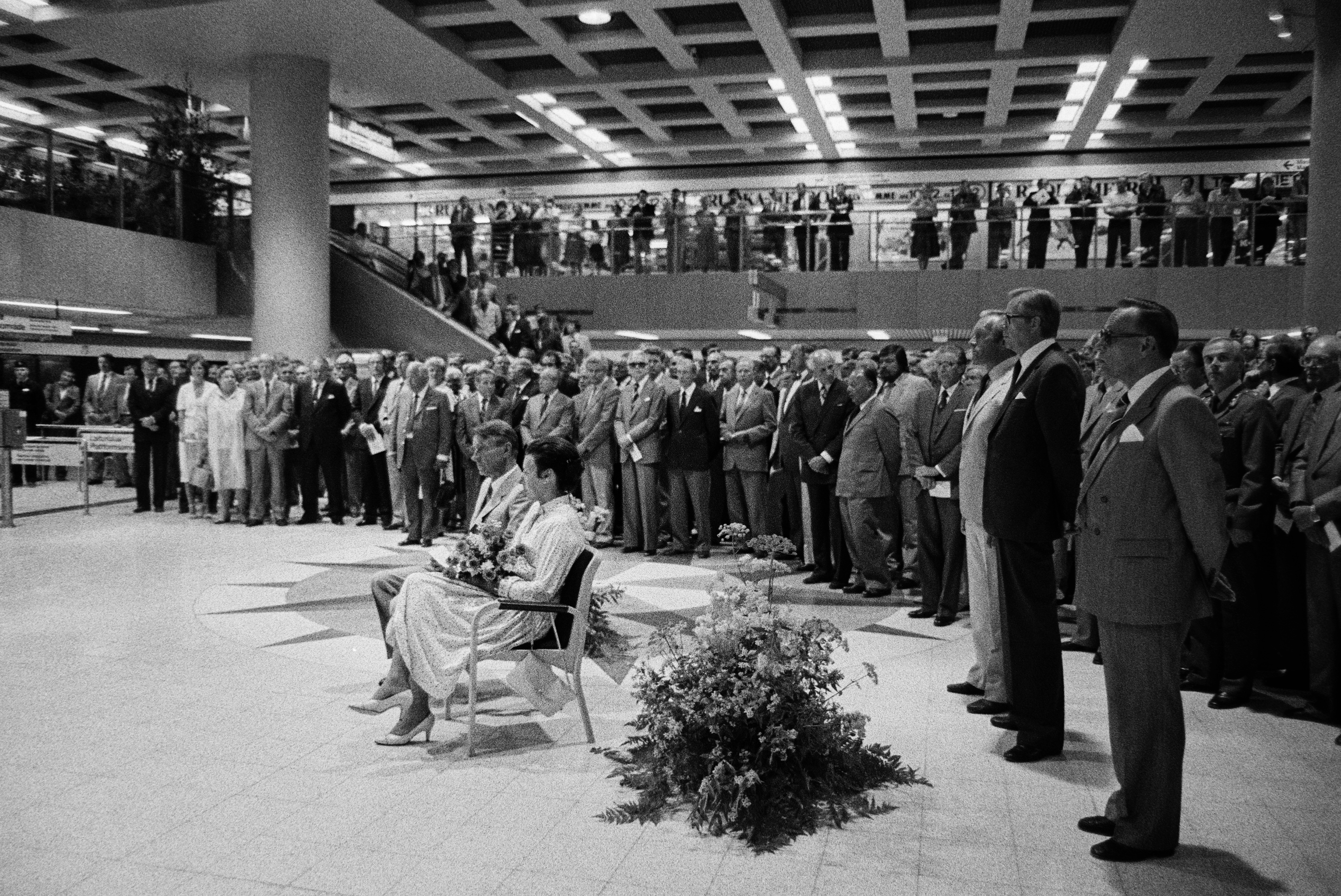
Opening ceremony on 2 August 1982. President of Finland Mauno Koivisto and his wife Tellervo Koivisto are seated at the front.

On 1 June 1982 at 05:32 in the morning, the test drives were opened to the general public. Trains ran with passengers during the morning and afternoon rush hours between Itäkeskus and Hakaniemi (the Sörnäinen station was not yet opened at this time). On 1 July the provisional service was extended to Rautatientori. The official opening ceremony of the metro was held on 2 August 1982, five years behind the original schedule. President of the Republic of Finland Mauno Koivisto officially opened the Metro for traffic on 2 August 1982 – 27 years after the initial motion to the city assembly had been made. Regular all-day traffic between the Rautatientori and Itäkeskus metro stations started on the next day. In 1977, the city council of Helsinki had agreed to transfer control of the metro from the metro committee to the Helsinki City Transit. The metro committee ceased to exist at the end of the year 1982.

Feeder traffic was started in phases in early September 1982, and was originally limited to outside rush hours. In 1986 the feeder lines started using a proof-of-payment system, which ended in 1992.

The Metro did not immediately win the approval from inhabitants of eastern Helsinki, whose direct bus links to the city centre had now been turned into feeder lines for the Metro. Within six months of the Metro's official opening, a petition signed by 11,000 people demanded the restoration of direct bus links. Subsequently, the timetables of the feeder services were adjusted and opposition to the Metro mostly died down.

On 1 March 1983, the Metro was extended in the west to Kamppi. The Sörnäinen station, between Hakaniemi and Kulosaari, was opened on 1 September 1984.

The Metro was extended eastwards in the late 1980s, with the Kontula and Myllypuro stations opened in 1986, and the Mellunmäki station following in 1989. The construction of a westwards expansion begun in 1987 with tunneling works from Kamppi towards Ruoholahti. The Ruoholahti metro station was opened on 16 August 1993.

Another new station followed: the Kaisaniemi station, between Rautatientori and Hakaniemi, was opened on 1 March 1995. Its construction had, in fact, been decided on in 1971, and the station cavern had been carved out of the rock during the original tunneling works, but a lack of funds had pushed back the station's completion.

On 31 August 1998, after four years of construction, the final section of the original plan was completed, with the opening of a three-station fork from Itäkeskus to Vuosaari.

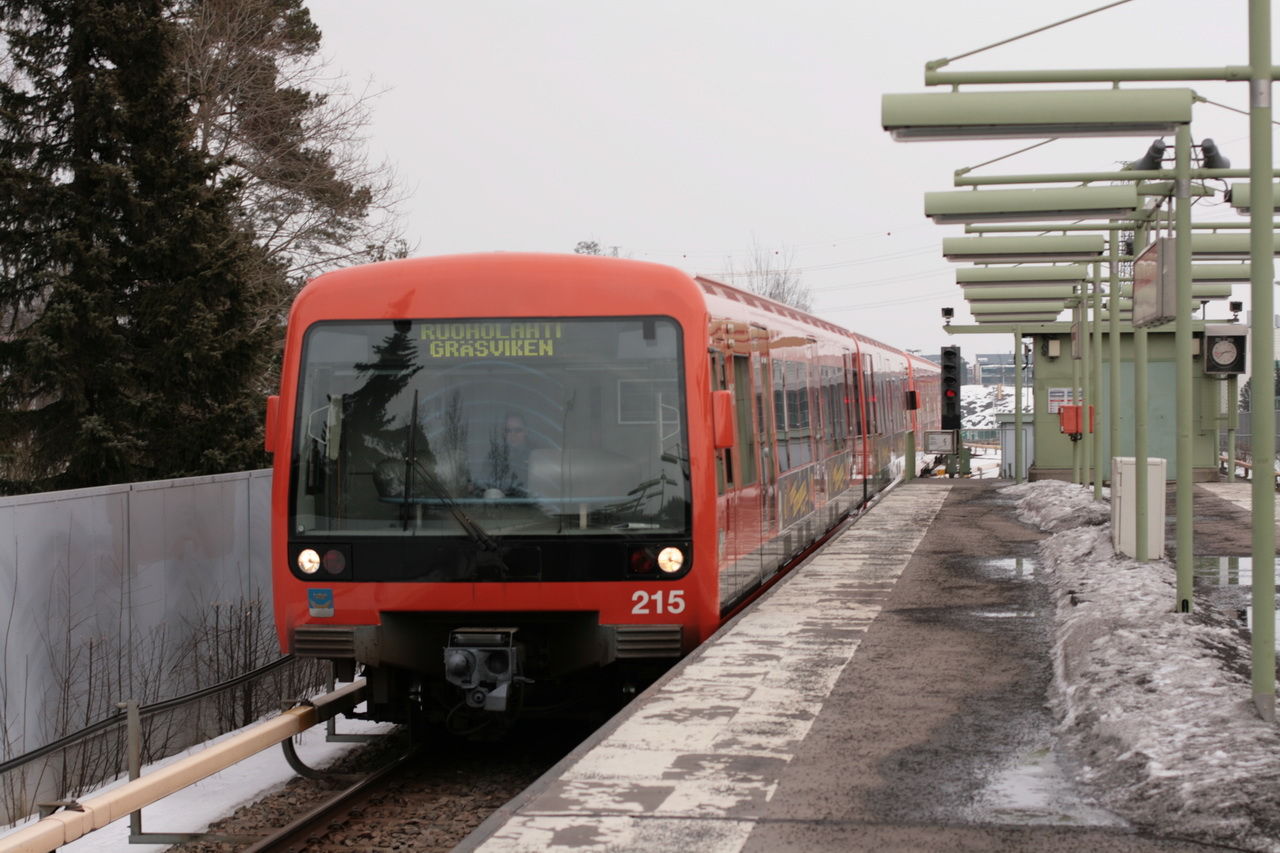
M200 class metro train at Kulosaari metro station in March 2009.

The second generation of Metro trains to be used in passenger service (the M200s) were delivered in 2000 and 2001 by Bombardier. These trains are based on Deutsche Bahn's Class 481 EMUs used on the Berlin S-Bahn network.

On 25 September 2006, the city council of Espoo approved, after decades of debate, planning, and controversy, the construction of a western extension of the Metro. Metro trains began to run to Matinkylä in late 2017. (See section The future below.)

On 1 January 2007, Kalasatama station, between the Sörnäinen and Kulosaari stations, was opened. It serves the new "Sörnäistenranta-Hermanninranta" (Eastern Harbour) area, a former port facility redeveloped as its functions were relocated to the new Port of Vuosaari in the east of the city.

On 8 November 2009, the Rautatientori station, under the Central Railway Station, was closed due to flooding caused by a burst water main. After renovations, the station reopened for public use on 15 February 2010. The lifts were fully replaced; the new ones opened on 21 June 2010. On 23 August 2019, heavy rain caused the Rautatientori station to close once again due to flooding. The station reopened in a matter of days, but the lifts again took many months to fix, finally reopening on 17 March 2020.

=== 2006 onwards: The western extension ===
Map of the Helsinki commuter rail network along with the metro line and their planned extensions

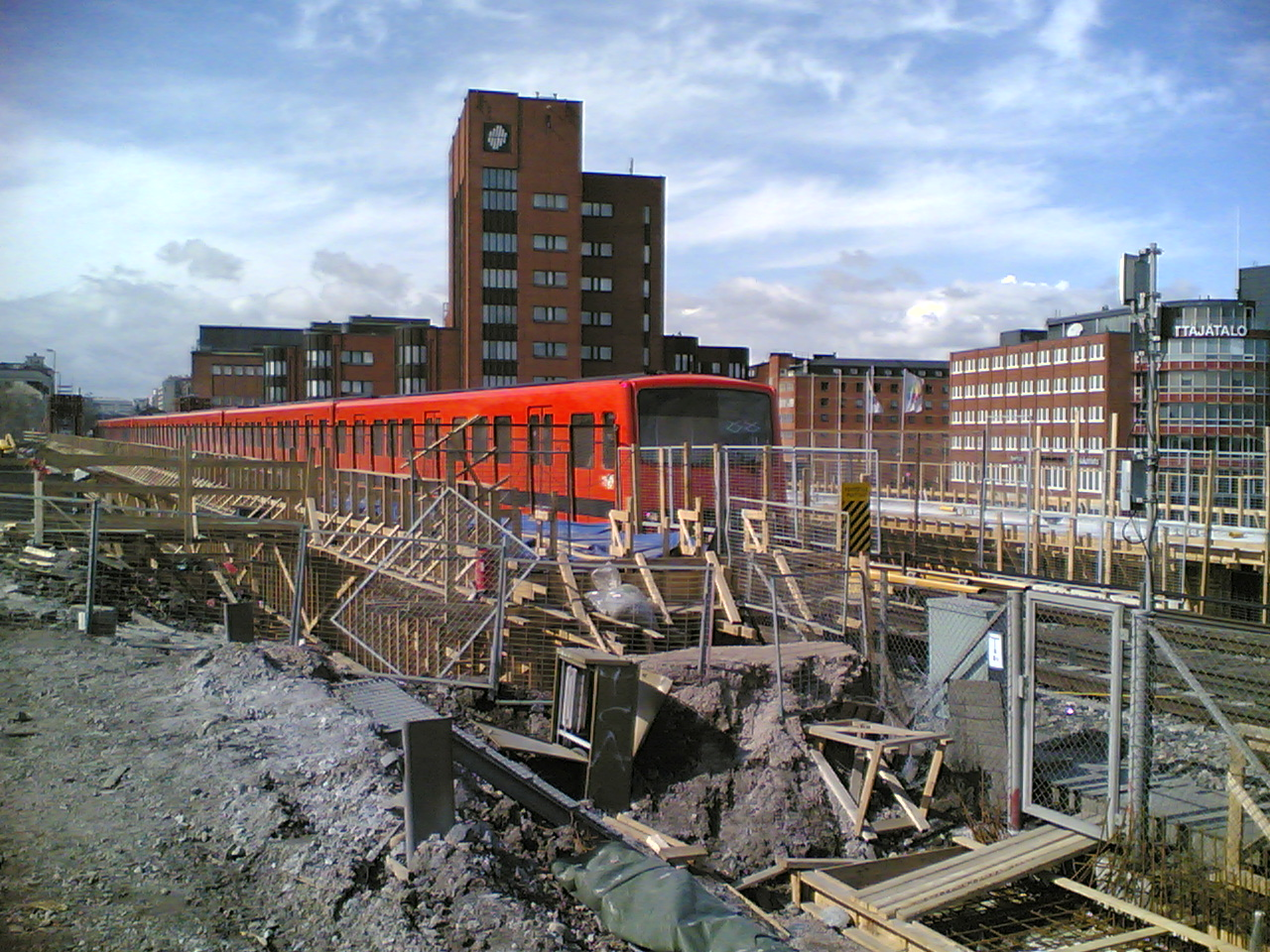
The Kalasatama metro station under construction in summer 2006.

The construction of the Western extension from Ruoholahti to Matinkylä in Espoo was approved by the Espoo city council in 2006. Construction began in 2009 and the extension was opened on 18 November 2017. This first stage of the extension was 14 km (8.7 mi) long, with eight new stations, two in Helsinki and six in Espoo and was built entirely in a tunnel excavated in bedrock.

After first stage of the Western extension opened, the bus lines in Southern Espoo were reconfigured as feeder lines to either Matinkylä or Tapiola metro stations instead of terminating at Kamppi in the centre of Helsinki. After much outcry, four new peak-time lines began running into Kamppi on 22 August 2018.

Before the extension of the metro, trains could be a maximum length of three units (each unit being two cars) but the new stations west of Ruoholahti were built shorter than the existing stations because it was originally planned to introduce driverless operation. The driverless project was cancelled in 2015, but the shorter new stations mean that the maximum train length is reduced to two units, shorter than on the original sections of the metro. To increase capacity, the automatic train protection system theoretically permits headway as short as 90 seconds, if required in the future.

The decision to fund the construction of the second stage, from Matinkylä to Kivenlahti, was taken by the Espoo city council and the state of Finland in 2014. Construction began in late 2014. This stage of extension is 7 km (4.3 mi) long and includes five new stations and a new depot in Sammalvuori. All of the track, including the depot, was built in tunnels. The line opened for passenger traffic on the 3rd of December 2022. As with the first phase to Matinkylä, the feeder lines that used ro run to Matinkylä bus terminal were changed to run to Espoonlahti bus terminal in Lippulaiva shopping centre. Also in common with the first phase, many people were unhappy with the reorganisation of bus lines. Those living in Kivenlahti and Saunalahti, especially, were annoyed at direct bus lines into Kamppi, taking 25–30 minutes, being replaced with feeder lines to Espoonlahti, a transfer to the metro and a half-hour metro ride into the city centre.

=== Timetable displays ===
The timetable displays were renewed in 2012 and were taken into use in December 2012 together with the renewal of the metro control system. The old timetable displays were quite old-fashioned backlit LCD displays. Spare parts were no longer available and because of this, the Kalasatama metro station did not have any timetable displays for a long time, nor did the Kulosaari metro station after it had been renovated. One of the old timetable displays has been left in place at the Ruoholahti metro station. One of the old control boards has also been preserved, and it is on display at the Hakaniemi metro station. In April 2006 blue lights and floor markings were added to metro stations to signify the stopping place of shorter metro trains. As well as the timetable displays, stations also have LCD displays on the upper levels, showing the termini and line number of the following trains and the time left until they reach the station. These displays replaced older LED screens which served the same purpose. For a long time, these estimated times were based on the timetables instead of the actual metro traffic, but as the new control system was taken into place in early 2020, the systems have been integrated together.

=== Timeline ===
Helsinki Metro timeline
Time	Event	Comment
1969	A decision of constructing a metro network was made	
1971	Vartiokylä - Siilitie	Test track, excavation of metro line tunnels underneath the Helsinki city centre is started
1982	Hakaniemi - Itäkeskus	Passenger traffic opened on 1 June 1982
1982	Rautatientori - Itäkeskus	Siilitie metro station, Kulosaari metro station and Herttoniemi metro station opened
1983	Kamppi metro station	Opened
1984	Sörnäinen metro station	Opened
1986	Myllypuro metro station and Kontula metro station	Opened
1987	Construction of track from Ruoholahti metro station to Kamppi metro station started	
1989	Mellunmäki metro station	Opened
1993	Ruoholahti metro station	Opened
1995	Kaisaniemi metro station	Opened
1998	Vuosaari branch opened	Puotila, Rastila and Vuosaari metro stations opened
2007	Kalasatama metro station	Opened
2008	The city council of Espoo made a decision of building the Länsimetro extension	
2009	Construction of the first part of Länsimetro started	Ruoholahti - Matinkylä
2011	Vuosaari harbour	Service track connected to the Finnish Main Line opened
2014	Construction of the second phase of Länsimetro started	Matinkylä - Kivenlahti
2017	The first phase of Länsimetro opened	
2022	The second phase of Länsimetro opened	Matinkylä - Kivenlahti

== Network ==
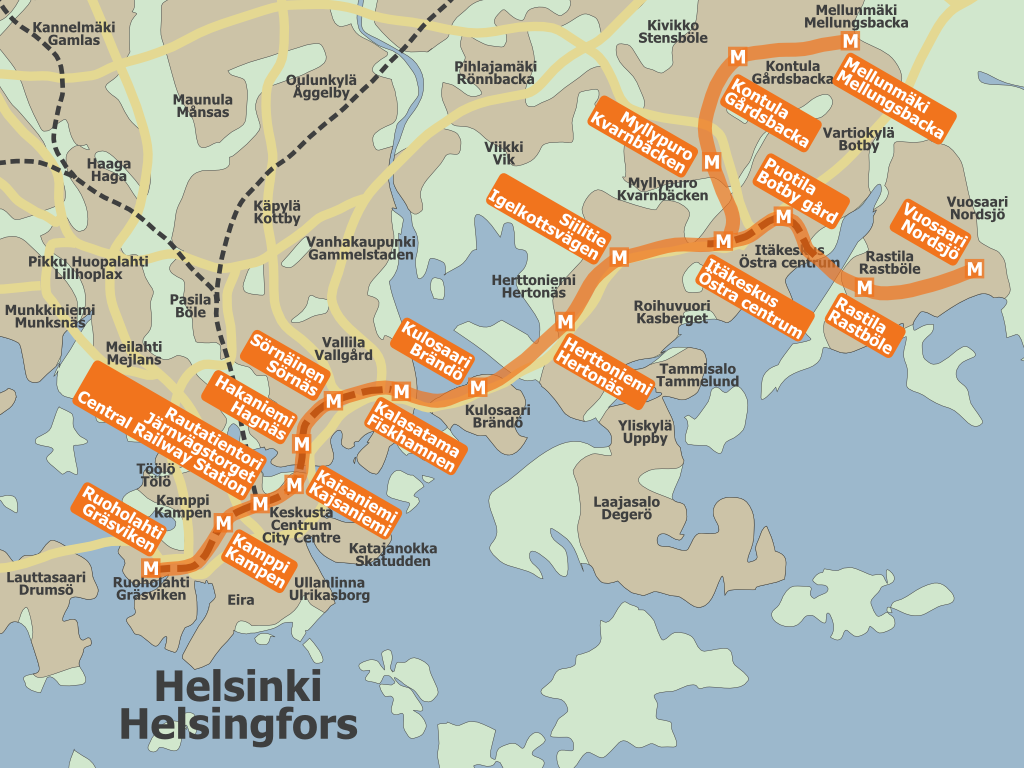
Helsinki Metro in 2007

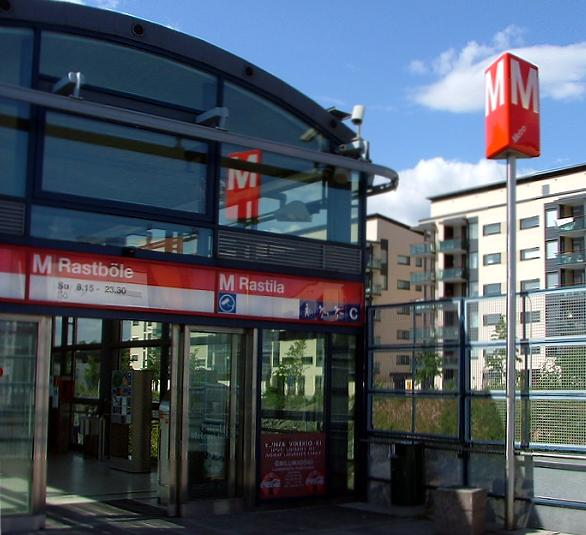
The entrance to Rastila station

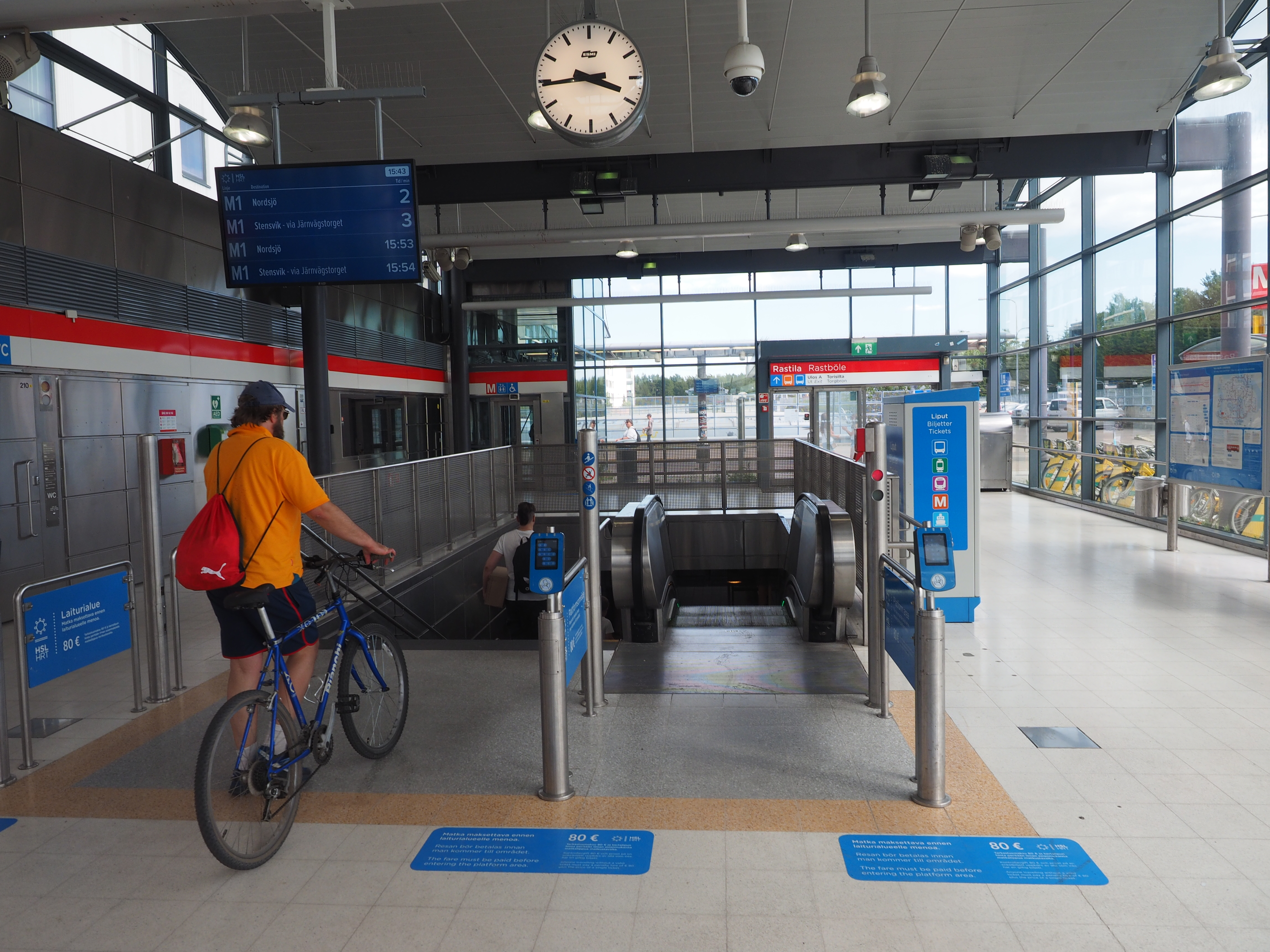
Interior of Rastila station

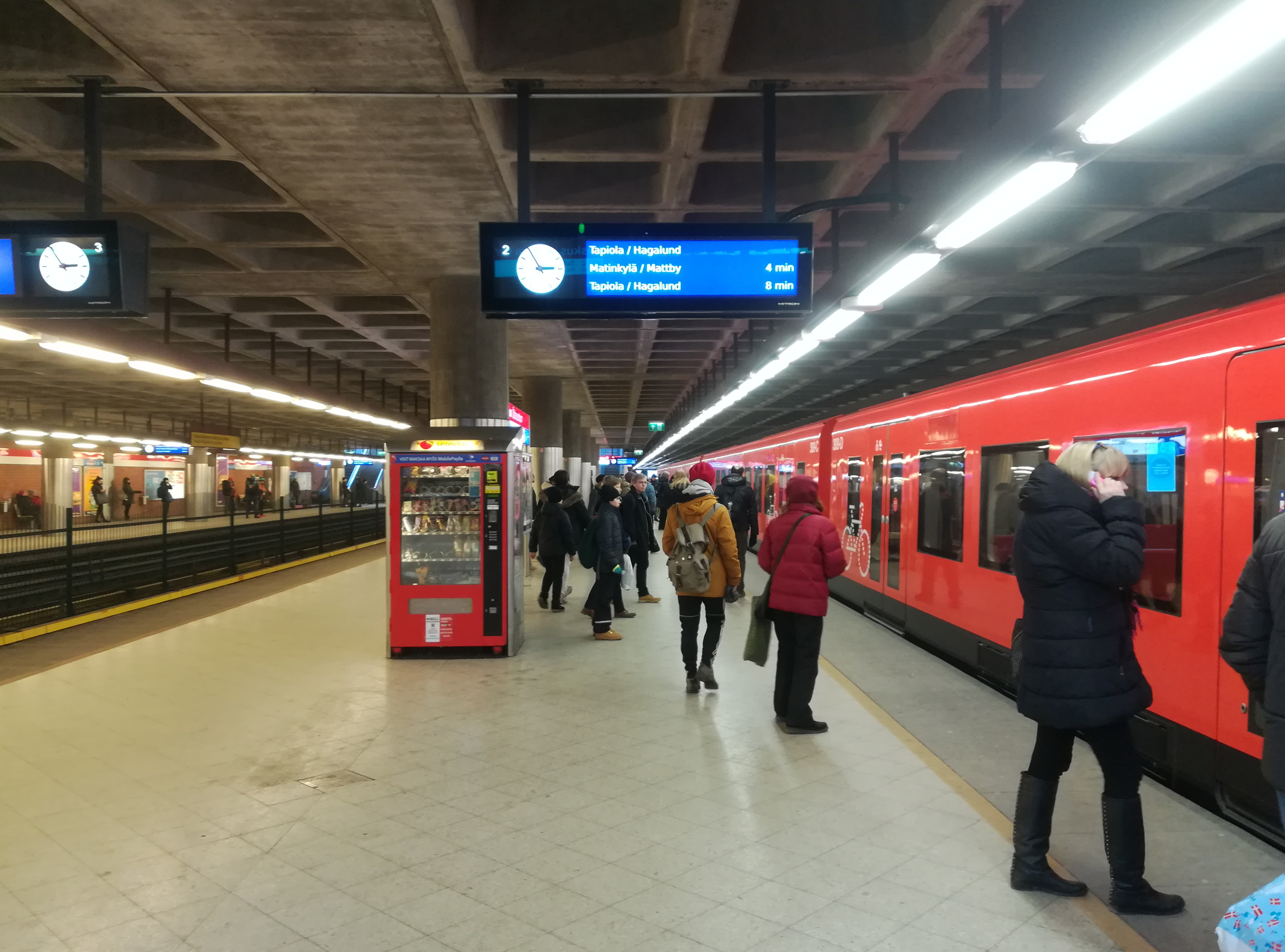
Passengers at Itäkeskus station

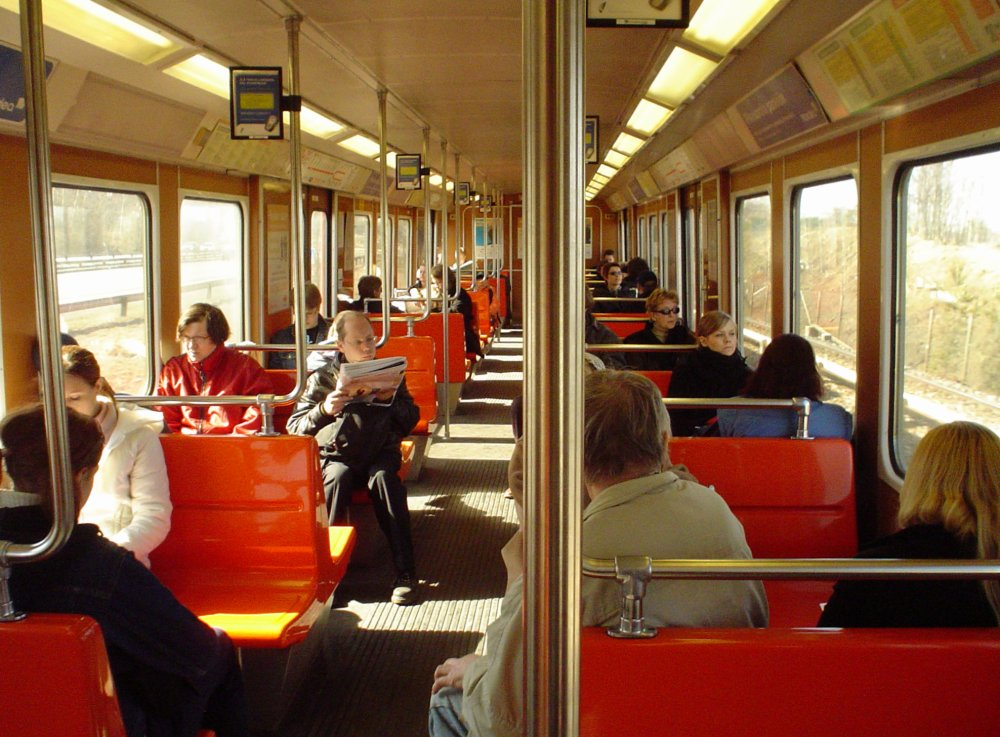
An interior view of a M100 train

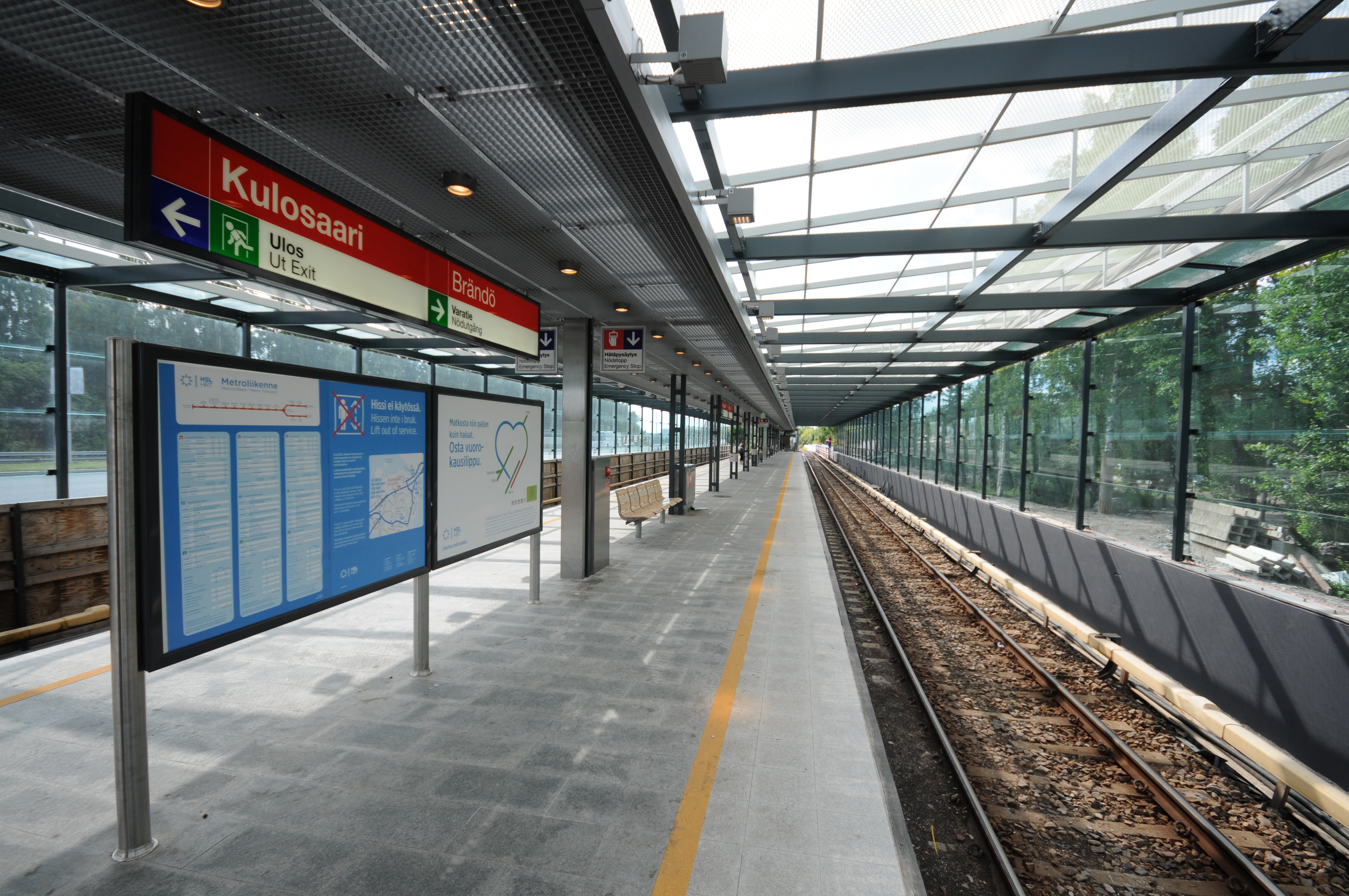
Kulosaari station

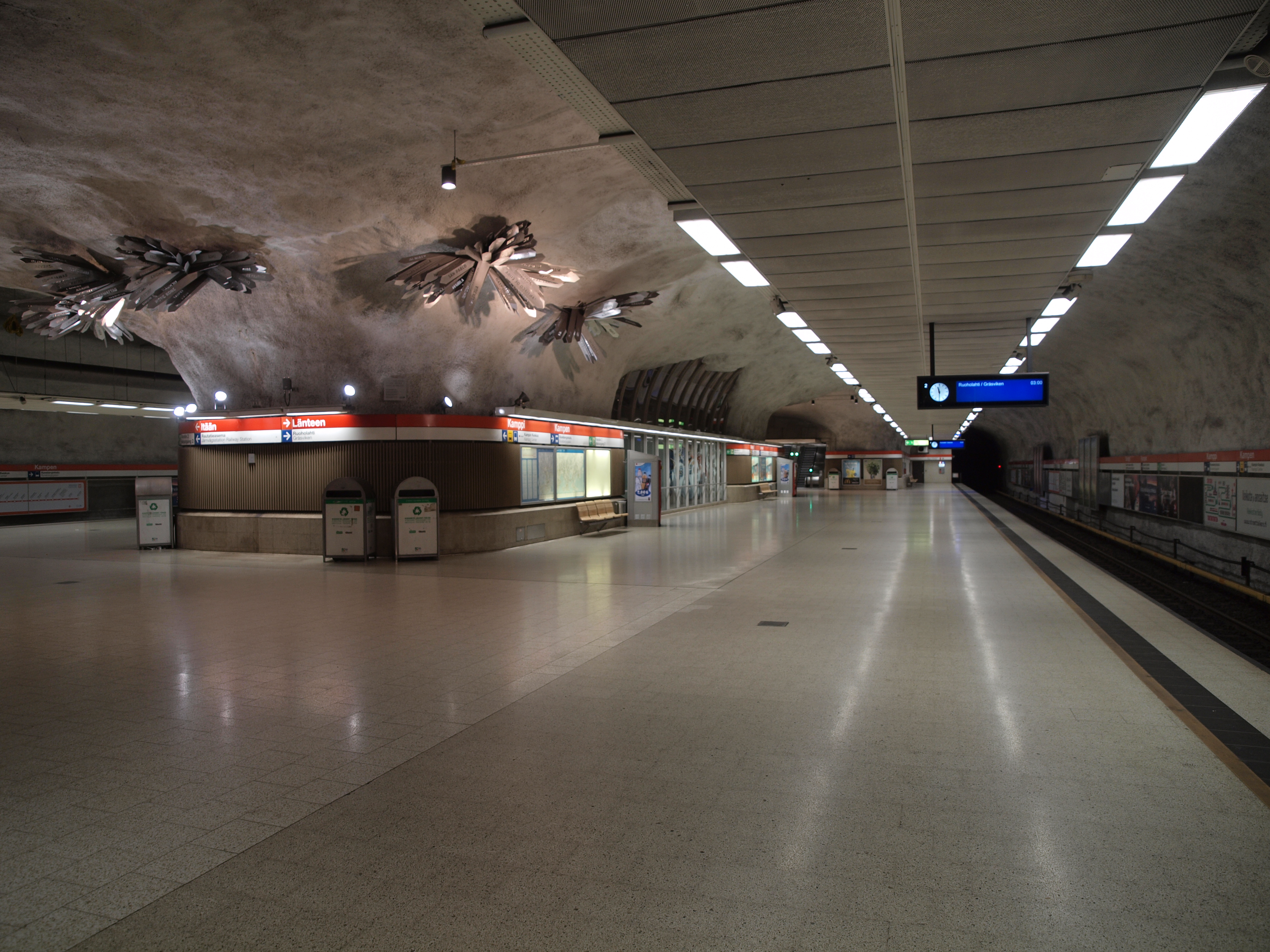
Kamppi station

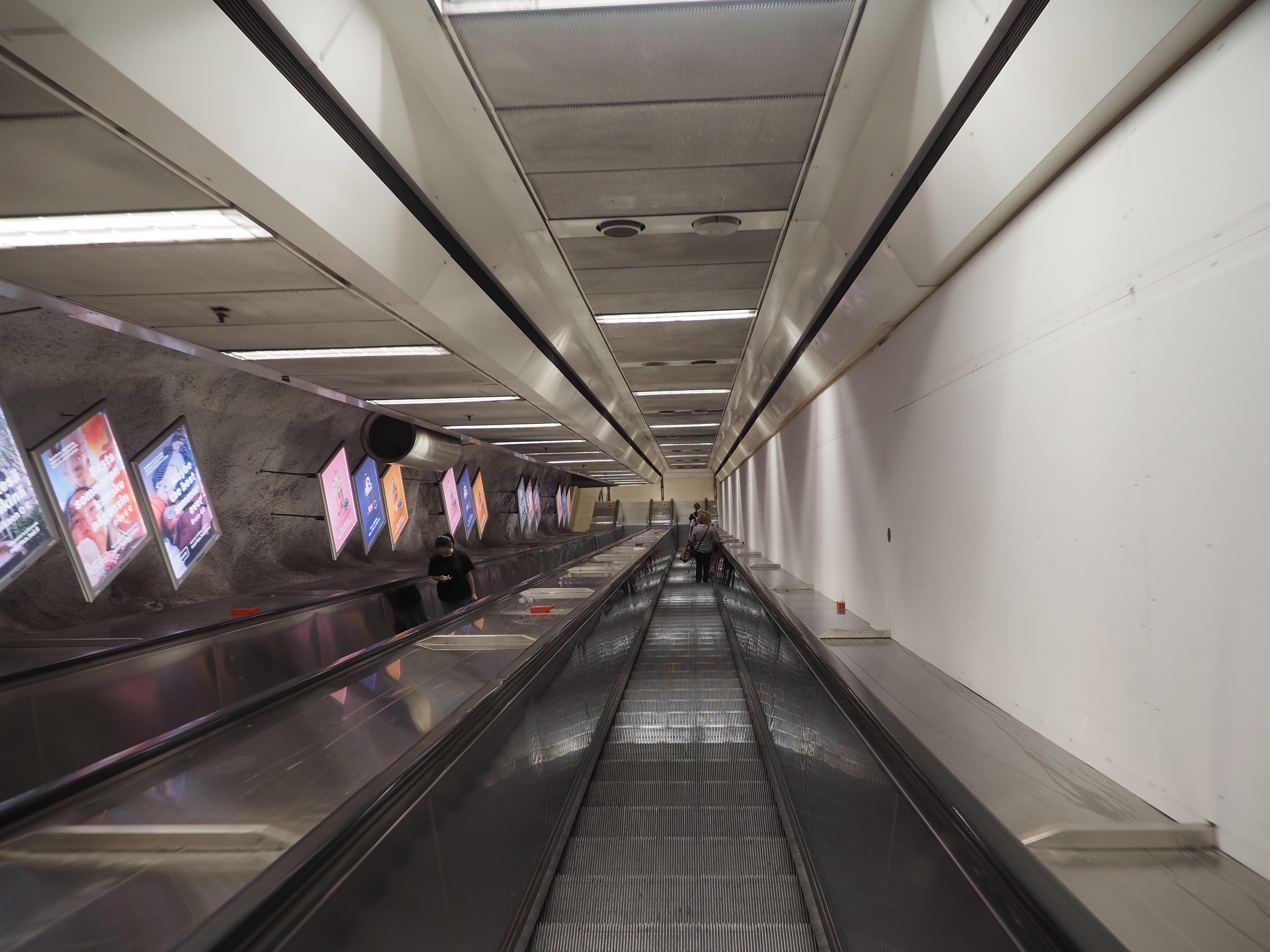
The escalators at Kamppi metro station were the longest escalators in Finland upon the completion of the station, but they have been since surpassed by the escalators at the Koivusaari metro station in 2017 and later by the escalators at the Finnoo metro station in 2022.

The Helsinki metro system consists of 30 stations. The stations are located along a Y shape, where the main part runs from the Matinkylä through the center of the city towards the eastern suburbs. The line forks at the Itäkeskus metro station. 22 of the network's stations are located below ground; all eight of those stations located above ground are in Helsinki.

From Kivenlahti to Sörnäinen the metro line runs in an underground tunnel, mostly at a depth of over twenty metres. On both sides of the island of Lauttasaari and at the Pitkäsilta bridge the tunnel runs through the seabed underneath the strait. At Sörnäinen the track rises overground and runs alongside the Itäväylä highway to Itäkeskus. The northern branch leading from Itäkeskus to Mellunmäki runs completely overground and mostly along the Kehä I and Kontulantie roads. Meanwhile the eastern branch leading to Vuosaari runs underneath Puotila in an underground tunnel but rises back overground before the Vuosaari bridge and runs along the street Vuotie in Vuosaari.

In Vuosaari, the metro track is connected to the Finnish Main Line via the Vuosaari harbour rail. The service track connection between the Vuosaari Harbour and the Vuosaari metro station is unelectrified and was completed in 2011. It replaced the previous service track connection between the Roihupelto depot and Oulunkylä.

Trains are generally operated as Kivenlahti–Vuosaari or Tapiola–Mellunmäki with some services running Kivenlahti–Mellunmäki in the early mornings and evenings. The rush-hour frequency of 24 tph in the central section between Tapiola and Itäkeskus was reduced to 20 tph from August 2022, due to a lack of drivers and rolling stock. All services stop at every station, and the names of the stations are announced in both Finnish and Swedish (with the exceptions of Central Railway Station, University of Helsinki and Aalto University, which are also announced in English).

The metro is designed as a core transport route, which means that extensive feeder bus transport links are provided between the stations and the surrounding districts. Taking a feeder bus to the metro is often the only option to get to the city centre from some districts. For example, since the construction of the metro, all daytime bus routes from the islands of Laajasalo terminate at the Herttoniemi metro station with no through routes from Laajasalo to the centre of Helsinki.

=== Lines ===
The Helsinki Metro is operated as two lines called M1 and M2, although these designations are not universally applied.

Line	Stretch	Stations	Distance	Travel time	Average distance between stations	Average speed
M1	Vuosaari–Kivenlahti	27	36.9 km (22.9 mi)	51 min	1,420 m (4,660 ft)	43.4 km/h (27.0 mph)
M2	Mellunmäki–Tapiola	19	25.7 km (16.0 mi)	34 min	1,428 m (4,685 ft)	45.4 km/h (28.2 mph)

=== List of stations ===
- Kivenlahti (Stensvik), below surface
- Espoonlahti (Esboviken), below surface
- Soukka (Sökö), below surface
- Kaitaa (Kaitans), below surface
- Finnoo (Finno), below surface
- Matinkylä (Mattby), below surface
- Niittykumpu (Ängskulla), below surface
- Urheilupuisto (Idrottsparken), below surface
- Tapiola (Hagalund), below surface
- Aalto University (Aalto-yliopisto / Aalto-universitetet), below surface
- Keilaniemi (Kägeludden), below surface
- Koivusaari (Björkholmen), below sea
- Lauttasaari (Drumsö), below surface
- Ruoholahti (Gräsviken), below surface
- Kamppi (Kampen), below surface
- Central Railway Station (Rautatientori / Järnvägstorget), below surface
- University of Helsinki (Helsingin yliopisto / Helsingfors universitet), formerly Kaisaniemi (Kajsaniemi), below surface
- Hakaniemi (Hagnäs), below surface
- Sörnäinen (Sörnäs), below surface
- Kalasatama (Fiskehamnen), above surface
- Kulosaari (Brändö), above surface
- Herttoniemi (Hertonäs), below surface
- Siilitie (Igelkottsvägen), above surface
- Itäkeskus (Östra centrum), below surface
- Myllypuro (Kvarnbäcken), above surface
- Kontula (Gårdsbacka), above surface
- Mellunmäki (Mellungsbacka), above surface
- Puotila (Botby gård), below surface
- Rastila (Rastböle), above surface
- Vuosaari (Nordsjö), above surface

=== Bridges ===
There are several bridges along the metro line which came in need of basic repairs in the 2000s. The bridge repairs have caused long breaks in traffic and have been difficult to complete.

In 2024 the bridges between Kontula and Mellunmäki were renovated over a traffic break taking over two months.

In 2021 the Kipparlahti bridge was renovated by moving a new bridge module with a length of 69 metres and weighing 2400 tonnes in place of the old bridge which had been dismantled.

In 2012 one of the largest bridge move operations in Finland was performed when a new bridge 130 metres long and weighing 2600 tonnes was moved into place in connection of construction at the centre of Kalasatama.

=== Accessibility ===
Some stations are located above ground level, making the metro system more friendly to passengers with mobility problems. Sub-surface stations have no stairs from the ticket hall to the platform, and one can access them from the street level via escalators or lifts. The trains themselves have no steps, and the floors of the trains are level with the platforms, with the gap between the two being just a couple of centimetres. Mobility scooters are not allowed, but trams have wheelchair accessible floors. A 2016 study found the metro trains and station "fully accessible independently or with a helper" but noted that the elevator to the metro had no signalization and required a detour to reach, along with being constantly dirty. It also considered the Kamppi station signs to be "adequate but inconsistent", noting one elevator without braille instructions.

=== Ticketing ===
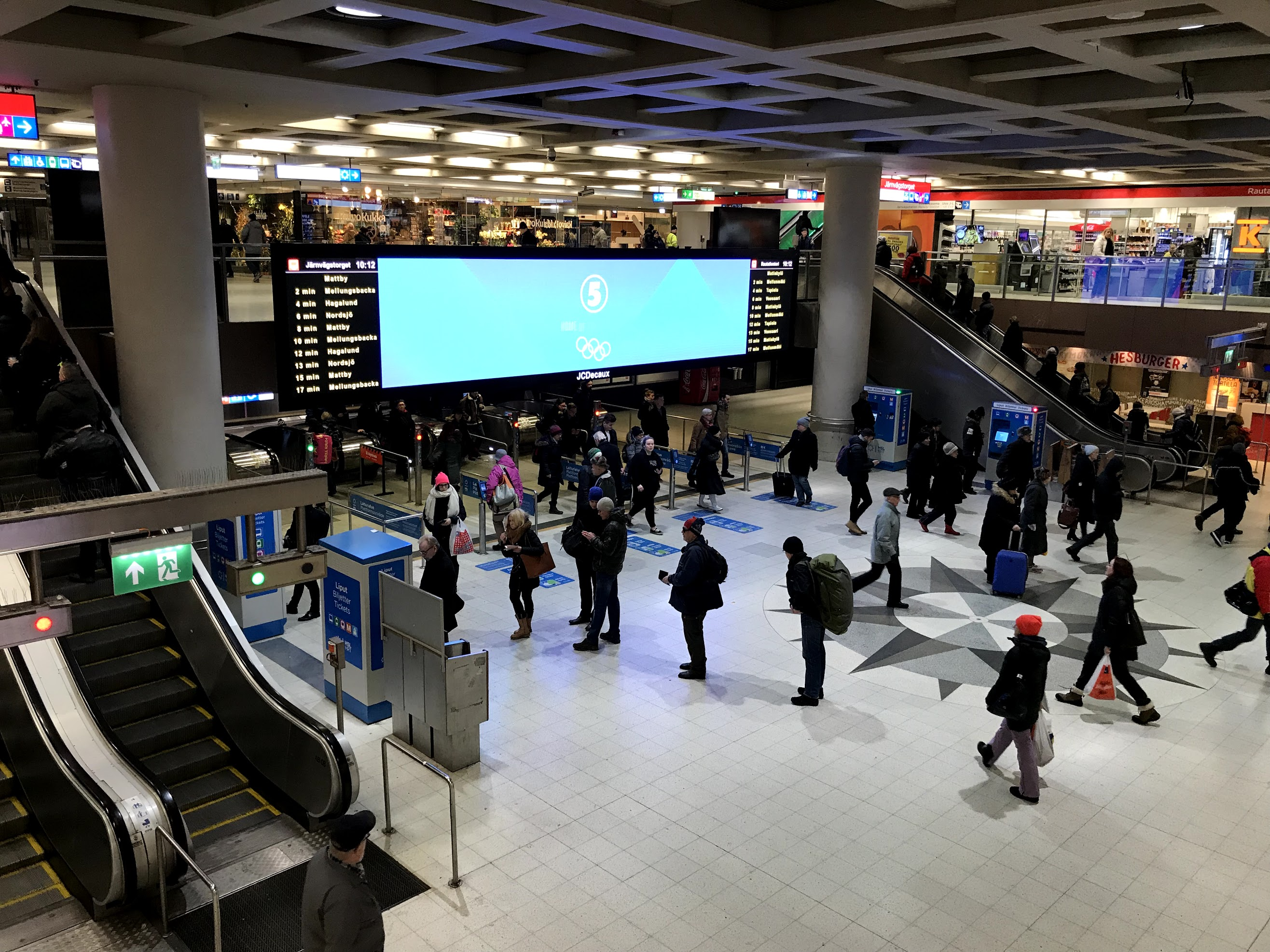
Entrance to the metro station near the Helsinki Central railway station

The ticketing scheme on the Metro is consistent with other forms of transport inside the city of Helsinki, managed by the Helsinki Regional Transport Authority (HSL) agency. The HSL travel card (matkakortti) is the most commonly used ticket, which can be paid either per journey or for a period of two weeks to one year. The metro stations between Koivusaari and Kulosaari lie within zone A. The stations between Keilaniemi and Matinkylä and from Herttoniemi to Mellunmäki or Vuosaari lie within the zone B, and from Finnoo to Kivenlahti in zone C, so an ABC ticket covers the entire system. Single tickets can be bought from ticket machines at the stations (except for the stations between Finnoo and Kivenlahti, which have no ticket machines) or via the HSL mobile app. A single ticket can be used to change to any other form of transport inside the HSL area with the validity time based on the number of zones purchased. There are no gates to the platforms; a proof-of-payment system is used instead.

=== Safety ===
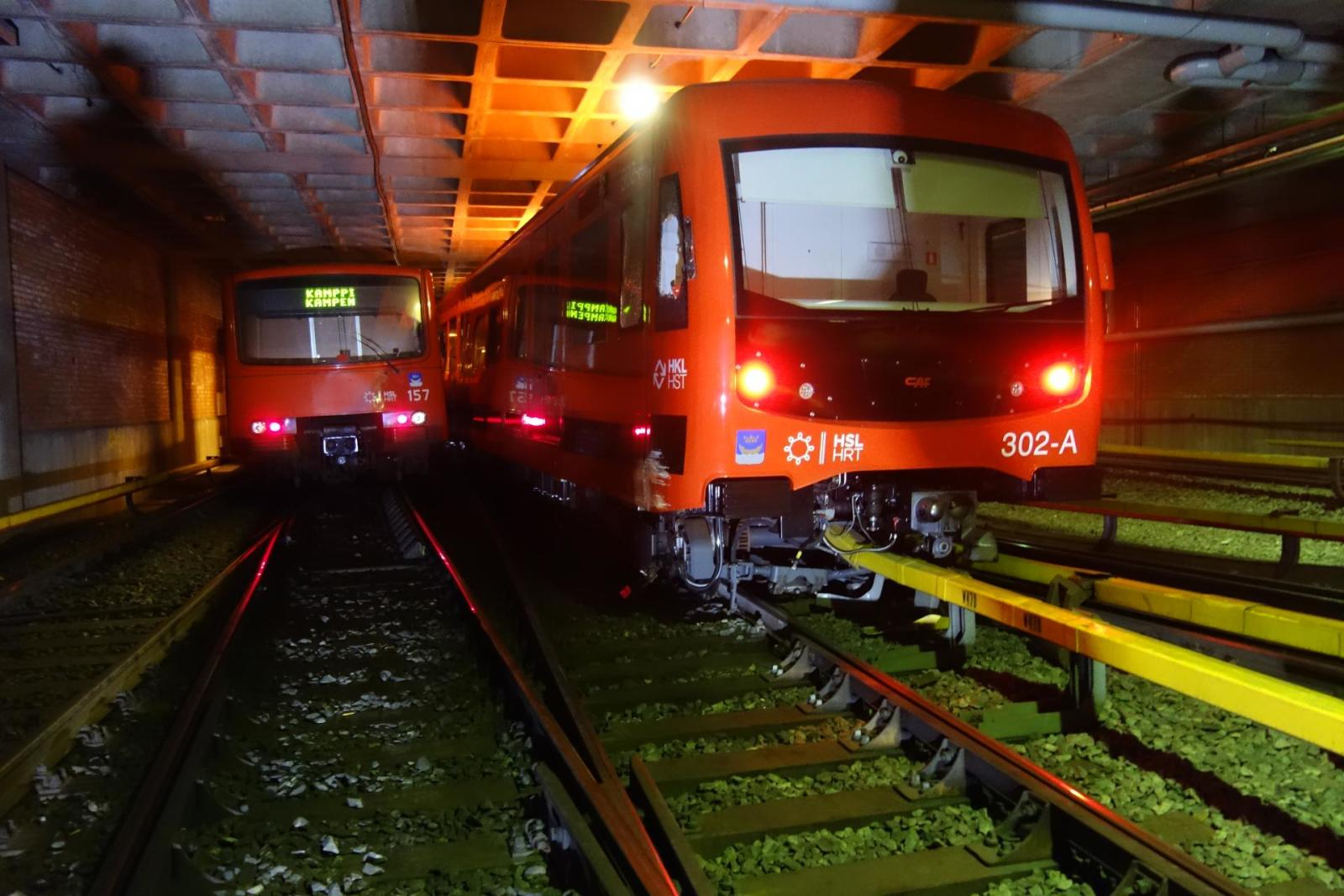
Two metro trains collided in 2016 near the Itäkeskus metro station.

Passenger safety instructions are inside train carriages above the doors and stations at ticket hall and platforms. These instructions direct passengers to use emergency phones and also include an emergency phone number to traffic center. Emergency stop handles at platforms discharge traction current and set nearby signals to danger. These handles can be used for example in case a person or an animal falls on the track, wanders there unauthorised or is trapped between the train doors. There are emergency brake handles inside the carriage next to the door.

Especially for people with visual impairments, all platforms have a yellow line marking the safe area on platform. Additionally, there are fire extinguishers on trains and in stations.

In early November 2009, the Rautatientori metro station suffered large-scale water damages and it was estimated to be out of use for half a year. The repairs went quicker than expected and the station returned to use on 15 February 2010 except for the elevators.

According to a survey by the city of Helsinki the metro is seen as the least safe form of public transport, and in 2007 half of the female respondents in the survey said they felt a certain unsafety in evening times.

There was a collision at the Helsinki Metro on 27 July 2016 when two metro trains collided with each other at Itäkeskus metro station in early morning when the trains were in test and practice use. No one was injured in the accident. The Finnish Safety Investigation Authority gave five safety recommendations about improving the safety on the metro because of the incident.

== Technology ==
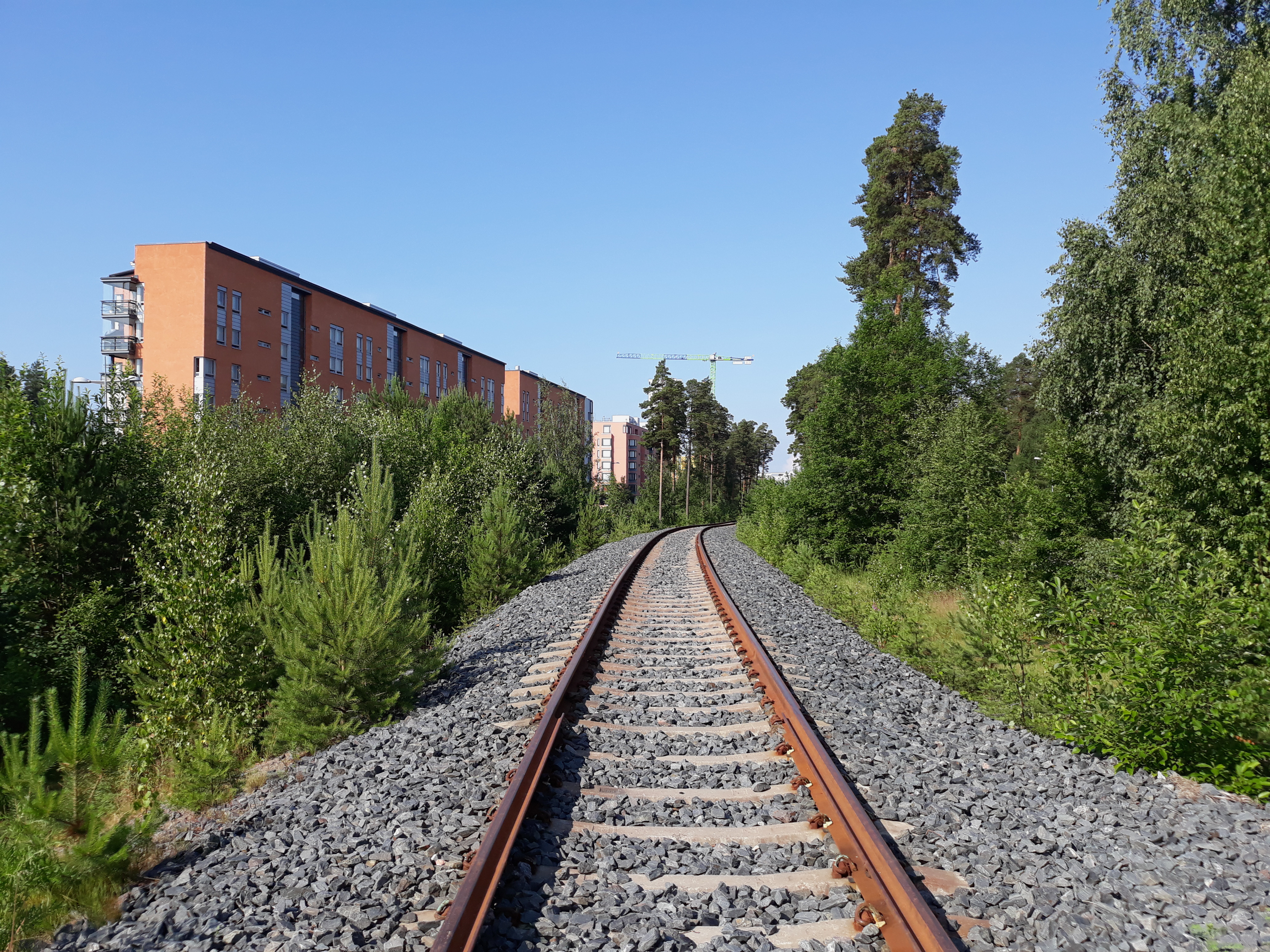
The connection track between the Vuosaari metro station and the Vuosaari Harbour

The Helsinki Metro consists of twenty-five stations on two lines, and the total length of the track is about 35 kilometres. Although the metro traffic was moved from the Helsinki City Transport to the Metropolitan Area Transport Ltd in February 2022, the Helsinki City Transport is still currently responsible for the traffic on the metro and owns the infrastructure and rolling stock.

From 1999 to 2015 HKL-Metroliikenne, a subunit of the Helsinki City Transport was fully responsible for maintaining the metro infrastructure with about 250 employees. The Helsinki City Transport traffic subunit, founded in the start of the year 2016, is responsible for the traffic. The infrastructure and rolling stock subunit is responsible for controlling the infrastructure and rolling stock. The maintenance subunit is responsible for maintaining the infrastructure and the rolling stock.

=== Rolling stock ===
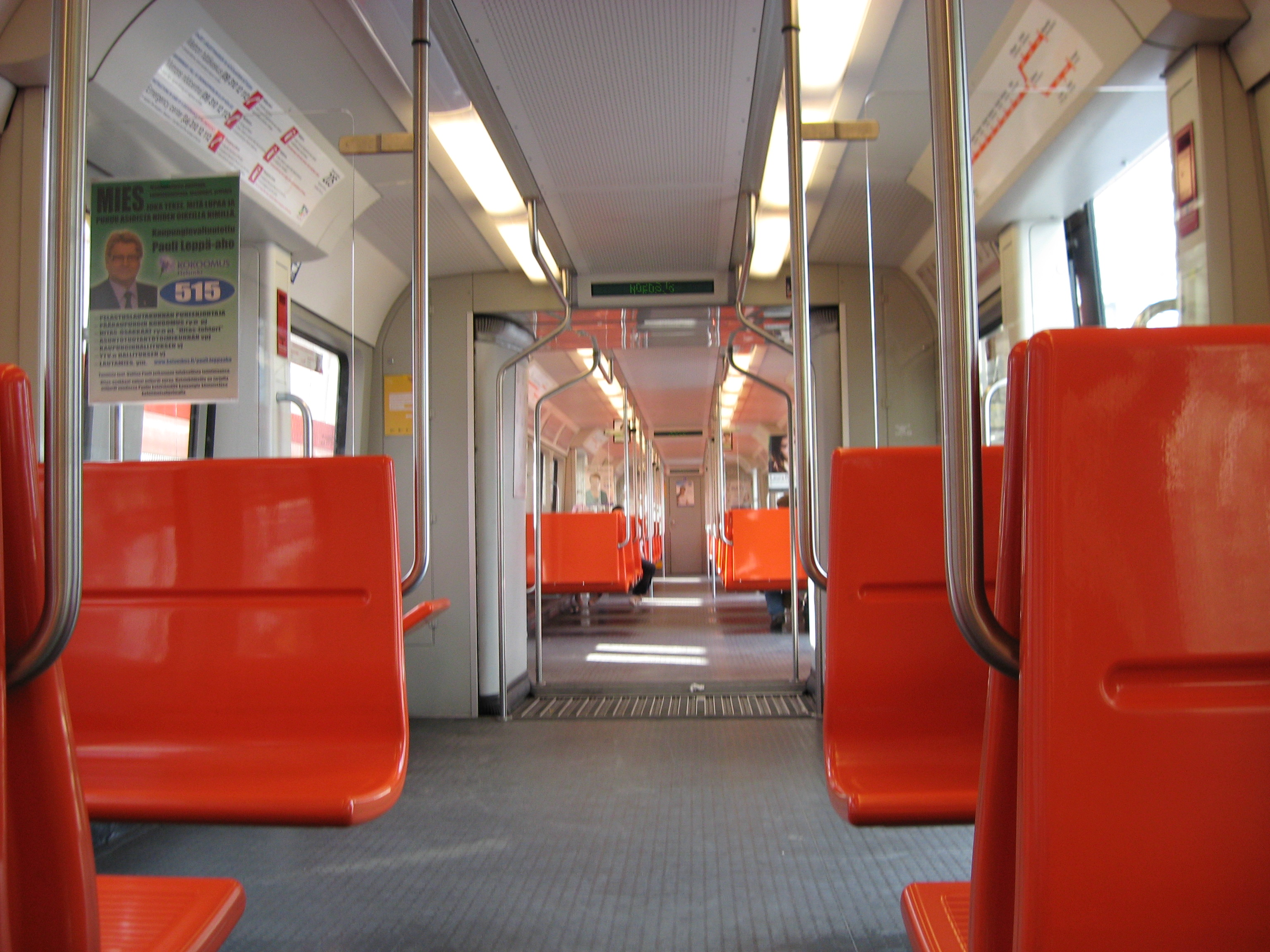
M200 interior

The 1522 mm track gauge on the metro is almost the same as the 1524 mm gauge used on the main railway network in Finland. The metro platforms are higher than the railway platforms. The 750V DC current is drawn from a bottom-contact third rail alongside the running rails. The M200 trains also have a reserved place for a current connection on their roofs, allowing for a possible metro extension where the power lines run above the track.

The variable-frequency drive on odd-numbered carriages on coupled trains transforms direct current into alternating current to regulate the speed on the induction motor. Metro carriages are also built slightly lighter than carriages on regional trains as they have to accelerate quickly and stop often.

Since the opening of the Länsimetro extension, trains are always formed with 4 carriages.

=== Depots and facilities ===
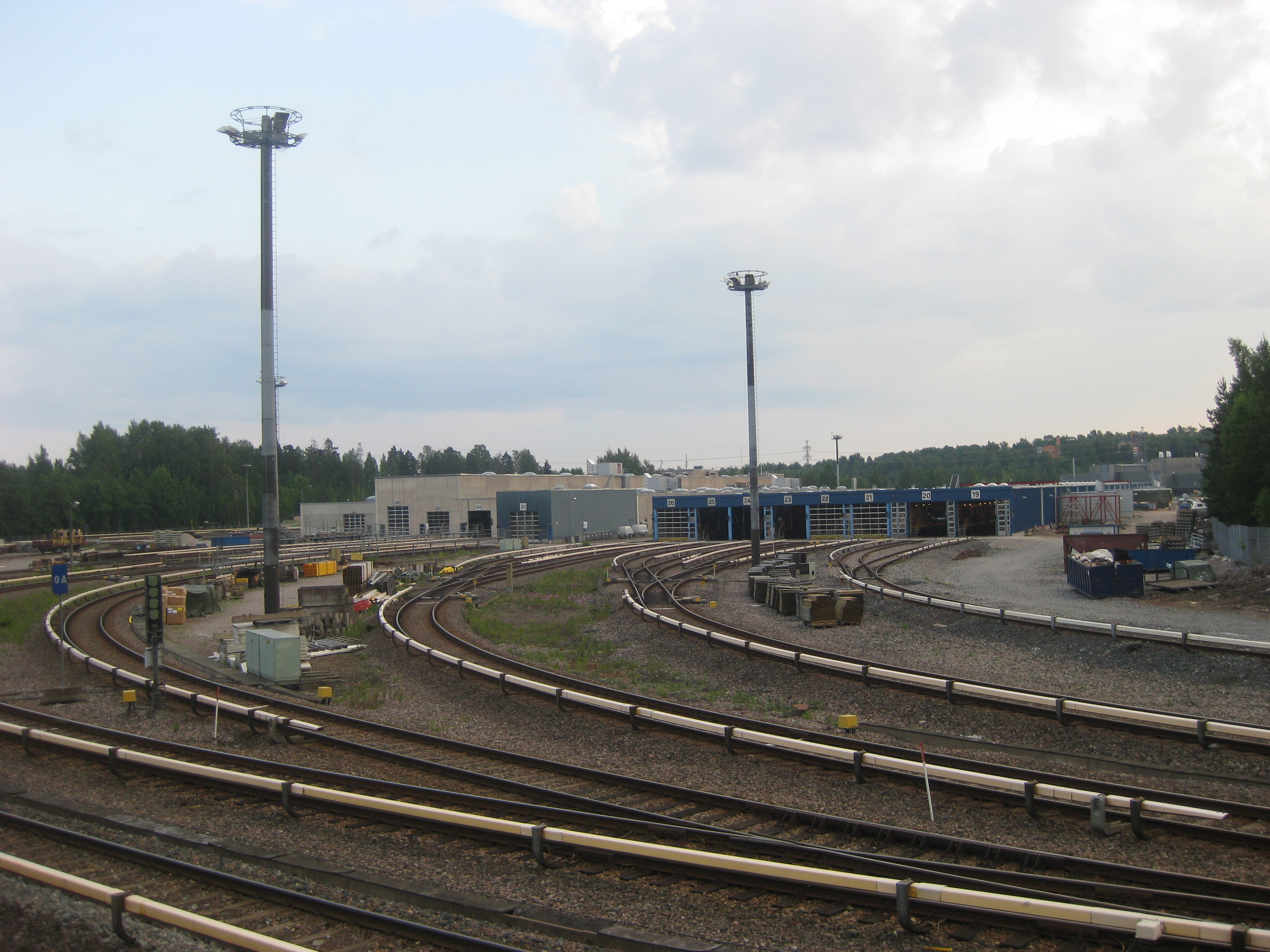
Inside Roihupelto depot, July 2010

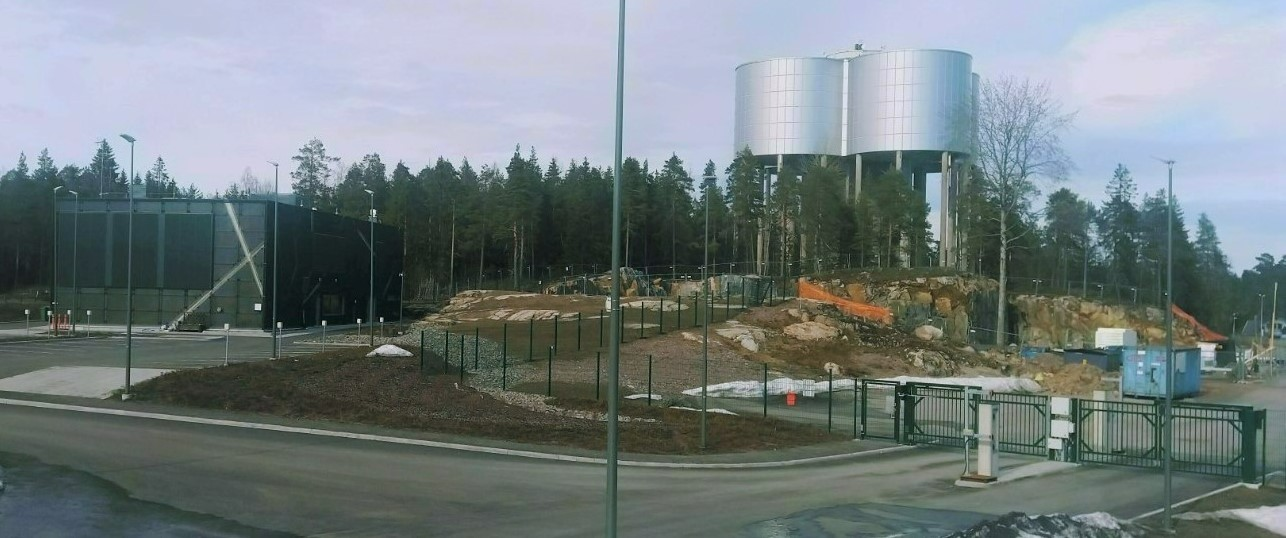
Entrance to Sammalvuori depot, April 2022

The original maintenance and storage depot for the metro system is at Roihupelto metro depot, between the stations of Siilitie and Itäkeskus. The depot is connected to the metro line from both directions, with a third, central, platform at Itäkeskus used for empty services and during times of disruption. Both warm and cold storage is provided at the depot, to avoid having to pre-heat trains before service in the cold winters.

Behind the Roihupelto depot is the metro test track, allowing testing at speeds of up to 100 kilometres per hour (62 mph); the far end of this test-track was until 2012 connected via the non-electrified 5 km (3.1 mi) long Herttoniemi harbour railway and then to the VR main line at Oulunkylä railway station. Both the metro and railways share interoperable gauges. The old access line was mostly along the first two-thirds of the old Herttoniemi harbour railway. Through the area of Viikki, this single line had street running since 2002.

In 2012 the old depot link was closed and partially removed when a new 2 km (1.2 mi) metro link line was built from the then present end at Vuosaari metro station, to the electrified 19 km (12 mi) long Vuosaari harbour railway in the new Vuosaari harbour. From 2019 the route of the old link line was redeveloped to form part of the Jokeri light rail line which was opened on 21 October 2023.

The new underground Sammalvuori metro depot located between Kivenlahti and Espoonlahti stations, opened along with the second stage of Länsimetro on 3 December 2022.

=== Traffic and traffic control ===
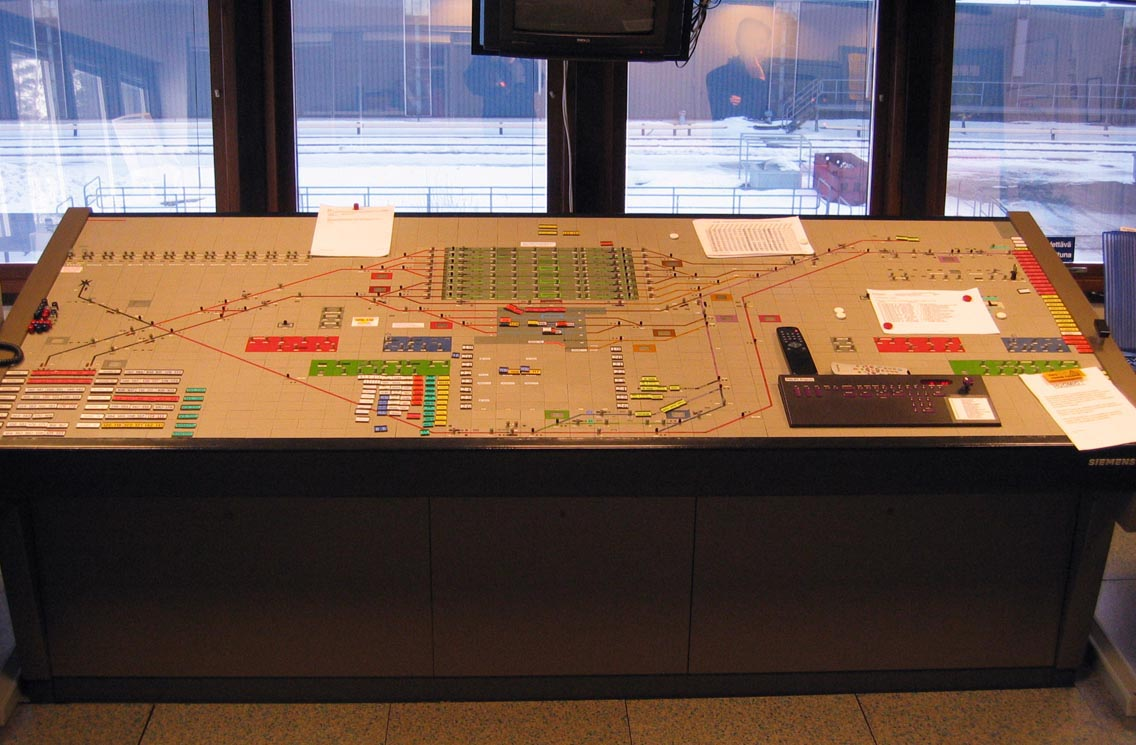
A Siemens SpDrS60 system at the metro depot.

The Helsinki Metro is technically a railway network, even though its stations are close together and the train interval is short (2.5 to 15 minutes). The metro uses mostly the same rules as the main railway network: drivers cannot choose the rails they drive on themselves, but instead the rails are assigned by a traffic controller. Drivers also cannot start to drive without permission from the traffic controller. These permissions are usually given with optic railway signals, but sometimes also verbally on the VIRVE network or in exceptional cases via a GSM mobile phone. This is in contrast to the trams in Helsinki, where the driver takes full responsibility for driving the tram.

The principle of the safety device equipment is similar to that on the main railway network: the track is divided into fixed-length intervals guided by a master signal.There are usually two to four intervals between two consecutive stations. Each interval consists of many track electrical circuits. The axle of a passing train closes the circuit, charging the interval covered by it. It is not possible to give a signal permitting drive to an interval with a charged circuit - this prevents trains from colliding.

The traffic control system on the metro differs slightly from the automatic train control system used on the main railway network in that the control system on the metro is based on magnets placed at certain points (between the rails at main signals). There is a sensor on the bottom of the train beneath the driver's cabin for this magnet. These magnets deactivate when a signal gives permission to drive. In case a train passes a red signal (with the magnet active), the magnet launches an emergency brake on the train. As such, the control system does not in principle prevent the driver from a passing a red signal, but in practice this leads to an automatic brake. In addition, there are speed regulation points equipped with such magnets at four places on the track, where the magnet activates and launches an emergency brake if the train passes the speed regulation point at the magnet with too high speed. On the main railway network, traffic control is implemented with point sensors on the track (balises) which transmit information about upcoming signals to the traffic control system in the locomotive, preventing the driver from driving at too high speed or passing red signals.

The routes on the metro track are handled with computer equipment manufactured by the Finnish company Mipro and a control system built on top of them (ATS). This equipment was taken into use in two phases: the Länsimetro in spring 2016 and the rest of the metro in February 2019. The control is centralised to the metro traffic control room in Herttoniemi. The continuously staffed separate control room at the metro depot taken into use in 1982 was shut down after 37 years on 16 March 2019 at 07:00 in the morning, when control was transferred to Herttoniemi.

The original control systems from the 1980s were four relay systems of the model Siemens SpDrS 60 which could control about six kilometres of track each. These systems were located at the Hakaniemi, Herttoniemi, Kontula and Vuosaari stations. All four systems were remotely controlled from the central control room in Hakaniemi through a computer user interface (Alcatel SEL L90) from 1993. There was also a similar control system at the Roihupelto metro depot. These systems were changed into Siemens SICAS computer-based interlocking systems in December 2012. In normal conditions, routine functions on the traffic control have been automatised so that the computer control system (ATS) automatically requests passage for each train to the next track interval from the traffic control system according to the timetable. In case of a disturbance in traffic, traffic controllers can manually set the passage on the graphical user interface of the system.

The signal systems and the signals on the metro are mostly the same as on the main railway network. The biggest difference is that the master signal can give five classes of signals: "Stop" (red light), "Drive" (green light), "Drive sn 35" (yellow and green light), "Switch signal" meaning drive on the charged track sn 20 (yellow light) and "Exceptional signal" meaning exceptional permission to pass a "Stop" signal (red and white light). The preliminary signal is used for two signals: "Wait drive" (two green lights) and "Wait other than drive" (two yellow lights). There are no separate safety signals or track signals on the metro track because their purpose is fulfilled with the master signals.

== Metro trains ==
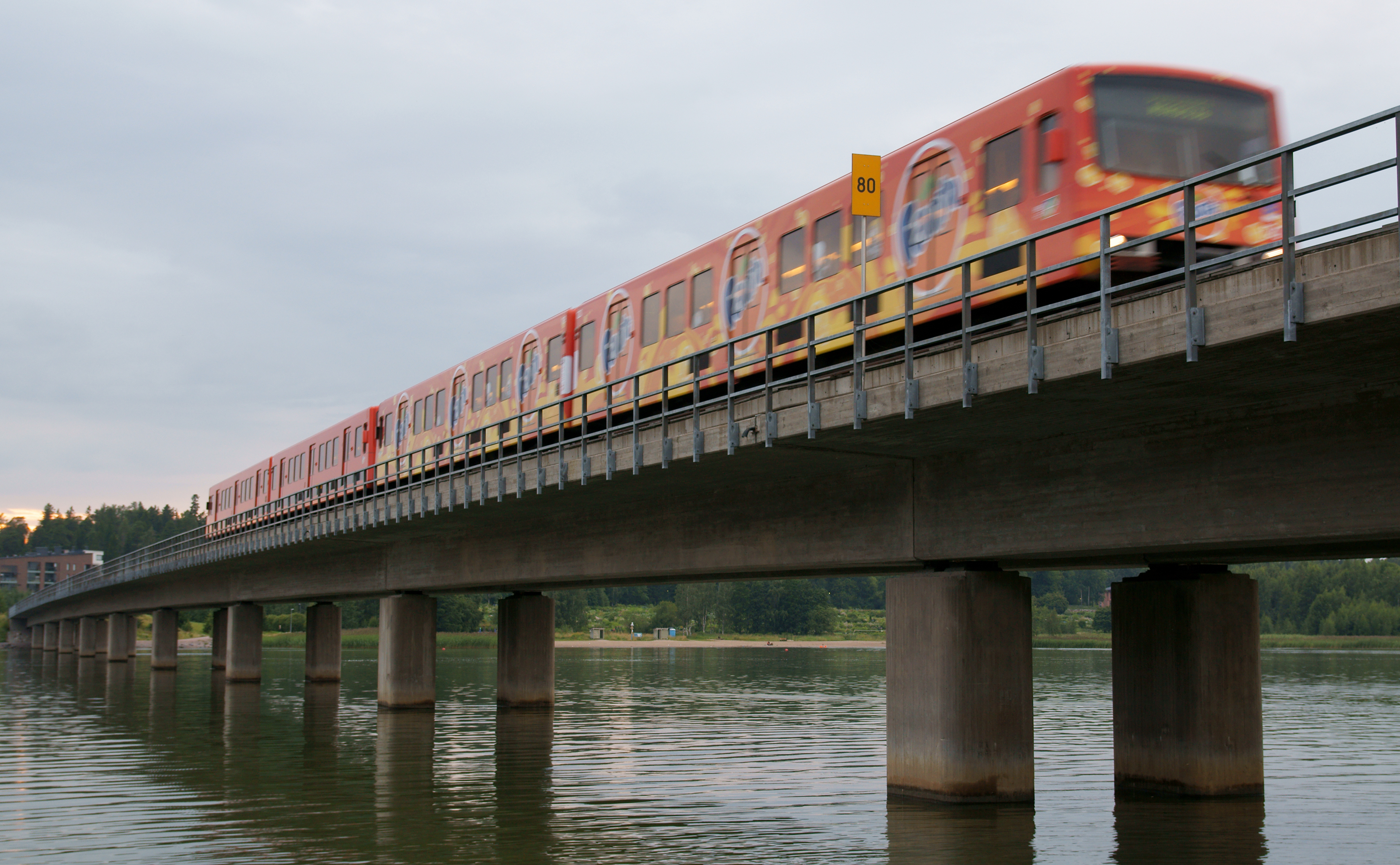
A metro train on the Vuosaari metro bridge between the Rastila and Puotila stations.

There are three different types of rolling stock in service on the system as of 2026. The first trains adopted on the system consisted of the M100 series that was built by Strömberg in the late 1970s to the early 1980s. A total of 42 trains were built, with numbers 101 to 184. Trains 107 to 184 were renovated with the last train undergoing renovation in 2009. The passenger information, door system and interior were fixed. The so-called "beak trains", meaning the oldest trains 101 to 106, were not renovated but were instead the first trains to be discontinued.

The newer M200 series was built by Bombardier in Germany and has been in service since 2000; each set is composed of two cars connected by an open gangway. The trains entered into use on 2001 beginning on 4 June. There are a total of 12 trains with the numbers 201 to 224.

In 2007 the transport bureau of Helsinki decided to order a new series of trains. The latest version, the M300 series, entered service in 2016, built by CAF. A further 5 M300 units were built in 2022 for the extension to Kivenlahti. These new trains will be needed in the future because of expansion of the metro network and tightening tram intervals. Helsinki ordered 20 trains with an option for 20 more. The delivery was delayed because CAF had to wait for technical information from Siemens which was responsible for automating the metro trains.

Unlike the first two series, the M300 trains operate as 4-car sets with open gangways and were designed to run without drivers, though since the cancellation of the automation project, they retain their temporary cabs.

Line speed of the system is 70 kilometres per hour (43 mph) inside the tunnels and 80 kilometres per hour (50 mph) on the open portion of the network. Points have a maximum speed of 35 kilometres per hour (22 mph), with some sets near termini having a maximum speed of 60 kilometres per hour (37 mph). Technically the M200 and M100 series have a maximum speed of 120 kilometres per hour (75 mph) and 100 kilometres per hour (62 mph), respectively, but they are electrically limited to 80 kilometres per hour (50 mph).

All axles of the metro train have drive and each of them has its separate motor. Each carriage has two bogies with two axles each. Thus one full M100 series train unit has eight motors with a power of 125 kW each, powering the train unit with a total of one megawatt. The total motor power of a full metro train with three carriages is thus three megawatts. There are three braking systems in a metro train: an electric brake, an air brake and a rail brake. The electric brake is used to decelerate the train and it works by turning the drive motors into generators feeding the electric current into special brake resistors, with the generated heat being used to warm the train interior in cold weather. The air brake is used to stop the train from a slow speed and it also acts as a back-up for the electric brake. The magnetic rail brakes between the bogie wheels are meant for emergency braking.

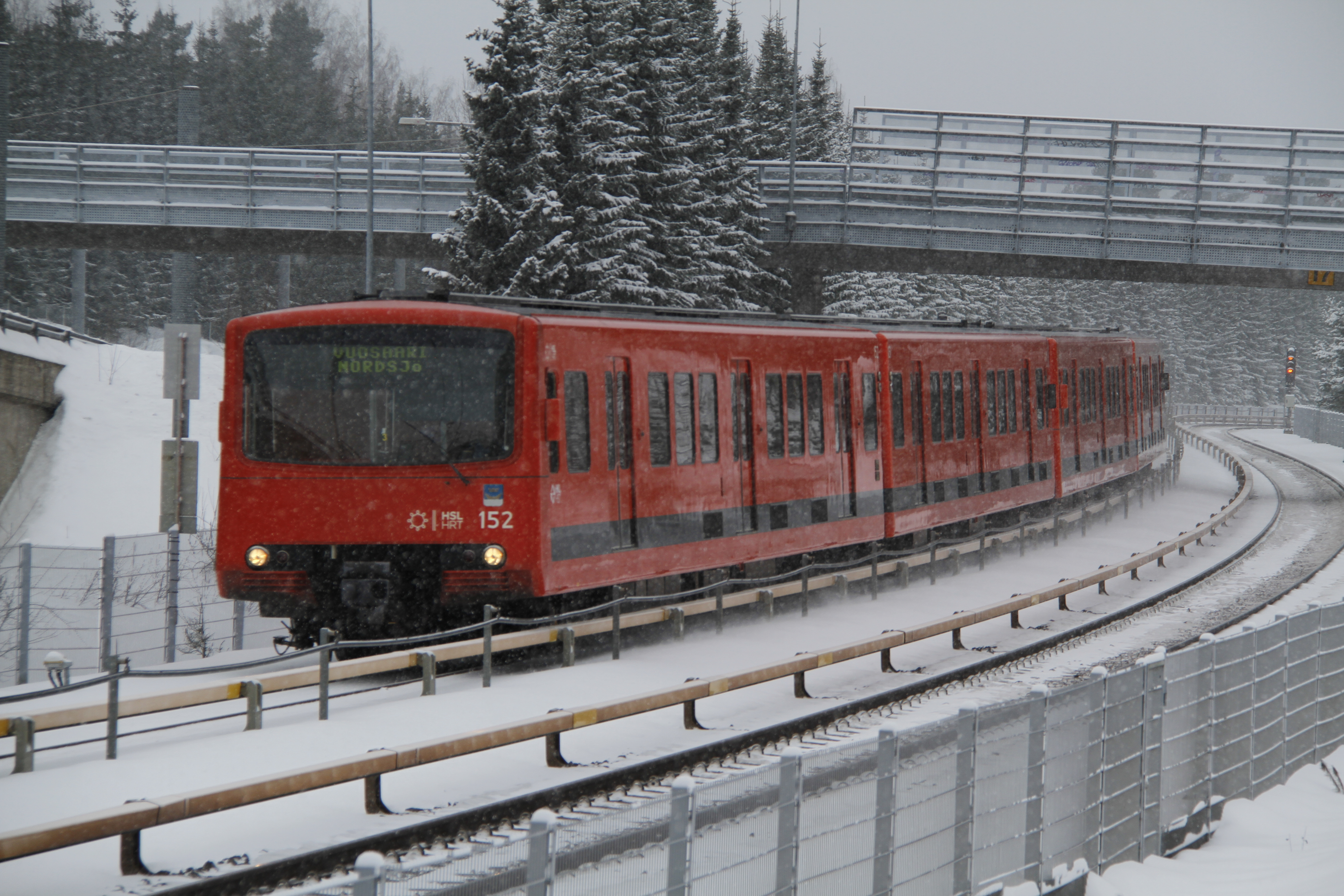
M100

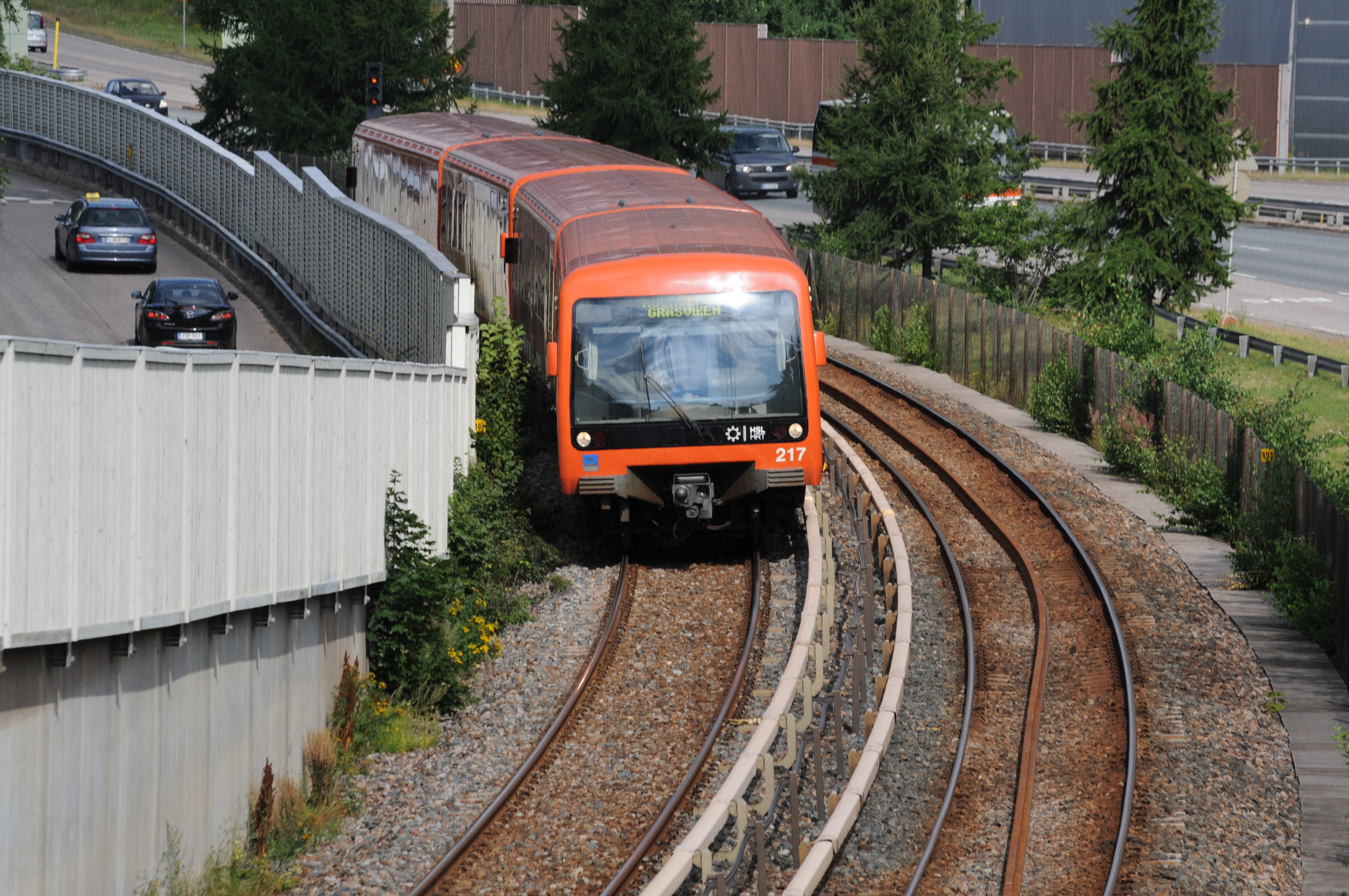
M200

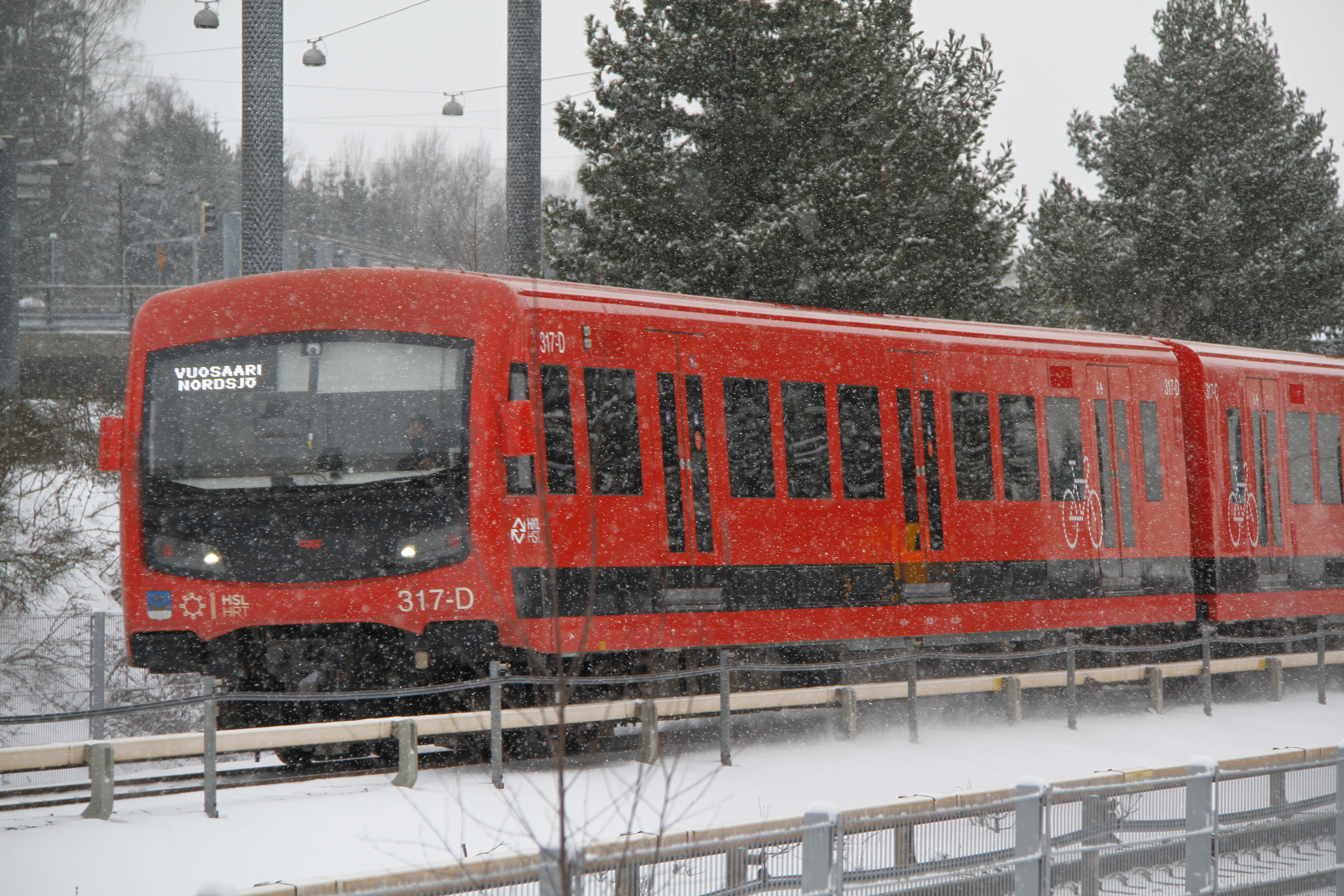
M300

== Passenger information ==
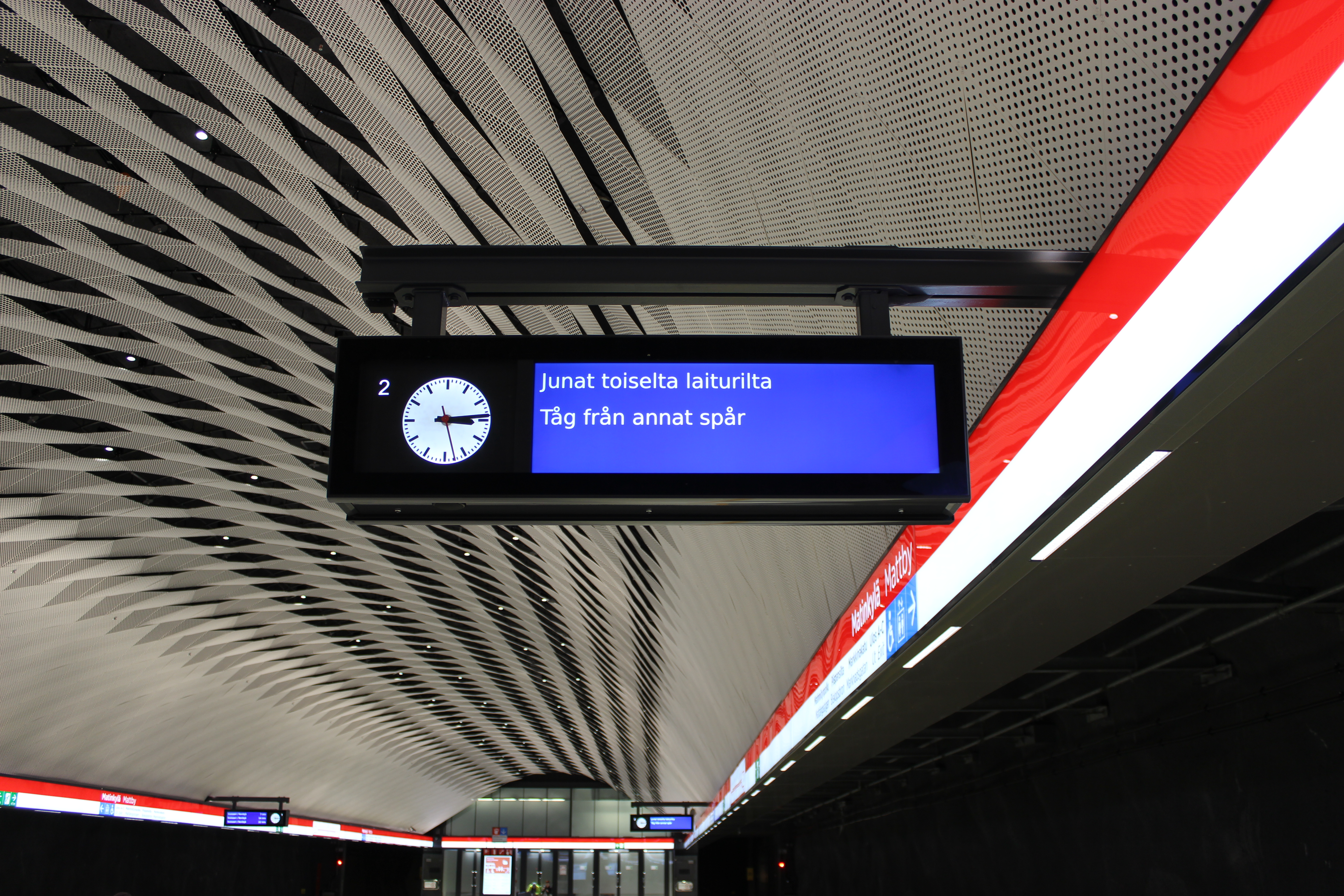
A timetable display on the platform at the Matinkylä metro station.

Passenger information is given with visible and audible signals. The simplest of these are the signs at the stations with the name of the station in Finnish and Swedish; three stations - the Rautatientori, University of Helsinki and Aalto University stations - also have the name in English. There are tram network maps on the trains and on the stations. The maps on the stations also show the direction of the track in regard to the map and a white ball at the location of the station.

The timetable displays on the stations show the destination of the next train in two languages and the remaining time until departure with an accuracy of one minute. The departure time of the train is based on real-time information about the locations of the trains.

There are electronic destination displays on both ends of all trains showing the name of the destination in Finnish and Swedish (and also in English if the destination has an English name). In some trains, only the front display is switched on while in some trains, both displays are switched on. Some trains have displays also on the sides and some trains have signs also showing the line number of the train.

It is also possible to make manual announcements of traffic control for example if a traffic accident or disturbance occurs. At Itäkeskus metro station there are automatic announcements in Finnish and Swedish about trains travelling east because of the Iiris centre of visually impaired people located near the station. There are one-time announcements about the next station on the metro trains when the train is approaching the station. The Finnish voice actress Carla Rindell has acted as the voice of the announcements. Today there are also LED displays on all metro trains showing all the automatic announcements (for example the name of the next station) in Finnish, Swedish and English either by a scrolling message or as static text alternating between Finnish, Swedish and English. There are also announcements when the metro train is at the station and shortly after departure from the station showing the line number and destination of the train in Finnish, Swedish and English (if the destination station has an English name) either by a scrolling message or as static text. It is also possible for the metro train driver to make announcements on the whole train (or on individual carriages in the renovated M100 trains) for example when a traffic disturbance occurs.

== Travel on the metro ==
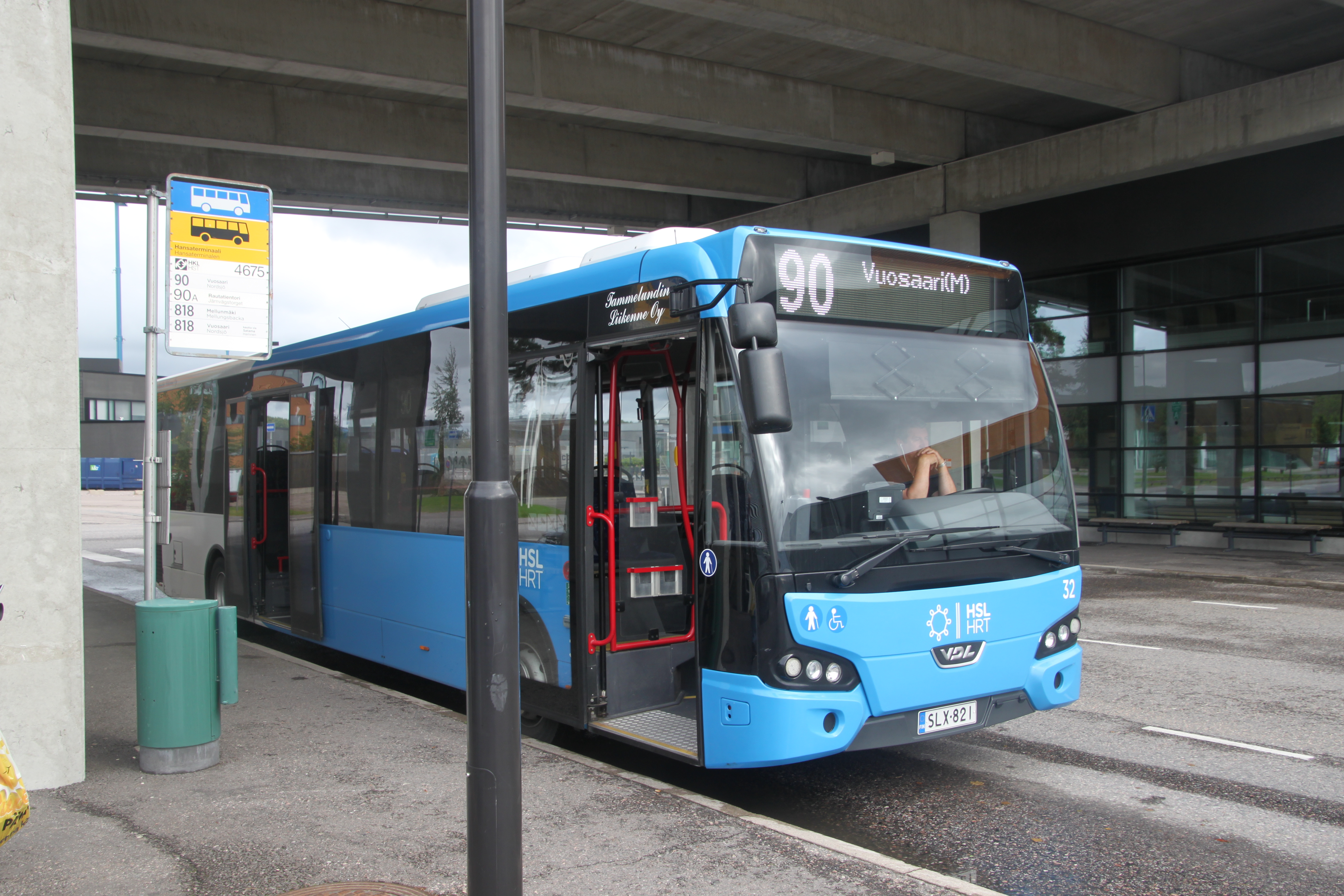
A bus on line 90 at its terminus stop at the Vuosaari Harbour.

The metro stations west of Kalasatama are located underground and can be reached from the street level usually by escalators or by elevator. The metro runs in the cities of Helsinki and Espoo. Single tickets can be bought from automats at the station or by the Helsinki Regional Transport's smartphone app.

The stations have elevators for people with limited mobility and for people travelling with prams or bicycles. Some of the elevators at the Helsinki Metro run diagonally up and down alongside the escalators, which is a rare occurrence in the scope of the entire world. The high metro platforms make the trains accessible because the floor of the train carriages is at the same level as the platform.

In eastern Helsinki the stations were built on a tight budget except for the newer Vuosaari branch. The old stations in eastern Helsinki are modest and resemble stations from other urban rail networks of their age. These stations which fulfil only the bare minimum of their needs have today fallen short in passenger capacity. Basic repairs have started at the Kontula and Itäkeskus metro stations.

Trains go from the stations both to the terminus stations in Espoo and to the terminus stations in eastern Helsinki at rush hour time at intervals of two and a half minutes. Trains carrying passengers stop at every station on their route regardless of their line and the Helsinki Metro does not have express trains that would pass a station without stopping. The trains have benches for passengers to sit on as well as bars to hold on to. The carriages are also accessible by wheelchair.

Bridge repairs are sometimes performed on the metro track in summer time causing the metro traffic to run at exceptional schedules. If an exceptional schedule is used in summer time the train intervals are longer and trains from Kivenlahti or Tapiola only run on one line. Traffic on the other line is handled with trains going only from their terminus to Itäkeskus. Such trams travelling on a shorter route are called pendel trains. During exceptional schedules in the summers of 2004, 2005, 2007 and 2009 the pendel trains have run to Mellunmäki, and in the summers of 2003, 2006 and 2008 they have run to Vuosaari. Passengers travelling from the city centre on branches run by pendel trains have to switch trains at Itäkeskus metro station. In the summers of 2005 and 2006 the Siilitie and Sahaajankatu bridges were repaired. In summer 2007 the Kulosaari bridge was repaired under the northern branch, and in summer 2008 from the southern branch. In summer 2012 metro trains ran only between Vuosaari and Itäkeskus and between Mellunmäki and Ruoholahti, except for 14 to 22 July when the metro trains ran only between Vuosaari and Itäkeskus and between Mellunmäki and Kulosaari. This exceptional arrangement was because of construction work at the Kalasatama centre and repairs at Siilitie metro station, and metro traffic was replaced with buses. In summer 2024 the Mellunmäki metro station was out of use for three months because of basic repairs of the Länsimäentie bridges. Metro traffic was replaced with buses at the time.

=== Feeder traffic ===
There are feeder bus lines from several central metro stations in Espoo and Helsinki.

Feeder lines starting from 14 August 2023:

Line number	Route
16	Rautatientori (M) – Kruununhaka – Kalasatama (M) – Kulosaari (M) – Korkeasaari
21	Kamppi (M) – Vattuniemi – Lauttasaari (M)
22	Punavuori – Ruoholahti (M) – Lauttasaari (M) – Katajaharju
24	Kamppi (M) – Seurasaari
25	Kamppi (M) – Pajamäki
26	Selkämerenkatu – Ruoholahti (M) – Salmisaari
37	Kamppi (M) – Myyrmäki
41	Kamppi (M) – Pohjois-Haaga railway station
42	Kamppi (M) – Kannelmäki
54	Itäkeskus (M) – Pitäjänmäki
56	Kalasatama (M) – Käpylä – Kannelmäki railway station
57	Kontula (M) – Munkkiniemi
59	Sompasaari – Kalasatama (M) – Pasila – Pitäjänmäki – Malminkartano
79	Herttoniemi (M) – Viikki – Malmi – Puistola railway station
80	Herttoniemi (M) – Roihuvuori – Roihupelto – Itäkeskus (M)
81	Länsi-Herttoniemi – Herttoniemi (M) – Herttoniemenranta – Kulosaari (M)
82	Herttoniemi (M) – Roihuvuori – Itäkeskus (M)
82B	Herttoniemi (M) – Tammisalo – Roihuvuori – Itäkeskus (M)
83	Herttoniemi (M) – Tammisalo
84	Herttoniemi (M) – Gunillankallio
85	Herttoniemi (M) – Jollas
85B	Herttoniemi (M) – Yliskylä – Jollas
86	Herttoniemi (M) – Santahamina
87	Herttoniemi (M) – Kruunuvuorenranta
88	Herttoniemi (M) – Kaitalahti
89	Herttoniemi (M) – Yliskylä
90	Vuosaari (M) – Aurinkolahti – Vuosaari Harbour
90A	Rautatientori (M) – Kalasatama (M) – Herttoniemi (M) – Siilitie (M) – Itäkeskus – Rastila (M) – Mustankivenkatu (Vuosaari (M)) – Vuosaari Harbour
92	Itäkeskus (M) – Myllypuro (M) – Myllypuro (Alakiventie)
94	Itäkeskus (M) – Porttitie – Kontula (M) – Kontulankaari
94A	Kotikonnuntie – Kontula (M) – Kivikko – Kontula (M) – Kotikonnuntie
94B	Kontula (M) – Kivikko – Kivikonlaita
95	Itäkeskus (M) – Puotila (M) – Mellunkylä – Mellunmäki (M) – Vesala – Kontula (M) – Keinutie
96	Vuosaari (M) – Porslahdentie
97	Itäkeskus (M) – Puotila (M) – Vartioharju – Mellunmäentie – Mellunmäki (M)
97V	Itäkeskus (M) – Puotila – Vartioharju – Mellunmäentie – Mellunmäki (M)
98	Itäkeskus (M) – Marjaniemi – Rastila (M)
105	Mankkaa - Haukilahti – Westendinasema bus station – Lauttasaari (M)
111	Otaniemi (student village) – Aalto University (M) – Tapiola (M) – Westend – Haukilahti – Matinkylä (M)
113	Tapiola (M) – Laajalahti – Perkkaa – Leppävaara railway station
114	Matinkylä (M) - Tapiola (M) – Urheilupuisto (M) – Mankkaa – Kilo railway station – Leppävaara railway station
115	Tapiola (M) – Urheilupuisto (M) – Mankkaa
116	Tapiola swimming pool – Tapiola (M) – Pohjois-Tapiola
117	Tapiola swimming pool – Tapiola (M) – Aarnivalkea – Tapiola swimming pool
118	Tapiola (M) – Niittykumpu (M) – Suurpelto – Tuomarila – Espoo railway station
119	Tapiola swimming pool – Tapiola (M) – Urheilupuisto (M) – Niittykumpu (M)
121	Kamppi (M) – Niittykumpu (M) – Olari
121A	Kamppi (M) – Niittykumpu (M) – Olari – Latokaski
124	Tapiola (M) – Niittykumpu (M) – Olari – Espoonlahti (M)
125	Tapiola (M) – Niittykumpu (M) – Olari – Nöykkiö – Espoonlahti
133	Friisilä – Matinkylä (M) – Henttaa
137	Matinkylä (M) – Matinkallio – Piispankylä – Kuitinmäki
138	Matinkylä (M) – Nuottaniemi – Matinkallio
145	Espoonlahti (M) – Soukka (M) – Suvisaaristo
147	Espoonlahti (M) – Laurinlahti – Soukka (M) – Ala-Soukka
148	Espoonlahden keskus – Lippulaiva (Espoonlahti (M)) – Soukka (M) – Iivisniemi
149	Espoonlahden keskus – Kivenlahti (M) – Kivenlahti
158	Matinkylä (M) – Nöykkiö – Tillinmäki – Espoonlahti (M)
159	Matinkylä (M) – Nöykkiö – Latokaski
162	Espoonlahti (M) – Kivenlahti (M) – Saunalahti – Kauklahti
163	Espoonlahti (M) – Tillinmäki – Saunalahti – Kurttila
163K	Espoonlahti (M) – Kurtinmalmi
164	Kamppi (M) – Saunalahti – Kurttila
164K	Kamppi (M) – Saunalahti – Tillinmäki
165	Espoonlahti (M) – Kivenlahti (M) – Saunalahti – Kurttila – Kauklahti – Vanttila
171	Matinkylä (M) – Masala – Jorvas railway station – Gesterby – Ravalls – Kirkkonummi railway station
172	Matinkylä (M) – Masala – Jorvas railway station – Gesterby – Ravalls – Kirkkonummi railway station – Kantvik
173	Matinkylä (M) – Masala – Jorvas railway station – Gesterby – Ravalls – Kirkkonummi railway station – Kantvik – Upinniemi
173Z	Matinkylä (M) – Kirkkonummi railway station – Kantvik – Upinniemi
175	Matinkylä (M) – Sarvvik – Masala – Jorvas
175V	Matinkylä (M) – Jorvas
520	Matinkylä (M) – Nuottaniemi – Matinkylä (M) – Olari – Leppävaara - Myyrmäki - Martinlaakso
530	Matinkylä (M) – Espoon keskus - Lähderanta – Myyrmäki
561	Itäkeskus (M) – Liikuntamylly (Myllypuro (M)) – Malmi – Aviapolis – Kivistö
562	Itäkeskus (M) – Liikuntamylly (Myllypuro (M)) – Malmi – Aviapolis – Helsinki-Vantaa Airport
570	Mellunmäki (M) – Tikkurila – Aviapolis – Helsinki-Vantaa Airport
572	Mellunmäki (M) – Martinlaakso
587	Mellunmäki (M) – Korso – Vierumäki
738	Kalasatama (M) – Kerava railway station
801	Itäkeskus (M) – Varjakanvalkama
802	Itäkeskus (M) – Siilitie (M) – Herttoniemi (M) – Jollas
805	Itäkeskus (M) – Puotila (M) – Mellunmäki (M) – Myllypuro (M) – Myllypuro
812	Rukatunturintie – Mellunmäki (M) – Kontula (M) – Myllypuro (M) – Myllypuro
813	Vuosaari (M) – Rastila – Merikorttikuja
814	Vuosaari (M) – Northern shopping centre
815	Vuosaari (M) – Isonvillasaarentie
816	Vuosaari (M) – Kallahti – Kallahdenniemi
817	Vuosaari (M) – Kallahti – Ramsinniemi
818	Vuosaari (M) – Vuosaari Harbour – Mellunmäki (M)
831	Itäkeskus (M) – Puotila (M) – Landbo
831K	Itäkeskus (M) – Puotila (M) – Karhusaari – Landbo
841	Itäkeskus (M) – Puotila (M) – Söderkulla – Nikkilä
842	Itäkeskus (M) – Puotila (M) – Eriksnäs
843	Itäkeskus (M) – Puotila (M) – Söderkulla – Kalkkiranta
844	Itäkeskus (M) – Puotila (M) – Taasjärvi

Night lines along the metro line:

Line number	Route
85N	Helsinki Central railway station – Kalasatama (M) – Yliskylä – Jollas
86N	Helsinki Central railway station – Kalasatama (M) – Kulosaari – Herttoniemi – Santahamina
90N	Helsinki Central railway station – Kalasatama (M) – Herttoniemi (M) – Länsi-Herttoniemi – Rastila (M) – Vuosaari (M) – Vuosaari
92N	Helsinki Central railway station – Kalasatama (M) – Herttoniemi (M) – Myllypuro (M) – Kontula (M) – Kontula
94N	Rautatientori – Kalasatama (M) – Itäkeskus (M) – Myllypuro (M) – Kontula (M) – Kontulankaari
95N	Rautatientori – Kalasatama (M) – Tammisalo – Roihuvuori – Puotila (M) – Mellunmäki – Länsimäki
96N	Helsinki Central railway station – Kalasatama (M) – Herttoniemi (M) – Siilitie (M) – Rastila – Aurinkolahti – Porslahdentie
97N	Helsinki Central railway station – Kalasatama (M) – Herttoniemi (M) – Siilitie (M) – Itäkeskus (M) – Puotila – Mellunmäki (M) – Kotikonnuntie

Other bus lines along the Länsimetro line:

Line number	Route
52	Kuninkaantammi – Kannelmäki – Huopalahti – Munkkivuori – Aalto University (M) – Otaniemi
510	Kivenlahti (M) – Espoonlahti (M) – Tapiola (M) – Aalto University (M) – Meilahti – Pasila railway station – Kalastama (M) – Herttoniemi (M)
531	Tiistilä – Nuottaniemi – Matinkylä (M) – Olari – Suna – Espoon keskus
533	Hyljelahti – Matinkylä (M) – Olari – Suurpelto – Nihtisilta – Kauniainen as. – Lippajärvi – Järvenperä
542	Soukanniemi – Soukka (M) – Espoonlahti (M) – Kivenlahti (M) – Kattilalaakso – Latokaski – Espoon keskus – Jorvi
544	Leppävaara railway station – Karamalmi – Kokinkylä – Hannus – Kaitaa (M) – Soukka (M) – Lippulaiva (Espoonlahti (M)) – Kivenlahti
548	Tapiola (M) – Mankkaa – Nihtisilta – Kauniainen as. – Lähderanta – Jupperi
549	Tapiola (M) – Mankkaa – Klovi – Kauniainen railway station – Petas – Jorvi Hospital

Night lines along the Länsimetro line:

Line number	Route
108N	Kamppi (M) – Meilahti – Lehtisaari – Otaniemi – Tapiola (M) – Westendinasema bus station
112N	Kamppi (M) – Lauttasaari (M) – Westendinasema – Haukilahti – Matinkylä (M) – Nuottaniemi – Friisilänaukio
113N	Kamppi (M) – Ruoholahti – Tapiola (M) – Laajalahti – Perkkaa – Leppävaara railway station
114N	Kamppi (M) – Ruoholahti – Tapiola (M) – Pohjois–Tapiola – Mankkaa – Nihtisilta – Kilo railway station – Leppävaara as.
118N	Kamppi (M) – Ruoholahti – Tapiola (M) – Orion – Suurpelto – Nihtisilta – Kauniainen railway station – Järvenperä – Jorvin sairaala
125N	Kamppi (M) – Ruoholahti – Tapiola (M) – Niittykumpu (M) – Olari – Eestinlaakso – Nöykkiö – Latokaski
134N	Kamppi (M) – Ruoholahti – Niittykumpu (M) – Olari – Espoon keskus – Tuomarila
146N	Kamppi (M) – Espoonlahti (M) – Kivenlahti – Saunalahti
147N	Kamppi (M) – Hannus – Kaitaa (M) – Soukka (M) – Espoonlahti (M)– Kivenlahti
165N	Kamppi (M) – Kivenlahti (M) – Saunalahti – Kauklahti

== Art ==
In 2014 there were a total of fourteen works of art at the Helsinki Metro stations and in their vicinity. The oldest of these is Torielämää Hakaniemessä (1961) by Aimo Tukiainen. The first work of art at the metro, the colourful wall painting Maa, ilma, tuli ja vesi (1985) by Ipi Kärki on the wall of the top level of the escalators at the Kamppi metro station was moved away during the repairs of the station. Also Anu Matilainen's composition Liike (1985) rising from a sculpture pool was moved to storage during repairs of the Kamppi metro station in summer 2002.

== In literature and music videos ==
The Helsinki Metro is a central feature in the plot of Matti Yrjänä Joensuu's thriller novel Harjunpää ja pahan pappi. The film with the same name based on the book was shot at the Kamppi metro station, on the metro track west of the station, as well as at the Hakaniemi metro station.

The music video of the song Freestyler by Bomfunk MC's was shot at the Hakaniemi metro station and on the metro itself in 1999. By 2024 the video had gathered over a billion viewers.

== Future ==
=== Eastern extension ===
Planned eastern extension of the metro

In 2018, a new zoning plan for the Östersundom area east of Helsinki, was confirmed. New homes are due to be built on the condition that the metro is extended eastwards to serve this area. The eastward extension of the metro has been named Itämetro (English: Eastern Metro, Swedish: Östmetron) as a counterpart to the western extension. The current plan is for the line to continue from Mellunmäki, briefly cross into Vantaa through Länsisalmi and then back into Helsinki through Itäsalmi, before continuing onwards over the municipal border to Majvik in Sipoo. Construction of the metro line is tentatively slated to begin in the 2030s at the earliest.

Proposals also exist for the line to be extended even further east into central Sipoo, possibly as far as to Sibbesborg, to an envisioned new city centre there.

=== Automatic metro ===
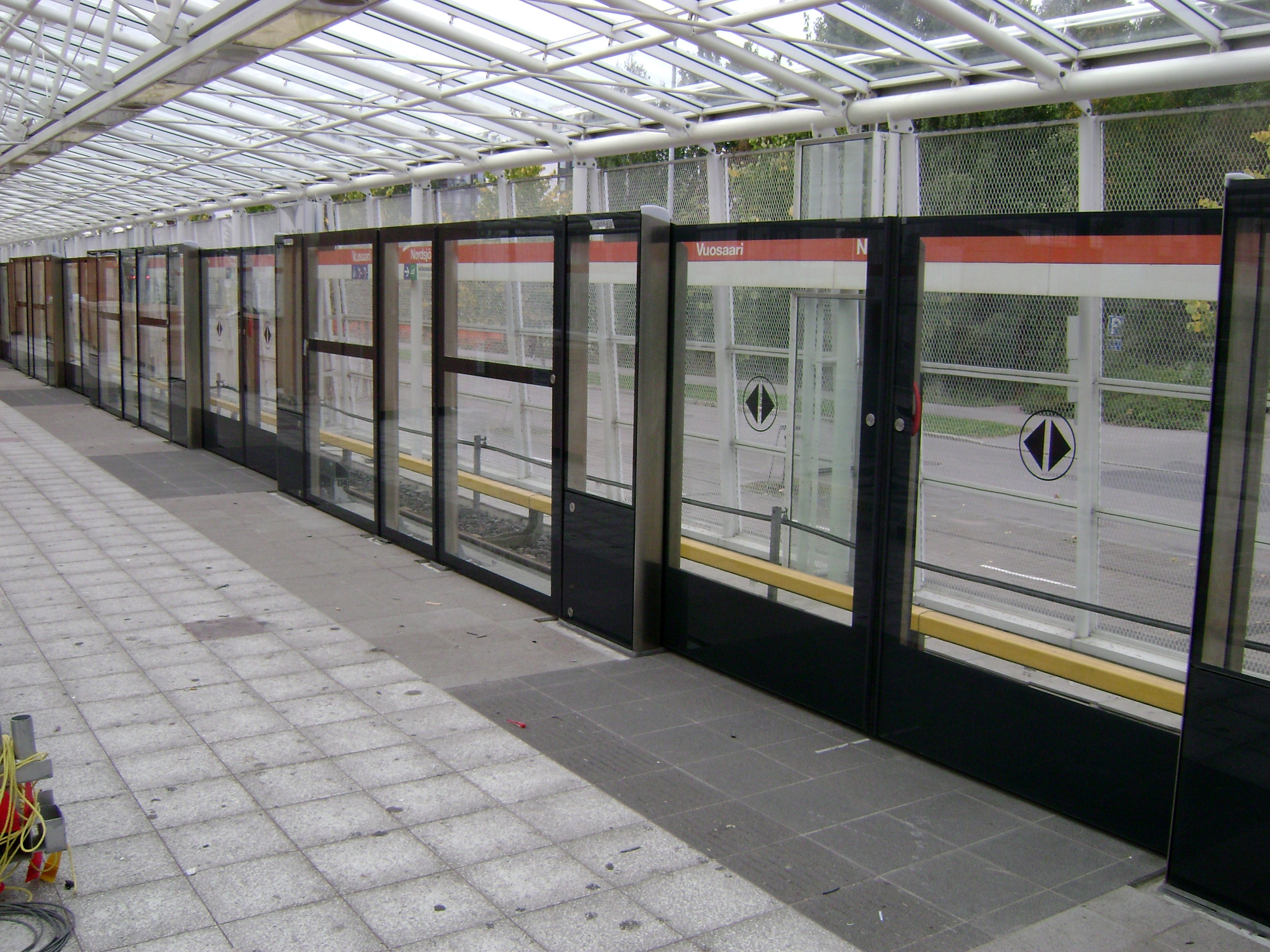
Platform screen doors at the Vuosaari metro station

On 17 May 2006 the Helsinki city council decided that the current, manually driven metro trains would be replaced by automatic ones, operated without drivers. The reason was concern that the control system based on the 1960s and 1970s that was in use at the time was getting outdated. Expansion of the metro was not possible with the technology at the time, for example because getting spare parts for the equipment was getting difficult. The Helsinki City Transit claimed that benefits of the new system would include better passenger safety and benefits resulting from tighter train intervals. Disadvantages included excessive cost, concern about the functionality of the new technology and questions about passenger safety. If the project had been carried out as planned, it would have enabled metro trains to drive without a driver, controlled entirely by remote control. According to existing metro drivers it was unclear if a fully driverless could be introduced upon the completion of the project.

The estimated cost of the project presented to the city council was 70 million euro and the project was estimated to be completed in 2011. By 2011, the estimated cost had risen to 115 million euro and the estimated date of completion had moved from 2014 to a hitherto unspecified date.

In January 2012 the city of Helsinki announced that the aim for full automation of the metro would be cancelled, and the total estimated cost of the automation project would be 170 million euro. Because of repeated delays and difficult technical problems the board of the Helsinki City Transit finally decided on 15 April 2012 to abandon the whole project of automating the metro and only the signalling controls and the automatic train control would be renewed.

In June 2012 there was an announcement that an agreement had been made between the implementor of the automatic metro and the city council, allowing the automatic metro project to be continued according to the original plan up to December 2014. In December 2014 the board of the Helsinki City Transit decided to cancel the contracts with Siemens about the automatic metro. The reason was to ensure traffic on the Länsimetro extension would start in 2016. Despite abandoning the automatic metro, the train interval of the existing metro shortened from 5 minutes to 2.5 minutes, allowing the metro capacity to remain sufficient when the metro trains were shortened. The Länsimetro extension was planned with this driverless operation in mind and the stations were built shorter than the existing ones which meant that the maximum train length for the whole system had to be reduced in 2017 when the Länsimetro extension opened.

The system is planned to be automated eventually as the old M100 and M200 trains are approaching the end of their effective service lifespan. The automation project will happen in two stages, a partial automation in the late 2020s together with new M400 series trains and the full automation in the 2030s. There will be a new contest for the automatic metro in the near future when the existing metro trains have been fully replaced with new ones. According to plans accepted in 2021 this would take place from 2029 to 2032 by transferring to a semi-automatic metro where the metro trains would still have a driver who would close the doors and take care of the safety while the train would actually be driven by a computer. This system would allow train intervals of 120 seconds. At the same time the new M400 trains would be taken into use. Full automation is intended to be reached in a later phase where the trains would no longer have drivers and the train intervals would be shortened to 100 seconds.

From 25 to 26 September 2010 the metro was completely halted from Saturday evening to Sunday morning because of renewal of security devices at the Roihupelto metro depot, for the first time in its entire history. Metro traffic was replaced with buses at the time. The second time the metro was entirely out of use was from 1 to 2 December 2012 because of installation of a new guidance system. The metro was replaced with buses and trams at the time.

The automation project originally included platform screen doors to be fitted at all stations. They were first installed at Vuosaari metro station in October 2010 but taking them into use was repeatedly delayed. The doors, manufactured by Siemens, were taken down in March 2015 at the end of the automation contract.

In January 2026, CAF was awarded a contract to modernize the signalling system. The upgrades would enable the metro to operate at the GoA2 automation level.

=== Other ===
A second Metro line from Laajasalo via Kamppi to Pasila north of the city centre, and possibly onwards to Helsinki-Vantaa Airport, is also in the planning stages. This is being taken into consideration in city plans and has been discussed by the city assembly, but does not look likely to be seriously planned before the mid-2030s at the earliest. To prepare for this eventuality, a platform level for a crossing line was already excavated during the original construction of the Kamppi station.

The Ring Rail Line, which connects the airport to the rail network, began service in 2015. The current plans commissioned by the city recommend the extension of the tram network, instead of the metro, to Laajasalo. Thus construction of a second metro line along the Laajasalo–Kamppi–Airport route appears unlikely.

There is a plan to extend the Vuosaari section of the line to the new Vuosaari harbour.

A new station is being planned in Roihupelto, between Siilitie and Itäkeskus, to serve a possible future suburb.

== Unused stations ==
In addition to the metro stations already in operation, forward-looking design and architects have led to a number of extra facilities being constructed in case they are needed in the future.

Kamppi
The current metro station lies in an east-west direction but there is a second metro station beneath it that was excavated at the same time of construction in 1981. This second station is perpendicular (north-south) to the first one and has platforms 100 m (330 ft) in length, slightly shorter than those above. Tunnels designed to eventually connect the two sets of lines curve off from the west-end of Kamppi. See also: Helsingin Sanomat published side elevation plan and photograph of second level.

Hakaniemi
Two station boxes were constructed in Hakaniemi. Intended for future expansion, the second is now unused. The unused area was subsequently designated for use as part of the mainline Helsinki City Rail Loop.

Kaisaniemi (Helsingin Yliopisto)
A second area exists below the current platforms, with the intention to allow for future expansion.

Munkkivuori
The designers of Finland's first shopping centre were very enthusiastic about the rumoured plans for a metro system all over Helsinki – something that would not appear for another 20 years. Built in 1964, the station does not fit into any plans of future metro lines and is unlikely to be ever used. The platform area is partially littered with building-rubble from more recent construction works in the area and the only visible evidence of the ahead-of-its-time station are a pair of large escalators. The escalators lead down from the main part of the shopping mall to the below-ground area where the ticket office would have been. The entrance to the lower level is behind the strange-shaped photographic shop.

Pasila

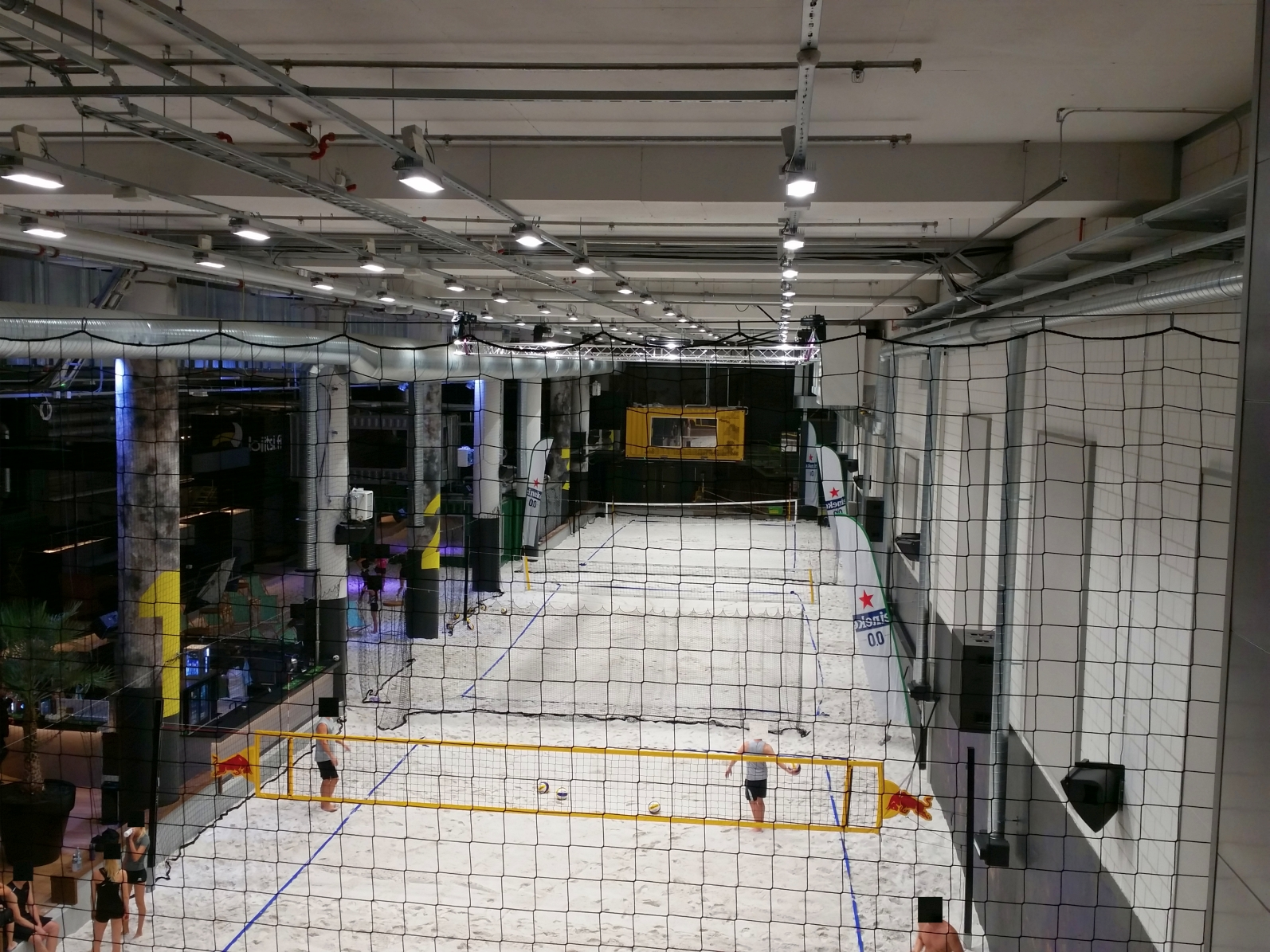
The planned Pasila station. It is currently being used as a sports venue.

A metro station was excavated beneath the Mall of Tripla shopping center. It is not known whether the station will ever be actually used as a metro station as only tentative plans exist for a metro line through Pasila. The rationale behind constructing it was that it was cheaper and easier to do it while the mall was being constructed on top of it than to build it under an existing shopping center in the future. The possibility of a Pasila metro line will be considered some time after the year 2036. Meanwhile the metro station will be used for activities such as beach volley and indoor surfing.

== Statistics ==
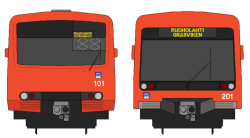
HKL Classes M100 and M200 metro trains that are used on the Helsinki Metro

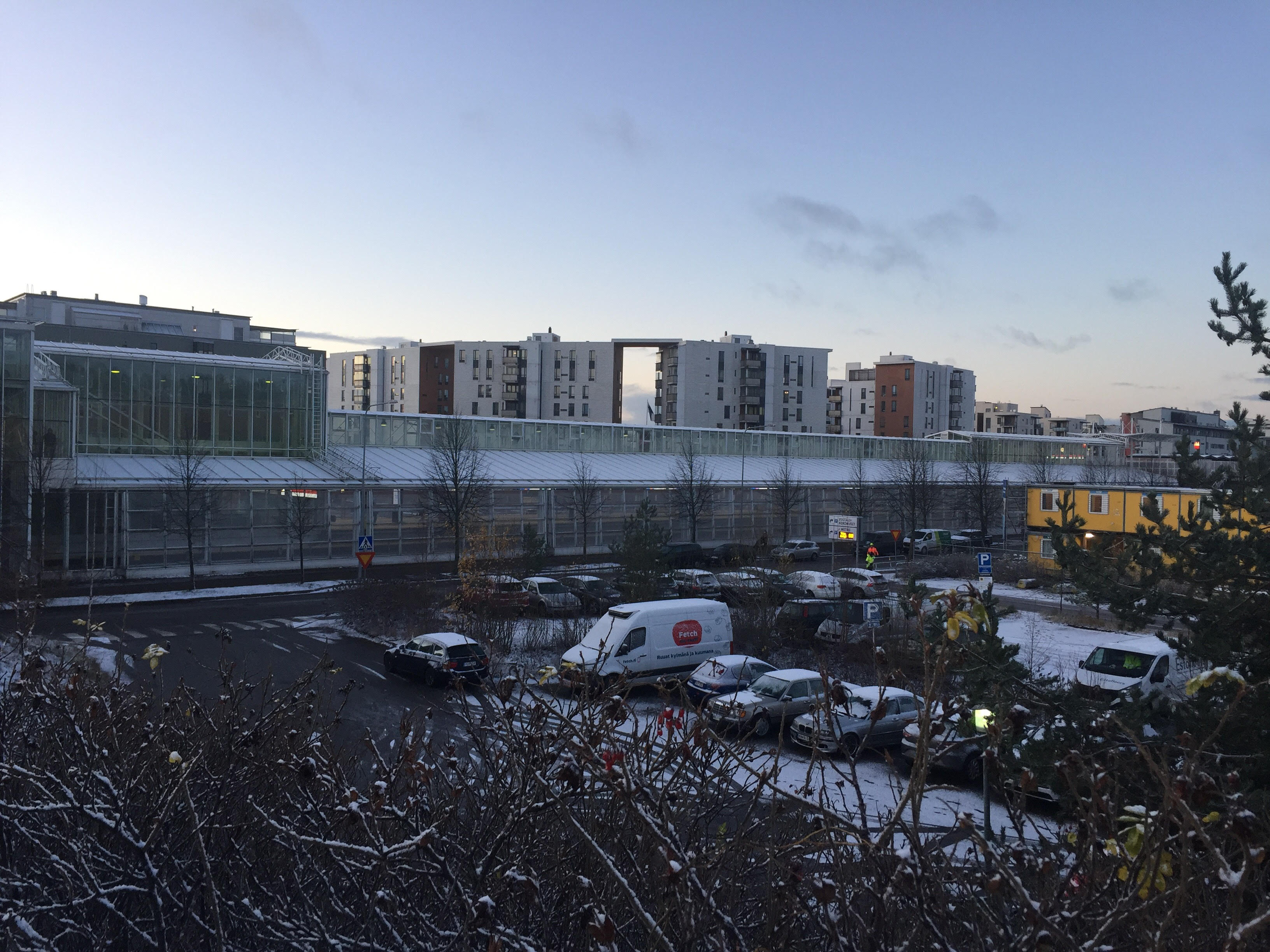
Exterior of the Vuosaari metro station

According to the Helsinki Regional Transport Authority (HSL) yearly report for 2019, the metro system had a total of 92.6 million passengers. The total cumulative length travelled by passengers was 420.1 million kilometres. According to the yearly report for 2003, the total turnover for the metro division of Helsinki City Transport (HKL) was €16.9 million and it made a profit of €3.8 million.

The Metro is by far the cheapest form of transport in Helsinki to operate, with a cost of only €0.032 per passenger kilometre. The same figure for the second cheapest form – trams – was €0.211.

In 2002, the Metro used 39.8 GWh of electricity, though the figure was rising (from 32.2 GWh in 2001). This equals 0.10 kWh per passenger kilometre, and compares favourably with Helsinki's trams (which used 0.19 kWh per passenger kilometre in 2002).

In 2021, the Metro used 64.4 GWh of electricity, however it is notable that the increase is due to expansion of the network.

== See also ==
- Geography of Helsinki
- Helsinki Metropolitan Area
- List of Helsinki metro stations
- List of metro systems
- Public transport in Helsinki
