= Itäkeskus metro station =

Helsinki Metro station

Itäkeskus Östra centrum
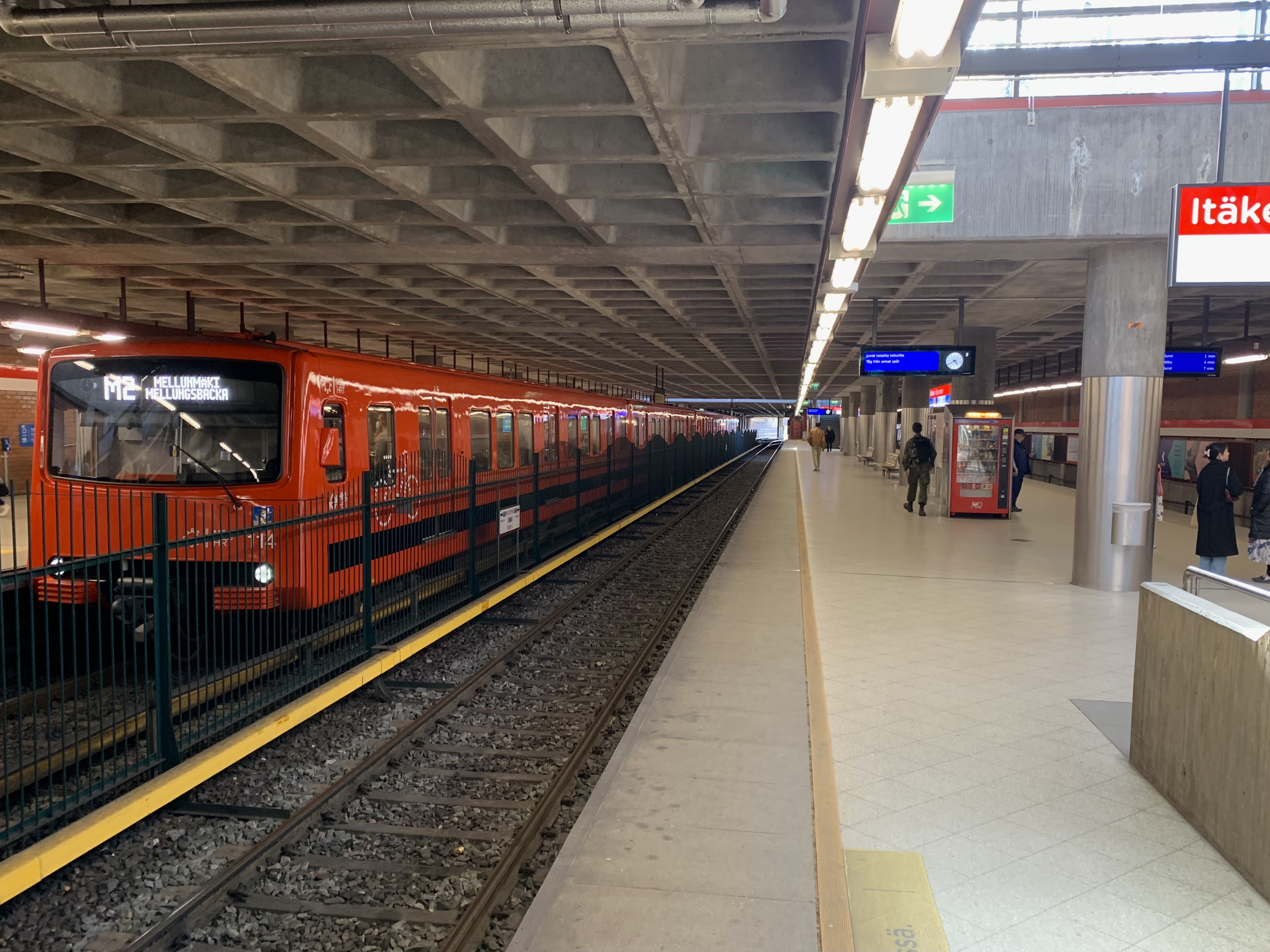

General information
- Location: Tallinnanaukio 2, Helsinki
- Coordinates: 60°12′37″N 25°4′41″E
- System: Helsinki Metro station
- Owner: HKL
- Platforms: 2
- Tracks: 3
- Connections: Light rail: 15; HSL bus lines 54 554 80 82 82B 92 94 94N 95 97 97N 97V 98 500 561 562 802 805 831 831K 841 841N 842 843 844

Construction
- Structure type: At grade
- Parking: 420
- Cycle facilities: 240
- Accessible: Yes

Other information
- Fare zone: B

History
- Opened: 1 June 1982

Passengers
- 40,600 daily

Services
Preceding station	Helsinki Metro	Following station
Siilitie towards Kivenlahti	M1	Puotila towards Vuosaari
Siilitie towards Tapiola	M2	Myllypuro towards Mellunmäki
Location

Itäkeskus metro station (Finnish: Itäkeskuksen metroasema, Swedish: Östra centrums metrostation - "Eastern Center") is a ground-level station on the Helsinki Metro. The station was built on the grounds of the shopping center Itis, and serves the quarter of Itäkeskus in the neighborhood of Vartiokylä in East Helsinki. There are 240 bicycle and 420 car parking spaces at the station. Itäkeskus is served by both M1 and M2 and acts as an exchange station between the two, as it is the easternmost station to be shared by both lines.

Itäkeskus is one of the original stations on the system, and was opened on 1 June 1982. It was designed by Jaakko Ylinen and Jarmo Maunula. Itäkeskus is located 2.1 kilometers east of Siilitie metro station, 1.9 kilometers south of Myllypuro metro station, and 1.0 kilometers south-west of Puotila metro station.

Itäkeskus station is unique in the sense that it is the only station on the Helsinki metro that has 3 platforms. It is also one of the two stations on the network at which trains' doors open on the "wrong" side - on the right instead of the left. This only occurs on track 1 when facing Vuosaari and Mellunmäki, and on track 3 (which is rarely used) facing Helsinki and Kivenlahti. The only other station with this arrangement is Kalasatama.

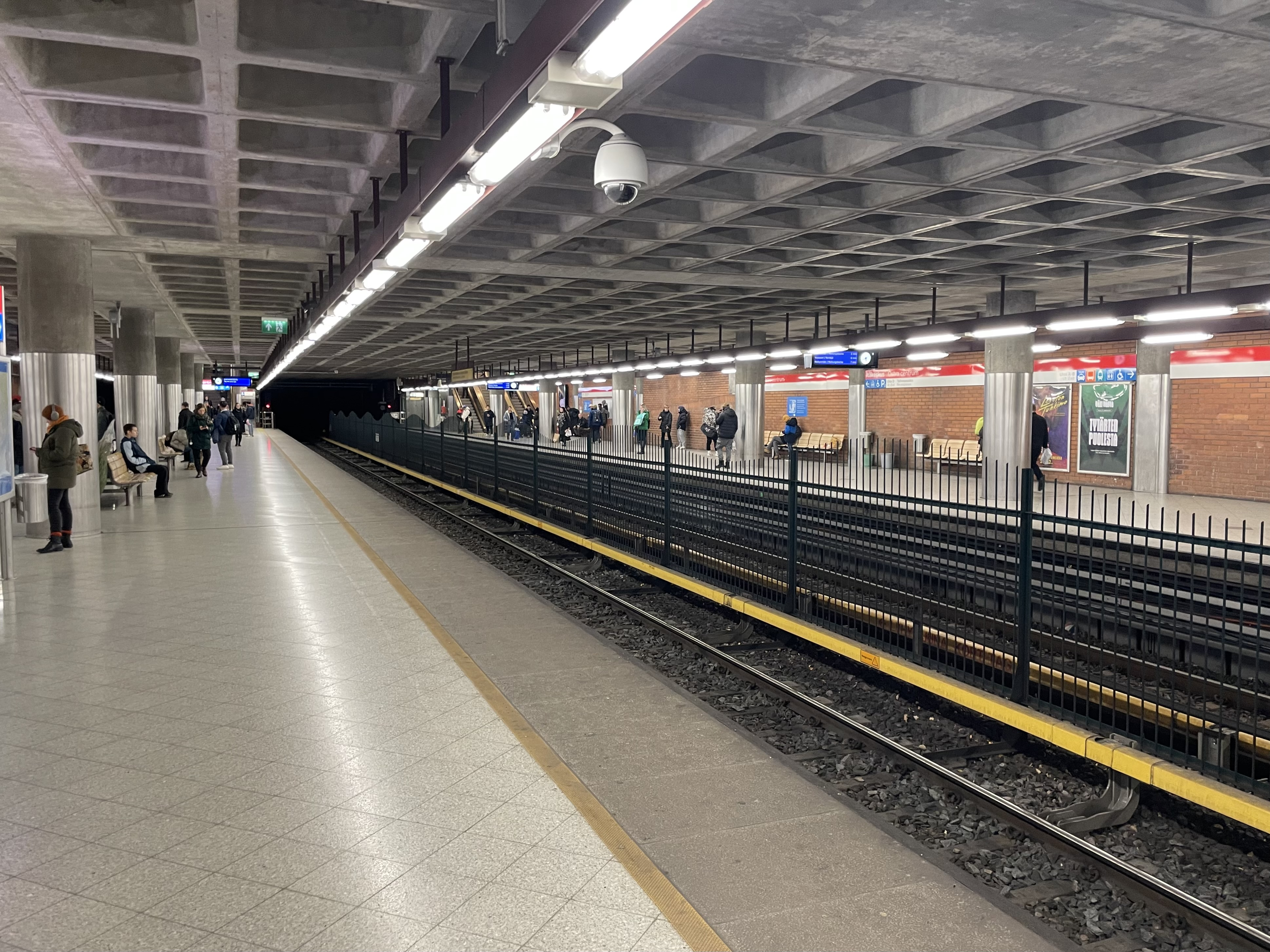
View of the westbound platform

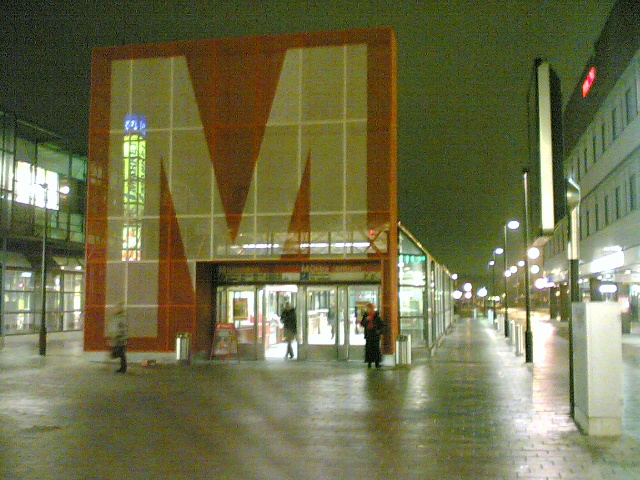
Eastern entrance to the westbound platform at Tallinnanaukio

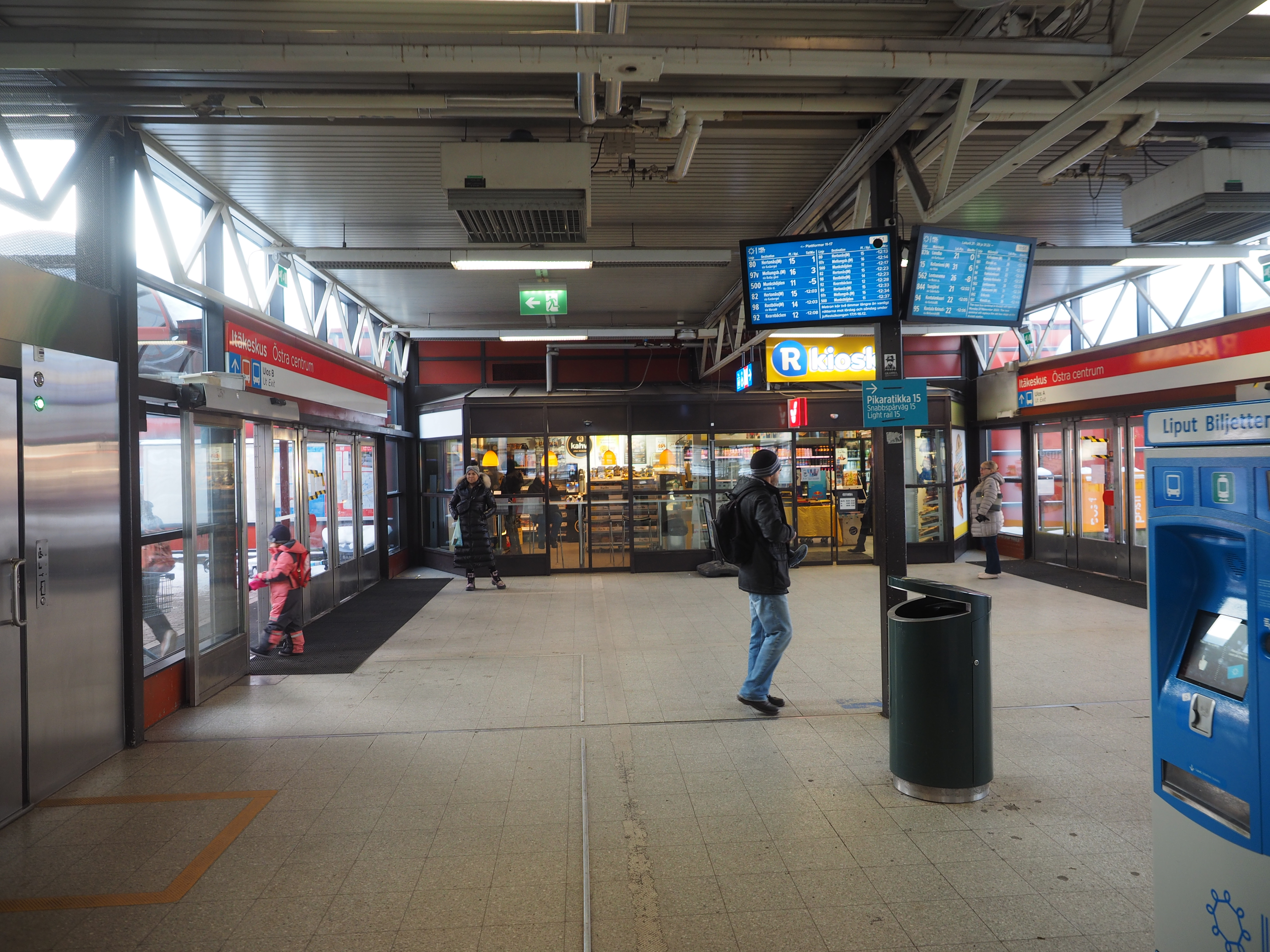
Interior of the western entrance
