= Kulosaari metro station =

Helsinki Metro station

Kulosaari Brändö
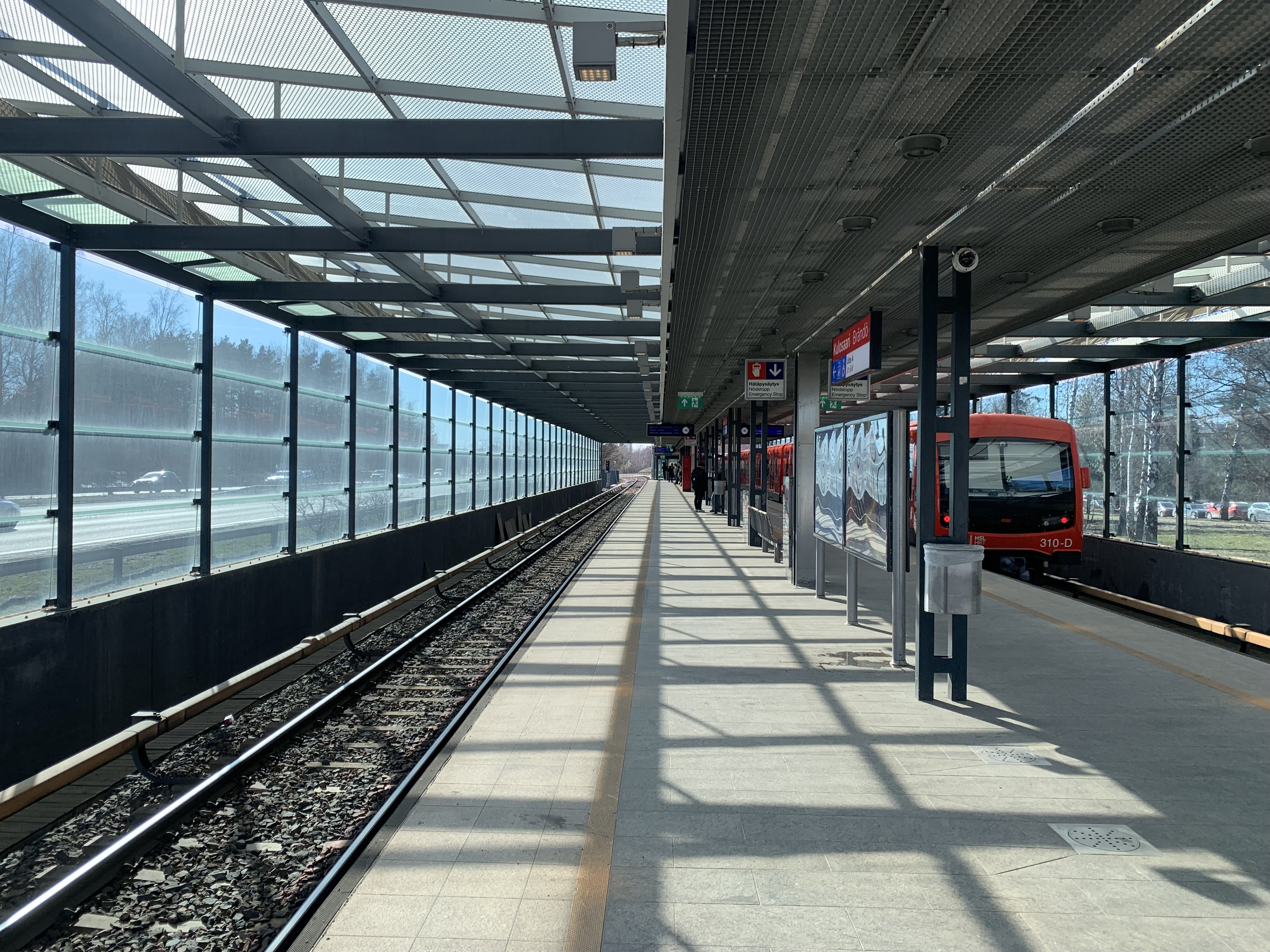

General information
- Location: Ukko-Pekan porras 2, Helsinki
- Coordinates: 60°11′20″N 25°0′29″E
- System: Helsinki Metro station
- Owner: HKL
- Platforms: 1
- Tracks: 2
- Connections: HSL bus lines 16 81 85N 90A 90N 92N 94N 95N 96N 97N 500 510 841N

Construction
- Structure type: At grade
- Parking: 36 spaces
- Cycle facilities: 50 spaces
- Accessible: Yes

Other information
- Fare zone: A

History
- Opened: 1 June 1982

Passengers
- 7,100 daily

Services
Preceding station	Helsinki Metro	Following station
Kalasatama towards Kivenlahti	M1	Herttoniemi towards Vuosaari
Kalasatama towards Tapiola	M2	Herttoniemi towards Mellunmäki
Location

Kulosaari metro station (Finnish: Kulosaaren metroasema, Swedish: Brändö metrostation) is a ground-level station on the Helsinki Metro. It serves the island district of Kulosaari in East Helsinki. There are 50 bicycle and 36 car parking spaces at the station. Both lines M1 and M2 serve Kulosaari.

The station was opened on 1 June 1982, and is therefore one of the original stations on the system. Kulosaari underwent a facelift in 2011. The station was originally designed by Jaakko Ylinen and Jarmo Maunula. It is located 1.8 kilometres from Kalasatama metro station and 1.4 kilometres from Herttoniemi metro station.

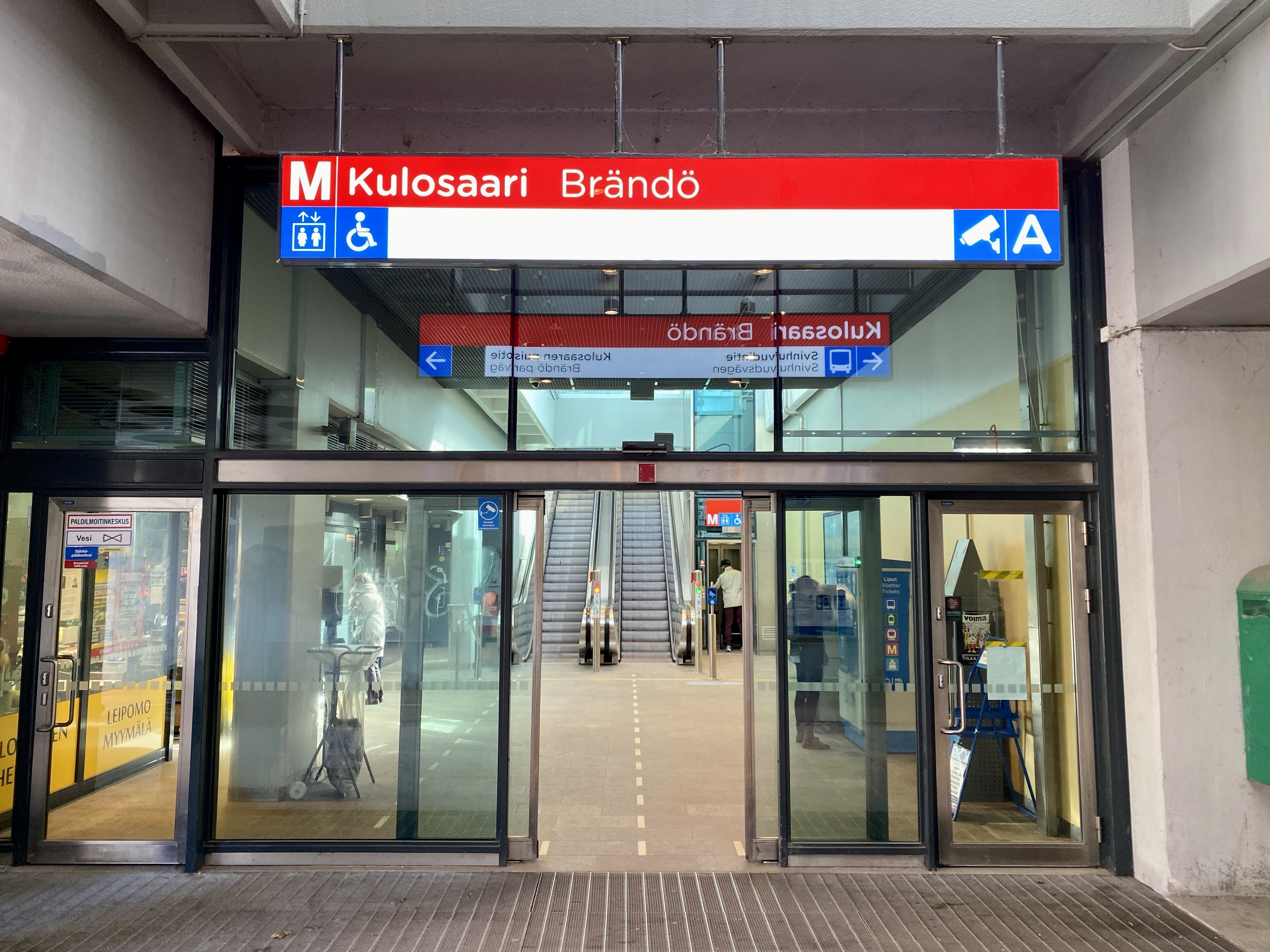
Metro station entrance

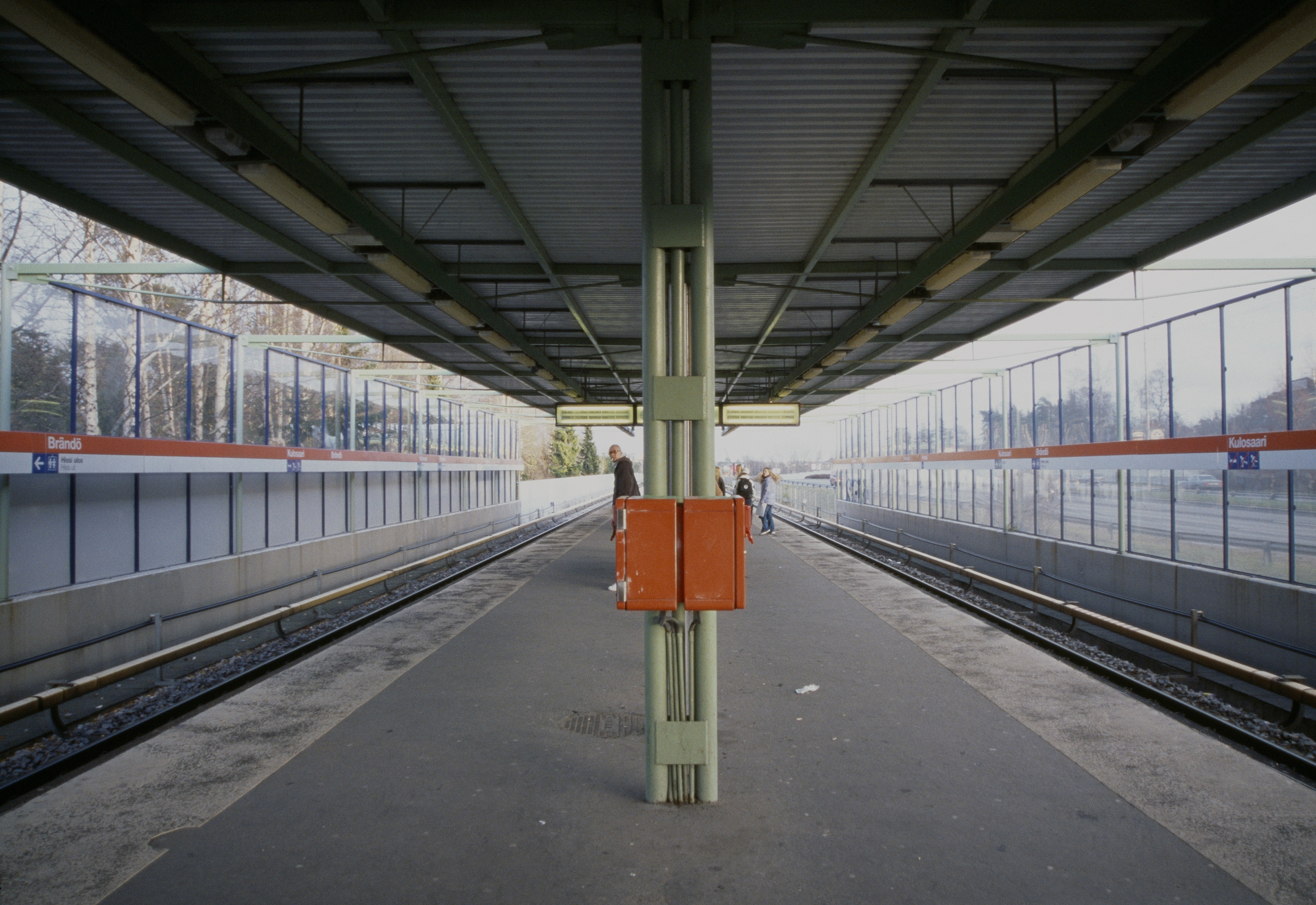
Metro station in 2001
