= Kalasatama metro station =

Helsinki Metro station

Kalasatama Fiskehamnen
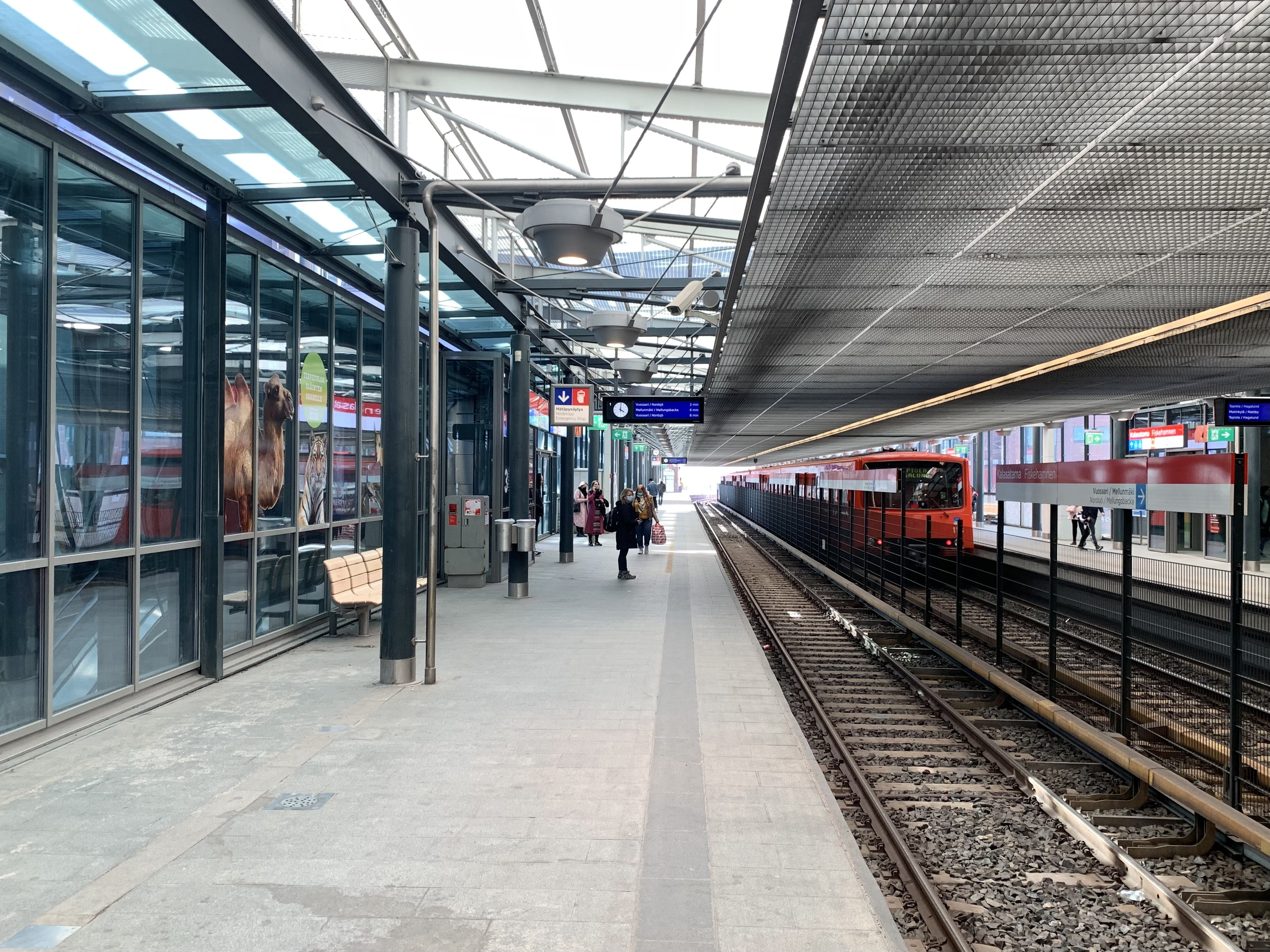
- Kalasatama Station in April 2022.

General information
- Location: Hermannin rantatie 1, Helsinki
- Coordinates: 60°11′15″N 24°58′37″E
- System: Helsinki Metro station
- Owner: HKL
- Platforms: 2 side platforms
- Tracks: 2
- Connections: HSL bus lines 16 50 55 56 59 500 510 85N 86N 90A 90N 92N 94N 95N 96N 97N

Construction
- Structure type: Elevated
- Parking: 300
- Cycle facilities: 224
- Accessible: Yes

Other information
- Fare zone: A

History
- Opened: 1 January 2007

Passengers
- 22,300 daily

Services
| Preceding station | Helsinki Metro | Following station |
|---|---|---|
| Sörnäinen towards Kivenlahti | M1 | Kulosaari towards Vuosaari |
| Sörnäinen towards Tapiola | M2 | Kulosaari towards Mellunmäki |
Location

Kalasatama metro station (Finnish: Kalasataman metroasema, Swedish: Fiskehamnens metrostation - "Fish Harbor") is a ground-level station on the Helsinki Metro, in the capital city of Finland. The station was opened on 1 January 2007, and it serves the eastern part of the central Helsinki district of Sörnäinen's quarter Kalasatama. The area is mainly composed of offices and apartments, with new residential and commercial developments being under construction in the area, including the shopping center Redi. The port facilities previously in the area were moved to Vuosaari Harbour in 2008.

Unlike most other stations on the Helsinki Metro, Kalasatama was built while the metro was still running, which made construction difficult. Despite this, service was not greatly affected on either of the lines during the station's construction. Because the new platforms were built on either side of the existing metro track, Kalasatama is one of only two stations on the Helsinki Metro to have two separate side platforms. The other example of this layout on the Helsinki Metro is Itäkeskus metro station. Other metro stations have only singular island platforms.

Kalasatama metro station is located 1.1 kilometres from Sörnäinen metro station, and 1.8 kilometres from Kulosaari metro station.

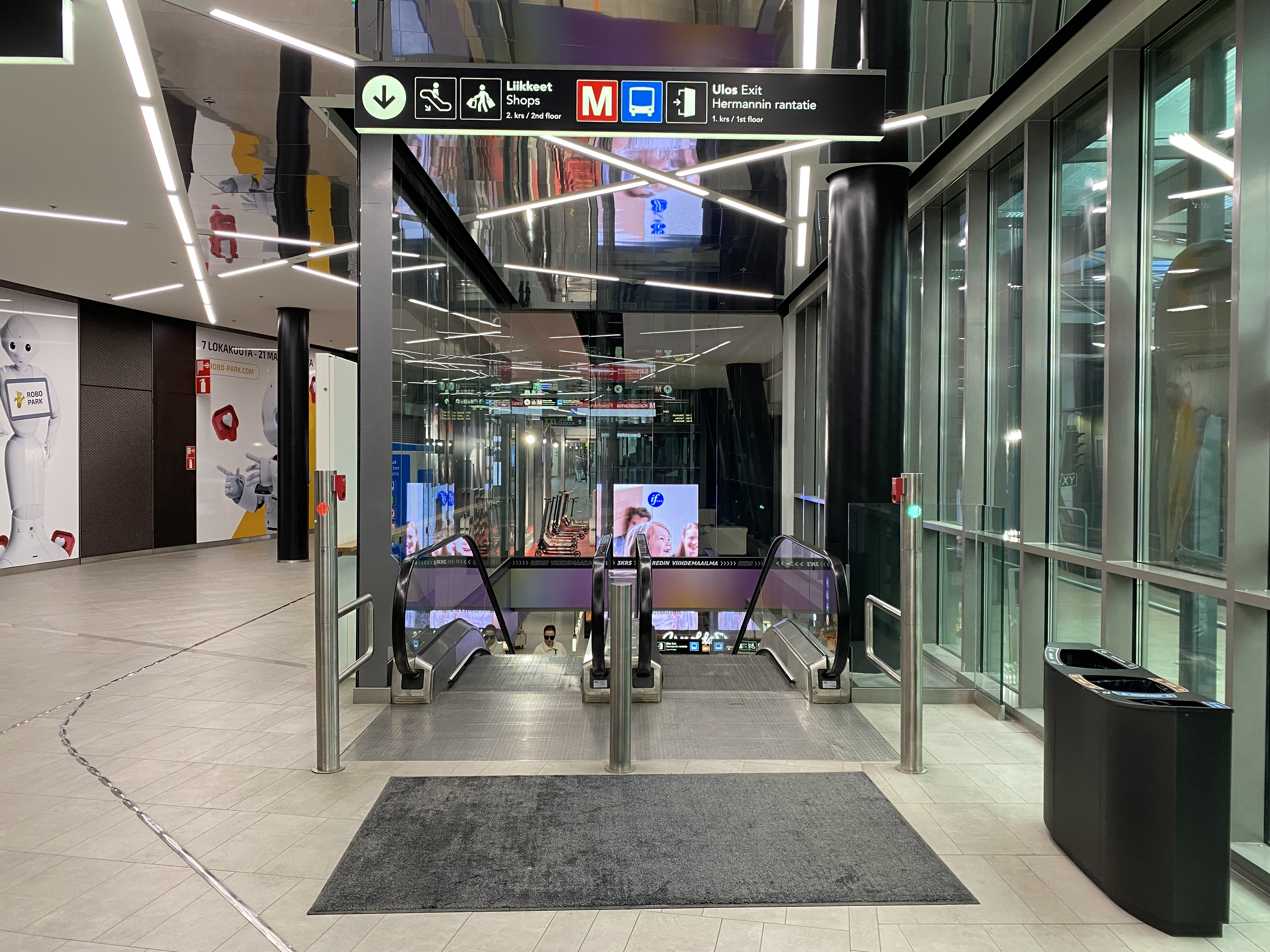
Metro station escalators to Redi shopping centre

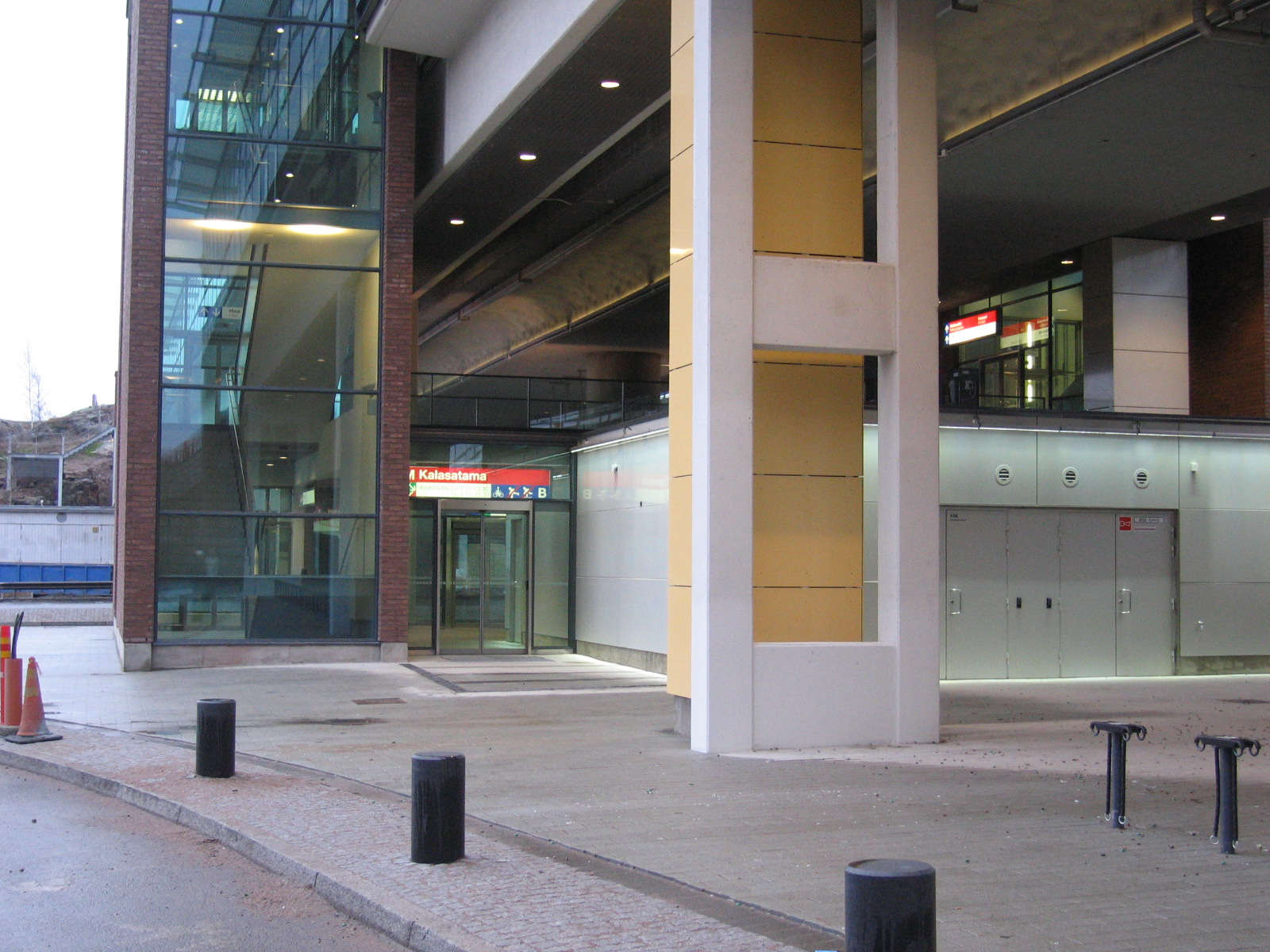
Ground level entrance to the elevated station
