= Siilitie metro station =

Helsinki Metro station

Siilitie Igelkottsvägen
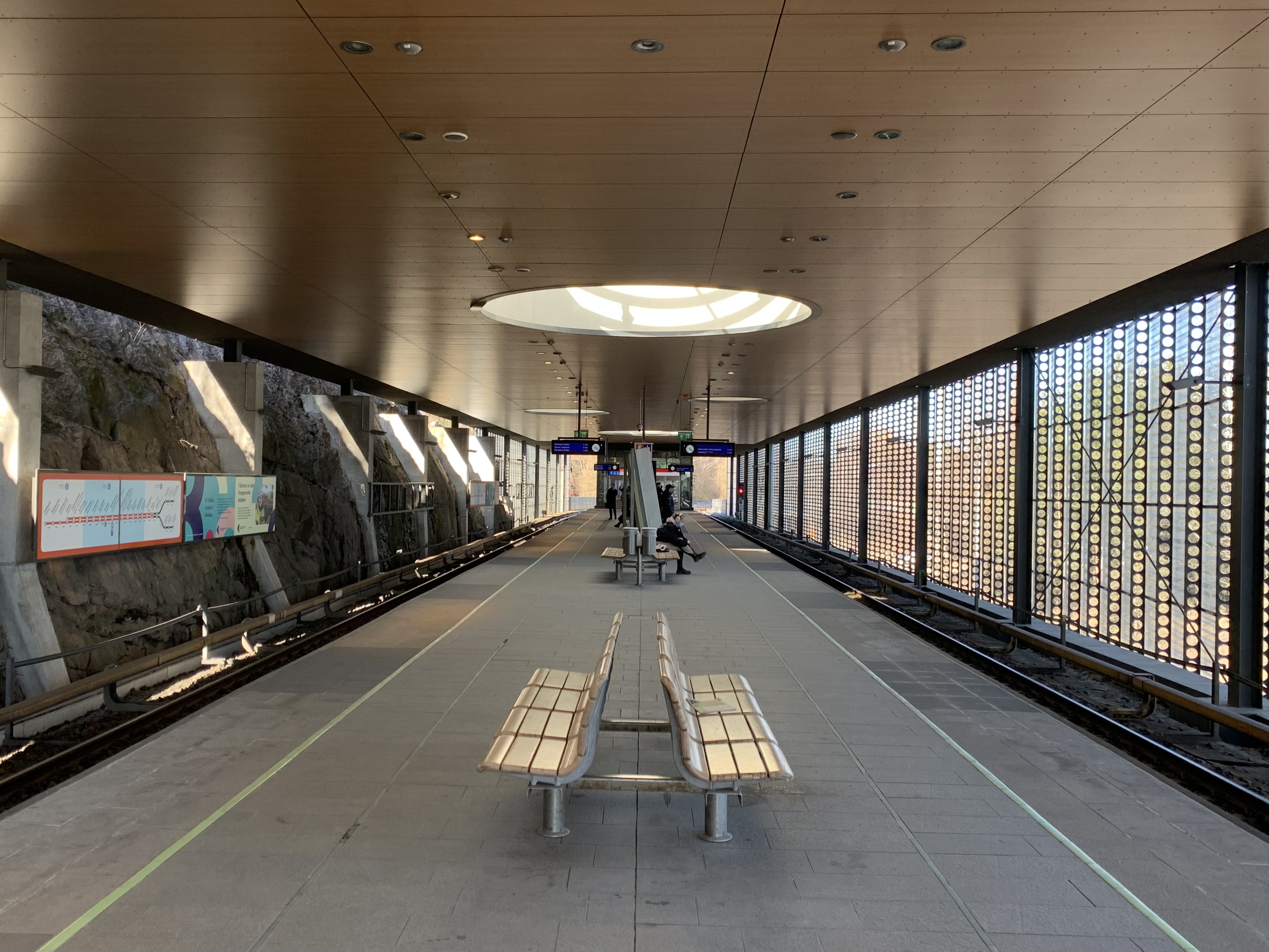

General information
- Location: Siilitie 2, Helsinki
- Coordinates: 60°12′19″N 25°2′37″E
- System: Helsinki Metro station
- Owner: HKL
- Platforms: 1
- Tracks: 2
- Connections: HSL bus lines 58, 58B, 79, 79B, 90A, 92N, 94N, 96N, and 97N

Construction
- Structure type: Elevated
- Parking: 111
- Cycle facilities: 117
- Accessible: Yes

Other information
- Fare zone: B

History
- Opened: 1 June 1982

Passengers
- 9,700 daily

Services
Preceding station	Helsinki Metro	Following station
Herttoniemi towards Kivenlahti	M1	Itäkeskus towards Vuosaari
Herttoniemi towards Tapiola	M2	Itäkeskus towards Mellunmäki
Location

Siilitie metro station (Finnish: Siilitien metroasema, Swedish: Igelkottsvägens metrostation - "Hedgehog Way") is a ground-level station on the Helsinki Metro. It serves the northern part of the district of Herttoniemi in East Helsinki. There are 117 bicycle and 111 car parking spaces at the station. Both lines M1 and M2 serve Siilitie.

Siilitie was one of the original stations on the system, and was opened on the first day of operation on 1 June 1982. It was designed by Jaakko Ylinen and Jarmo Maunula. It is located 1.3 kilometres north-east of Herttoniemi metro station and 2.1 kilometres west of Itäkeskus metro station.

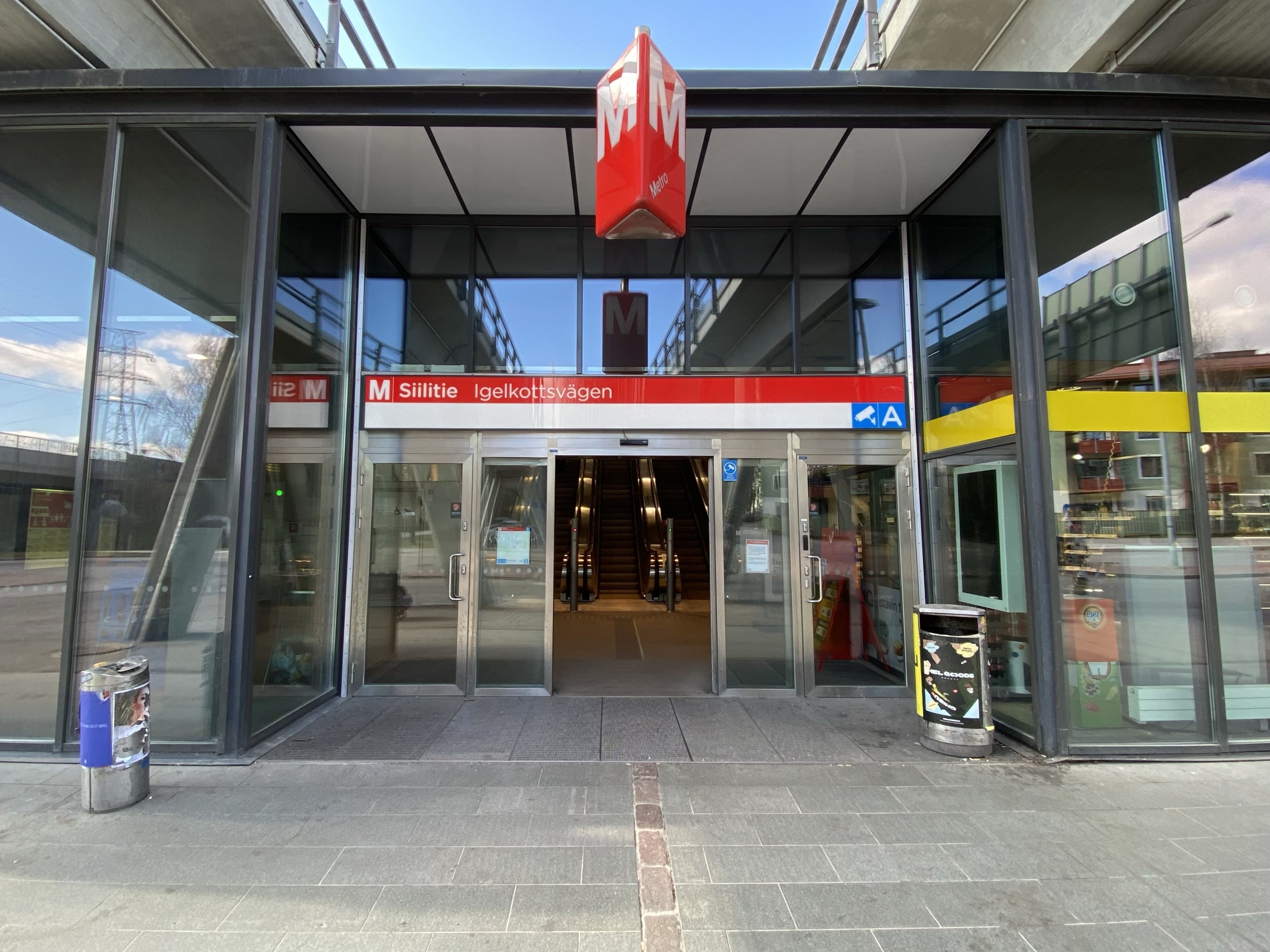
Metro station entrance

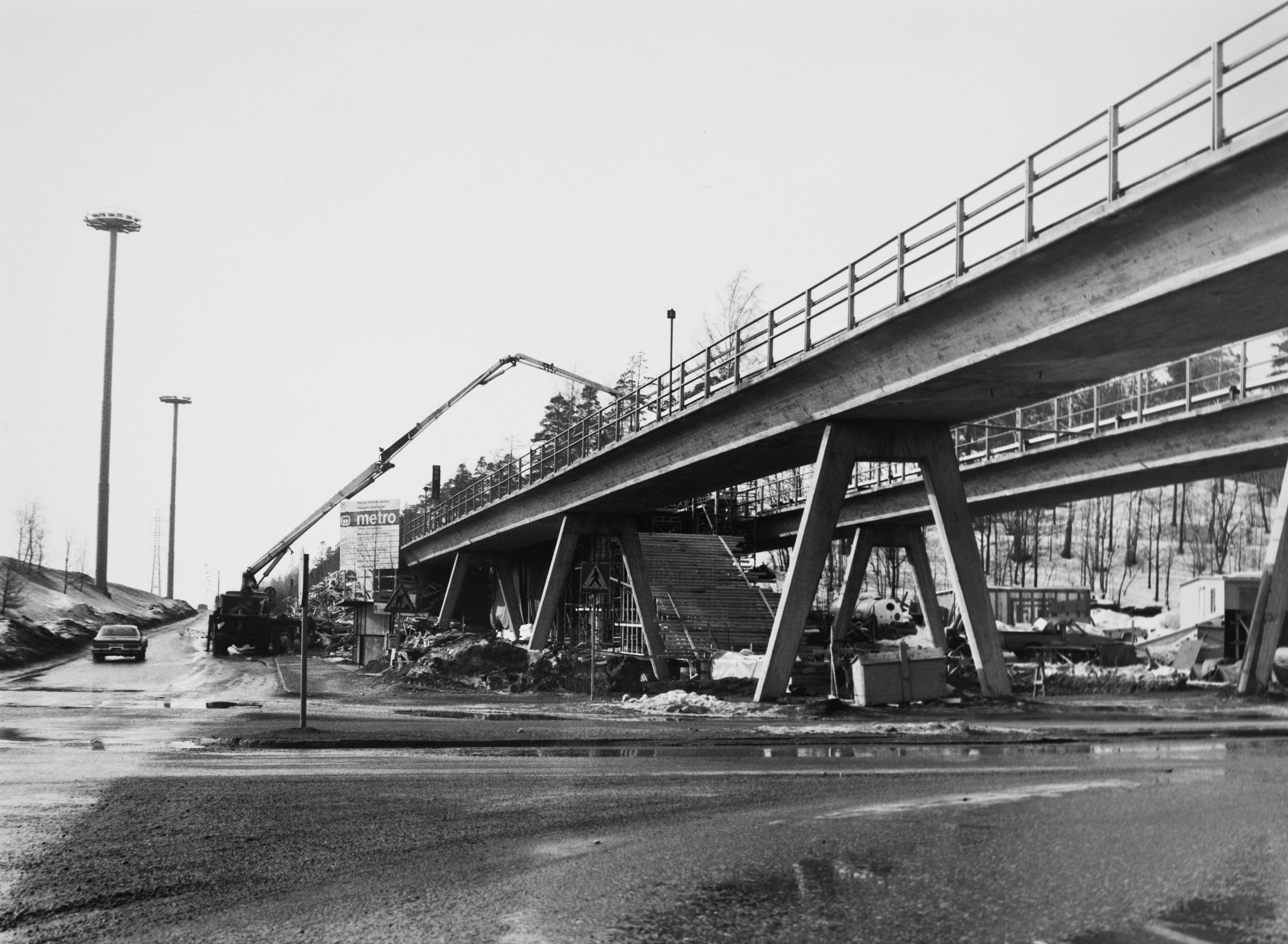
Construction work in the late 1970s

== Name ==
Siilitie (unofficially translated into English as Hedgehog Way) is a veritable oddity in the station naming scheme of the Helsinki metro. As the station is named after the street on which it is located, Siilitie's name is unconventional, because stations on the Helsinki metro tend to be named either after the neighborhood, university, or square which it serves.
