= Herttoniemi metro station =

Helsinki Metro station

Herttoniemi Hertonäs
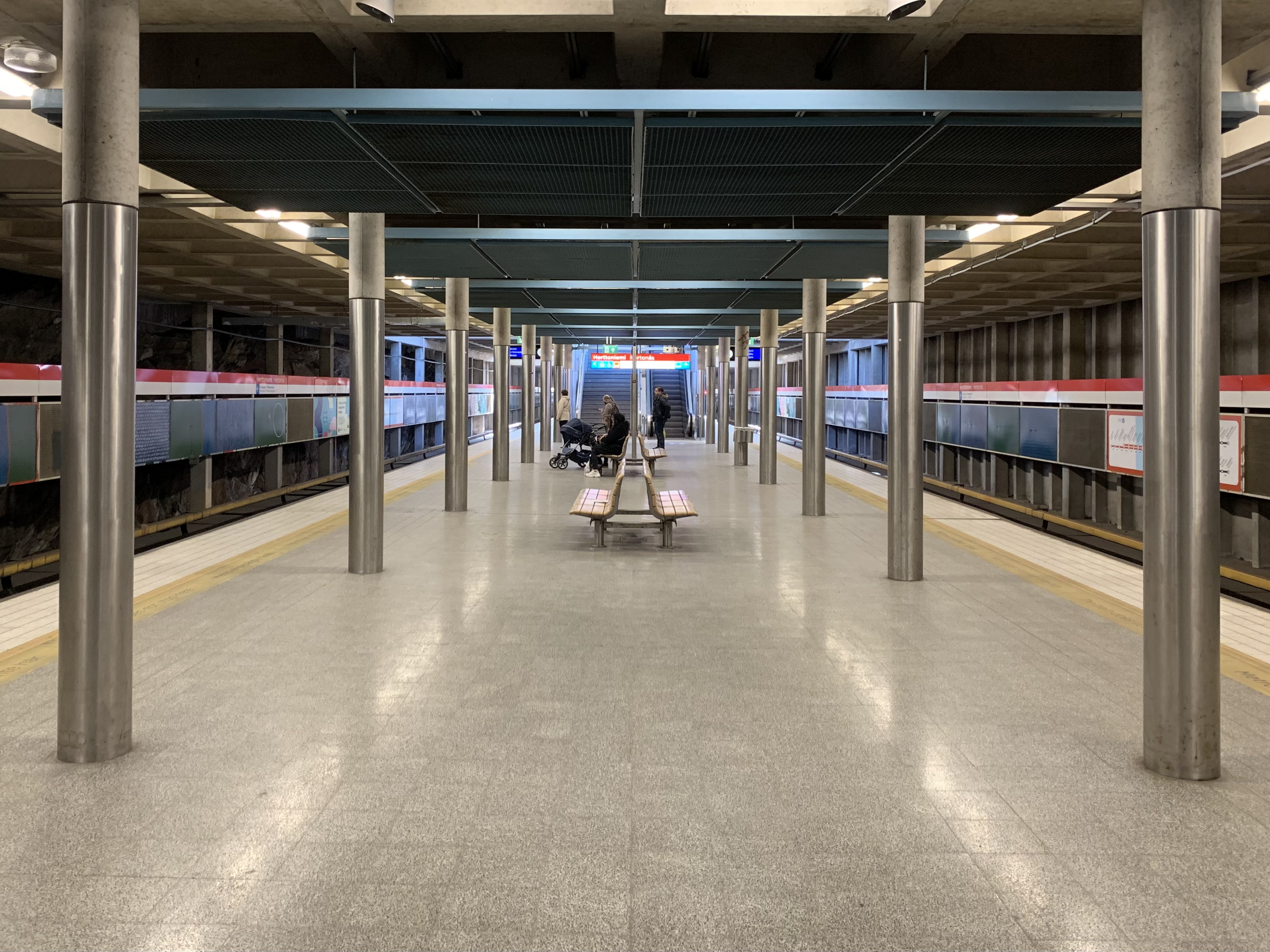

General information
- Location: Hiihtömäentie 13, Helsinki
- Coordinates: 60°11′42″N 25°1′51″E
- System: Helsinki Metro station
- Owner: HKL
- Platforms: 1
- Tracks: 2
- Connections: HSL bus lines 50, 59, 79, 80, 81, 82, 82B, 83, 84, 85, 85B, 86, 86B, 88, 89, and 802

Construction
- Structure type: At grade
- Parking: 148 spaces
- Cycle facilities: 193 spaces
- Accessible: Yes

Other information
- Fare zone: B

History
- Opened: 1 June 1982

Passengers
- 34,500 daily

Services
Preceding station	Helsinki Metro	Following station
Kulosaari towards Kivenlahti	M1	Siilitie towards Vuosaari
Kulosaari towards Tapiola	M2	Siilitie towards Mellunmäki
Location

Herttoniemi metro station (Finnish: Herttoniemen metroasema, Swedish: Hertonäs metrostation) is a ground-level station on the Helsinki Metro. It serves the district of Herttoniemi in East Helsinki. There are 193 bicycle and 148 car parking spaces at the station. Both lines M1 and M2 serve Herttoniemi.

As the station was opened on 1 June 1982, Herttoniemi is one of the system's original stations. It was designed by Jaakko Ylinen and Jarmo Maunula. It is located 1.4 kilometres from Kulosaari metro station and 1.4 kilometres from Siilitie metro station.

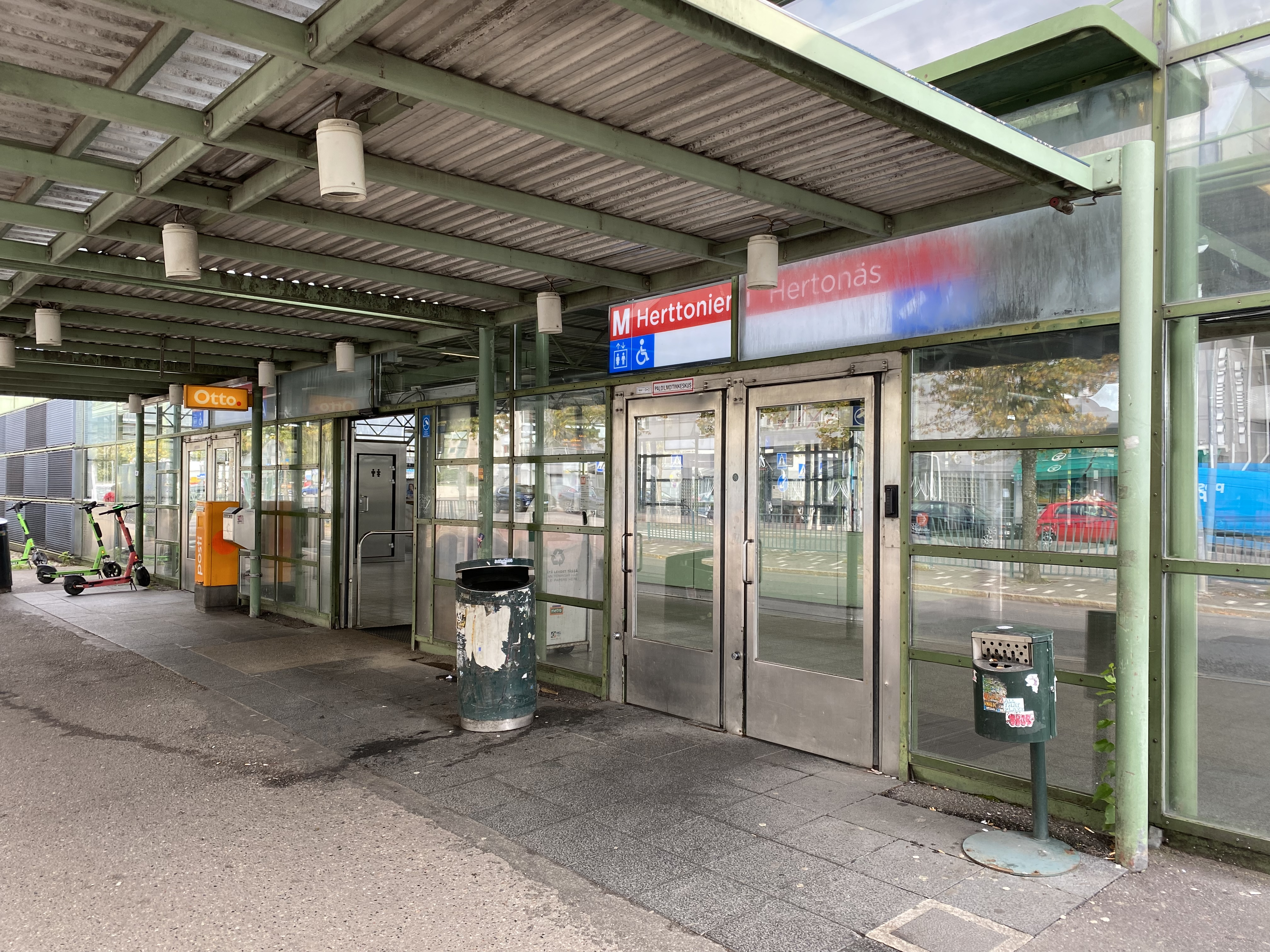
Metro station entrance

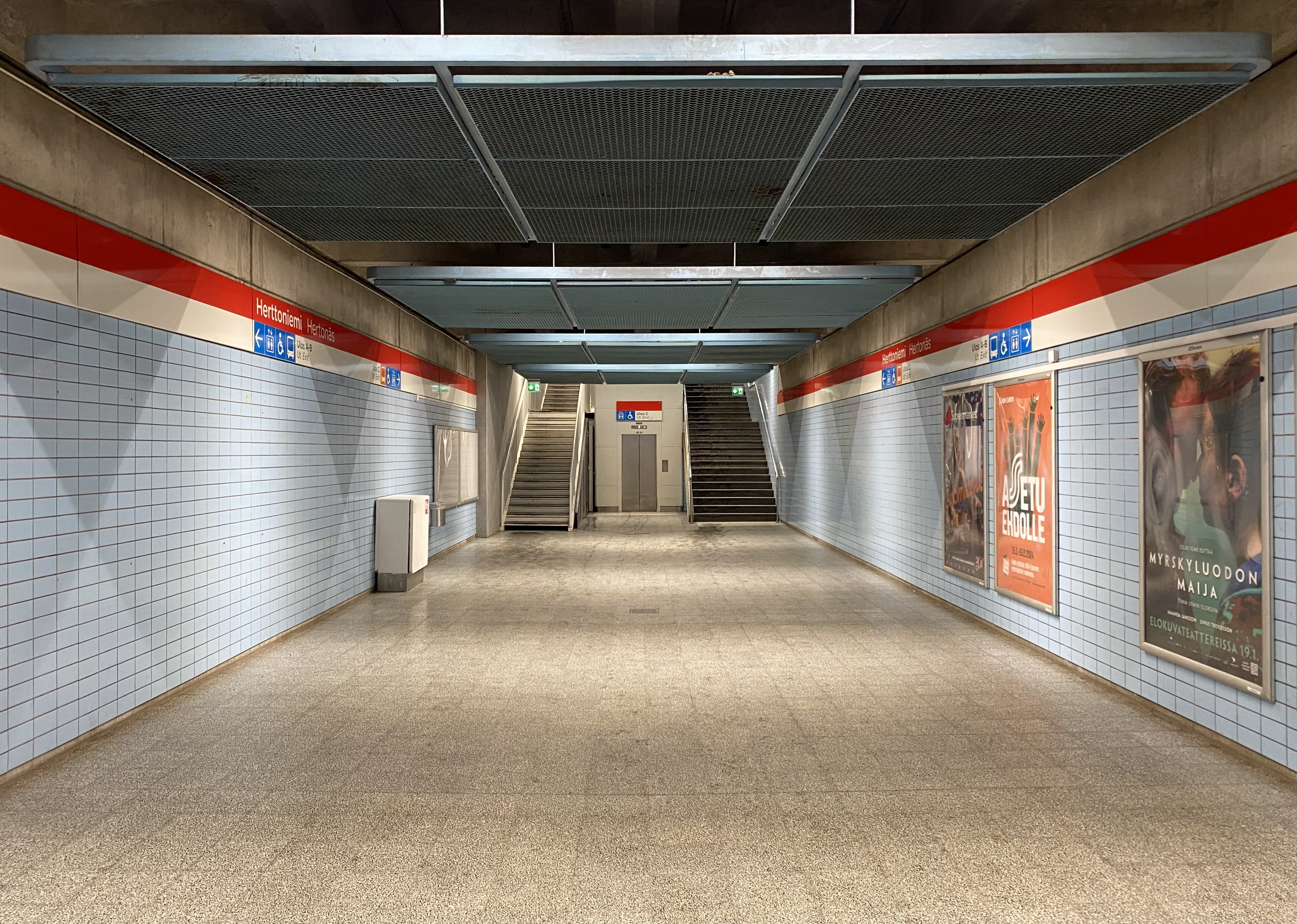
Western entrance tunnel
