= Puotila metro station =

Helsinki Metro station

Puotila Botby gård
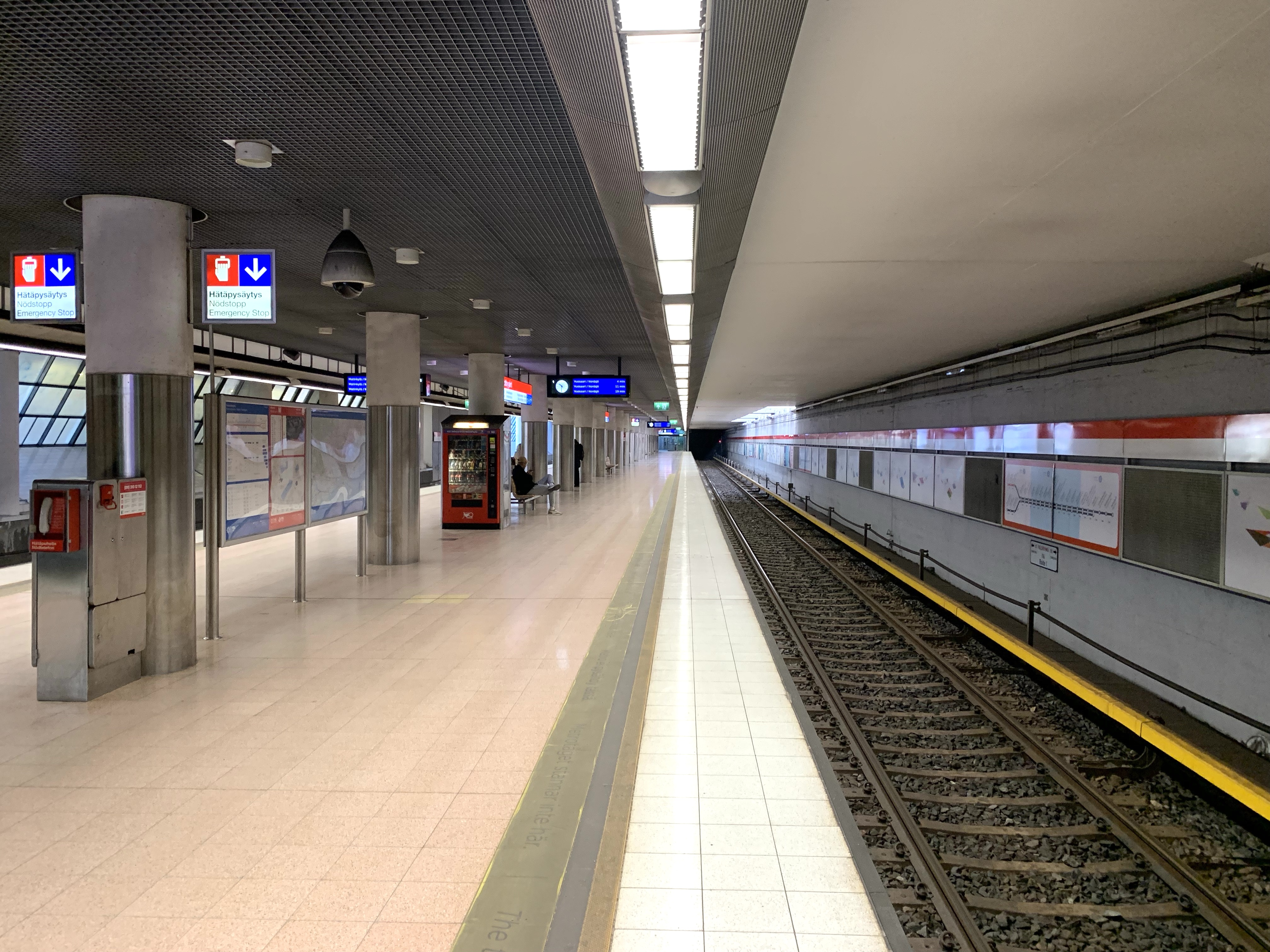

General information
- Location: Puotilan metrotori 7, Helsinki; Vanhanlinnantori 7, Helsinki
- Coordinates: 60°12′53″N 25°5′35″E
- System: Helsinki Metro station
- Owner: HKL
- Platforms: 1
- Tracks: 2
- Connections: HSL bus lines 831 831K 95 95N 97 841 841N 842 843

Construction
- Structure type: Underground
- Parking: 331 spaces
- Cycle facilities: 200 spaces
- Accessible: Yes

Other information
- Fare zone: B

History
- Opened: 31 August 1998

Passengers
- 10,200 daily

Services
Preceding station	Helsinki Metro	Following station
Itäkeskus towards Kivenlahti	M1	Rastila towards Vuosaari
Location

Puotila metro station (Finnish: Puotilan metroasema, Swedish: Botby gårds metrostation) is a ground-level cut-and-cover metro station on the M1 line of the Helsinki Metro. There are 200 bicycle and 331 car parking spaces at Puotila. It serves the neighborhoods of Puotila and Puotinharju in East Helsinki.

The station was opened on 31 August 1998, making it one of the newest stations in the Helsinki Metro. It was designed by the architect bureau Kaupunkisuunnittelu Oy Jarmo Maunula. It is located 1 kilometer from the Itäkeskus, and 2 kilometers from Rastila.

== Pictures ==
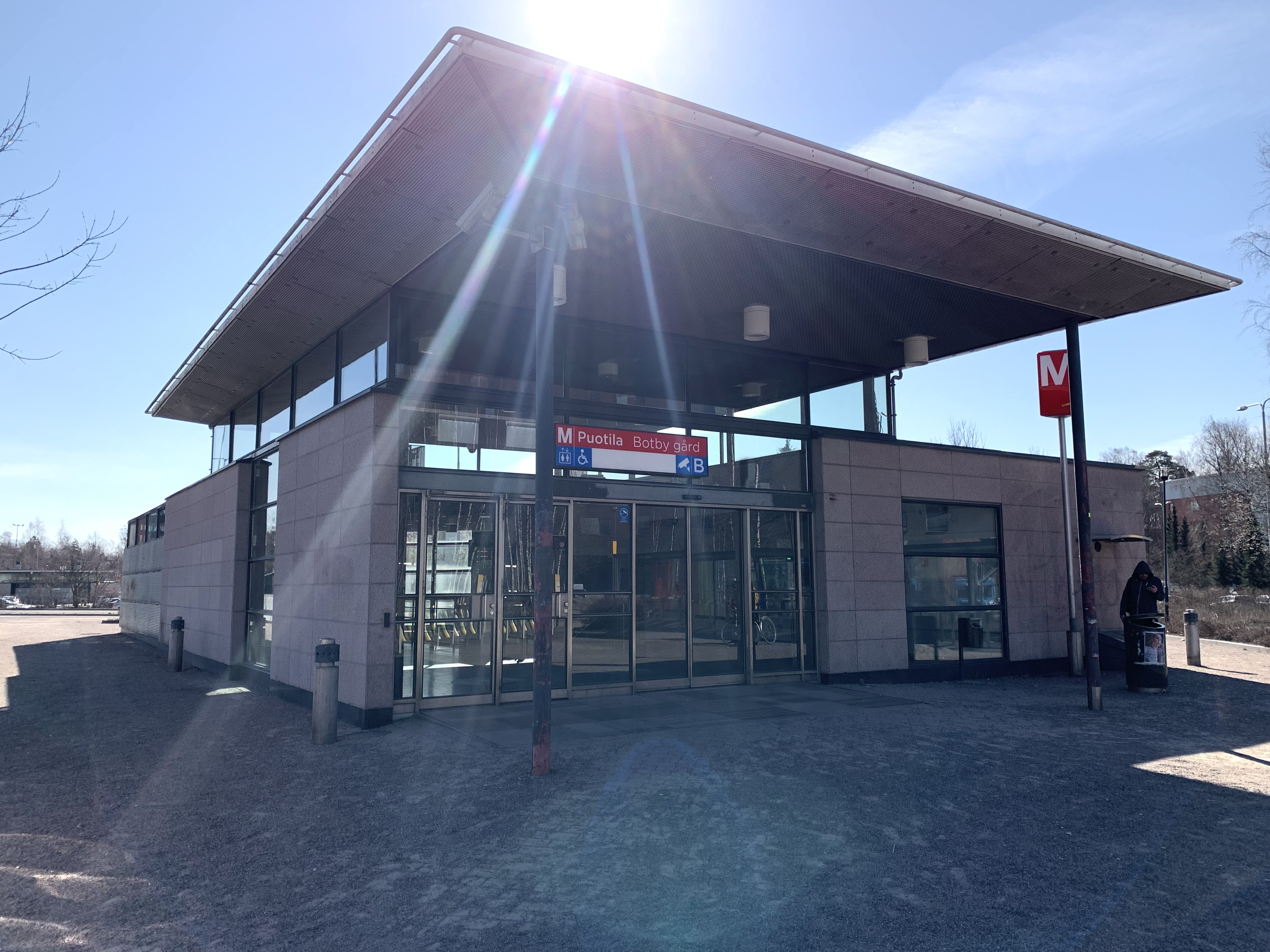
Western entrance

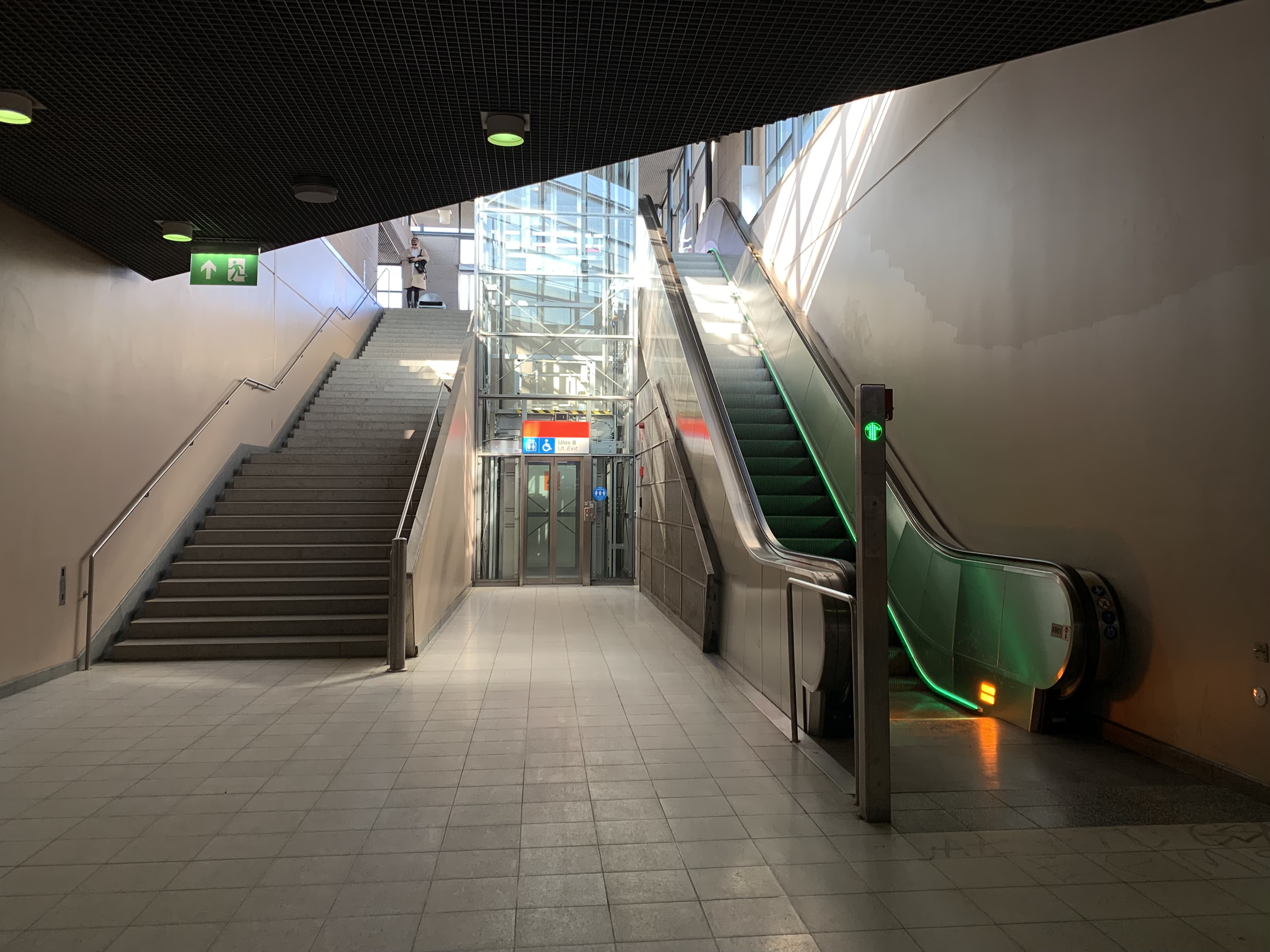
Escalators, stairs and an elevator
