= List of Helsinki Metro stations =

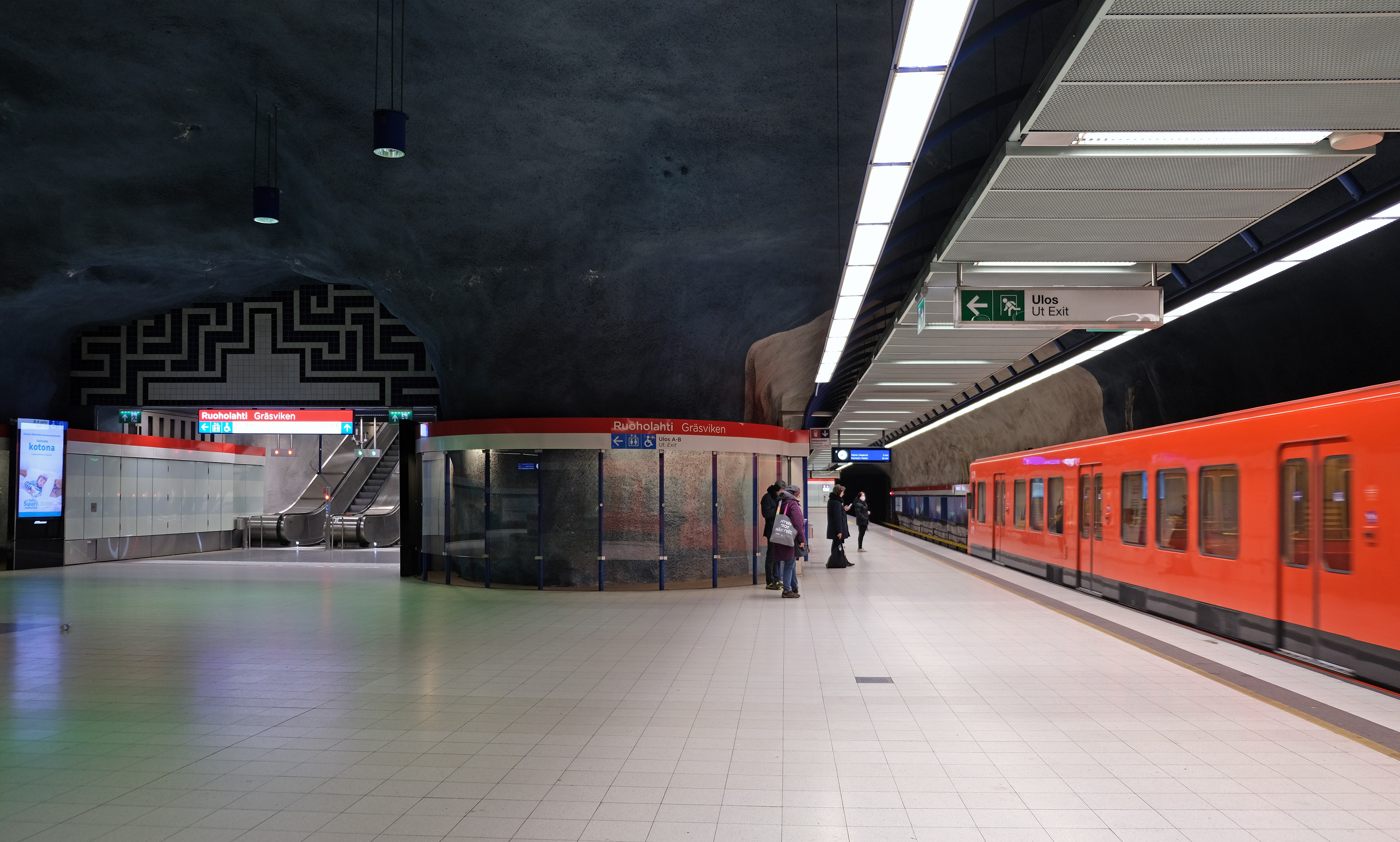
A train at Ruoholahti metro station.

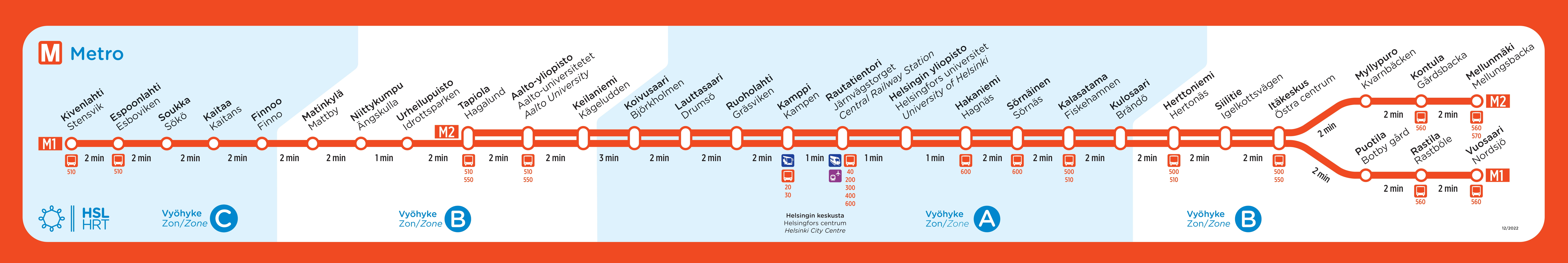
Helsinki Metro map 2022

The Helsinki Metro is a metro system in Helsinki, Finland. It was opened on 2 August 1982 and remains the only metro system in Finland and the furthest north in the world. It is operated by Helsinki City Transport (HKL) for Helsinki Regional Transport Authority (HSL) and carries over 60 million passengers per year (62.8 million in 2017).

The system contains 2 lines (M1 and M2) with 30 stations along a total length of 43 kilometres (27 mi), running from southern Espoo via central Helsinki to the East Helsinki suburbs. 21 of the stations are located in tunnels, including every station west of Sörnäinen as well as Puotila and Itäkeskus. Every other station is on the surface or elevated. The Länsimetro extension continues the line into western Helsinki and the neighbouring municipality of Espoo. The system has two depots, located in Roihupelto, Helsinki and Sammalvuori, Espoo.

== Current metro lines ==
These are the stations on the current metro line. The names are listed first in Finnish, then in Swedish (and English, if applicable^{1}). Bus transfers are not listed.

Station	Opened	Transfer	Grade	Boardings per Weekday 2025
Mellunmäki; Mellungsbacka	1989	—	Elevated	8300
Kontula; Gårdsbacka	1986	—	At-grade	7800
Myllypuro; Kvarnbäcken	1986	—	At-grade	6800
Vuosaari; Nordsjö	1998	—	At-grade	6000
Rastila; Rastböle	1998	—	At-grade	2600
Puotila; Botby gård	1998	—	Underground	3800
Itäkeskus; Östra centrum	1982	Light rail: 15	At-grade	15800
Siilitie; Igelkottsvägen	1982	—	Elevated	4700
Herttoniemi; Hertonäs	1982	—	At-grade	14300
Kulosaari; Brändö	1982	—	At-grade	3200
Kalasatama; Fiskehamnen	2007	Tram: 13	Elevated	12500
Sörnäinen; Sörnäs	1984	Tram: 1 6 7 8	Underground	17200
Hakaniemi; Hagnäs	1982	Tram: 3 6 7 9	Underground	8300
Helsingin yliopisto Helsingfors universitet / University of Helsinki	1995	Tram: 3 6 9	Underground	11100
Rautatientori; Järnvägstorget / Central Railway Station	1982	Tram: 1 2 3 4 5 6 7 9 10; Commuter rail	Underground	25600
Kamppi; Kampen	1983	Tram: 2 7 9	Underground	22400
Ruoholahti; Gräsviken	1993	Tram: 8	Underground	9800
Lauttasaari; Drumsö	2017	—	Underground	8500
Koivusaari; Björkholmen	2017	—	Underground	1100
Keilaniemi; Kägeludden	2017	Light rail: 15	Underground	2300
Aalto-yliopisto; Aalto-universitetet / Aalto University	2017	Light rail: 15	Underground	10200
Tapiola; Hagalund	2017	—	Underground	9000
Urheilupuisto; Idrottsparken	2017	—	Underground	4200
Niittykumpu; Ängskulla	2017	—	Underground	4700
Matinkylä; Mattby	2017	—	Underground	9600
Finnoo; Finno	2022	—	Underground	2600
Kaitaa; Kaitans	2022	—	Underground	1100
Soukka; Sökö	2022	—	Underground	2600
Espoonlahti; Esboviken	2022	—	Underground	2900
Kivenlahti; Stensvik	2022	—	Underground	3300

Tram lines as of 3 May 2021. References:

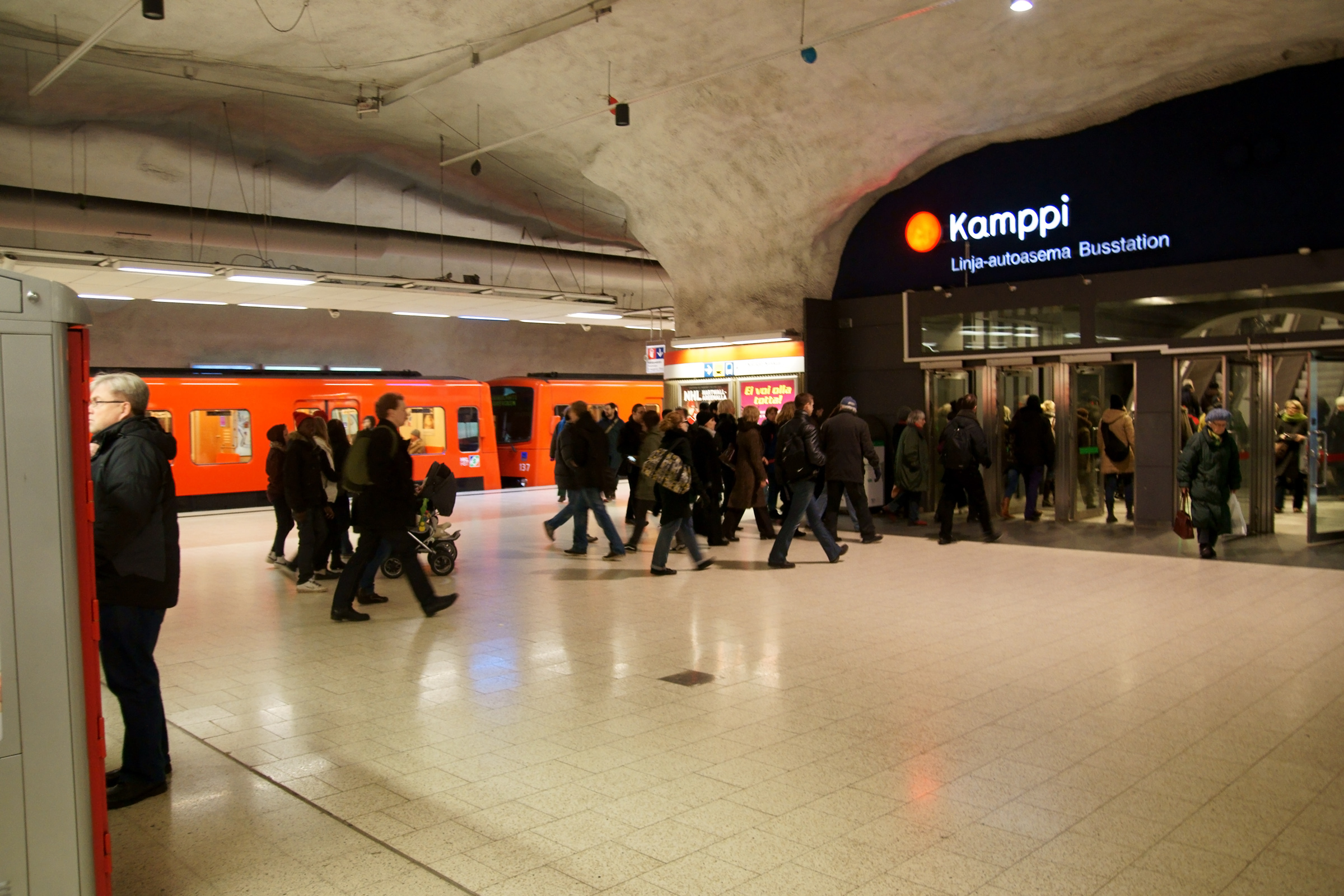
Commuters at Kamppi station

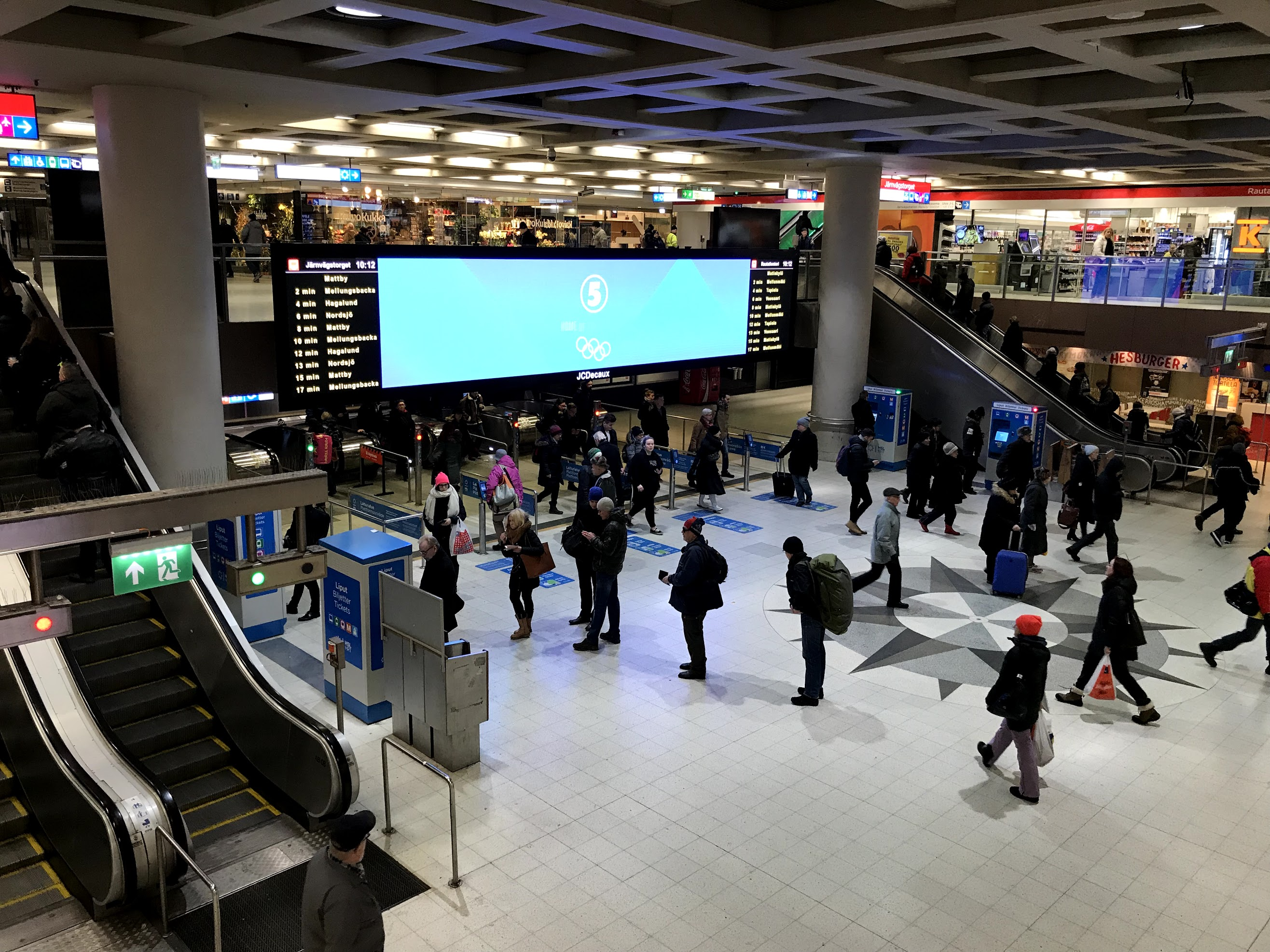
The entrance to Rautatientori station

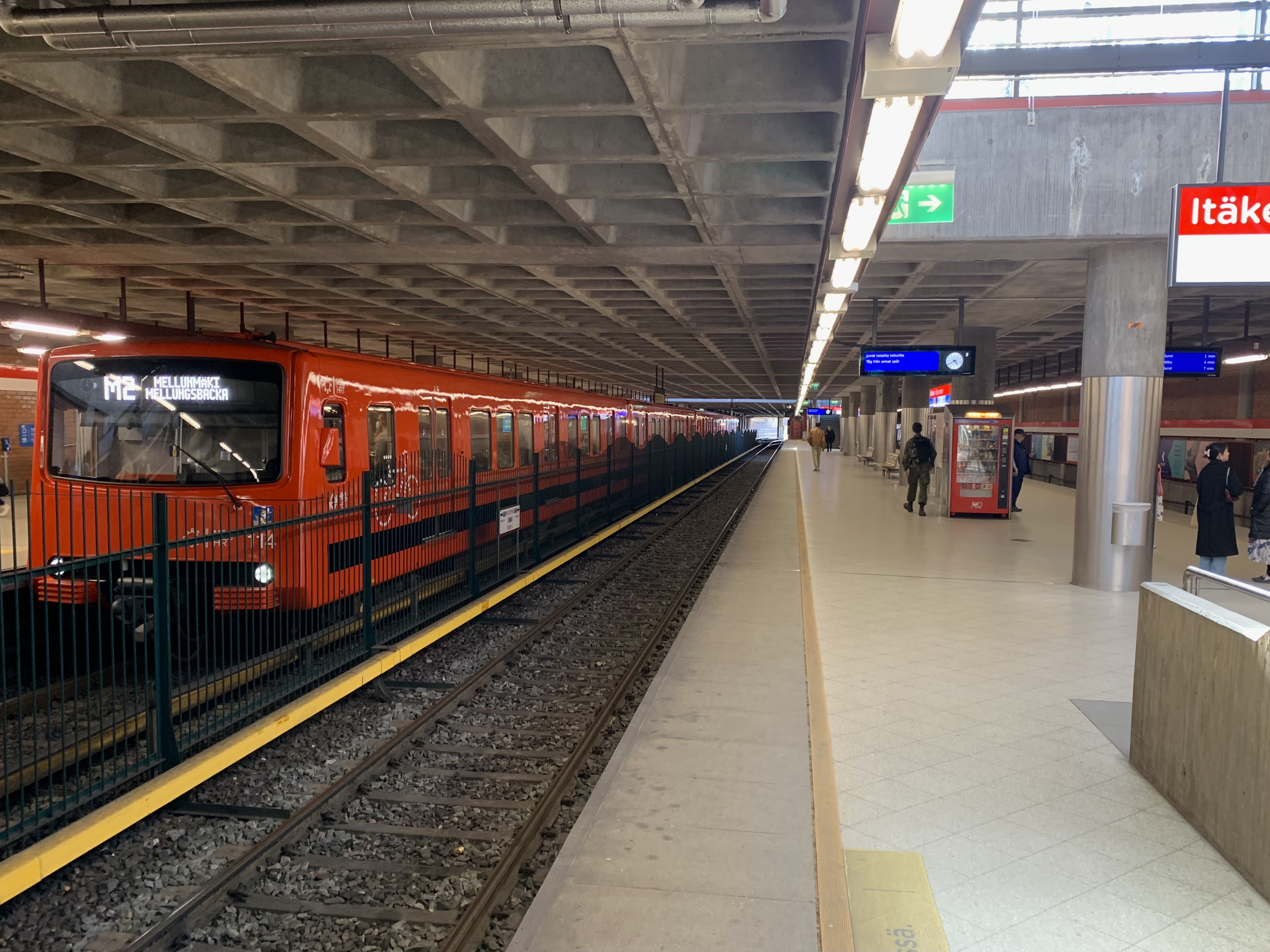
The metro line branches at Itäkeskus station

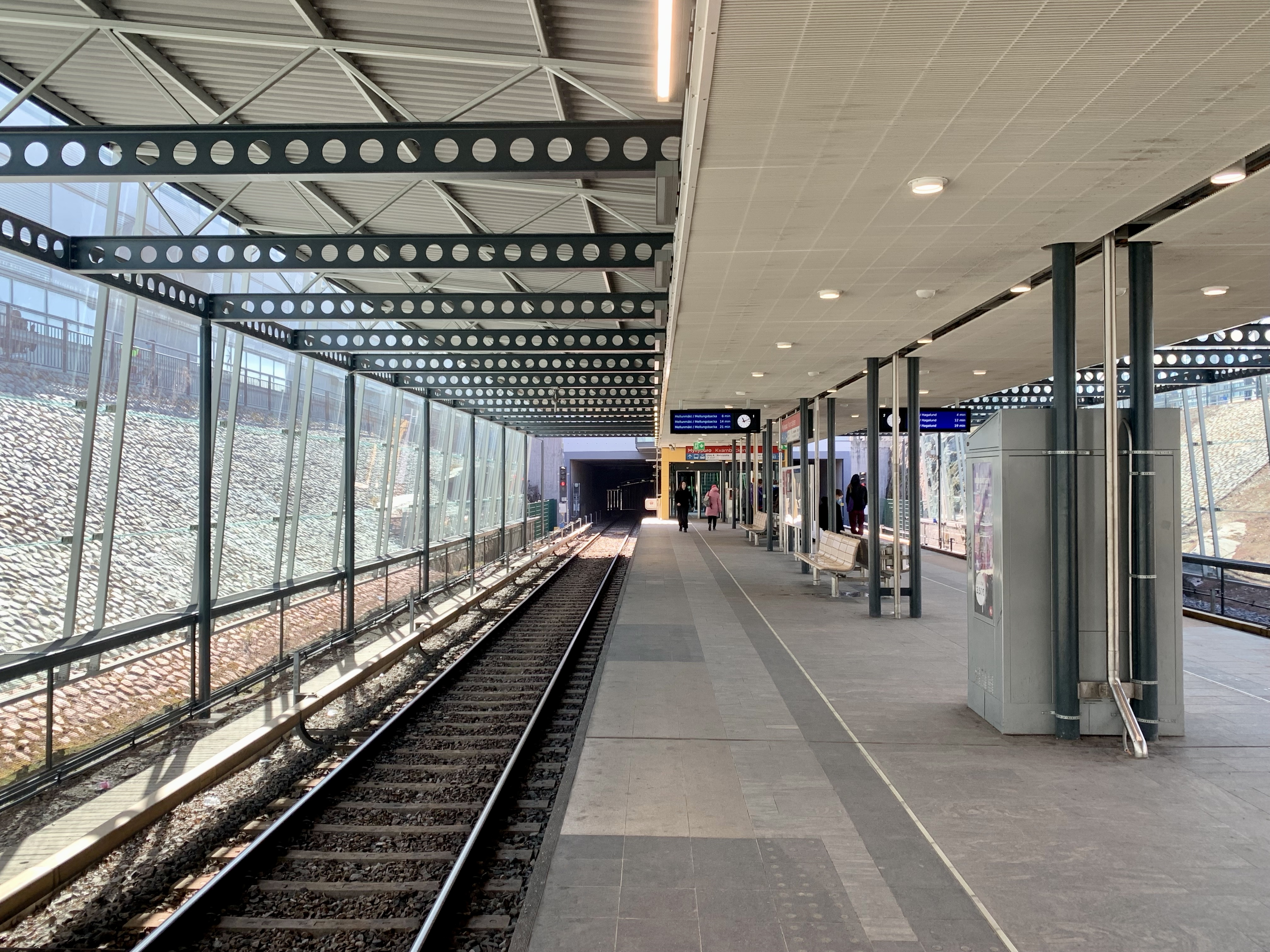
Myllypuro station

== Planned expansions ==
These are lines that have been proposed or are undergoing planning. Existing metro stations are shown in bold.

=== Itämetro ===
A map of the Itämetro extension.

An eastern extension is currently being planned, with construction being slated to start in the early 2030s. The currently prevailing proposal extends the metro eastwards from the current terminus at Mellunmäki, with proposed stations in Länsisalmi in Vantaa and Salmenkallio, Östersundom and Sakarinmäki in Helsinki, terminating at Majvik in Sipoo. Four of the stations would be underground. Other possible stations include Vantaa's Länsimäki and Helsinki's Gumböle. The municipality of Sipoo has also explored other routes and possible further extensions, to Sibbesborg and Eriksnäs.

=== Other proposed lines ===
A map of Helsinki showing the Itämetro extension and different possible paths for the second metro line.

Santahamina - Airport (the second metro line)

- Santahamina (Sandhamn)
- Gunillantie (Gunillavägen)
- Laajasalo (Degerö)
- Kruunuvuorenranta (Kronbergsstranden)
- Katajanokka (Skatudden)
- Kauppatori (Salutorget)
- Esplanadi (Esplanaden)
- **Kamppi** (Kampen)
- Töölö (Tölö)
- Olympic Stadium (Olympiastadion)
- Meilahti (Mejlans)
- Pasila (Böle)
- Olympiakylä (Olympiabyn)
- Metsälä (Krämertskog)
- Maunula (Månsas)
- Pakila (Baggböle)
- Paloheinä (Svedängen)
- Tammisto (Rosendal)
- Kartanonkoski (Herrgårdsforsen)
- Vantaanportti (Vandaport)
- Aviapolis
- Airport (Lentokenttä / Flygstation)

Pasila - Viikki (a branch of the second line)

- Pasila (Böle)
- Kumpula (Gumtäkt)
- Vanhakaupunki (Gammelstaden)
- Viikki (Vik)

== Munkkivuori ==
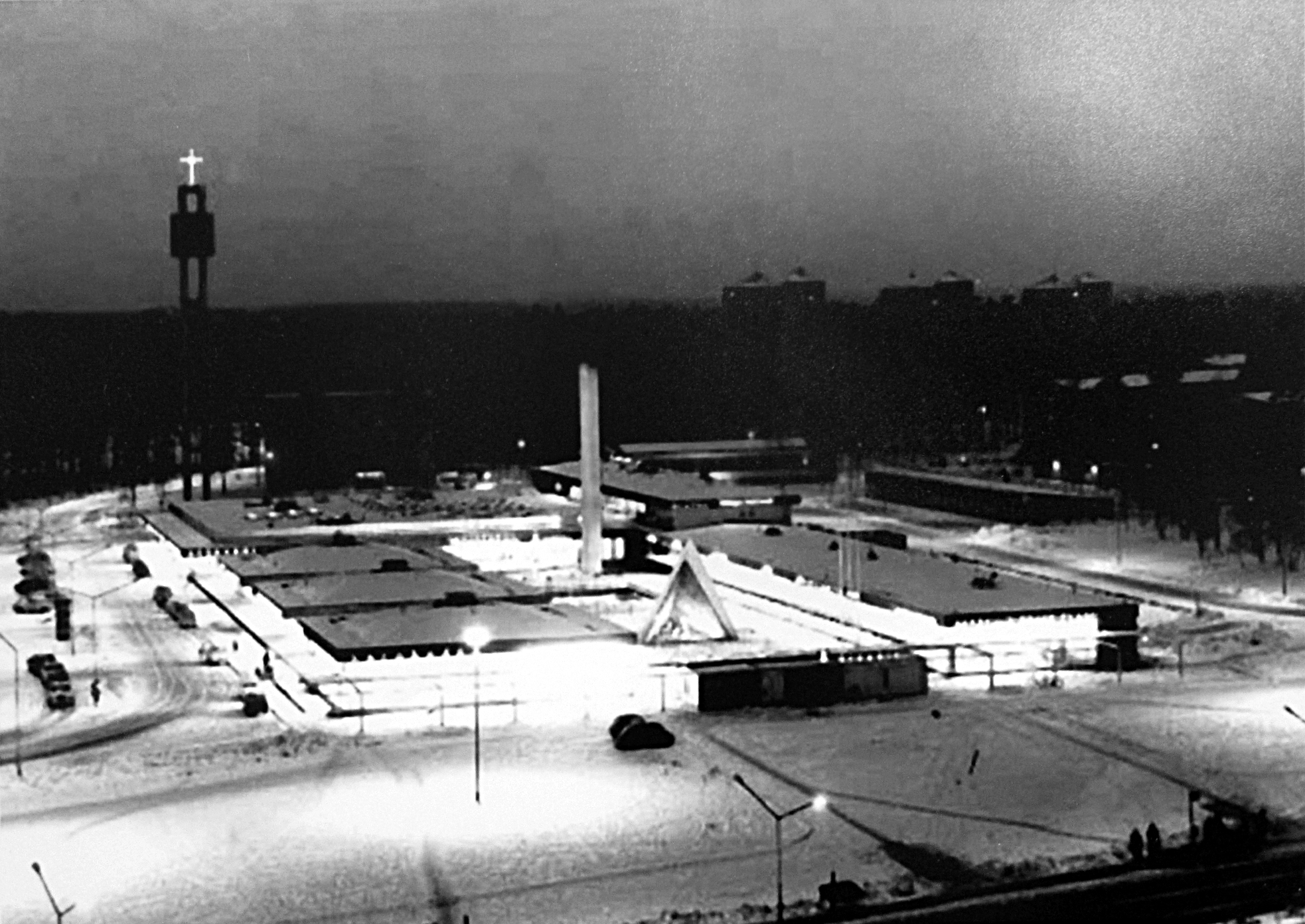
Munkkivuori shopping center around the time of opening in late 1959 or early 1960.

A tunnel for the first metro station in Helsinki was dug in 1964 under Munkkivuori shopping center in concordance with the city's first light rail-based metro plans. These would have produced of a network of over 90 kilometres (56 mi). No metro line has ever reached this unfinished station, consisting of 0.5 km (0.31 mi) long tunnels dug in bedrock. There are no plans of connecting the station to the existing network. The tunnel was flooded due to a water pipe breakage in January 2010, two months after a similar incident at the Rautatientori station.

== Notes ==
- ^1 The three stations on the Helsinki Metro that have an English name that is different from its Finnish name are Central Railway Station (Rautatientori), University of Helsinki (Helsingin yliopisto), and Aalto University (Aalto-yliopisto).
