= Tapiola metro station =

Helsinki Metro station

Tapiola Hagalund
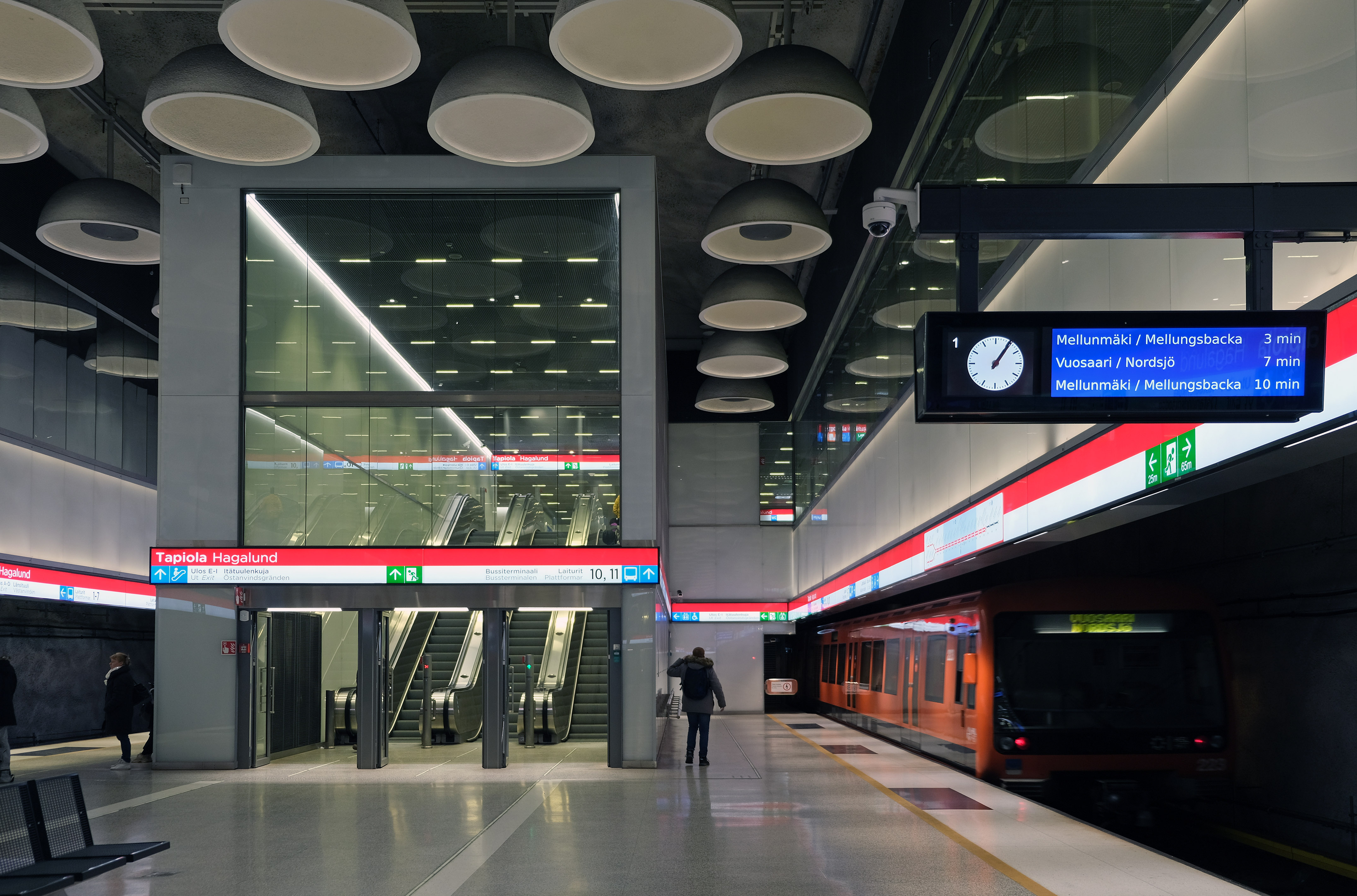

General information
- Location: Shopping center Ainoa, MerituulentieTapiola, Espoo
- Coordinates: 60°10′30″N 24°48′12″E
- System: Helsinki Metro station
- Platforms: Island platform
- Tracks: 2
- Connections: HSL buses 111, 112, 113/N, 114/N, 115/, 116, 117, 118/B/N, 119, 124/K, 125/K/N, 510 548, 549

Construction
- Structure type: Deep single-vault
- Depth: 30 metres (98 ft)
- Accessible: B

History
- Opened: 18 November 2017

Passengers
- 13,200 daily

Services
Preceding station	Helsinki Metro	Following station
Urheilupuisto towards Kivenlahti	M1	Aalto University towards Vuosaari
Terminus	M2	Aalto University towards Mellunmäki
Location

Tapiola (Finnish) or Hagalund (Swedish) is an underground station on the western extension (Länsimetro) of the Helsinki Metro, in the Otaniemi district of Espoo, Finland. The station is located 1.3 kilometres east of Urheilupuisto metro station and 1.7 kilometres southwest of Aalto University metro station.

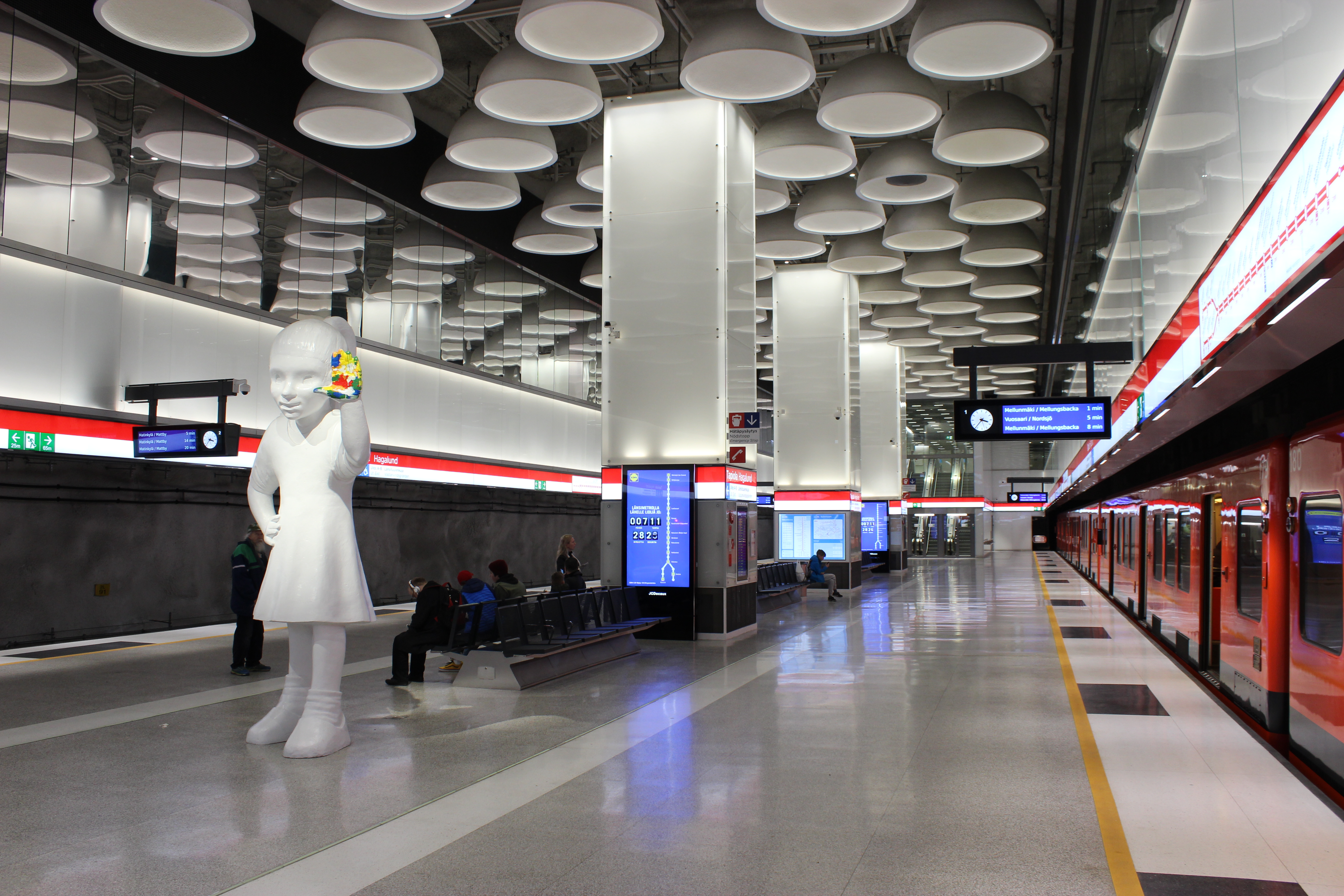
The platform area of the Tapiola metro station, with the statue "Emma jättää jäljen" ("Emma leaves a mark") on the left
