= Mellunmäki metro station =

Helsinki Metro station

Mellunmäki Mellungsbacka
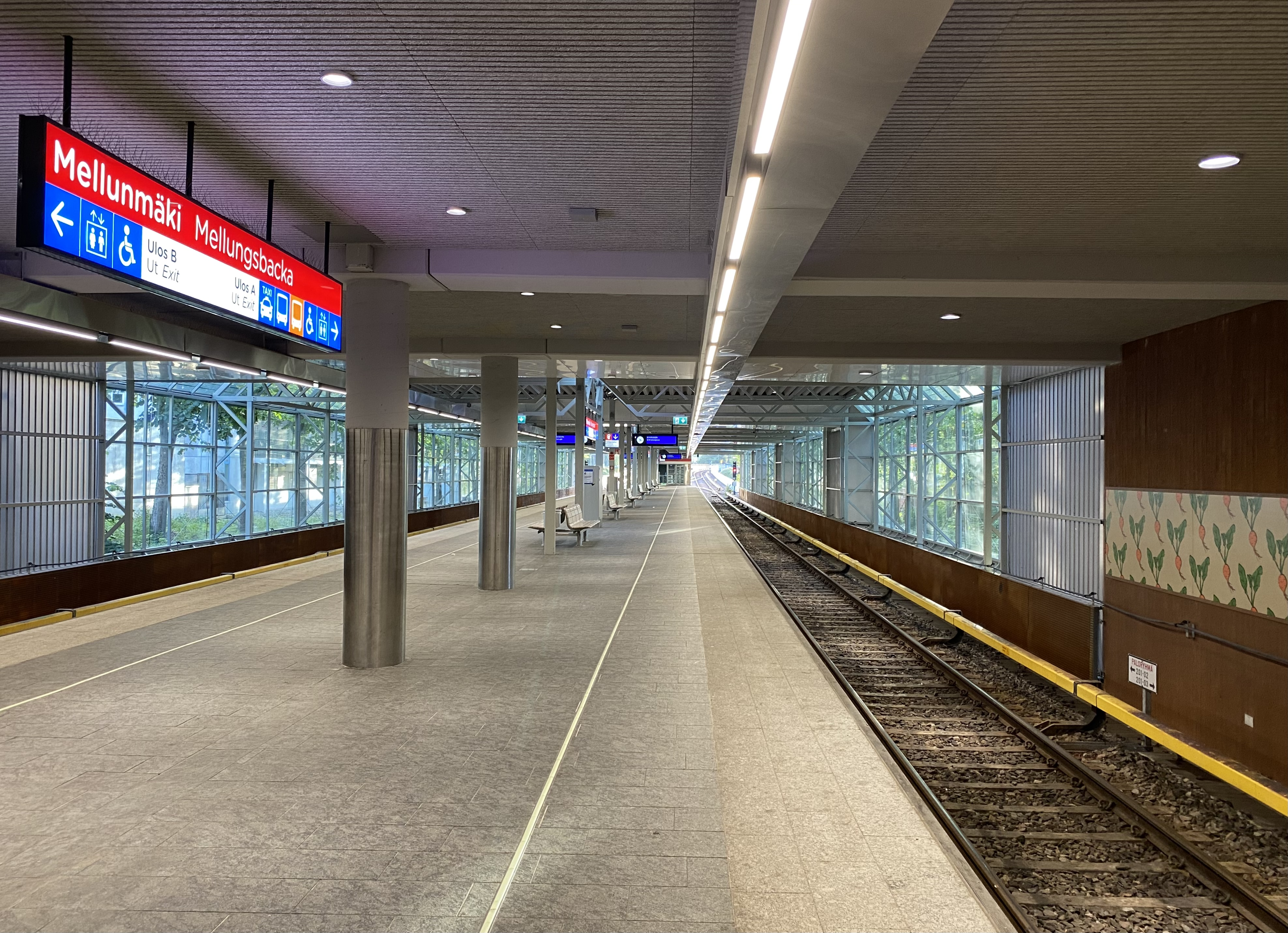

General information
- Location: Pallaksentie 3, Helsinki
- Coordinates: 60°14′21″N 25°6′39″E
- System: Helsinki Metro station
- Owner: HKL
- Platforms: Island platform
- Tracks: 2
- Connections: HSL Helsinki bus lines 95 95N 97 97N 97V 560 805 812; HSL Vantaa bus lines 570 572 587

Construction
- Structure type: Elevated
- Accessible: Yes

Other information
- Fare zone: B

History
- Opened: 1 September 1989

Passengers
- 14,000 daily

Services
Preceding station	Helsinki Metro	Following station
Kontula towards Tapiola	M2	Terminus
Location

Mellunmäki metro station (Finnish: Mellunmäen metroasema, Swedish: Mellungsbackas metrostation) is the ground-level terminus station on the M2 line of the Helsinki Metro. It serves the district of Mellunmäki in East Helsinki.

The station was opened on 1 September 1989 and was designed by architect bureau Toivo Karhunen Oy. It is located 1.6 kilometres east of Kontula.

The Mellunmäki metro station is the northernmost metro station in the world. (As a city, Espoo extends somewhat more to the north than Helsinki, but the metro stations in Espoo are more to the south.)

== Pictures ==
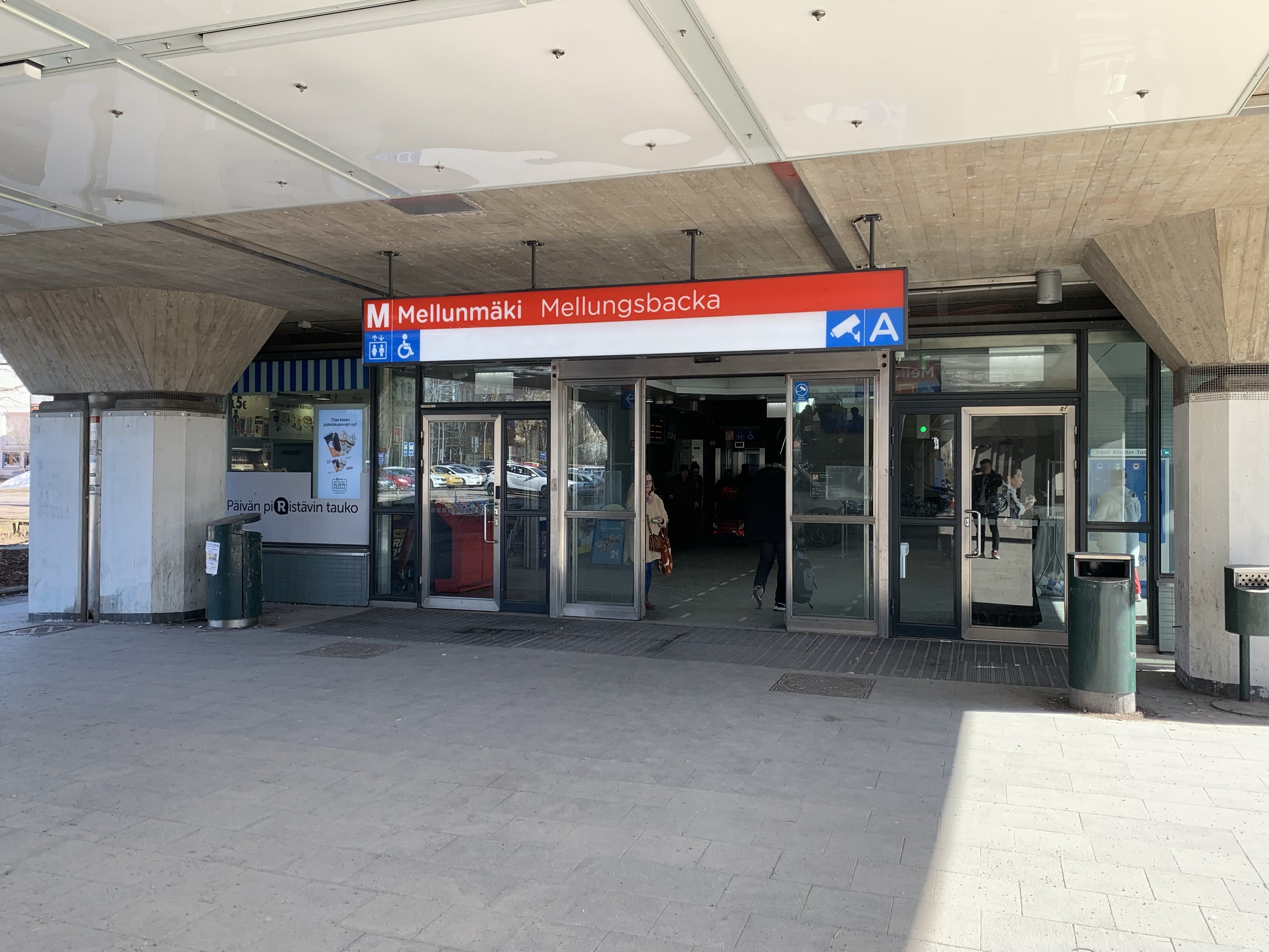
Entrance from the bus terminal

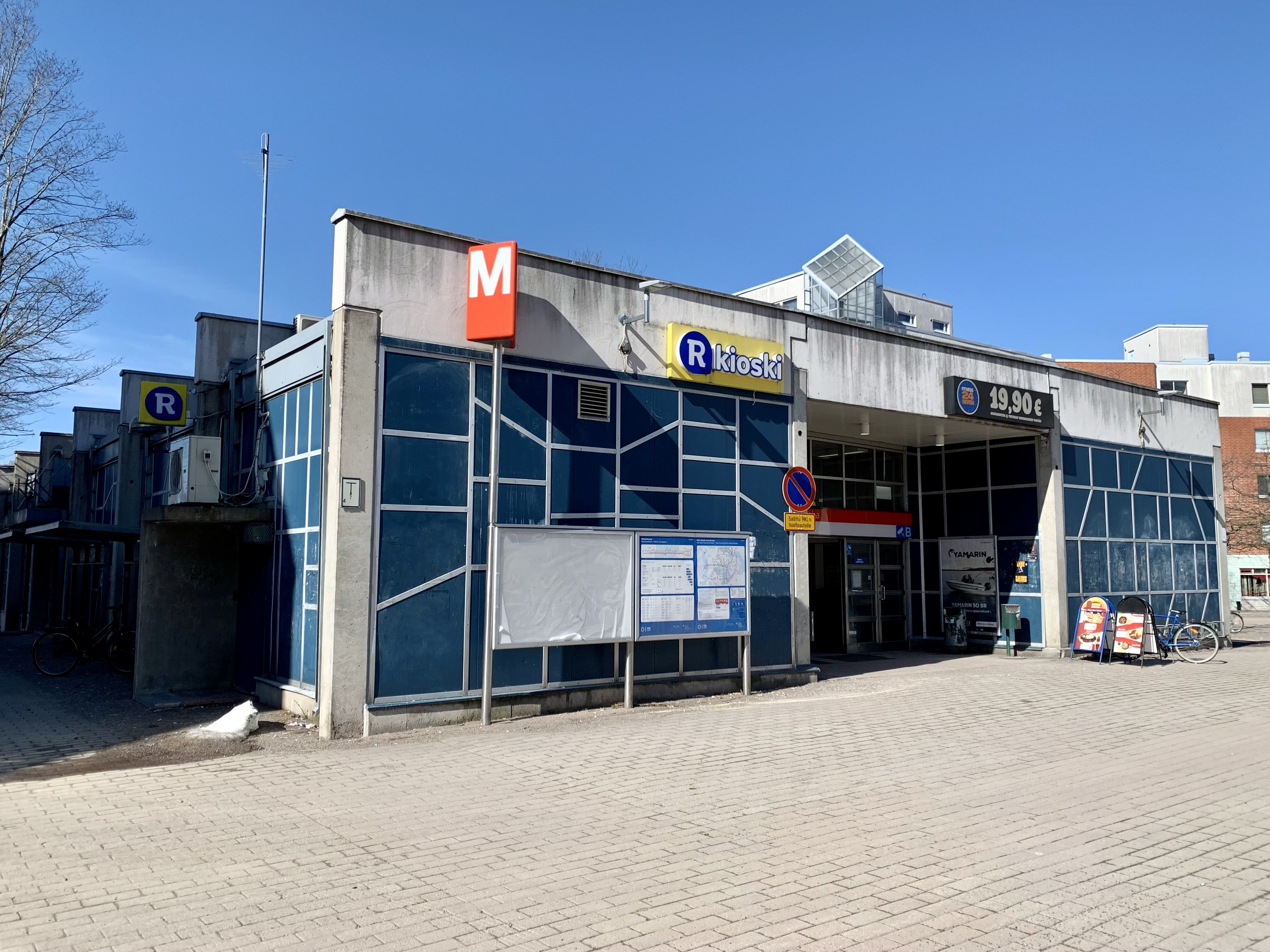
Entrance from Korvatunturinpolku

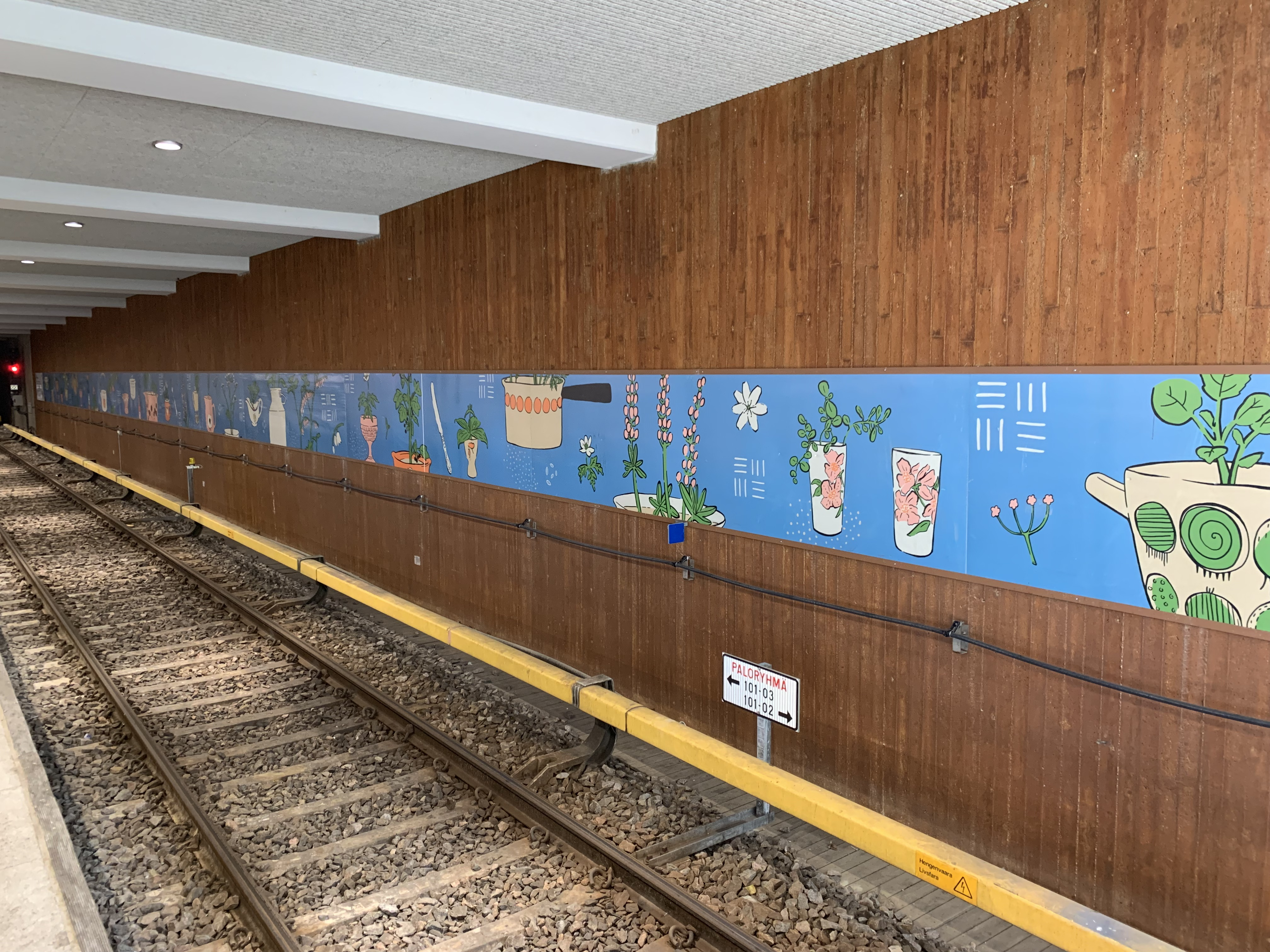
Art in the station

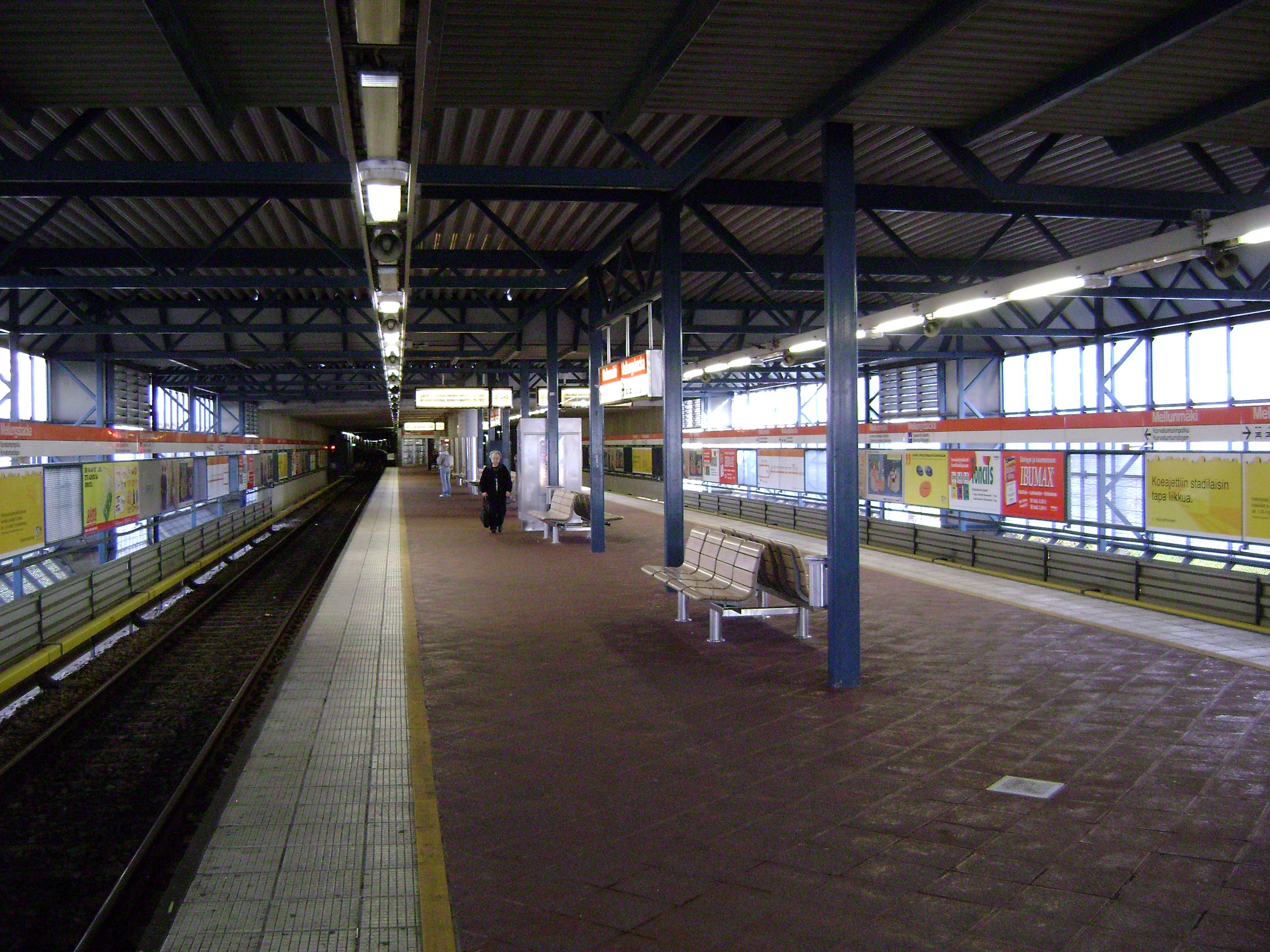
The station before renovations
