= Vuosaari metro station =

Helsinki Metro station

Vuosaari Nordsjö
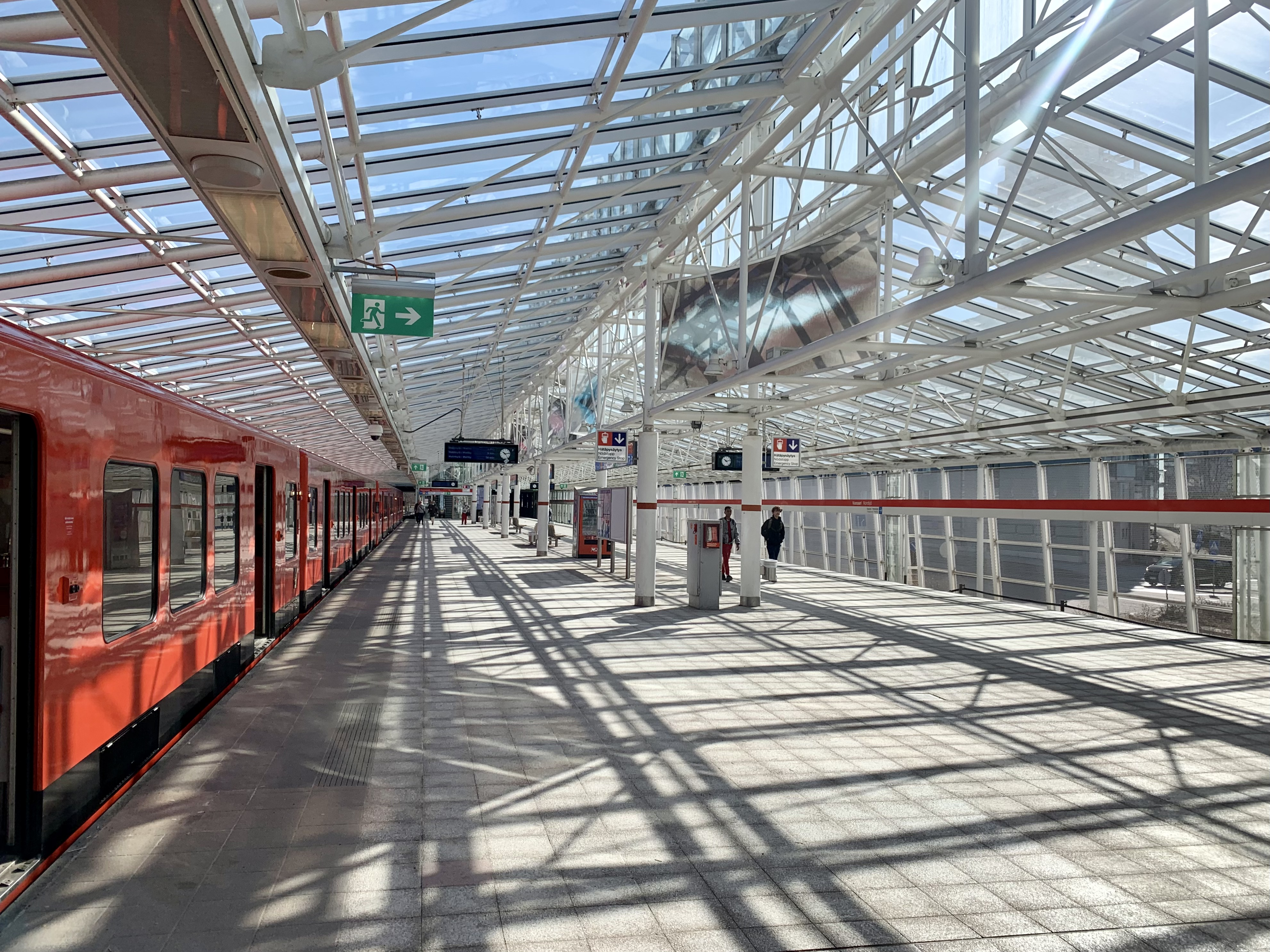

General information
- Location: Valkopaadentie 2A, Helsinki
- Coordinates: 60°12′26″N 25°8′32″E
- System: Helsinki Metro station
- Owner: HKL
- Platforms: 1
- Tracks: 2
- Connections: HSL bus lines 90 90A 90N 96 560 813-819

Construction
- Structure type: At grade
- Parking: 222
- Cycle facilities: 243
- Accessible: Yes

Other information
- Fare zone: B

History
- Opened: 31 August 1998

Passengers
- 26,800 daily

Services
Preceding station	Helsinki Metro	Following station
Rastila towards Kivenlahti	M1	Terminus
Location

Vuosaari metro station (Finnish: Vuosaaren metroasema, Swedish: Nordsjös metrostation) is the ground-level terminus station of the M1 line of the Helsinki Metro. It serves the district of Vuosaari in East Helsinki.

The station was opened on 31 August 1998 and was designed by the architect firm Esa Piironen Oy. It is located 1.2 kilometers east of Rastila metro station.

In 2011, a 1.4 kilometer-long service rail was created from the end of the Vuosaari station to Vuosaari Harbour. The service rail connects the metro track to the railway network and replaced the previous, longer service rail line that ran through the district of Viikki. The service rail has been used to move heavy maintenance and construction machinery and materials, including those that were related to the Länsimetro project.

A trial run with platform screen doors was conducted at Vuosaari. The project was delayed due to technical and safety related testing.

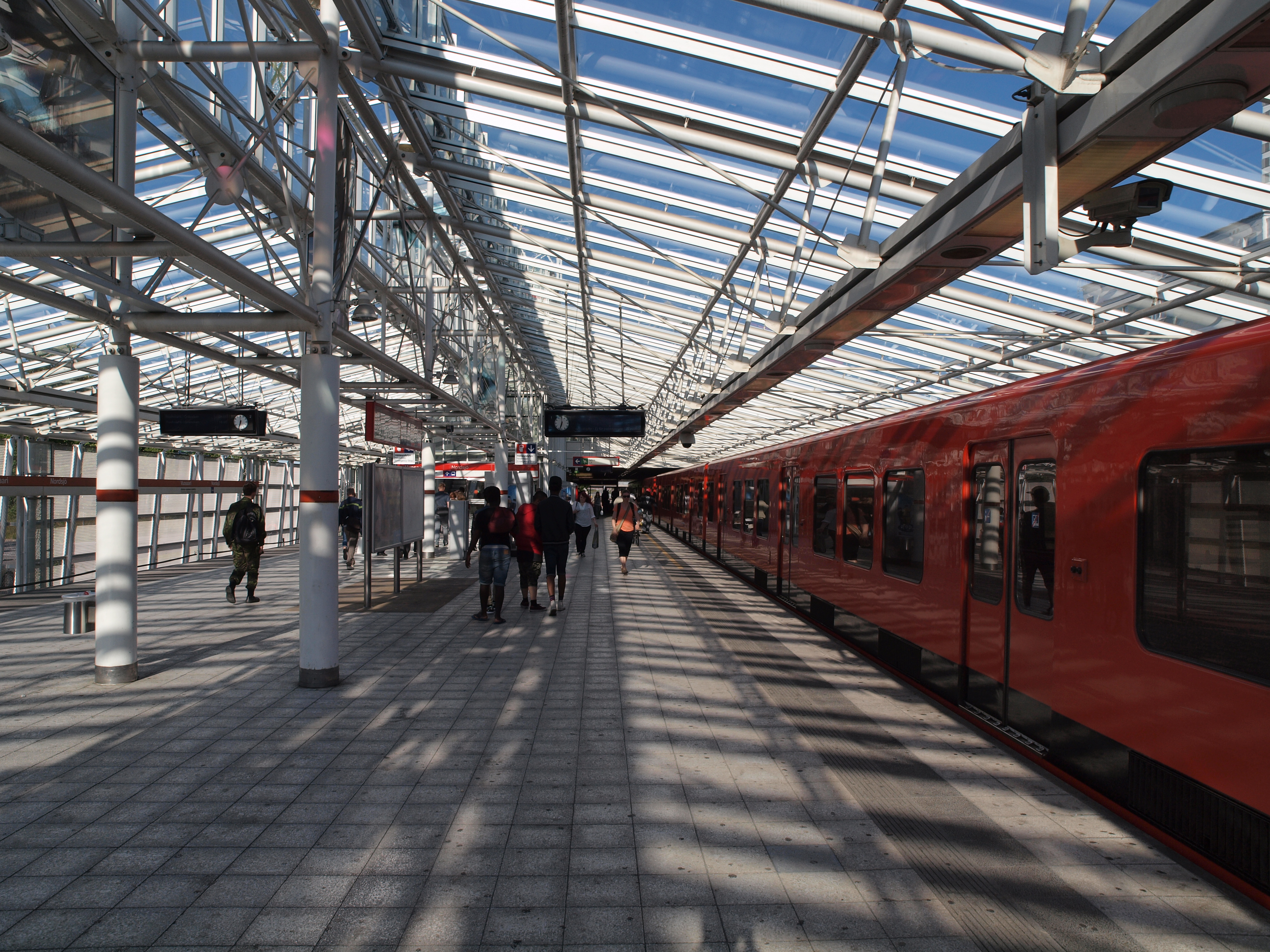
The station platform

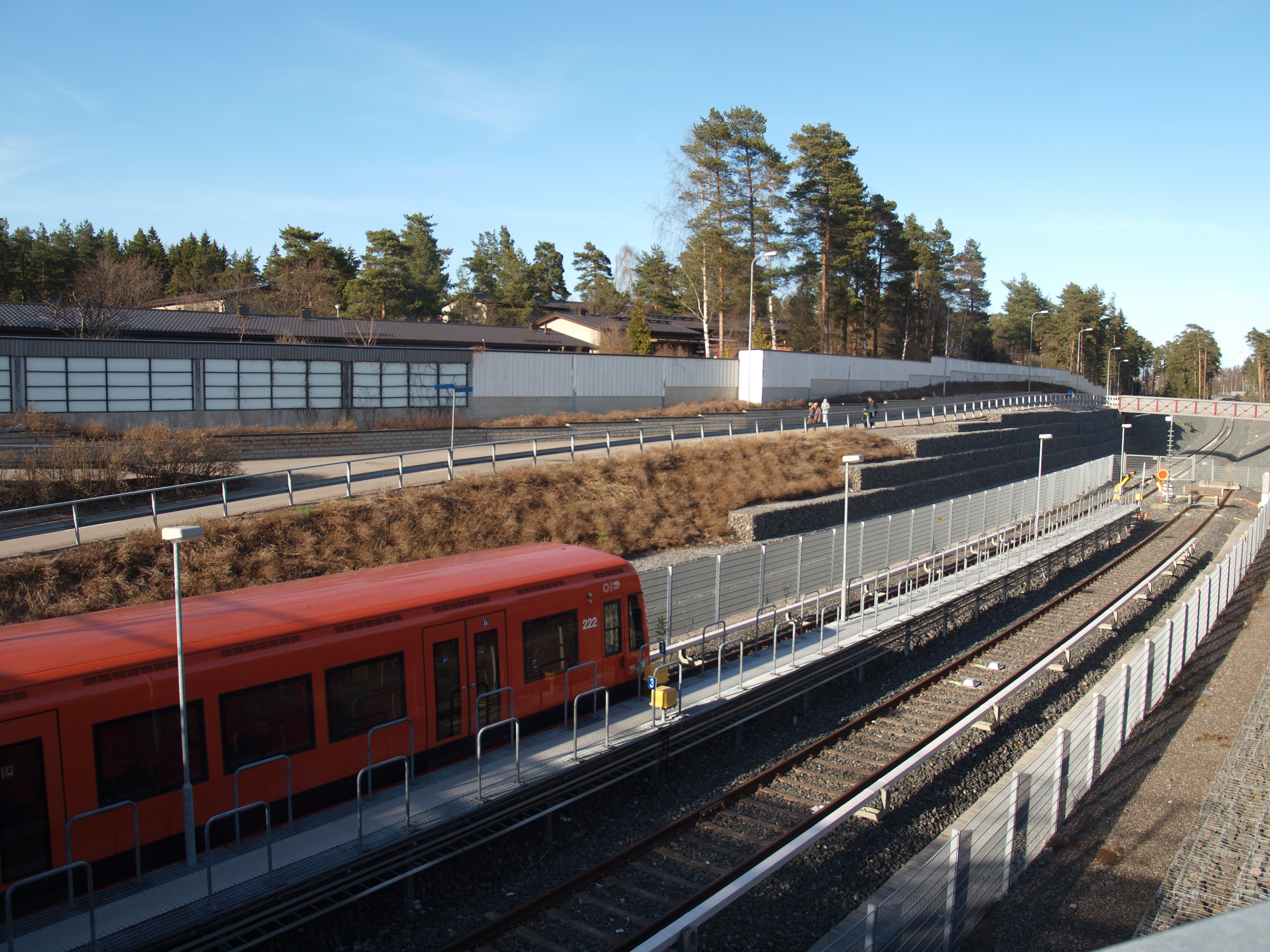
The passenger inaccessible turning track behind the station
