= Suur-Espoonlahti =

Suur-Espoonlahti Stor-Esboviken
- District of Espoo
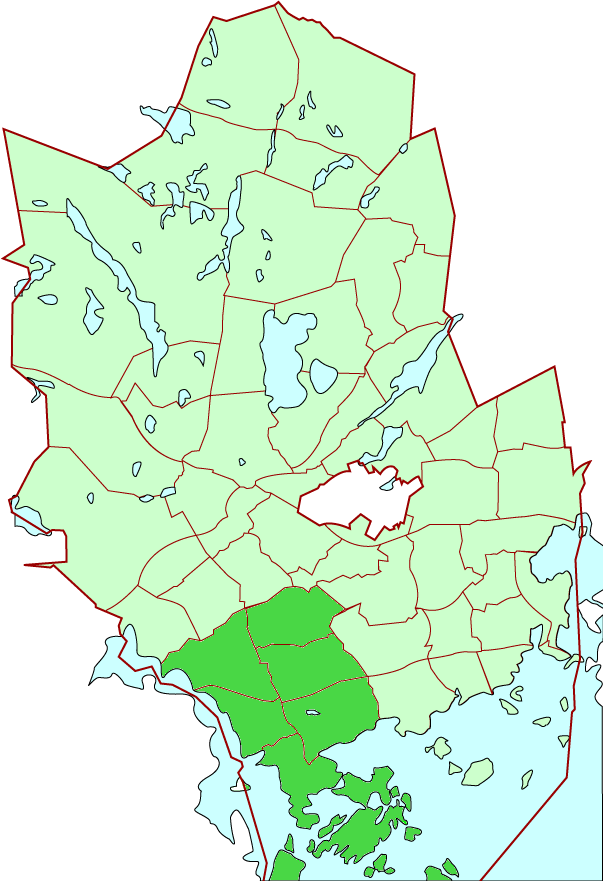
- Location of Suur-Espoonlahti within Espoo
- Coordinates: 60.15°N 24.66°E
- Country: Finland
- Municipality: Espoo
- Region: Uusimaa
- Sub-region: Greater Helsinki

Population (2005)
  - Total: 47,382

Languages
  - Finnish: 84.9 %
  - Swedish: 9.8 %
  - Other: 5.3 %

Suur-Espoonlahti (Finnish) or Stor-Esboviken (Swedish) is a south-western main district of Espoo, a city in Finland.

It contains the districts Espoonlahti, Kaitaa, Latokaski, Nöykkiö, Saunalahti, Soukka and Suvisaaristo.

It is one of the fastest-growing districts in Espoo with Suur-Leppävaara.

== See also ==
- Districts of Espoo
