= Kaitaa metro station =

Station on the Länsimetro extension of the Helsinki Metro

Coordinates: 60.148919°N 24.689904°E

Kaitaa Kaitans
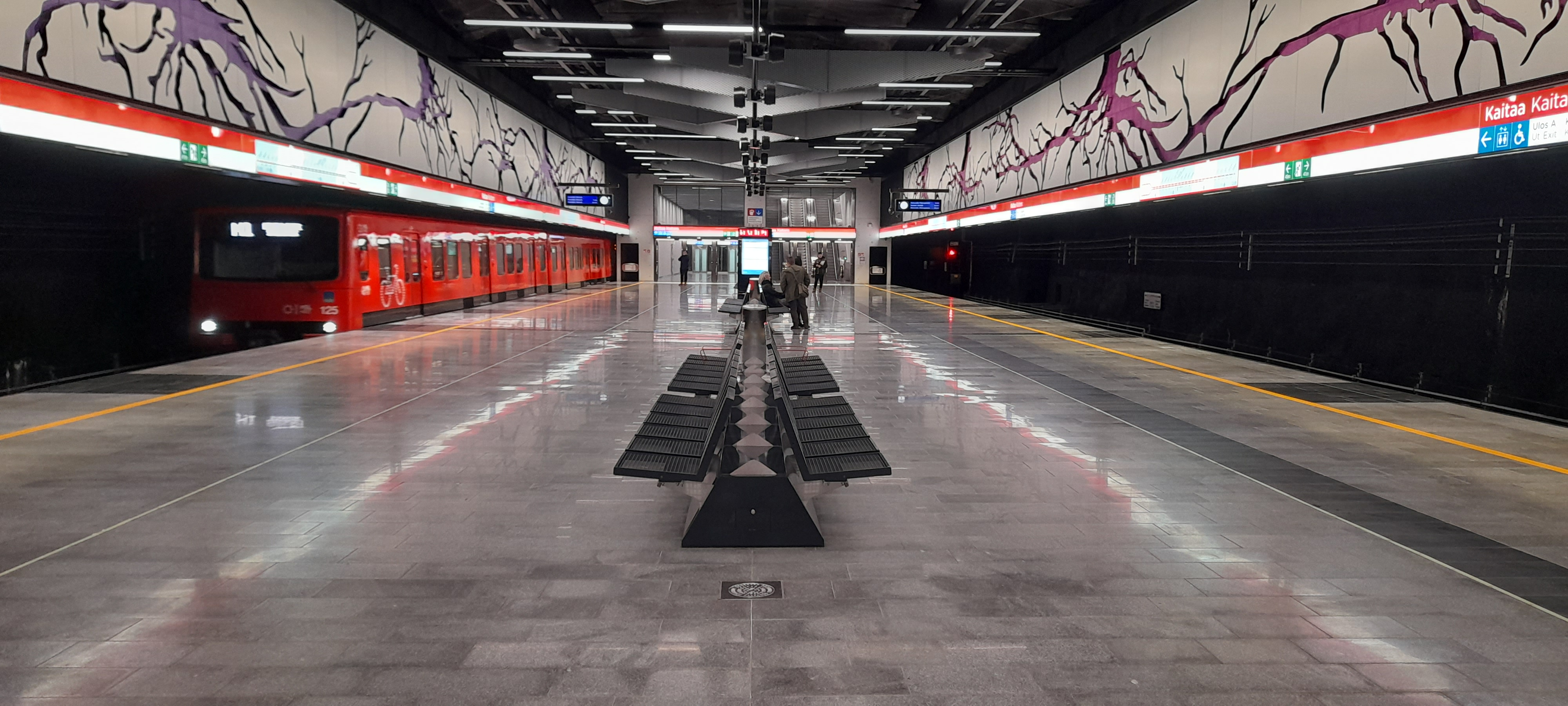
- Kaitaa metro station after opening in 2022

General information
- Location: Kaitaa, Espoo
- System: Helsinki Metro station
- Platforms: Island platform
- Tracks: 2
- Connections: HSL buses 143, 143A, 147, 147N, 148, 543, 544

Construction
- Structure type: Underground
- Depth: 14.7 metres (48 ft)
- Accessible: Yes

Other information
- Fare zone: С

History
- Opened: 3 December 2022

Services
Preceding station	Helsinki Metro	Following station
Soukka towards Kivenlahti	M1	Finnoo towards Vuosaari
Location

Kaitaa (Finnish) or Kaitans (Swedish) is an underground station on the western metro extension (Länsimetro) of the Helsinki Metro in Finland. The main entrance of the station is located at the eastern end of the block structure designed for crossing Kaitaantie and Iivisniemenkatu. The West Bank entrance is near Hannuskalli, where the preliminary land use plans have outlined further construction.

Kaitaa metro station is located in the northern part of the Iivisniemi suburb. Its architectural theme envisages lush Quarter courtyards, which refers to the characteristics of Iivisniemi. The station is opened on 3 December 2022, located 1,6 kilometres east from Soukka metro station and 1,3 kilometres west from Finnoo metro station.
