= Länsimetro =

Extension of the Helsinki Metro in Espoo, Finland

Coordinates: 60.159955°N 24.737528°E

- Logo

- Route map. Original stations of the Helsinki Metro are shown as filled squares, Länsimetro stations as hollow squares.

Overview
- Owner: Länsimetro Oy
- Locale: Helsinki, Espoo
- Transit type: Rapid Transit
- Number of stations: 13

Operation
- Began operation: 18 November 2017 (Phase 1); 3 December 2022 (Phase 2)
- Operators: Helsinki Regional Transport Authority; Helsinki City Transport
- Character: Underground

Technical
- System length: 21 km (13 mi); Ruoholahti-Matinkylä 14 km (8.7 mi); Matinkylä-Kivenlahti 7 km (4.3 mi)
- No. of tracks: 2
- Track gauge: 1,522 mm (4 ft 11 29/32 in)
- Electrification: Third Rail, 750 V DC

Länsimetro (English: Western Metro, Swedish: Västmetron) is an extension to the Helsinki Metro system in Finland, which opened on 18 November 2017. Länsimetro extends the system's two lines, M1 and M2, from Central Helsinki to the neighbouring city of Espoo. The new stretch continues the lines from the existing Ruoholahti station via the island of Lauttasaari, the Aalto University Otaniemi campus and Tapiola, the terminus of line M2. Line M1 continues further west to Matinkylä. Unlike previous extensions to the Helsinki Metro system, Länsimetro runs entirely underground. The second phase opened on 3 December 2022 and continues the line further west to Kivenlahti, near the municipal border of Kirkkonummi.

Final approval for a 13.5-kilometre (8.4 mi) route was granted on 4 April 2007, and construction began in November 2009. In February 2014, rock blasting was completed, and the fitting out of the tunnels and construction of the stations was started. The opening of the extension was planned for August 2016, but was delayed until November 2017.

== Background ==
The first designs for a metro system in Helsinki, made in the 1950s, already contained lines to Espoo. After the two forks of the metro line in eastern Helsinki had been completed in 1998, the city of Helsinki continued to pursue the Länsimetro proposal, but the city of Espoo continued to reject it until the early 2000s.

After Helsinki, Espoo is the second most populous city in Finland, served by roads, bus transport, and commuter trains, but previously not connected to the metro system. It is connected to Helsinki by the Rantarata coastal railway and by two motorways: Finnish national road 1 (Turun moottoritie, to Turku) in the middle and the Western Highway (the Länsiväylä) in the south, near the coast. As the primary passageway between southern Espoo and central Helsinki, the Länsiväylä has been repeatedly enlarged to cope with congestion, but still experiences chronic traffic jams during morning rush hours.

Since the 1990s, the Finnish state and the city of Helsinki had been willing to finance a part of the Länsimetro project and prepared to commence construction. However, Espoo opposed the project for a long time, mainly because of the cost: the state had only agreed to pay 30% of the costs, while Espoo wanted them to contribute at least 70%.

== Espoo's decision ==
In 1997, Helsinki made an official proposal to Espoo to construct the Länsimetro. A year later, on 8 December 1998, Espoo city council decided to support the extension only to Tapiola, rejecting a continuation to Matinkylä and Kivenlahti. On 16 February 1999, the city council changed its mind, and voted 48 to 18 in support of building the extension to Matinkylä. (These decisions did not yet authorize construction. In June 2012, Espoo was keen on continuing the line from Matinkylä to Kivenlahti as soon as possible, wishing to commence the construction of this second phase even before the first phase entered service.)

The issue of the extension was revived in 2002, when the Helsinki Metropolitan Area Council (YTV) was drafting a new master plan for public transportation in the Helsinki area. Counter to the view taken by Espoo city council, YTV prioritised the Länsimetro over the construction of a light railway between Helsinki and Espoo. A compromise solution was reached, as an investigation into the alternative of constructing such a light rail line was added to the plan, with a proposed construction schedule from 2010 to 2020.

According to a survey commissioned by Helsingin Sanomat in late 2005, 77% of Espoo residents and 90% of Helsinki residents were in favour of the Länsimetro.

On 25 September 2006, Espoo city council approved the construction of the Länsimetro by a vote of 45 to 19. In its decision, the council set a number of conditions for the project:

- The Finnish state must commit to financing the Länsimetro extension all the way to Kivenlahti.
- The existing heavy railway line between Leppävaara and Espoo Centre should be widened from double-track to triple-track, in conjunction with the Länsimetro project.
- The orbital Jokeri bus line should be converted to a light rail line/tram as soon as possible.
- The orbital Kehä I ring road should be improved.
- The orbital Kehä II ring road should be extended into Helsinki via Vihdintie to Hämeenlinnanväylä.

After the construction decision by Espoo city council, allowing city taxes to be used for the project, critics of the decision expressed concern that such a large construction project could conceivably bankrupt the city, and sued the city in the Supreme Administrative Court of Finland for alleged neglect in decision-making. Since administrative courts cannot rule on the substance of the decision, only the formal procedure was questioned. The court rejected the complaint.

== Länsimetro Oy and Helsinki's decision ==
In June 2007, the cities of Espoo and Helsinki jointly founded a company called Länsimetro Oy (English: "Western Metro Ltd.") to construct the extension. Espoo owns 72% of the company's stock and Helsinki owns 28%. Matti Kokkinen was appointed as the company's CEO. Following disputes related to the delayed opening of the first phase in August 2016, Ville Saksi replaced Kokkinen as CEO on 14 November 2016.

On 11 November 2009, Helsinki city council approved construction of the Länsimetro, which started on 24 November 2009. Judicial complaints and appeals postponed the start for over a year, but all were rejected by the Supreme Administrative Court. As of June 2012, Finnish courts have rejected all charges made against the extension.

== Controversy and alternatives ==
In 2002, a joint study by the city of Helsinki, the city of Espoo, and the Ministry of Transport and Communications, compared the impact of the metro extension with that of building a bus rapid transit system. The running costs of the systems were estimated to be roughly equivalent. The metro extension would reduce emissions in Helsinki, but feeder buses would increase them in Espoo. The metro would make it faster and more convenient to travel to Helsinki from the parts of Espoo near the new stations, but would increase the travel time from outlying areas.

A second study by the same parties, published in 2004, investigated the alternative option of a light rail line.

In 2006, an informal private-sector shadow plan for a light rail alternative called TramWest was released. According to its critics, the plan underestimated costs and that the line was partly placed in areas where it would have been impossible to implement. TramWest also included many level crossings, which, if done badly, would slow down public transport. The proposed tracks would also have cut through the parks next to the Kiasma museum and the Helsinki Music Centre, and all the lines would have terminated at the Elielinaukio square next to the central railway station, without being integrated with any existing or future rail system. A revised version of the plan was released in early 2008, claiming to address most of these concerns. It proposed connecting Espoo with both the Länsiväylä and with Helsinki's city centre, with the eastern terminus being relocated to either Viikki or Laajasalo.

== Cost ==
Preliminary plans, made in 2000 and 2001, estimated the cost of building the infrastructure for the metro extension to Matinkylä to be about €400 million. When Espoo city council decided on construction of the metro in 2004, the estimated cost was €452 million. In September 2007, the estimated cost of the Länsimetro was at least €530 million. In December 2007, Olavi Louko estimated that the cost would rise to at least €600 million. According to Louko, the cost of the excavation work had risen a third more than that of other ground construction work, due to security requirements and the increase in simultaneous excavation work elsewhere, including the construction of the Kehärata (Ring Rail Line) in nearby Vantaa.

By January 2008, the estimated cost had risen to over €800 million, and by February 2014, to about €1 billion.

== Route ==
A metro line extension was accepted as a basis for further planning in 2000. The locations of the stations were confirmed by the cities of Espoo and Helsinki in June 2007. The extension runs underground for its entire length. The stations are:

The Ruoholahti–Matinkylä section (the first three stations in Helsinki, the others in Espoo; Swedish station names in brackets):

- Ruoholahti (Gräsviken) (existing station)
- Lauttasaari (Drumsö)
- Koivusaari (Björkholmen) (last station in Helsinki)
- Keilaniemi (Kägeludden) (first station in Espoo)
- Aalto-yliopisto (Aalto-universitetet) (Aalto University)
- Tapiola (Hagalund)
- Urheilupuisto (Idrottsparken)
- Niittykumpu (Ängskulla)
- Matinkylä (Mattby)

== Construction ==
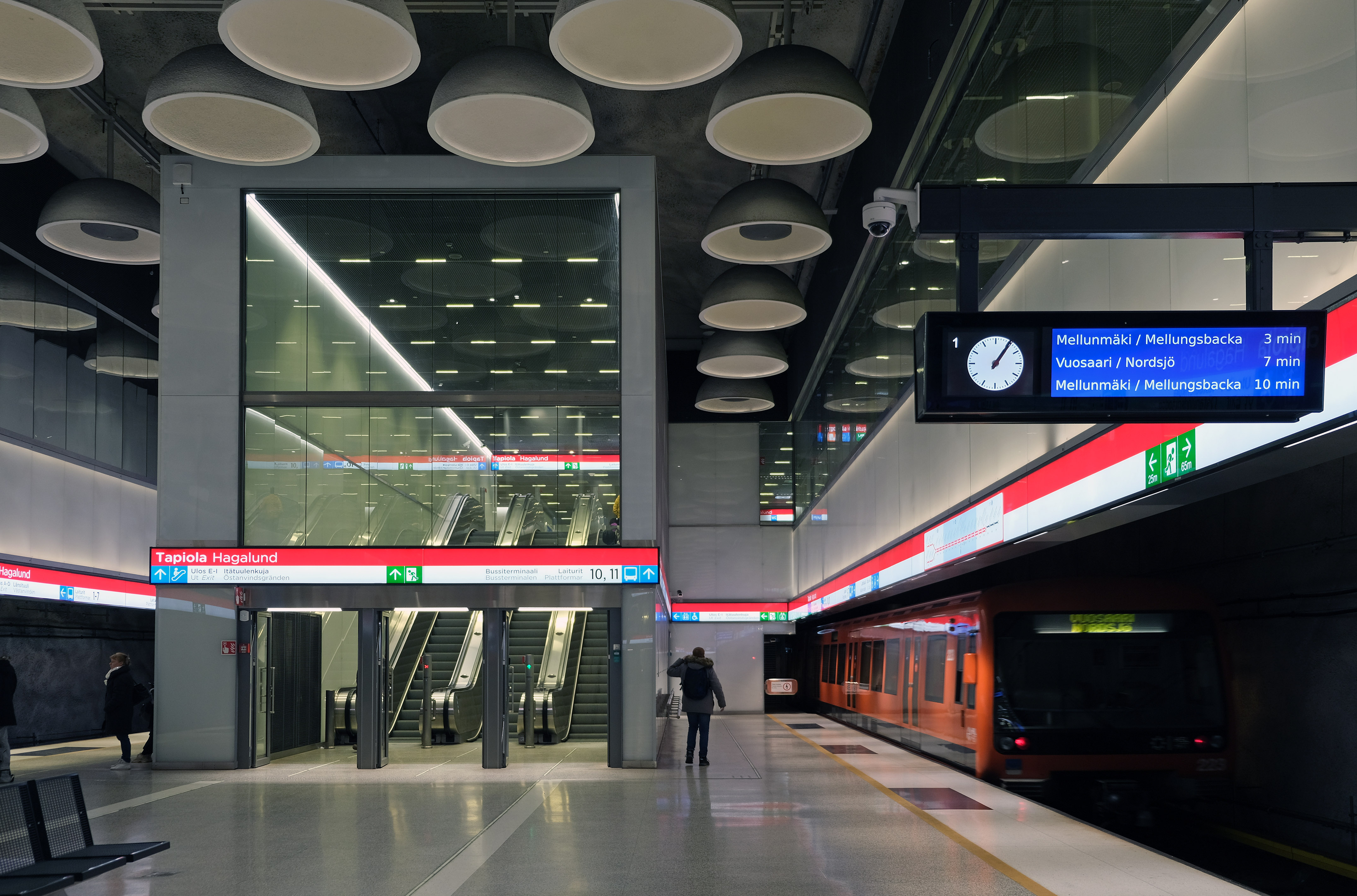
Tapiola metro station

The work started in January 2010 with the extension of the tunnels at the Ruoholahti metro station, and rock blasting in Espoo commenced in August 2010. All contracts for tunneling and station building were signed in December 2011, and rock blasting reached 50% completion in July 2012. The excavation of the first stations began in 2012.

The excavation work on the tunnels was completed on 27 February 2014, while the fitting out of the tunnels and construction of the stations was ongoing. The last of the tracks were laid in Matinkylä in December 2015.

In January 2014, the estimated date of opening for service was pushed back to autumn 2016 at the earliest. While physical construction was completed on schedule, there were numerous other problems with automatization, project schedules, project leadership and safety systems. Not enough time was scheduled for safety system integration tests, which then failed, causing delays. There was poor workmanship with track installation. Rock dust was left behind from blasting and was not cleaned. Doors were substandard. There was poor communication from the cities via Länsimetro and the main contractor Sweco to the building contractors. The general manager of the project was fired. A report detailing the reasons for the failures was written, but was not released due to "advice from lawyers".

== The second phase ==
On 3 February 2014, the city board of Espoo proposed to the city council an extension of the new line to Kivenlahti, on the condition that the Finnish state would commit to paying 30% of the construction costs. This extension would run entirely within Espoo, and would serve five new stations. On 24 February 2014, Espoo city council approved the proposal by a vote of 65 to 10.

It was estimated that starting the construction of the second phase immediately after the conclusion of the first phase would save about 130 million euros, compared to a five-year delay between the construction of the two phases. The estimated cost of the second phase was €801 million in 2013.

According to HSL, when the extension to Kivenlahti opened, lines M1 and M2 would reach Kivenlahti (Kivenlahti-Vuosaari/Mellunmäki) and line M2 would run to Matinkylä (Matinkylä-Mellunmäki).

The stations of the new extension include (Swedish station names in parentheses):

- Finnoo (Finno)
- Kaitaa (Kaitans)
- Soukka (Sökö)
- Espoonlahti (Esboviken)
- Kivenlahti (Stensvik)

== See also ==
- Helsinki Metro
- Public transport in Helsinki
- Public transport in Finland
- Kehärata
