= Matinkylä metro station =

Helsinki Metro station

Matinkylä Mattby
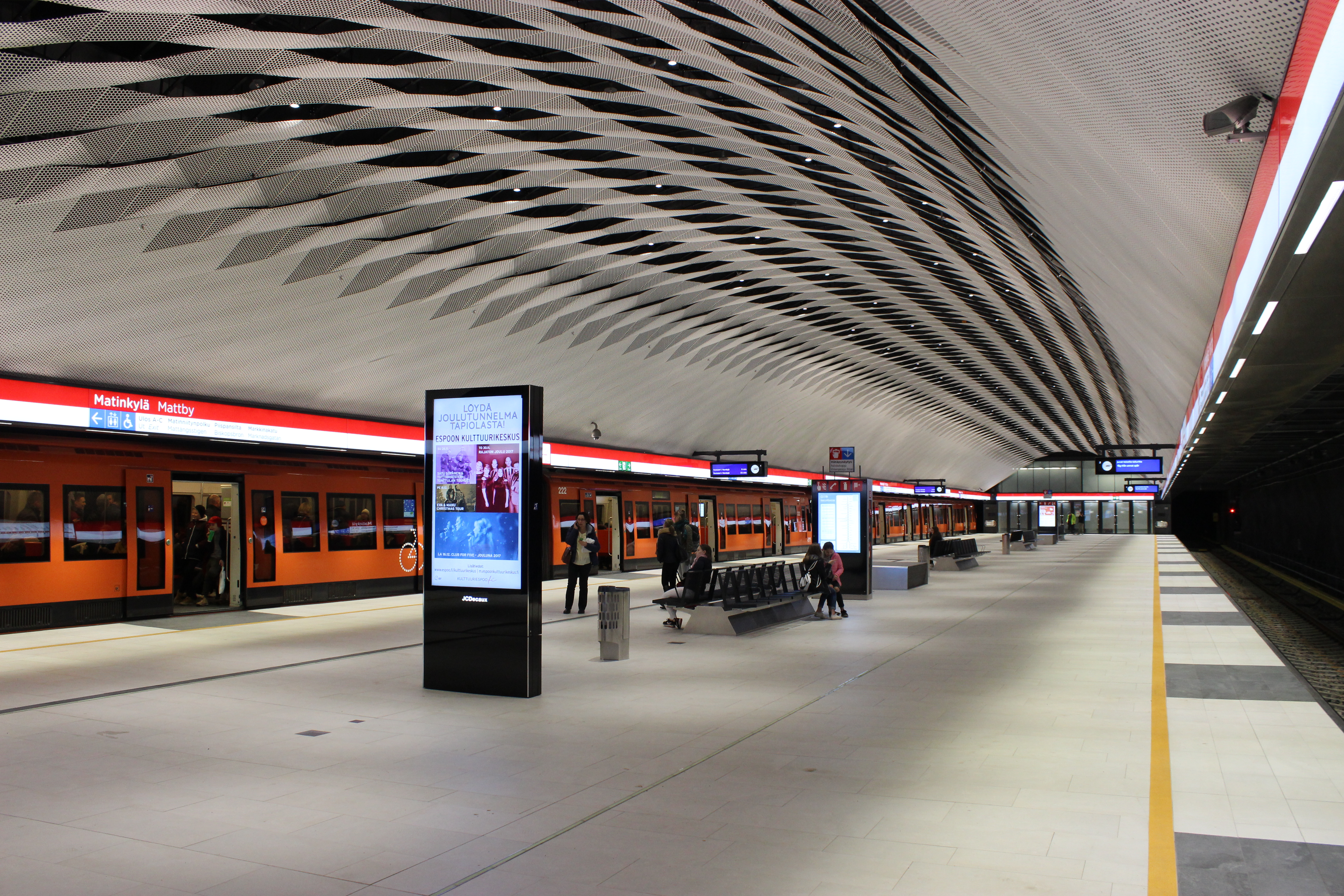
- Matinkylä metro station in November 2017.

General information
- Location: Suomenlahdentie 1 Matinkylä, Espoo
- Coordinates: 60°09′34″N 24°44′18″E
- System: Helsinki Metro station
- Platforms: Island platform
- Tracks: 2
- Connections: HSL buses 111, 112/N, 133, 134, 136, 137, 138, 143/A, 145, 146/A/N, 147/A/N, 157, 158, 159, 164A/VA, 165/N, 171, 172/V, 173/K/N/Z, 174Z, 520, 531/B, 532, 533

Construction
- Structure type: Deep single-vault
- Depth: 25 metres (82 ft)
- Accessible: Yes

Other information
- Fare zone: B

History
- Opened: 18 November 2017

Passengers
- 30,500 daily

Services
Preceding station	Helsinki Metro	Following station
Finnoo towards Kivenlahti	M1	Niittykumpu towards Vuosaari
Location

Matinkylä (Finnish) or Mattby (Swedish) is an underground station of the western metro extension (Länsimetro) of the Helsinki Metro. It is located at the southern end of Iso Omena shopping centre. 3 December 2022, the extension from Matinkylä to Kivenlahti opened as part of the second phase of the Länsimetro. The station serves up to 30,000 people on weekdays. It is located 1,6 kilometres east from Finnoo metro station and 1,9 kilometres west from Niittykumpu metro station.

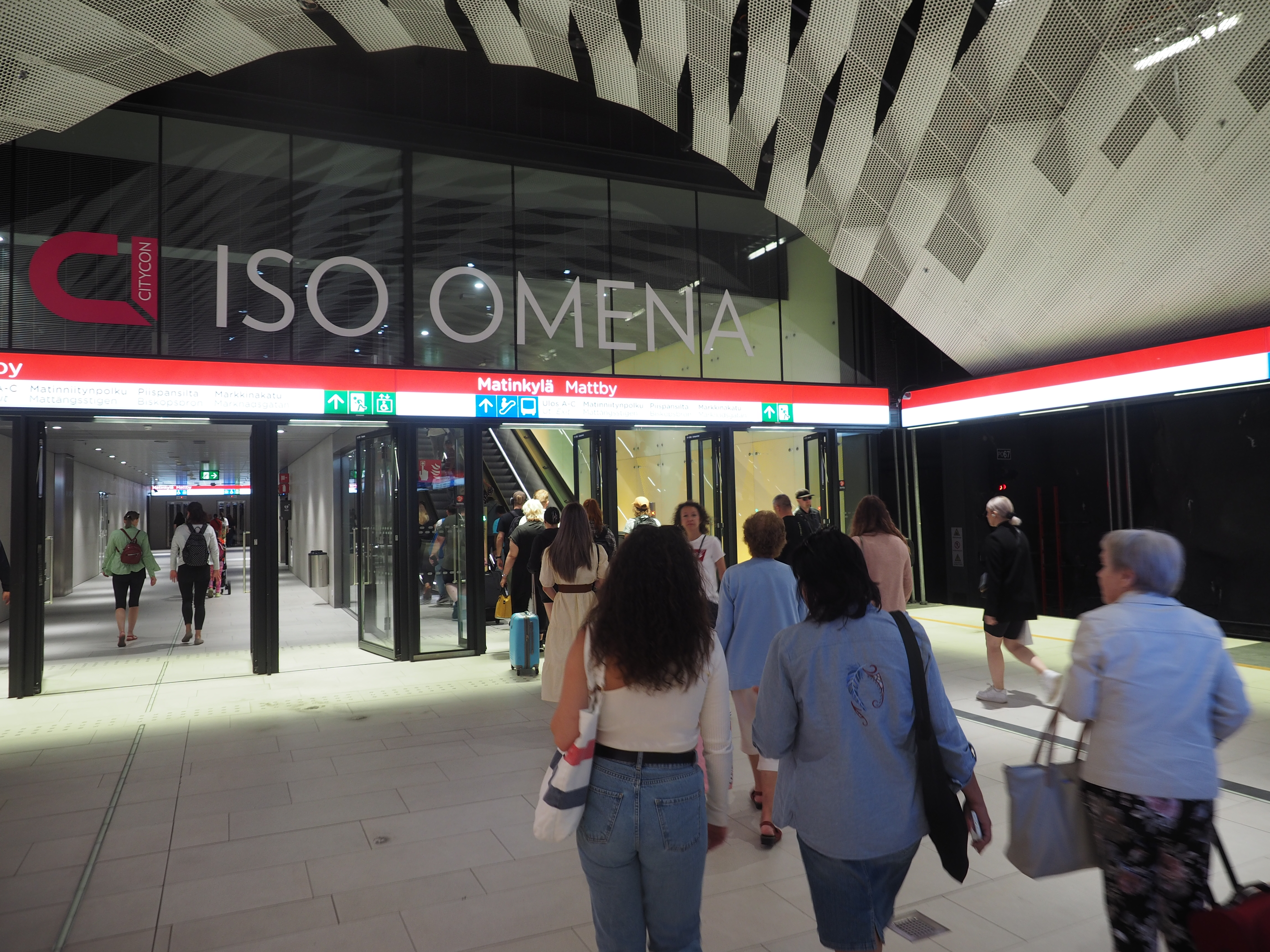
Exit to the Iso Omena shopping centre from the platform area at the metro station
