= Matinkylä =

Matinkylä Mattby
- District of Espoo
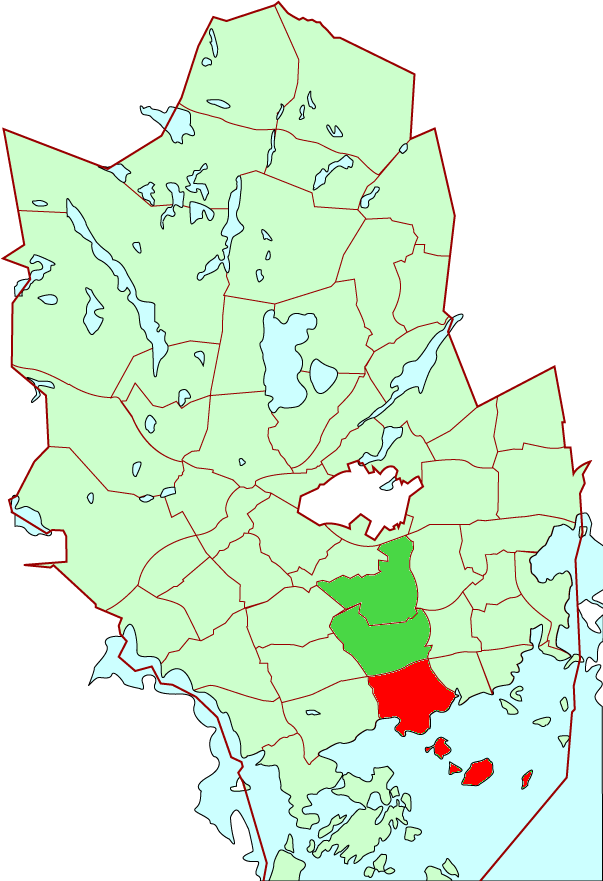
- Location of Matinkylä within Espoo
- Coordinates: 60°10′N 24°45′E
- Country: Finland
- Municipality: Espoo
- Region: Uusimaa
- Sub-region: Greater Helsinki
- Main District: Suur-Matinkylä
- Inner District(s): Matinkylän keskus, Tiistilä, Matinlahti, Matinmetsä

Population (2006)
  - Total: 18,143

Languages
  - Finnish: 79.9 %
  - Swedish: 11.3 %
  - Other: 8.9 %
- Jobs: 3,419

Matinkylä (Finnish: [ˈmat̪inˌkylæ]; Swedish: Mattby, Finland Swedish: [ˈmatˌby]; both literally translated the "village of Matt/Matti") is one of the major districts of Espoo, a city on the southern coast of Finland. Matinkylä sits between the Länsiväylä highway and the coast of the Gulf of Finland, between the areas of Haukilahti and Iivisniemi.

The middle part of Matinkylä consists of high apartment buildings, whereas the southern part consists of terraced houses and shorter apartment buildings. There are also some detached houses and paired houses in the area. Iirislahti in eastern Matinkylä, as well as Nuottalahti, Nuottaniemi and Koukkuniemi in southern Matinkylä consist of smaller houses. Matinkylä also has a marine area with many islands, such as Iso Vasikkasaari and Miessaari.

About 30,000 people live in the Greater Matinkylä area, consisting of Matinkylä itself and the neighbouring areas of Olari and Henttaa. Iso Omena, one of Finland's biggest shopping malls, is situated in Matinkylä.

Matinkylä was the final stop of the Länsimetro, until the extension to Kivenlahti was finished in December 2022.

== History ==
The roots of Matinkylä date back to the medieval village of Mattby, which was located to the north of the main building of the current Matinkylä manor. At the time, the areas were located immediately next to the shore of the Gulf of Finland, tectonic uplift has since slowly shifted the shoreline to the south. The 1540 land record mentions Mattby having four main houses. The fifth house in the village, Biskopsby, disappeared already in the 16th century; its location remains a mystery. The main farms lost their independent status in the 17th century, and their names have been forgotten.

As well as the Matinkylä manor, the site of the Frisans manor is located in Matinkylä.

== Services ==
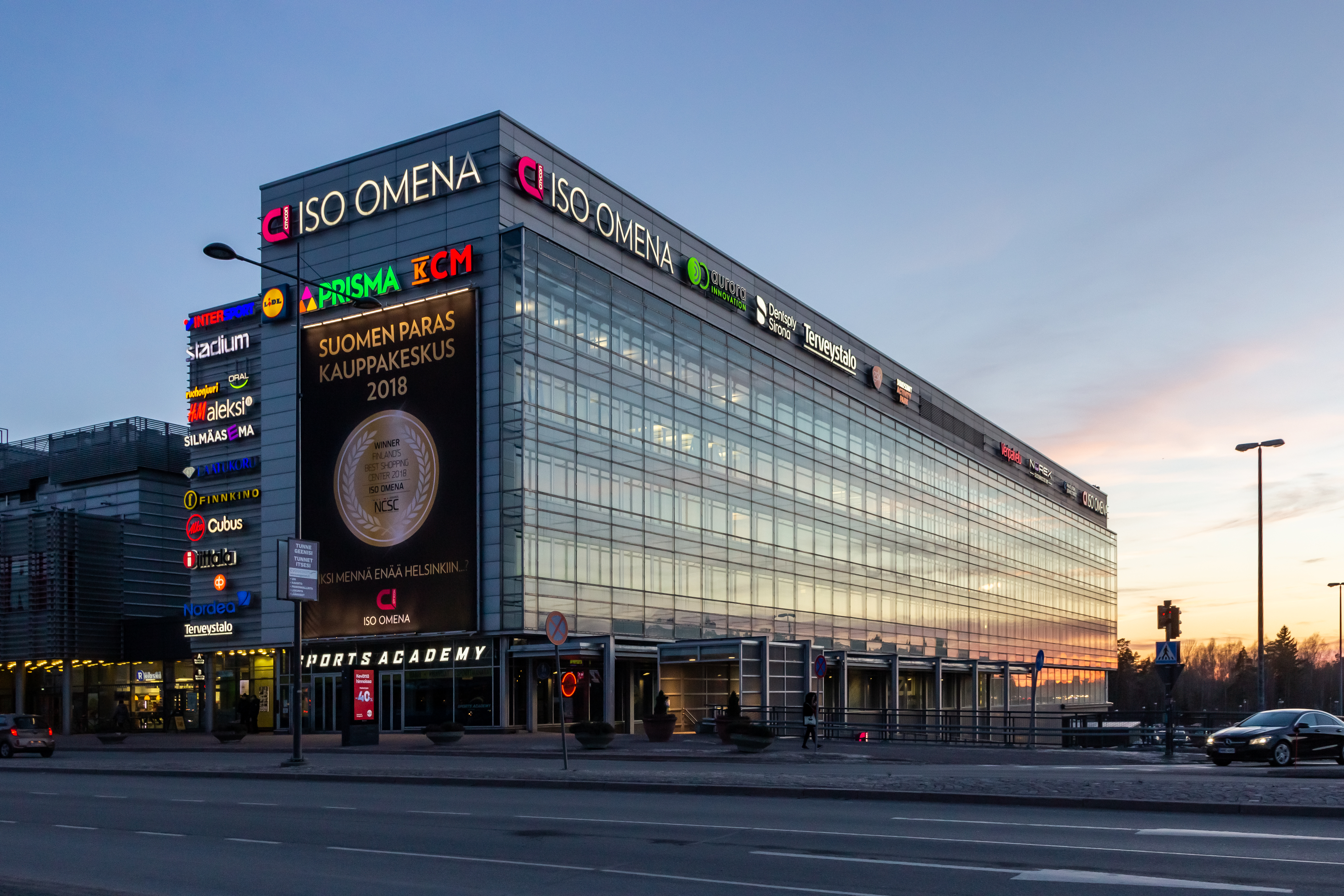
Iso Omena is one of the largest shopping centers in Finland.

The shopping centre Iso Omena is located on the northern side of Matinkylä. The shopping centre includes over 100 businesses as well as numerous municipal services of Espoo, such as a library and a health care station.

The area of Nokkala contains a beach and a boat harbour, connected to the restaurant Nokkalan Majakka. The archipelago ships stop at the Nokkala harbour in summer time.

There are three primary schools in Matinkylä: the Matinlahti school (classes 1 to 6), the Tiistilä school (classes 1 to 10) and the Swedish-speaking Mattlidens skola (classes 1 to 9). The Swedish-speaking Mattlidens Gymnasium is connected to Mattlidens skola.

== Transport ==
The Matinkylä metro station, the terminus of the first stage of Länsimetro, was taken into use on 18 November 2017. The station is connected to a bus terminal. The metro station and the bus terminal are located in the Iso Omena shopping centre.

== Future ==
There are plans to build Finland's largest gymnasium Meri-Matti in Matinkylä. The projected cost of the school, intended for about 1350 students, is 40 to 45 million euro. The Olari gymnasium will move to Meri-Matti once it is completed. The Meri-Matti gymnasium will be built in Tynnyripuisto from 2019 to 2022.

== Gallery ==
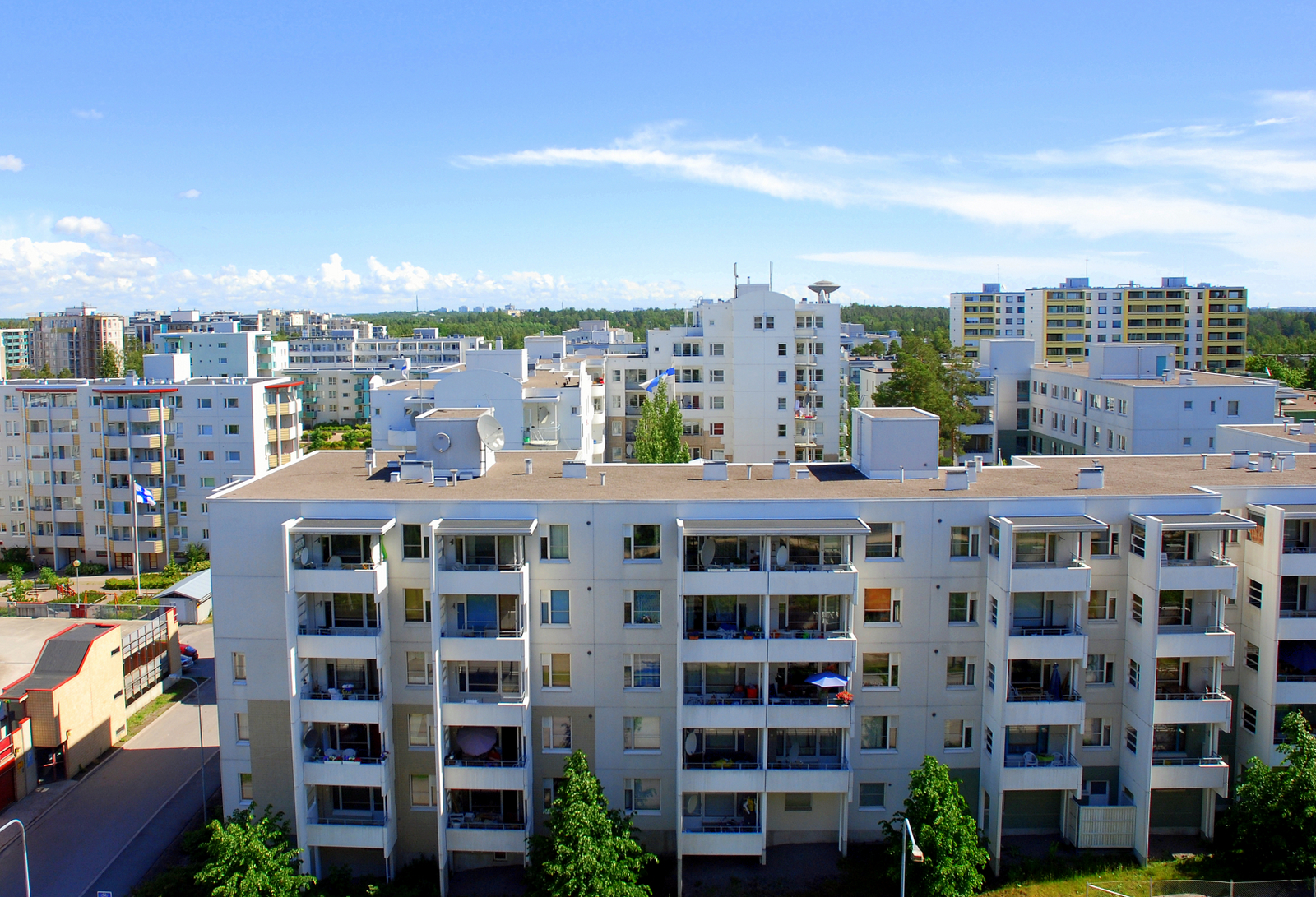
Apartment buildings in Matinkylä.

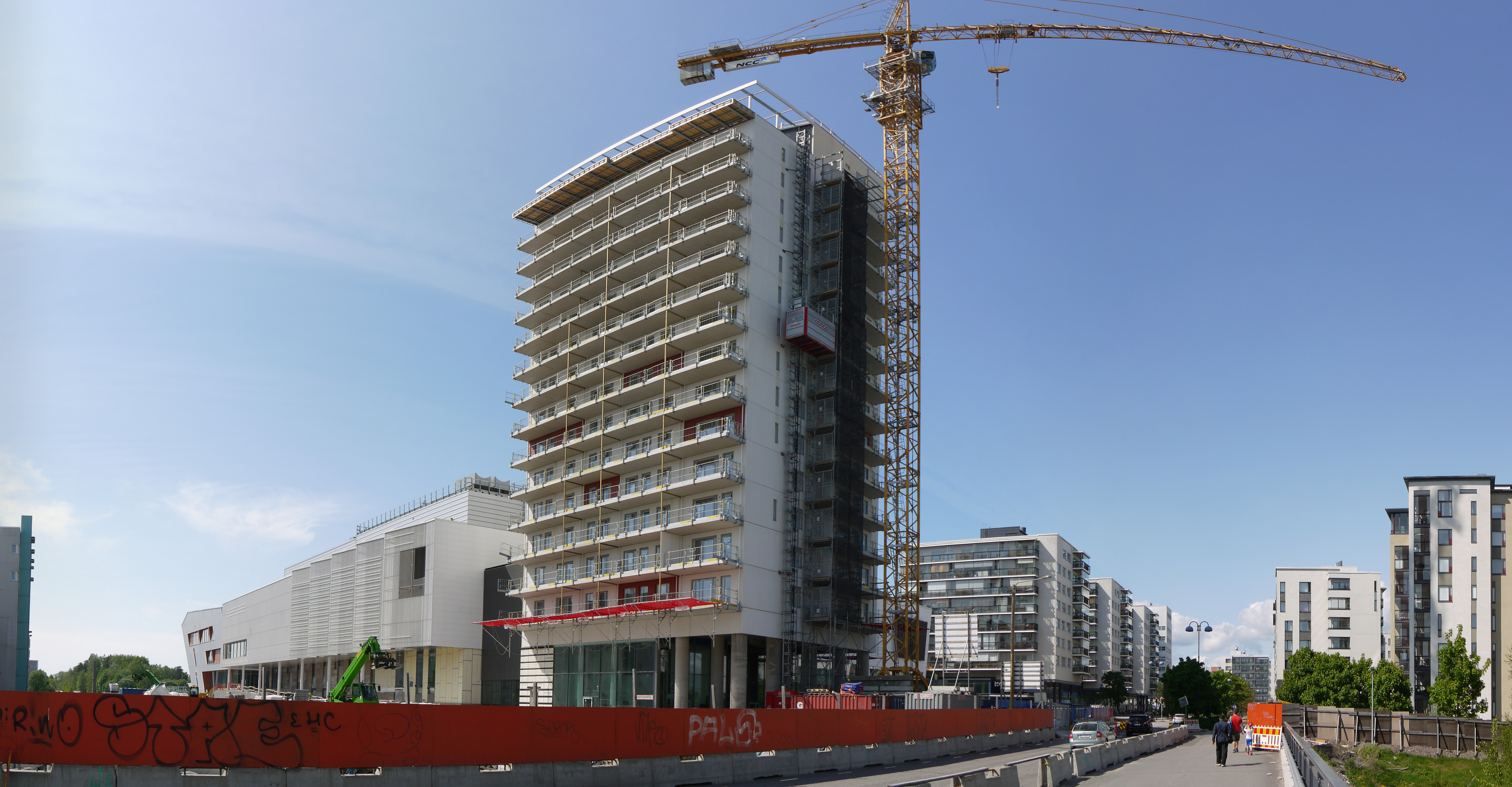
The extension of Iso Omena under construction in spring 2015.

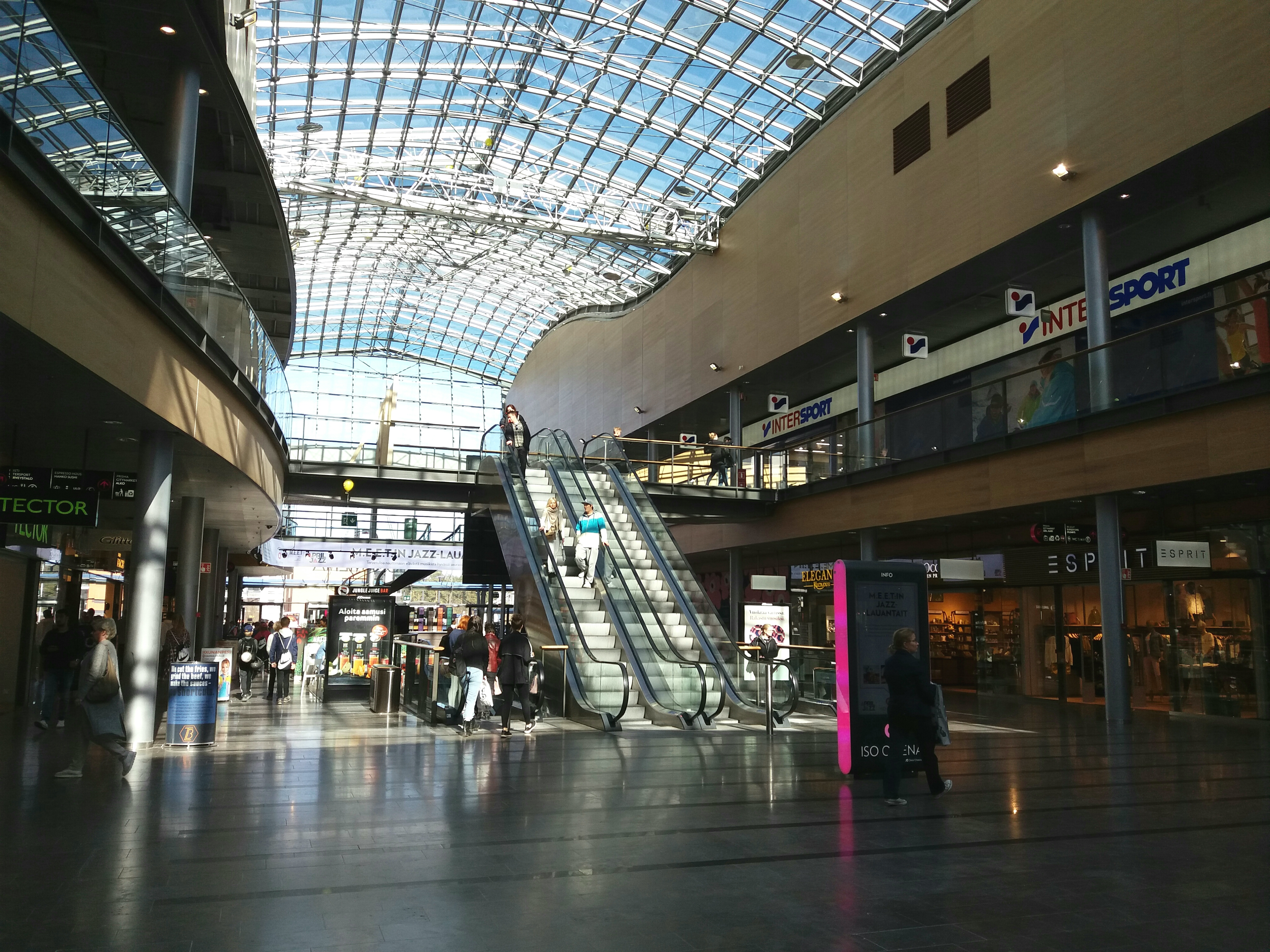
Interior of Iso Omena.

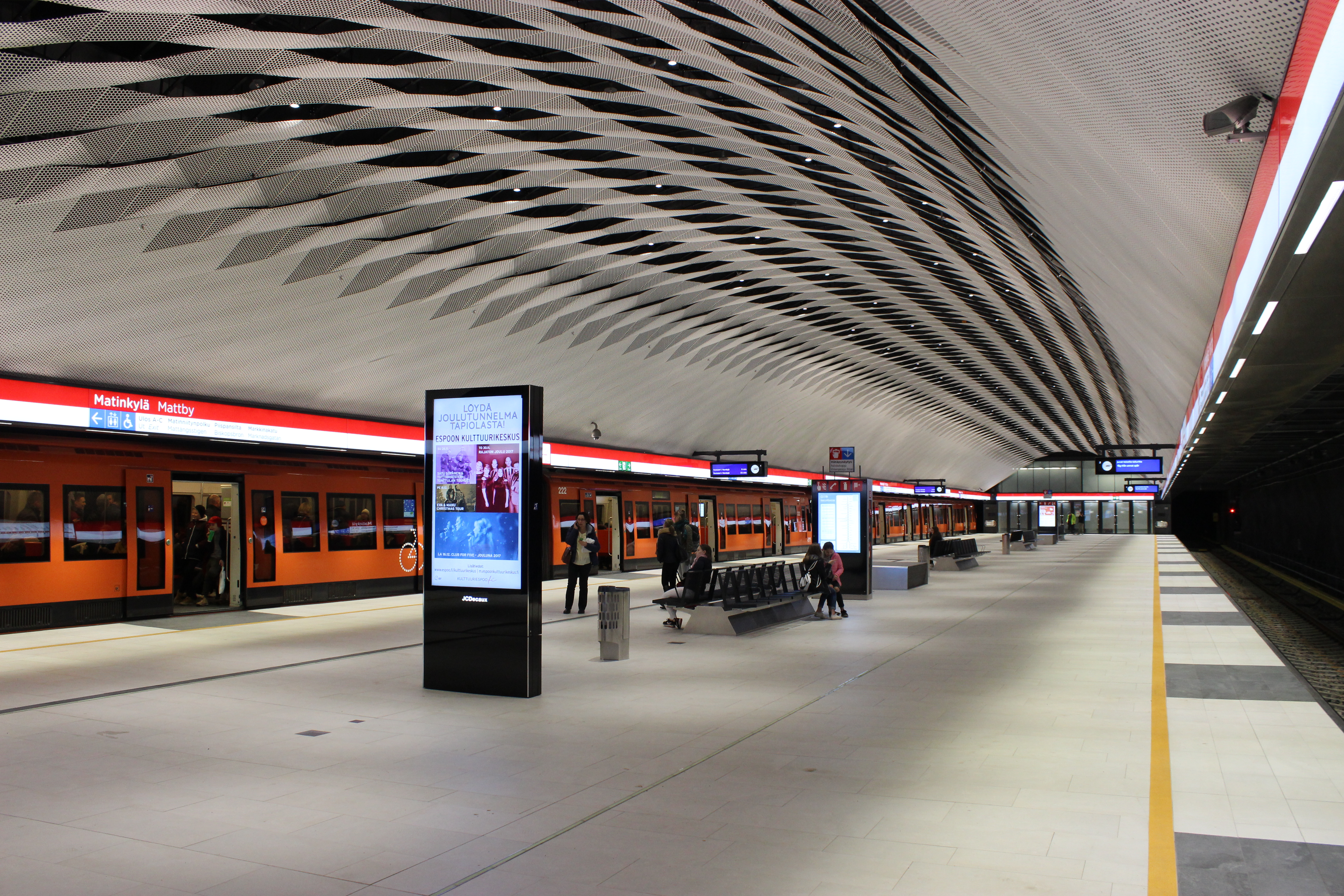
The Matinkylä metro station.

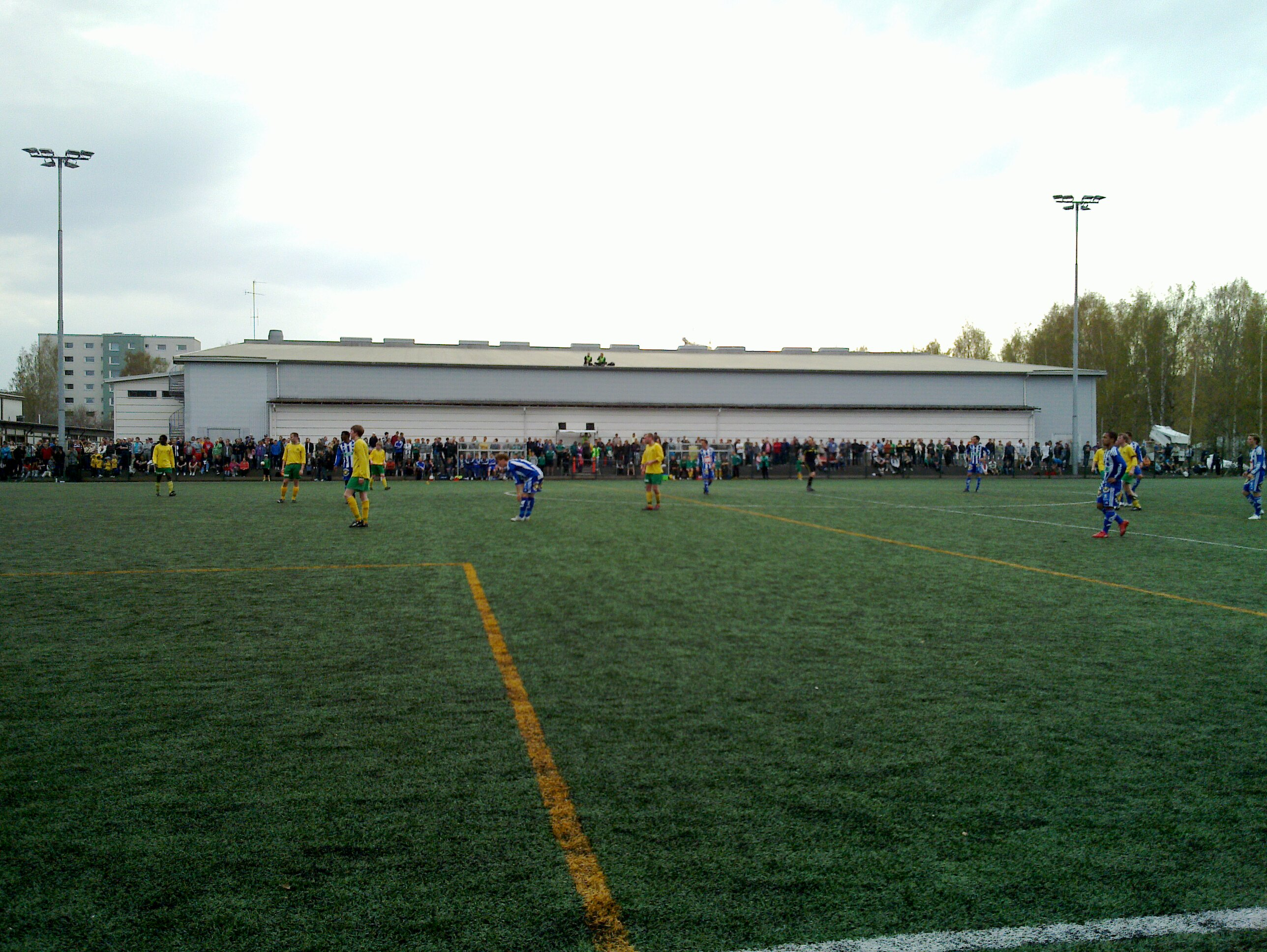
The Matinkylä sports park.

== See also ==
- Matinkylä metro station
- Ring II
- Districts of Espoo
