= Aalto University metro station =

Helsinki Metro station

Coordinates: 60.184700°N 24.825055°E

Aalto University Aalto-yliopisto Aalto-universitetet
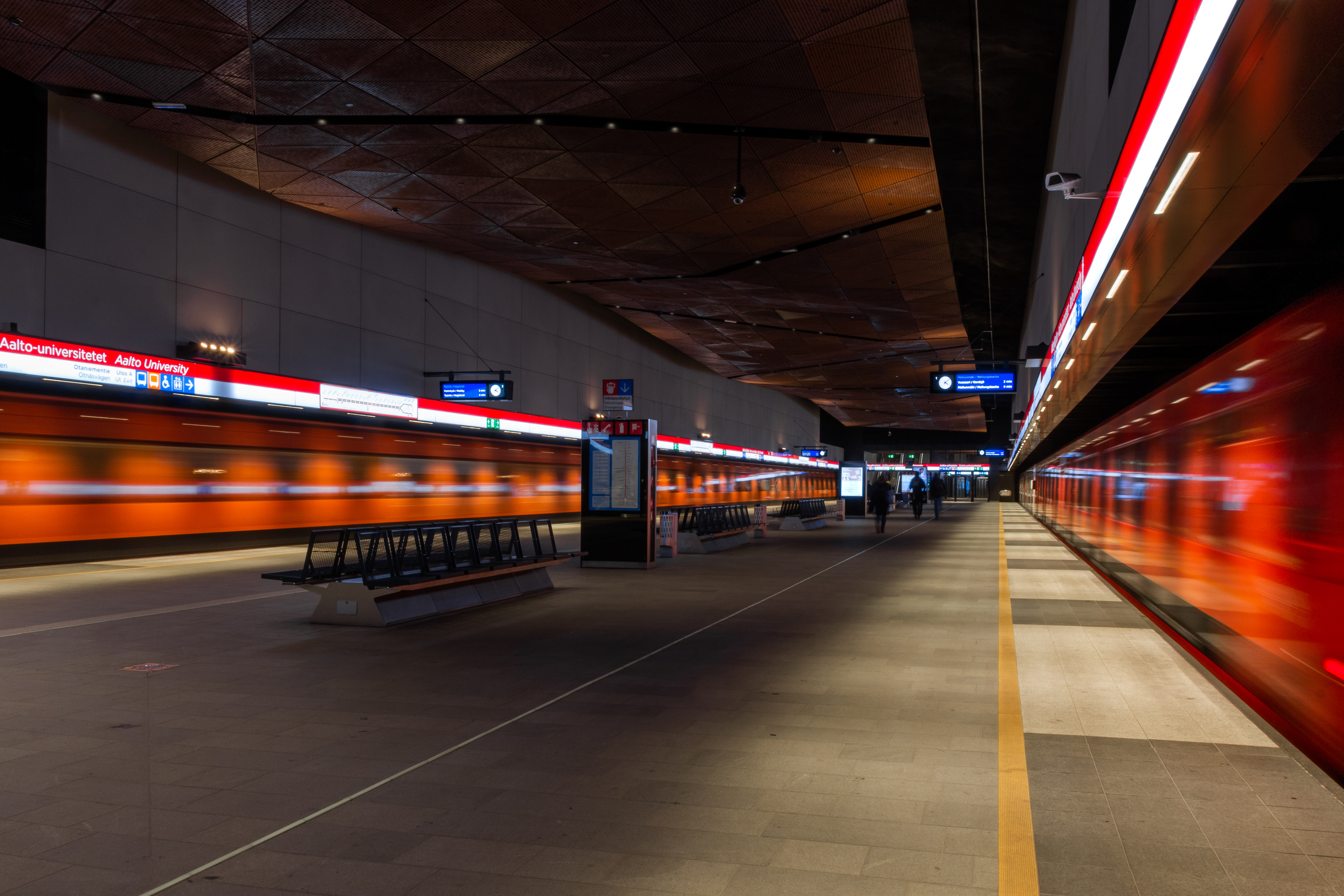
- Aalto University metro station in January 2019.

General information
- Location: Aalto UniversityOtaniemi, Espoo
- System: Helsinki Metro station
- Platforms: Island platform
- Tracks: 2
- Connections: Light rail: 15; HSL buses 111, 550 510 , 552, 555

Construction
- Structure type: Deep single-vault
- Depth: 20 metres (66 ft)
- Accessible: Yes

Other information
- Fare zone: B

History
- Opened: 18 November 2017

Passengers
- 19,200 daily

Services
Preceding station	Helsinki Metro	Following station
Tapiola towards Kivenlahti	M1	Keilaniemi towards Vuosaari
Tapiola Terminus	M2	Keilaniemi towards Mellunmäki
Location

Aalto University (Finnish: Aalto-yliopisto, Swedish: Aalto-universitetet) is an underground station on the western metro extension (Länsimetro) of the Helsinki Metro, in the Otaniemi district of Espoo, Finland. It is located inside the Otaniemi campus of Aalto University. The station is located 1.7 kilometres northeast from Tapiola metro station and 1.4 kilometres northwest from Keilaniemi metro station.
