= Soukka metro station =

Station on the Länsimetro extension of the Helsinki Metro

Coordinates: 60.142173°N 24.669361°E

Soukka Sökö
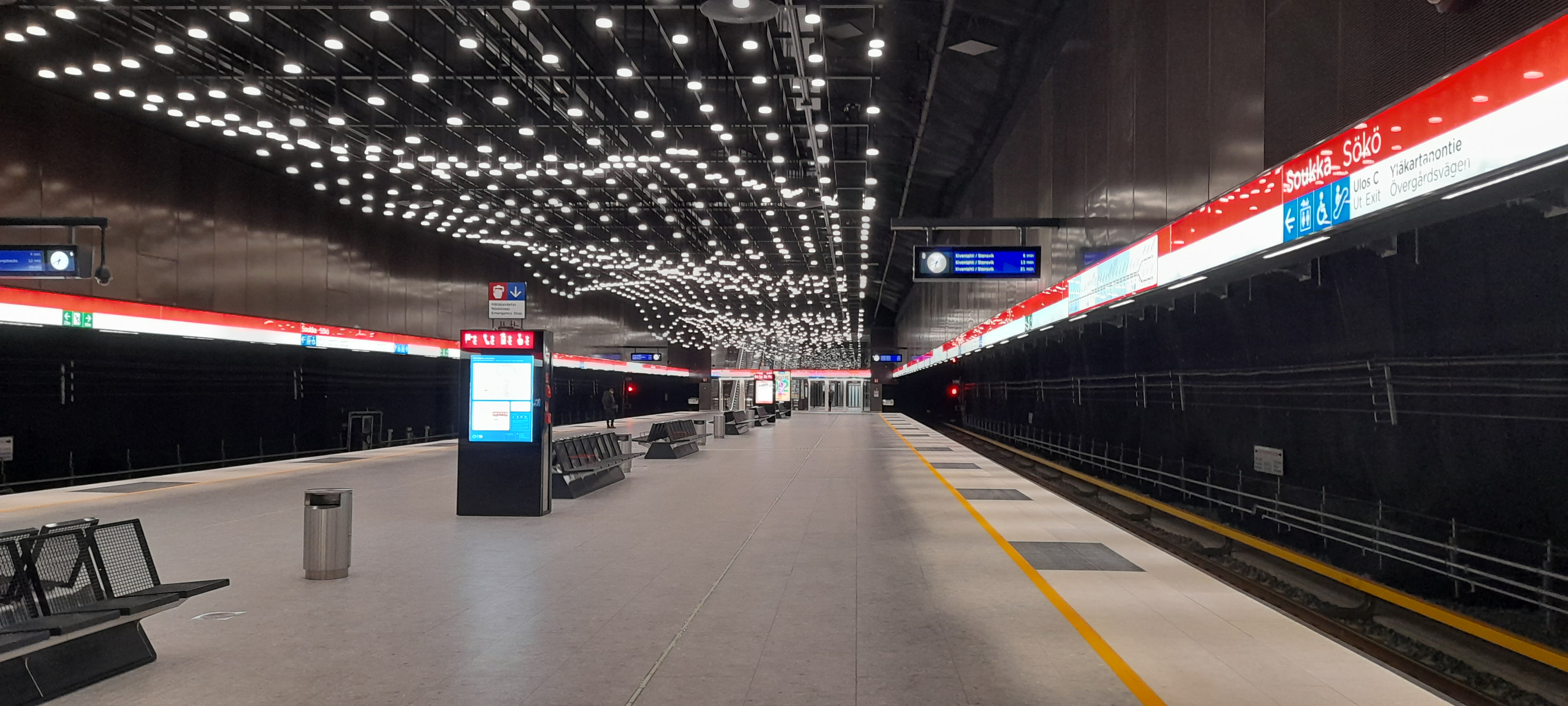
- Soukka metro station after opening in 2022

General information
- Location: Soukka, Espoo
- System: Helsinki Metro station
- Platforms: Island platform
- Tracks: 2
- Connections: HSL buses 147, 147N, 148, 163, 542, 544

Construction
- Structure type: Underground
- Depth: 13.7 metres (45 ft)
- Accessible: Yes

Other information
- Fare zone: С

History
- Opened: 3 December 2022

Services
Preceding station	Helsinki Metro	Following station
Espoonlahti towards Kivenlahti	M1	Kaitaa towards Vuosaari
Location

Soukka (Finnish) or Sökö (Swedish) is an underground station on the western metro extension (Länsimetro) of the Helsinki Metro in Finland. The station is opened on 3 December 2022, located 1.3 kilometres southeast from Espoonlahti metro station and 1.6 kilometres west from Kaitaa metro station. The station has two exits, one on Soukantori and one on Yläkartanontie. Soukka is the southernmost metro station in Helsinki.
