= Keilaniemi metro station =

Railway station in Espoo, Finland

Coordinates: 60.1758°N 24.8295°E

Keilaniemi Kägeludden
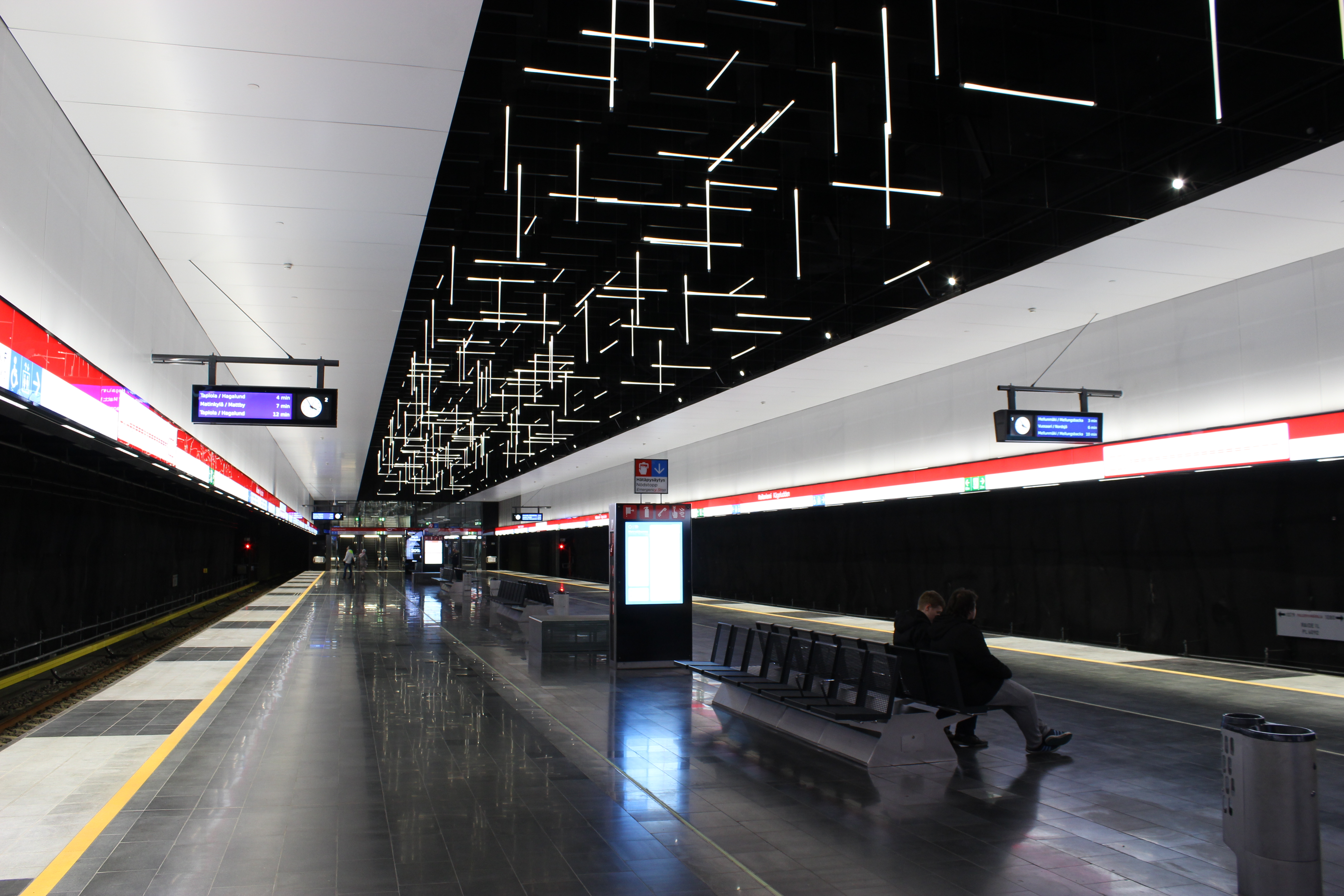
- The Keilaniemi metro station in November 2017.

General information
- Location: Keilaniementie; Keilaniemi, Espoo
- System: Helsinki Metro station
- Platforms: Island platform
- Tracks: 2
- Connections: Light rail: 15; Bus: 555

Construction
- Structure type: Deep single-vault
- Depth: 20 metres (66 ft)
- Accessible: Yes

Other information
- Fare zone: B

History
- Opened: 18 November 2017

Passengers
- 5,800 daily

Services
Preceding station	Helsinki Metro	Following station
Aalto University towards Kivenlahti	M1	Koivusaari towards Vuosaari
Aalto University towards Tapiola	M2	Koivusaari towards Mellunmäki
Location

Keilaniemi (Finnish) or Kägeludden (Swedish) is an underground station on the western metro extension (Länsimetro) of the Helsinki Metro, in the Otaniemi district of Espoo, Finland. The station is located beside the Fortum head office. It is the easternmost metro station in Espoo, going east to Koivusaari metro station crosses the border to Helsinki. The station is located 1.4 kilometres southeast of Aalto University metro station and 2.3 kilometres west of Koivusaari metro station.

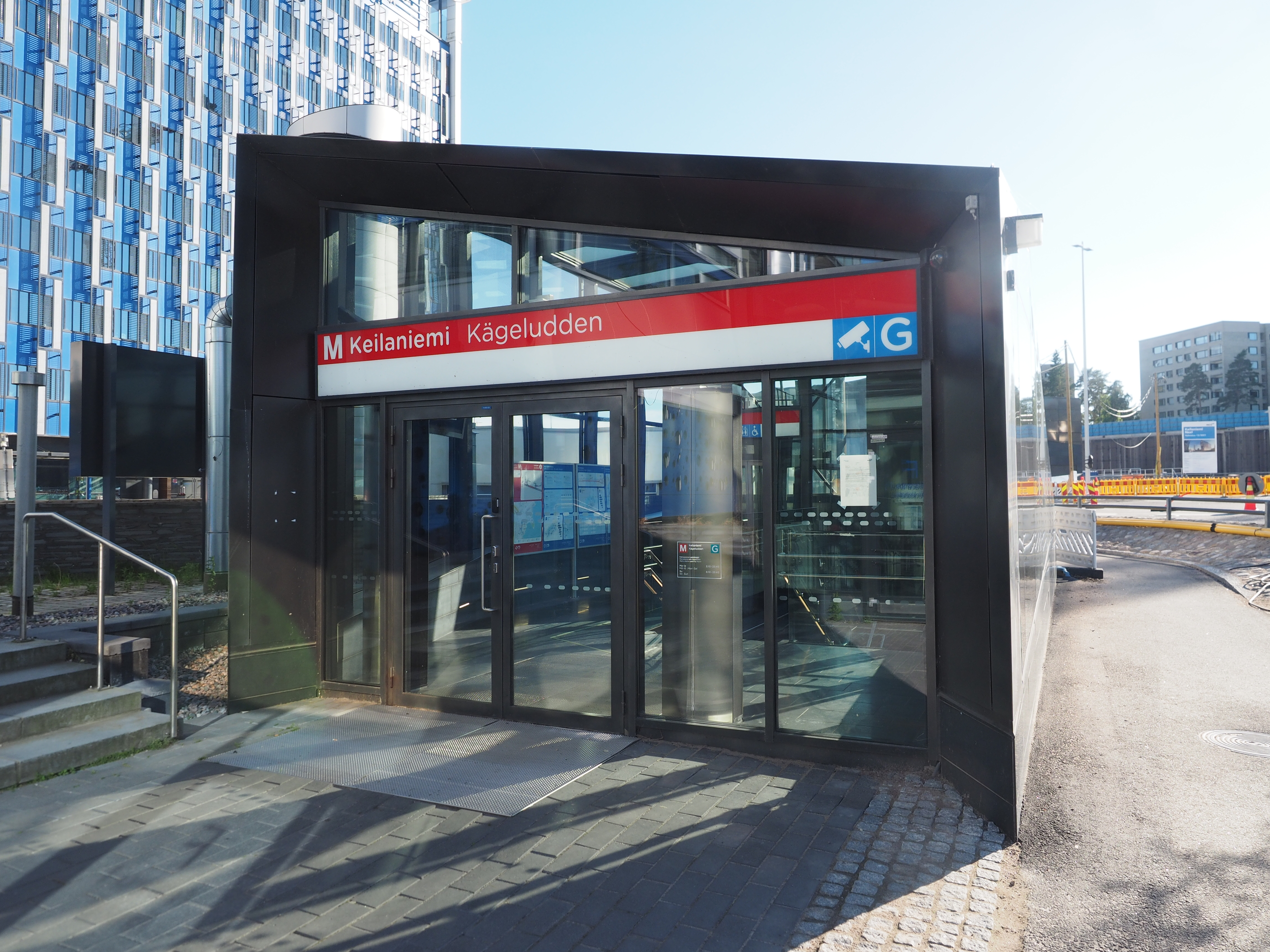
Entrance to the Keilaniemi metro station

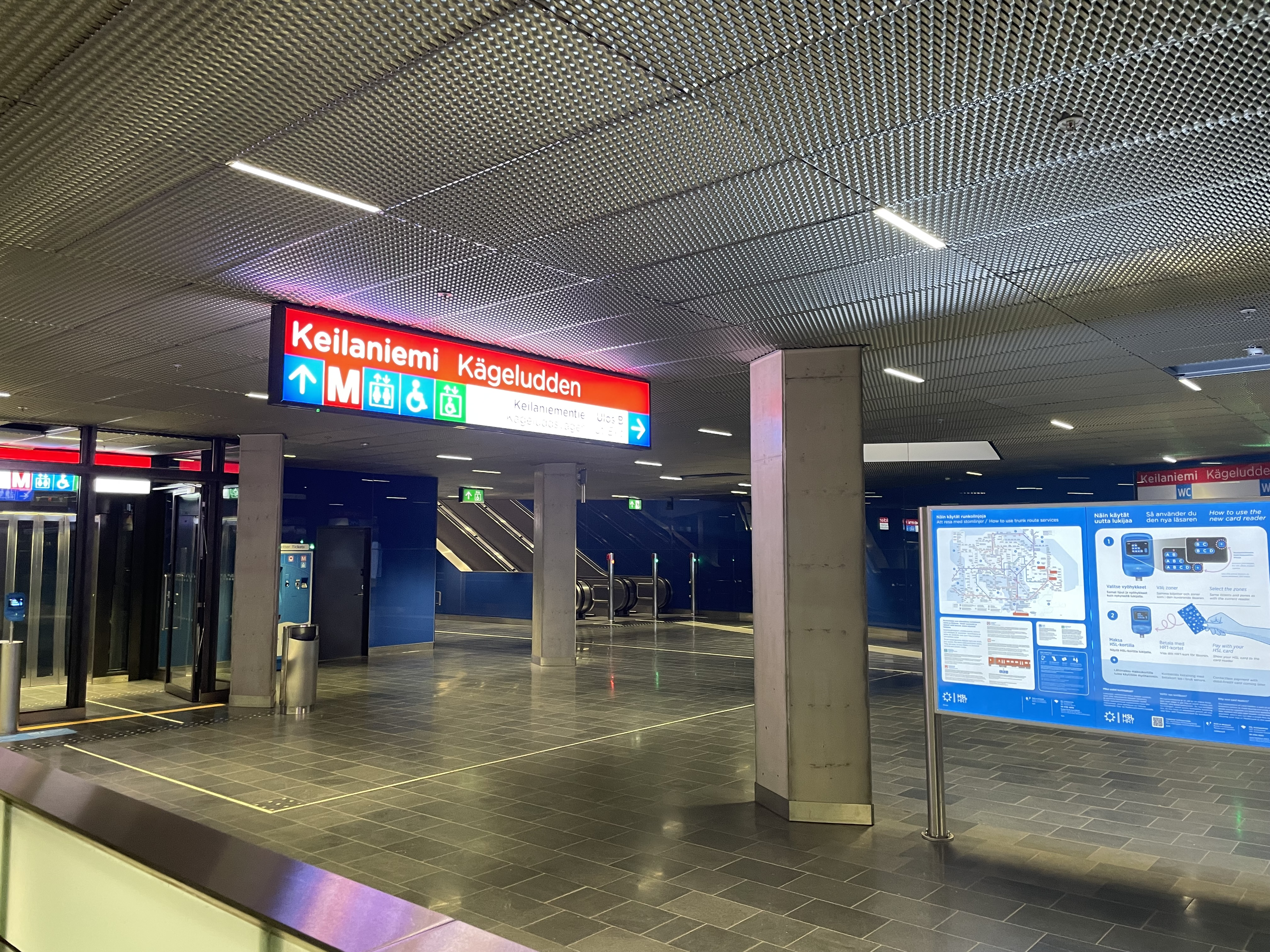
Keilaniemi station hall
