= Espoonlahti metro station =

Station on the Länsimetro extension of the Helsinki Metro

Espoonlahti Esboviken
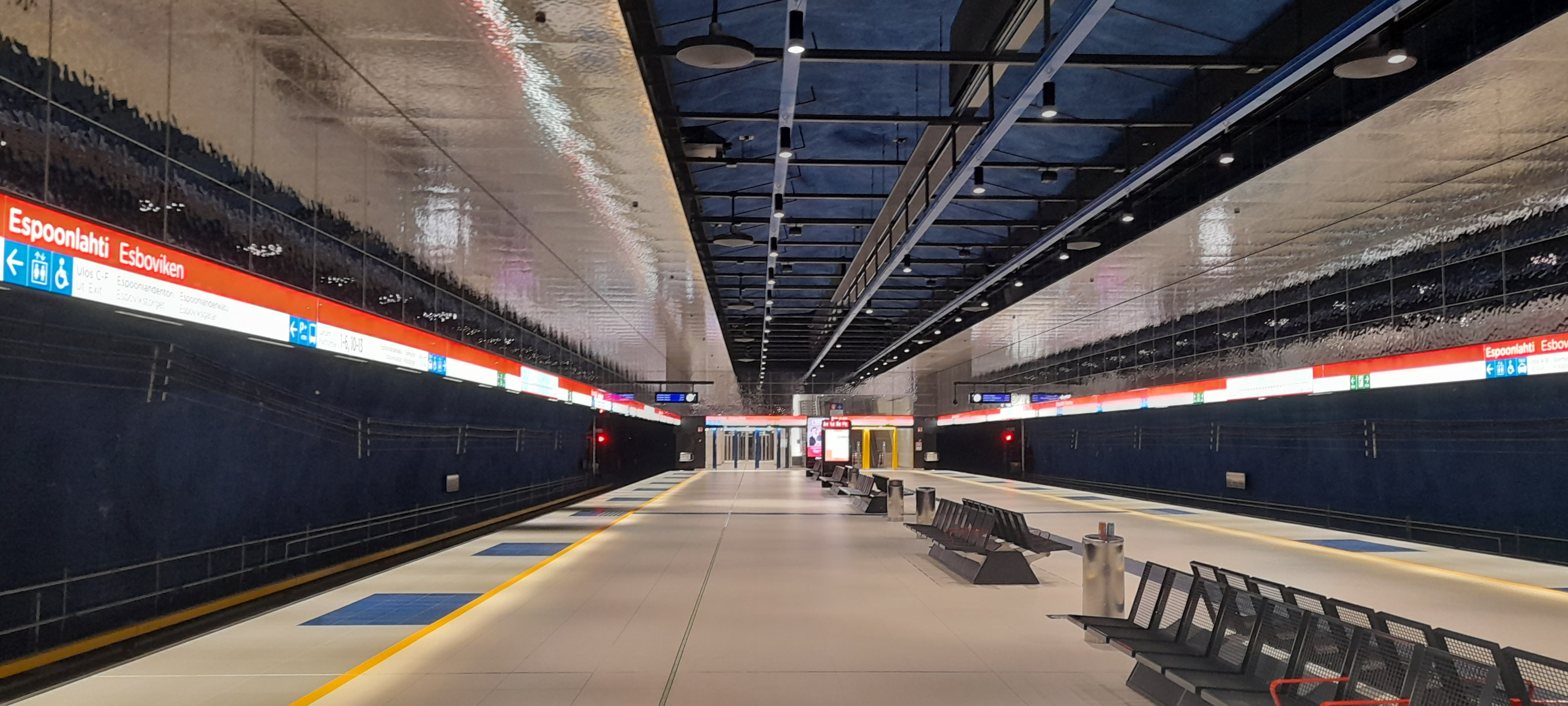
- Espoonlahti metro station after opening in 2022

General information
- Location: Espoonlahti, Espoo
- Coordinates: 60.1494°N 24.6547°E
- System: Helsinki Metro station
- Platforms: Island platform
- Tracks: 2
- Connections: HSL buses 124, 124K, 125, 146, 146A, 146N, 147A, 147N, 148, 149, 542, 543, 544

Construction
- Structure type: Underground
- Depth: 9.75 metres (32.0 ft)
- Accessible: Yes

Other information
- Fare zone: С

History
- Opened: 3 December 2022

Services
Preceding station	Helsinki Metro	Following station
Kivenlahti Terminus	M1	Soukka towards Vuosaari
Location

Espoonlahti (Finnish) or Esboviken (Swedish) is an underground station on the western metro extension (Länsimetro) of the Helsinki Metro in Finland. The station is opened on 3 December 2022, is located on the southwestern side of the shopping center Lippulaiva, near Espoonlahti, between Espoonlahti and Solmutori, 1 kilometer (0.62 mi) east from Kivenlahti metro station and 1.3 kilometers (0.81 mi) northwest from Soukka metro station.
