= Soukka =

Soukka Sökö
- District of Espoo
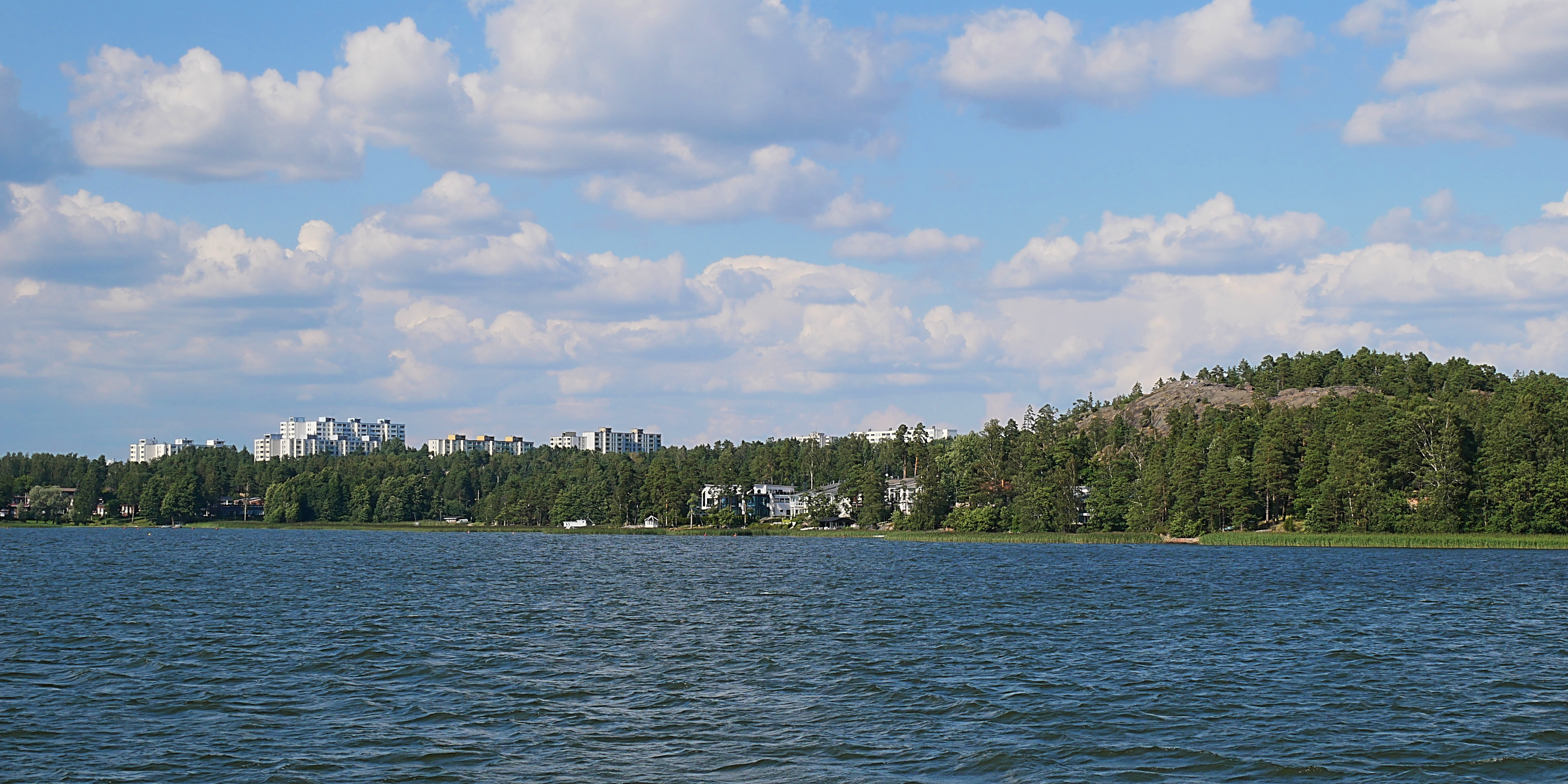
- Soukka from the sea

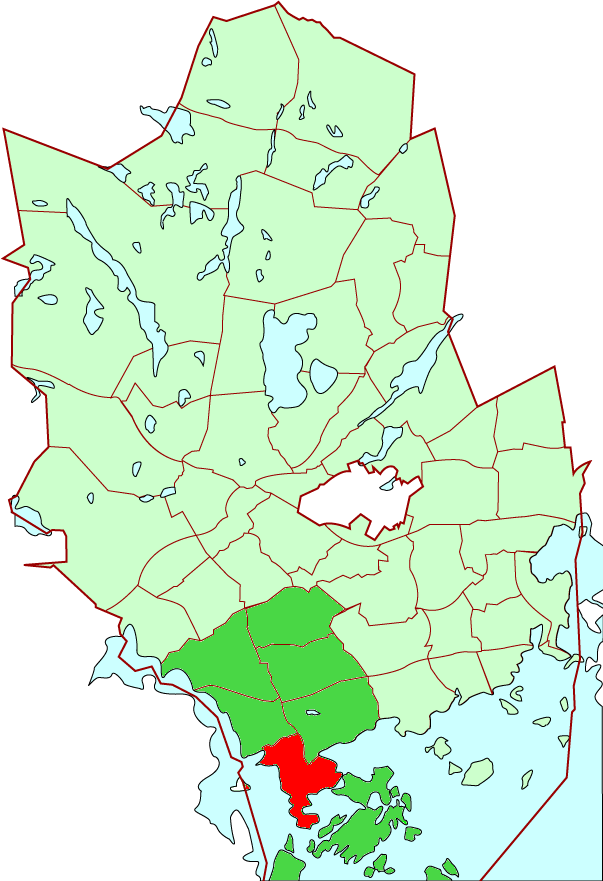
- Location of Soukka within Espoo
- Coordinates: 60°8′26″N 24°40′19″E
- Country: Finland
- Municipality: Espoo
- Region: Uusimaa
- Sub-region: Greater Helsinki
- Main District: Suur-Espoonlahti
- Inner District(s): Ala-Soukka, Hanikka, Kasavuori, Munkkiranta, Soukanniemi, Soukanniitty, Suinonsalmi, Ylä-Soukka

Population (2006)
  - Total: 7,596

Languages
  - Finnish: 79.7 %
  - Swedish: 16.5 %
  - Other: 3.8 %
- Jobs: 729

Soukka (Finnish) or Sökö (Swedish) is district number 33 of Espoo, Finland, located in southwestern Espoo in the main district of Suur-Espoonlahti.

== Early history ==
Soukka is part of the oldest area in Espoo. The oldest discovered signs of habitation in Soukka are from the early metal age. There have been discoveries of Bronze Age cairns in the area of the old Soukka village.

In public documents, Soukka is first mentioned in 1540, written as Soijckoby. The name most likely derives from the Finnish word soukka "narrow" and originally referred to a narrow strait that separated the area from the mainland. As time passed, the name of the village settled on the Swedish name Sökö. The Finnish Bureau of Geography confirmed the Finnish name as Soukka in 1965.

In the 1590s, the village of Soukka consisted of a single independent farm and its subsidiary buildings. The rate of growth was slow and in 1865 there were two independent farms in the village, with a total population according to census of 49. By the late 19th century, the population of Soukka had grown to 103. In the late 18th century, building work had started on the Sveaborg fortress off the coast of Helsinki. The construction of the fortress increased demand for brick and brick construction began also in the lands of Soukka. Industrialisation got off to a real start in the late 19th century, when the first industrial area was founded on the coast of Espoonlahti. Brick factories in nearby villages increased demand for workers.

This, in turn, caused the population of Soukka to increase as part of the workforce arriving in the area settled down in Soukka.

In the 1870s, there emerged a strong community of carpenters in the Soukanniemi area, whose activity lasted until the 1930s. The first of them was Anders Viktor Lindström, the most successful of them was Johan Syrjänen, having bought the southern part of the Staffan island off the coast of Soukanniemi. In wintertime, completed furniture was shipped to Helsinki by sled on the ice, in summertime by steam ship.

== Modern times ==
Soukka is known for its marina, the fountain in the centre of the district and the natural environment of the area. Examples of the latter include the Kasavuori hill on the coast of Espoonlahti, an ancient place of signal fires in the defense of the Finnish coastline. Events in Soukka include an annual Soukka Day, held on the second-to-last weekend of July every year.

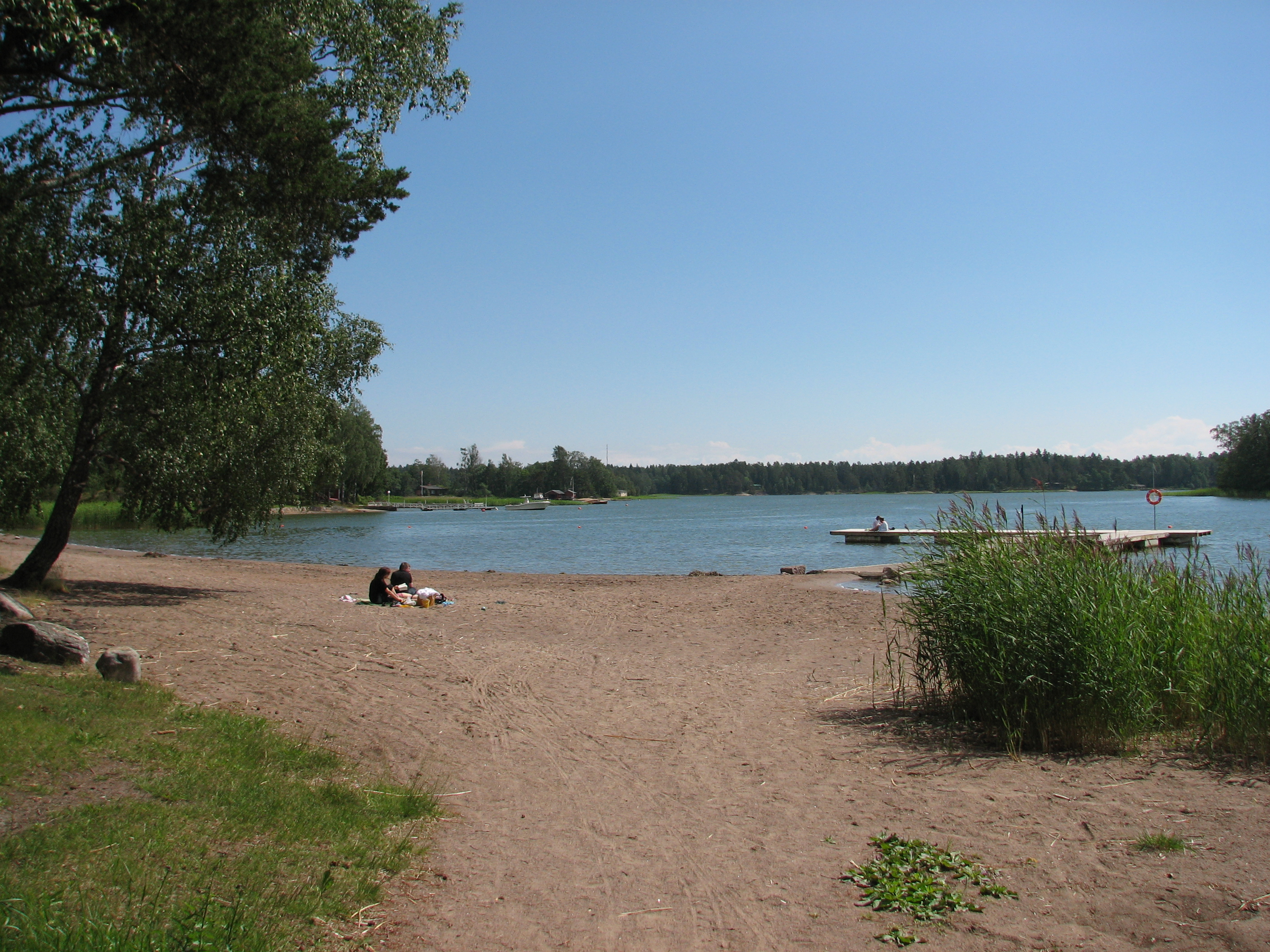
The Suinonniemi beach is located at the southern end of Soukka, very near the Suvisaaristo islands

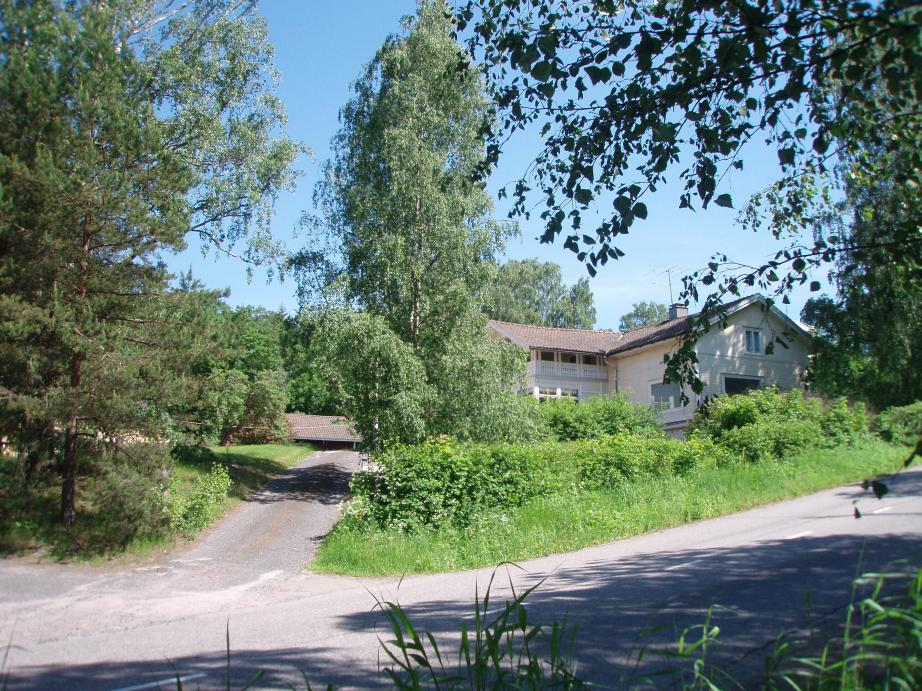
Övergård in Soukka, which has given its name to Yläkartanontie

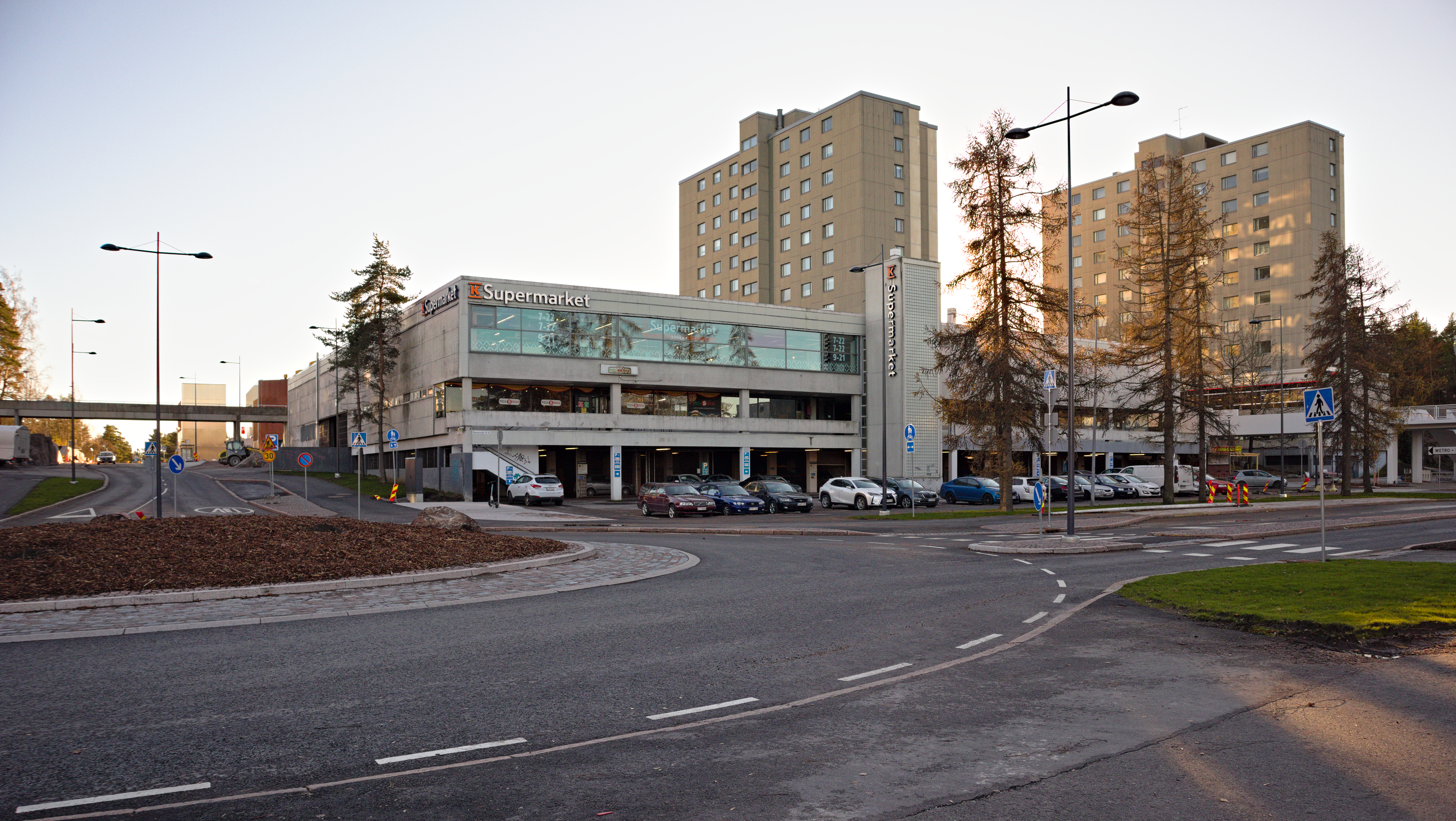
The Soukka shopping centre

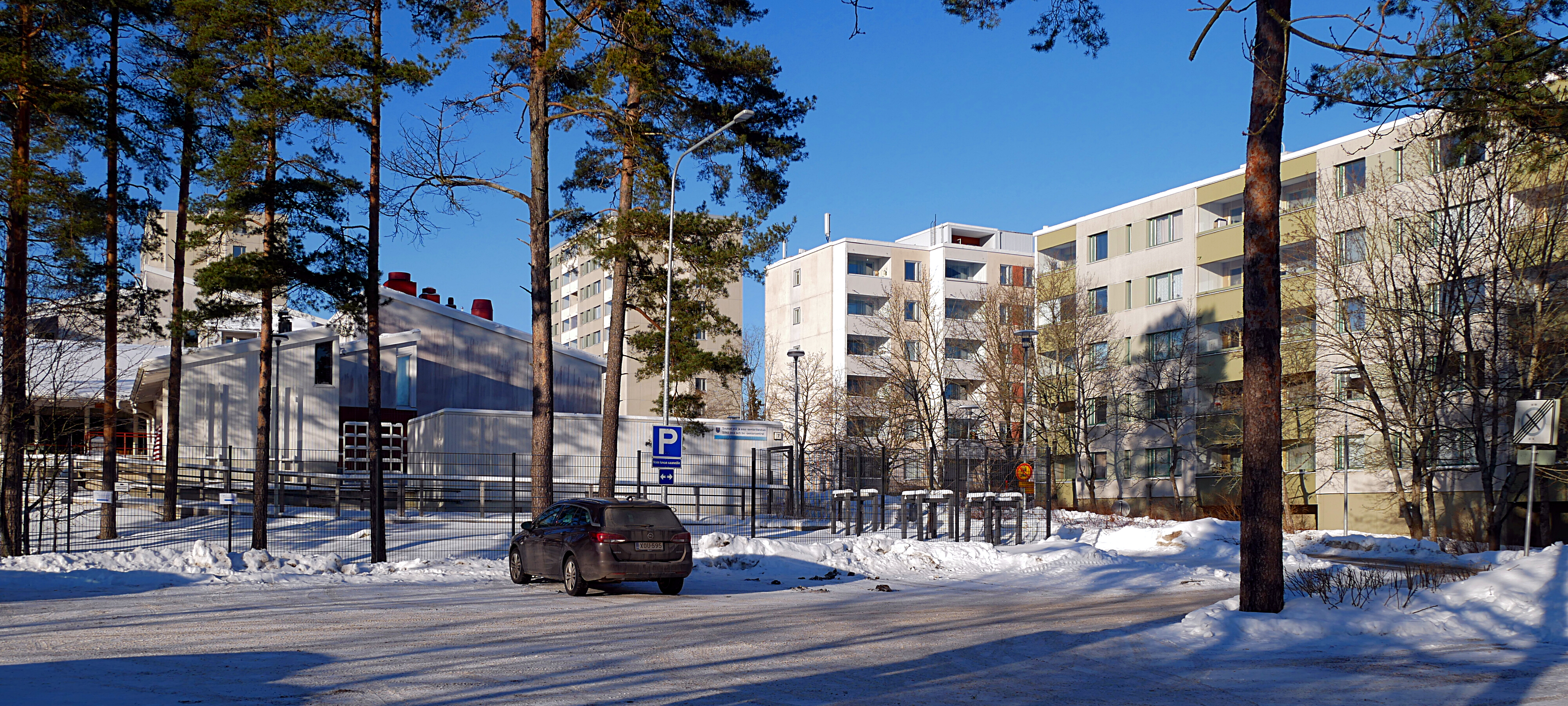
Soukka residential area

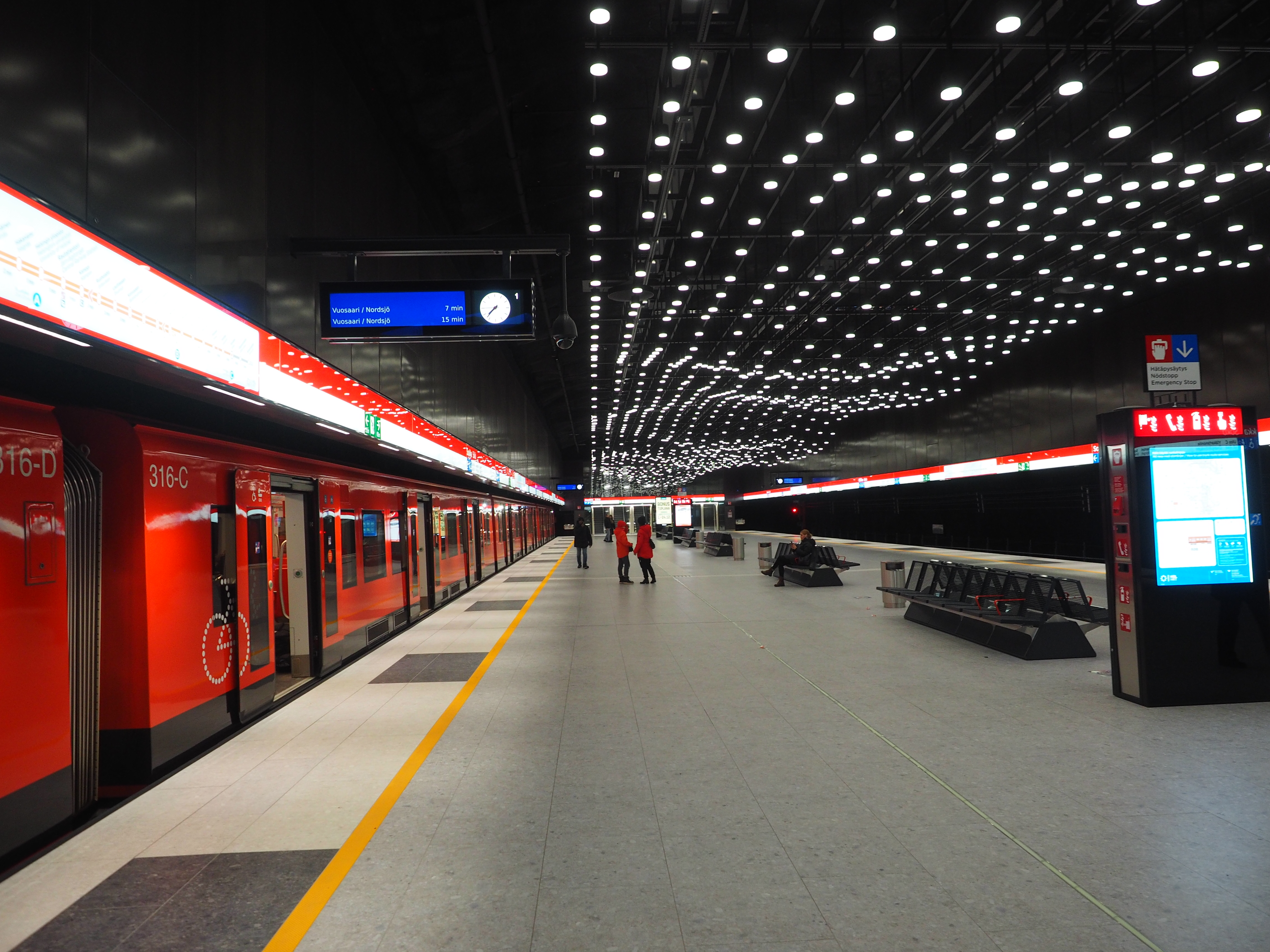
Soukka metro station
