= Finnoo metro station =

Station on the Länsimetro extension of the Helsinki Metro

Coordinates: 60°09′11″N 24°42′40″E

Finnoo Finno
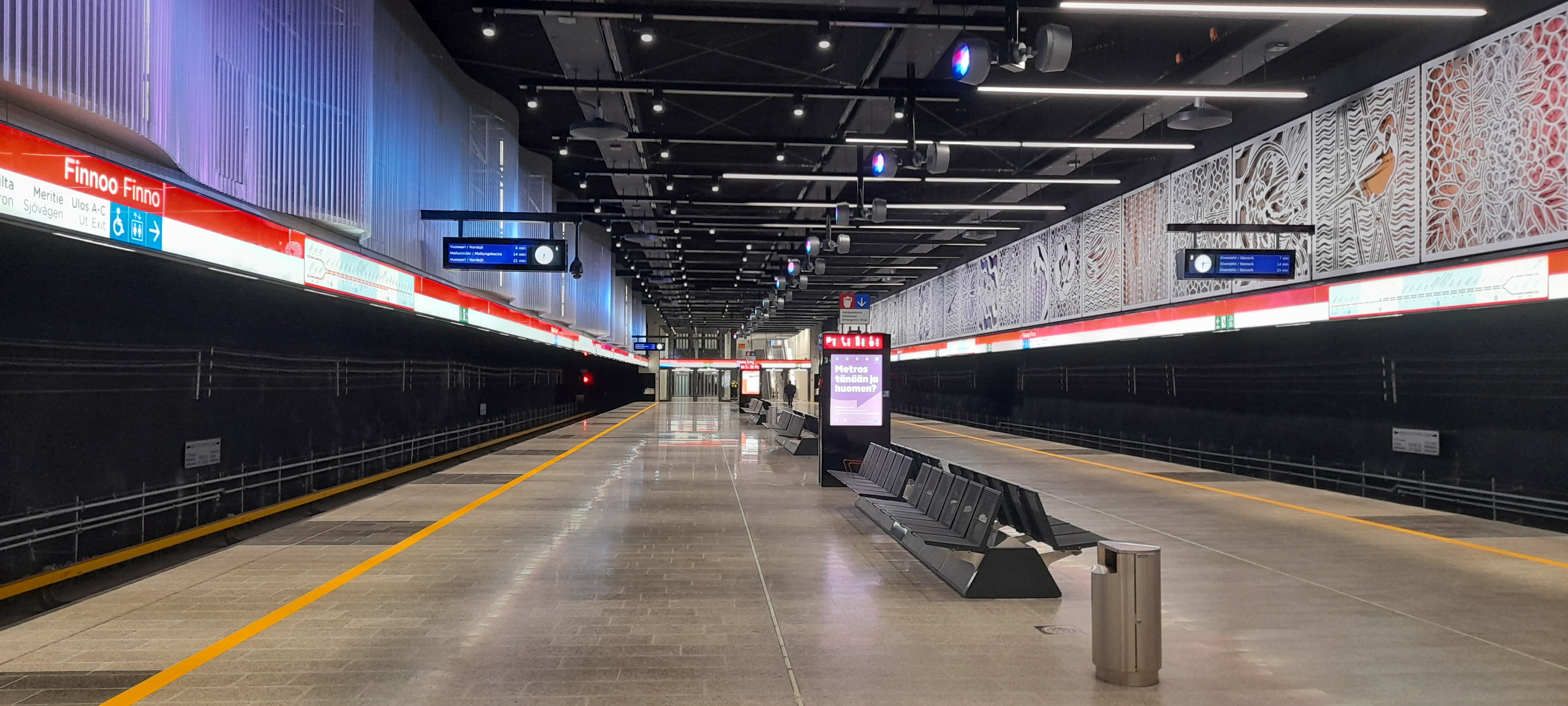
- Finnoo metro station after opening in 2022

General information
- Location: Suomenoja, Espoo
- System: Helsinki Metro station
- Platforms: Island platform
- Tracks: 2
- Connections: HSL buses 111, 143, 147, 543

Construction
- Structure type: Underground
- Depth: 35.7 metres (117 ft)
- Accessible: Yes

Other information
- Fare zone: С

History
- Opened: 3 December 2022

Services
| Preceding station | Helsinki Metro | Following station |
|---|---|---|
| Kaitaa towards Kivenlahti | M1 | Matinkylä towards Vuosaari |
Location

Finnoo (Finnish) or Finno (Swedish) is an underground station on the western metro extension (Länsimetro) of the Helsinki Metro in Finland. The entrances to the station located along the Finnoo Hill and in the commercial services block. The station opened on 3 December 2022, located 1,3 kilometres east from Kaitaa metro station and 1,6 kilometres west from Matinkylä metro station.

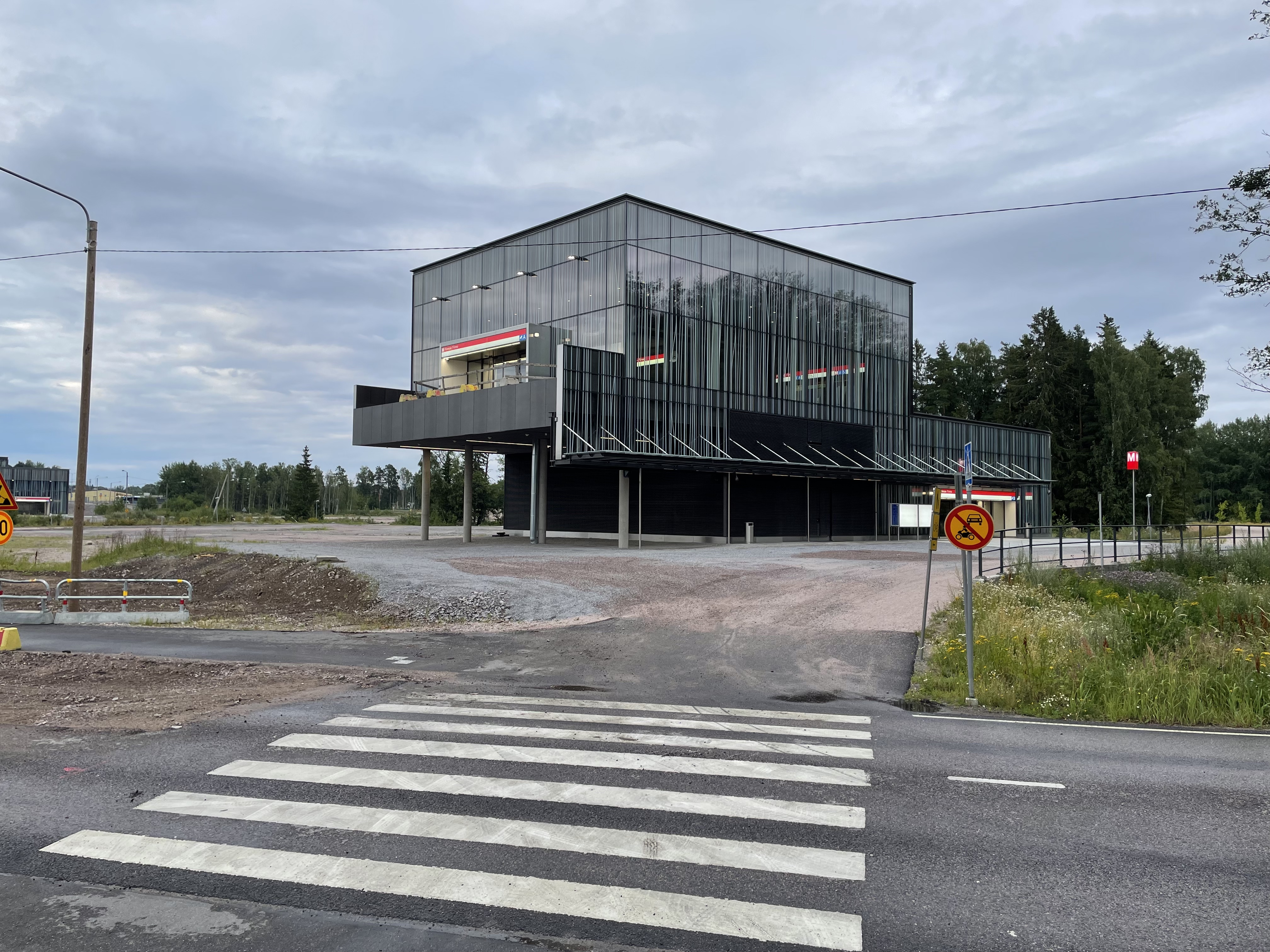
Finnoo metro station
