= Kaitaa =

Kaitaa Kaitans
- District of Espoo
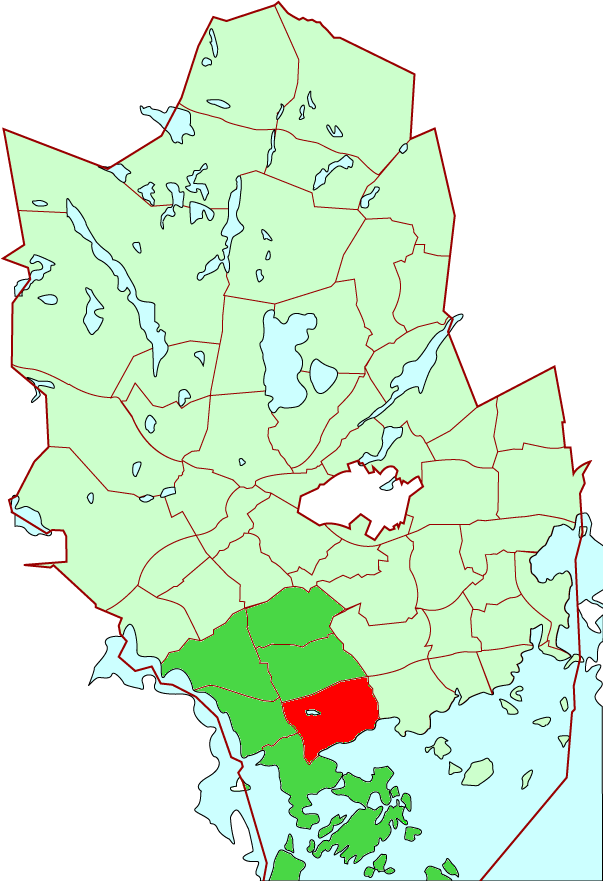
- Location of Kaitaa within Espoo
- Coordinates: 60°09′N 24°42′E
- Country: Finland
- Municipality: Espoo
- Region: Uusimaa
- Sub-region: Greater Helsinki
- Main District: Suur-Espoonlahti
- Inner District(s): Ali-Suomenoja, Bondaksenmäki, Finnoonlahti, Finnoonniitty, Hannuksenpelto, Hannusjärvi, Hyljelahti, Hyljemäki, Iivisniemi, Kaitamäki, Suomenoja, Yli-Suomenoja

Population (2006)
  - Total: 6,043

Languages
  - Finnish: 86.4 %
  - Swedish: 9.2 %
  - Other: 4.4 %
- Jobs: 1,519

Kaitaa (Finnish) or Kaitans (Swedish) is a district of southern Espoo, Finland, located south of the Länsiväylä highway, with a population of 6000.

Kaitaa mostly consists of detached houses, and contains the Hannusjärvi recreational area. There has been a preservation attempt in May 1998 to save the future of the lake.

In the southern part of the district is the Iivisniemi apartment building area.

Espoo plans high buildings along the coast-line.

== Notable natives ==
- Timo Soini, member of the Parliament of Finland, candidate in the 2006 Finnish presidential election
- Jari Sarasvuo, owner of Trainers' House

== Schools ==
There are three schools in the Iivisniemi-Kaitaa area. The Iivisniemi school contains classes 1-6 and the Kaitaa school contains classes 7-9. The Kaitaa gymnasium provides matriculatory tuition. Part of the student places in the Kaitaa school and the Kaitaa gymnasium have been reserved for students emphasising on visual art tuition.

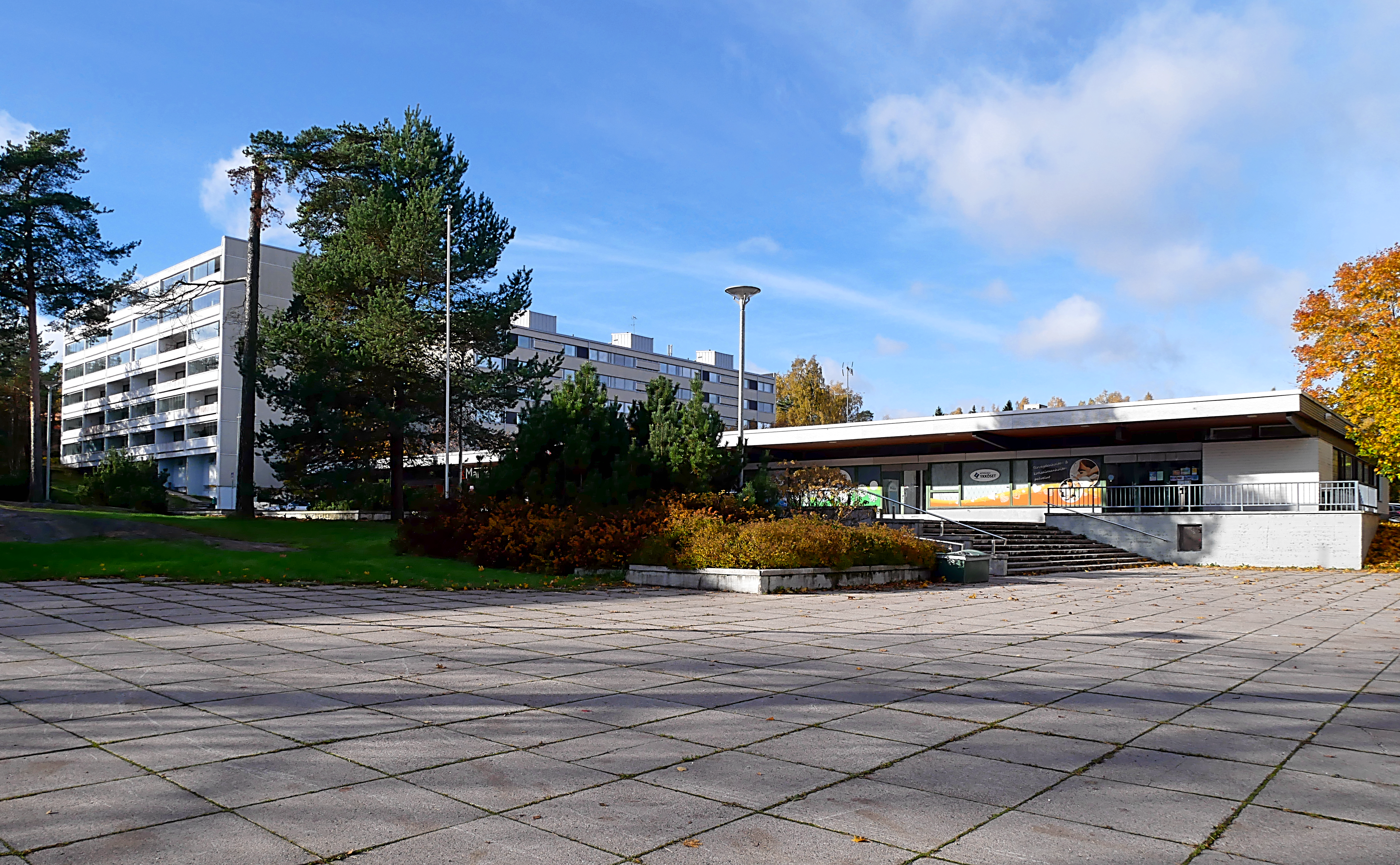
Iivisniemi in Kaitaa

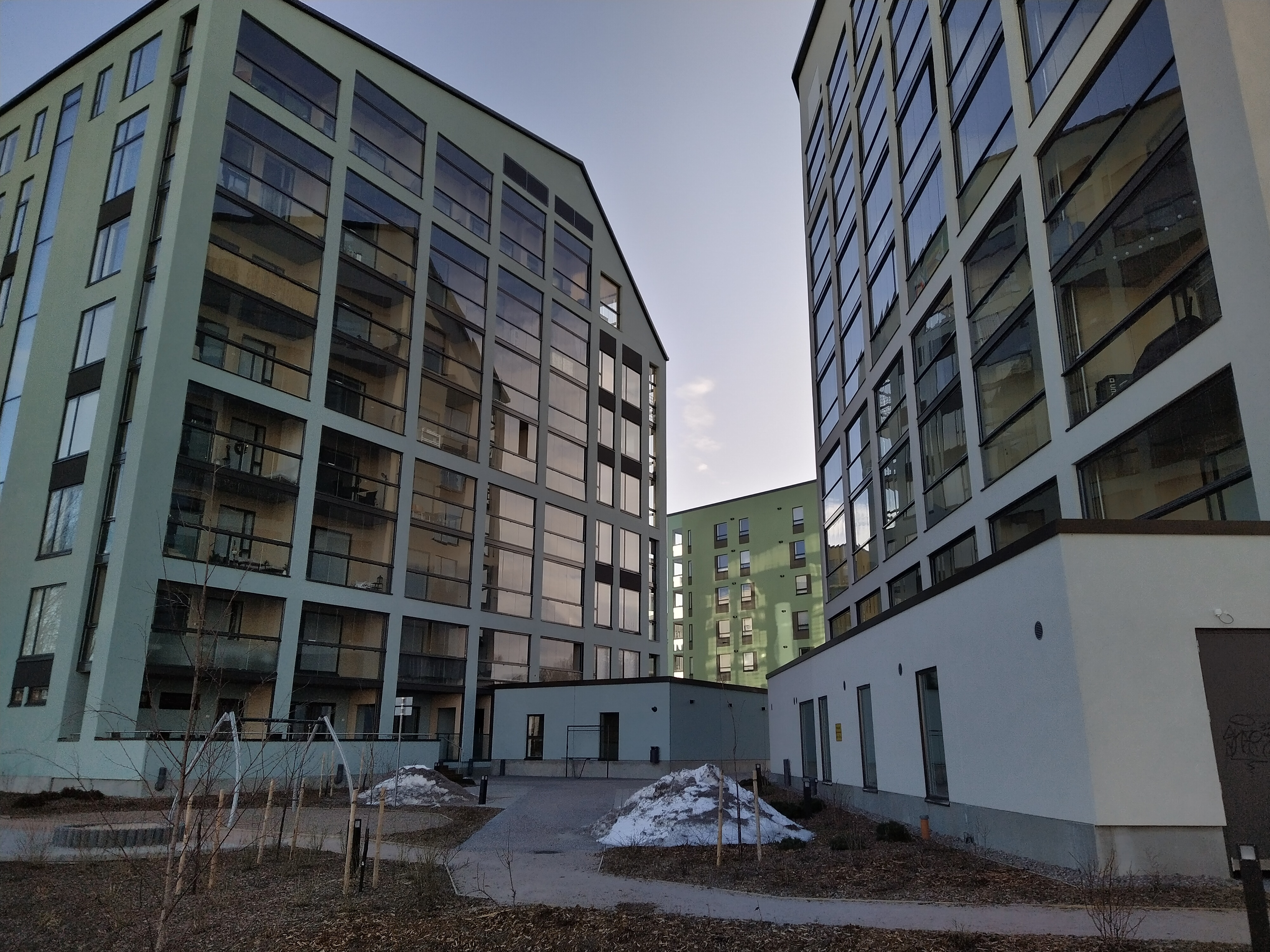
Apartment buildings near Finnoo metro station in February 2023

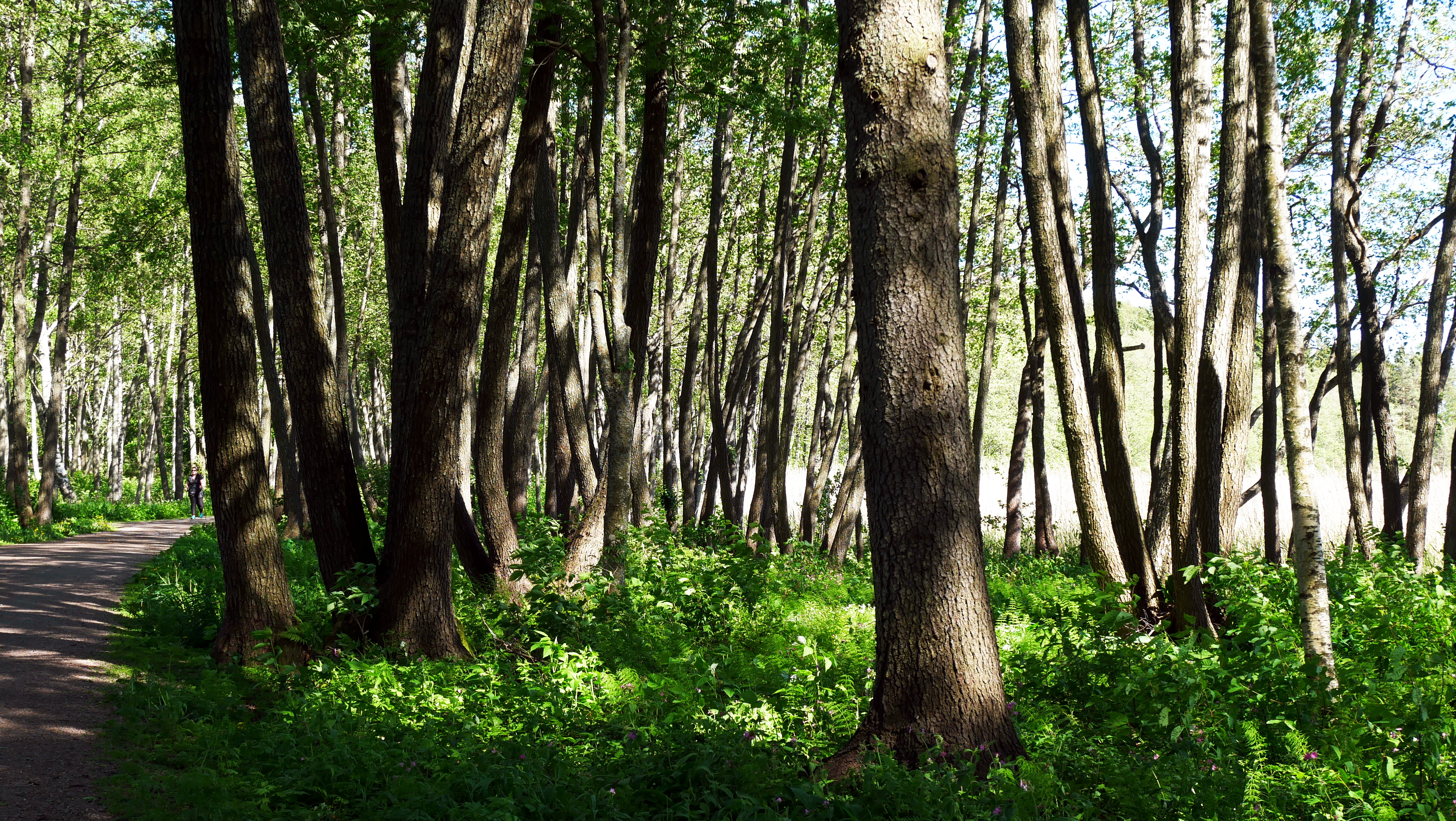
Coastal paths in Kaitaa
