= Espoonlahti =

Espoonlahti Esboviken
- District of Espoo
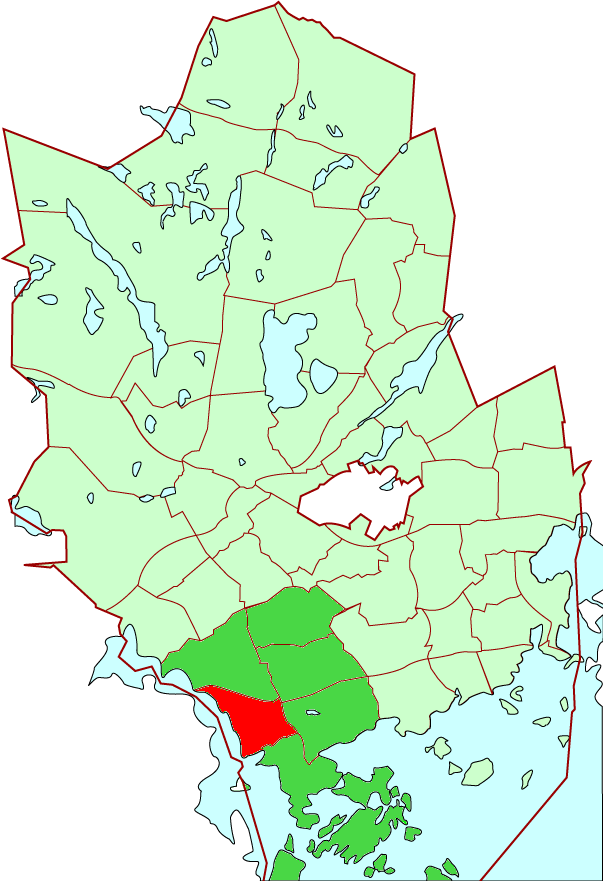
- Location of Espoonlahti within Espoo shown in green, Kanta-Espoonlahti in red.
- Coordinates: 60°9′00″N 24°39′30″E
- Country: Finland
- Municipality: Espoo
- Region: Uusimaa
- Sub-region: Greater Helsinki
- Main District: Suur-Espoonlahti
- Inner District(s): Espoonlahden keskus, Kivenlahti, Laurinlahti, Soukka

Population (2013/14)
  - Total: 52,465

Languages
  - Finnish: 83.0 %
  - Swedish: 9.5 %
  - Other: 7.4 %
- Jobs: 2,821

Espoonlahti (Finnish) or Esboviken (Swedish) (literally The Bay of Espoo or Espoo Bay) is one of the five major urban areas of Espoo, a city in Finland. It lies along the south-western coast of Espoo, bounded to the west by the bay of the same name, to the south by the shores of the Gulf of Finland, to the west by the Finnoo (Finnå) valley, to the east of the municipal border of Kirkkonummi, and to the north by the forests of Espoo central forest area. This total area of about 4,800 hectares is further divided into areas called Soukka, Suvisaaristo, Kaitaa, Nöykkiö, Latokaski and Saunalahti, with one greater center called Espoonlahden keskus ( Espoonlahti center). Areas known as Laurinlahti, Ylä-Kivenlahti, Ala-Kivenlahti and Iivisniemi are also part of the Espoonlahti district. Yet another name pertinent to this area is Kanta-Espoonlahti (Espoonlahti Proper), which includes Espoonlahden keskus, Soukanmäki (Soukka Hill), Kivenlahti, Laurinlahti and Soukanniemi (Soukka Peninsula).

== History ==
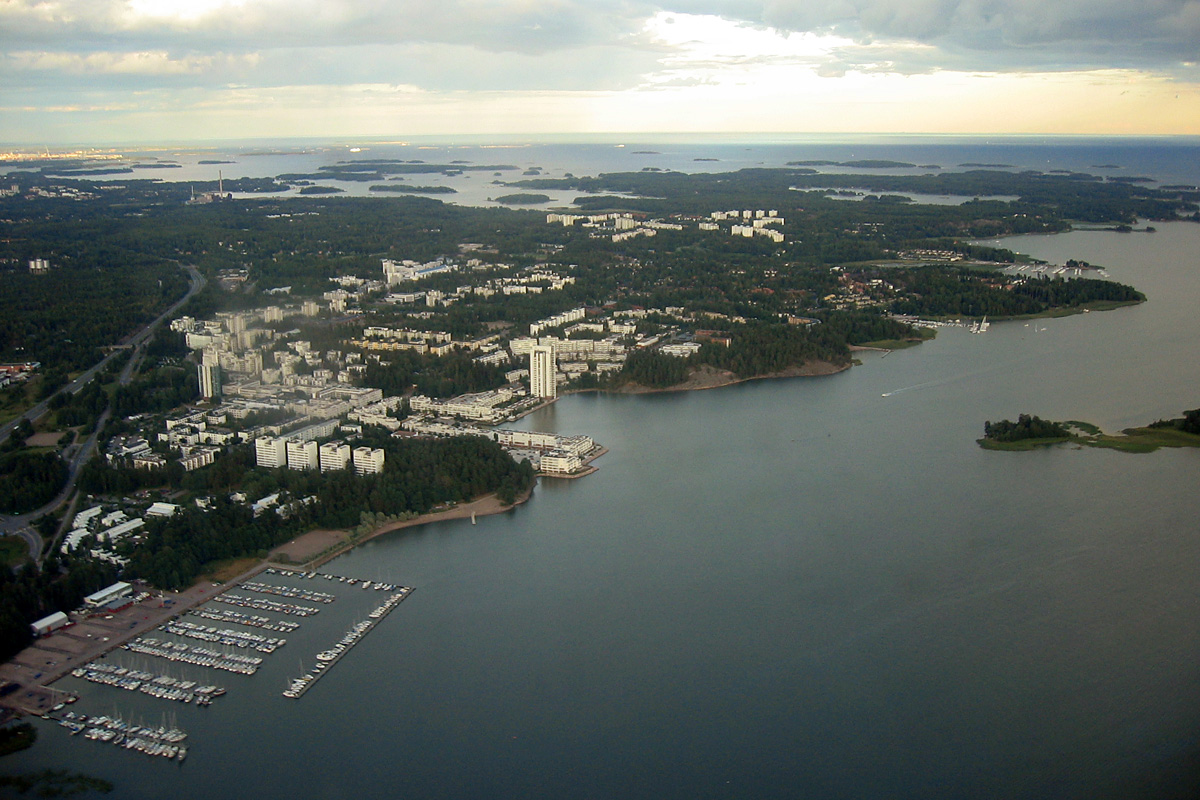
An aerial view of Espoonlahti with Kivenlahti in the foreground, 2003.

Areas along the Bay of Espoonlahti as well as the shores and islands of the Gulf of Finland belong to the oldest inhabited parts of Espoo with traces of human presence reaching to the Bronze Age. Certain pollens in sediment samples from Lake Hannusjärvi indicate permanent inhabitation and agriculture in and around the Bay of Finnoonlahti area about year 1000. The oldest villages in Espoonlahti are those of Soukka and Kivenlahti. They were important enough to be marked by their Swedish names Sökö and Stensvik on maps as early as in 1540. Espoonlahti Bay provided an important route for the Hanse trade ships and for those of the farmer salesmen from Espoo inland villages. Like all Espoo this area was still a typical rural area in the 1860s - only seldom disturbed by any industrial activity. The vast majority of changes that lead to modern Espoonlahti started with a great influx of new inhabitants after World War II. Things started to move rapidly after the Soviet Union returned the neighbouring Porkkala in 1956. The 1960s saw joined regional planning efforts between architects and housing companies who aimed to plan and build entire housing areas at one go. Those for the Soukka - Kivenlahti area were drawn by Alvar Aalto in 1964, while plans made for Laurinlahti by Espoo planners were successfully opposed by local residents assisted by the brothers Suomalainen. The most northerly point of Espoonlahti on the Bay of Espoonlahti is Saunalahti (Bastvik), whose urbanisation started in 2001 with asphatisation old roads and was followed in 2002 by intensive construction work of mainly residential buildings.

== Modern times ==
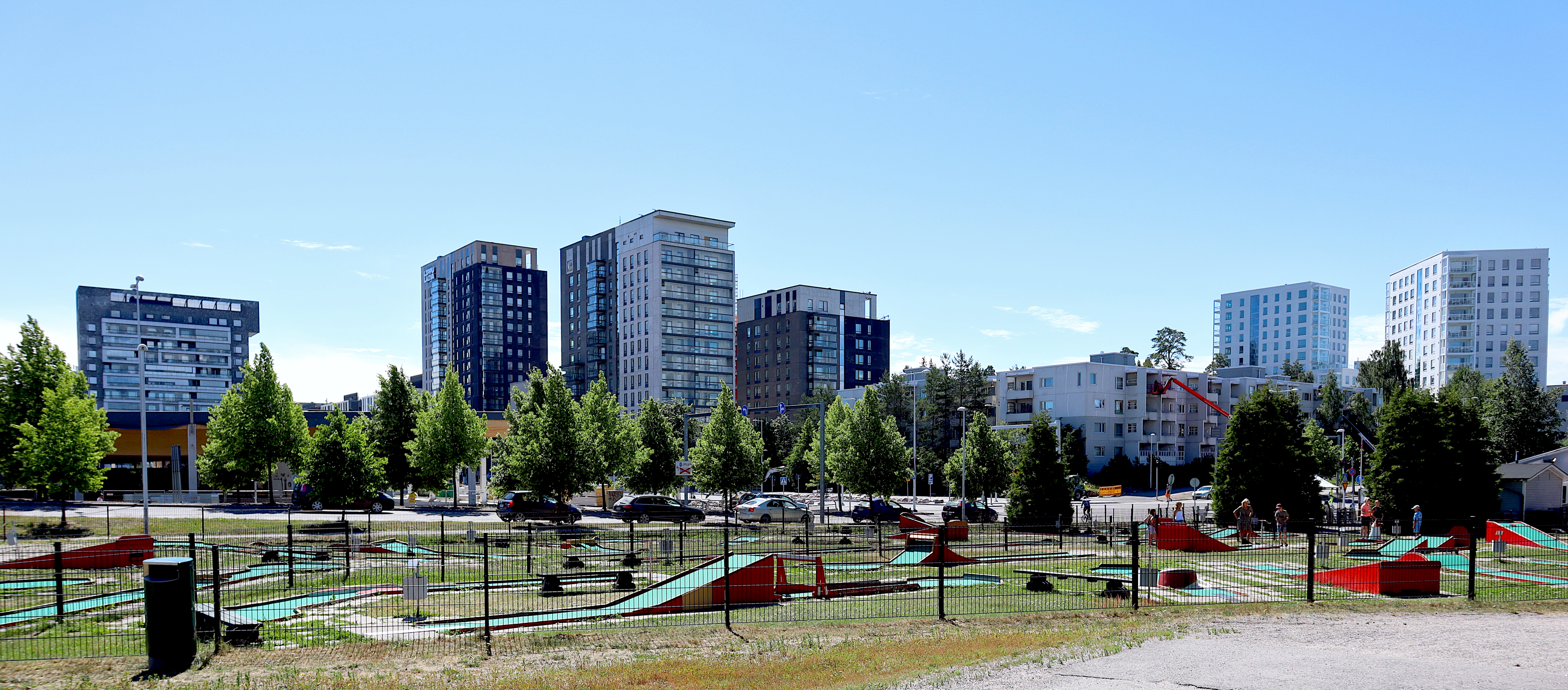
Espoonlahti in 2022.

With more than 52 000 inhabitants Espoonlahti is today the second largest of Espoo urban centers. It is a markedly residential area that in 2004 was able to employ 39% of its inhabitants. Espoonlahti center is characterized by a tree lined shopping street Espoonlahdenkatu, where most of the services are found. Among them is the shopping center Lippulaiva built in 1994, the market place, several banks and some small restaurants. The swimming hall, health center and Espoonlahti Church are all found close by. As Espoonlahden keskus is one of the stations of the western branch of the Helsinki metropolitan area underground (Länsimetro), further urban development is ongoing there. It includes several residential buildings, facilities for cultural services and an addition to Lippulaiva, which lies in the vicinity of the underground station, opened in 2022. There are five stations in the greater Espoonlahti area: Finnoo, Kaitaa, Soukka, Espoonlahti and Kivenlahti.

== See also ==
- Districts of Espoo
