= Kivenlahti metro station =

Terminus of the Länsimetro extension of the Helsinki Metro

Coordinates: 60.155419°N 24.635997°E

Kivenlahti Stensvik
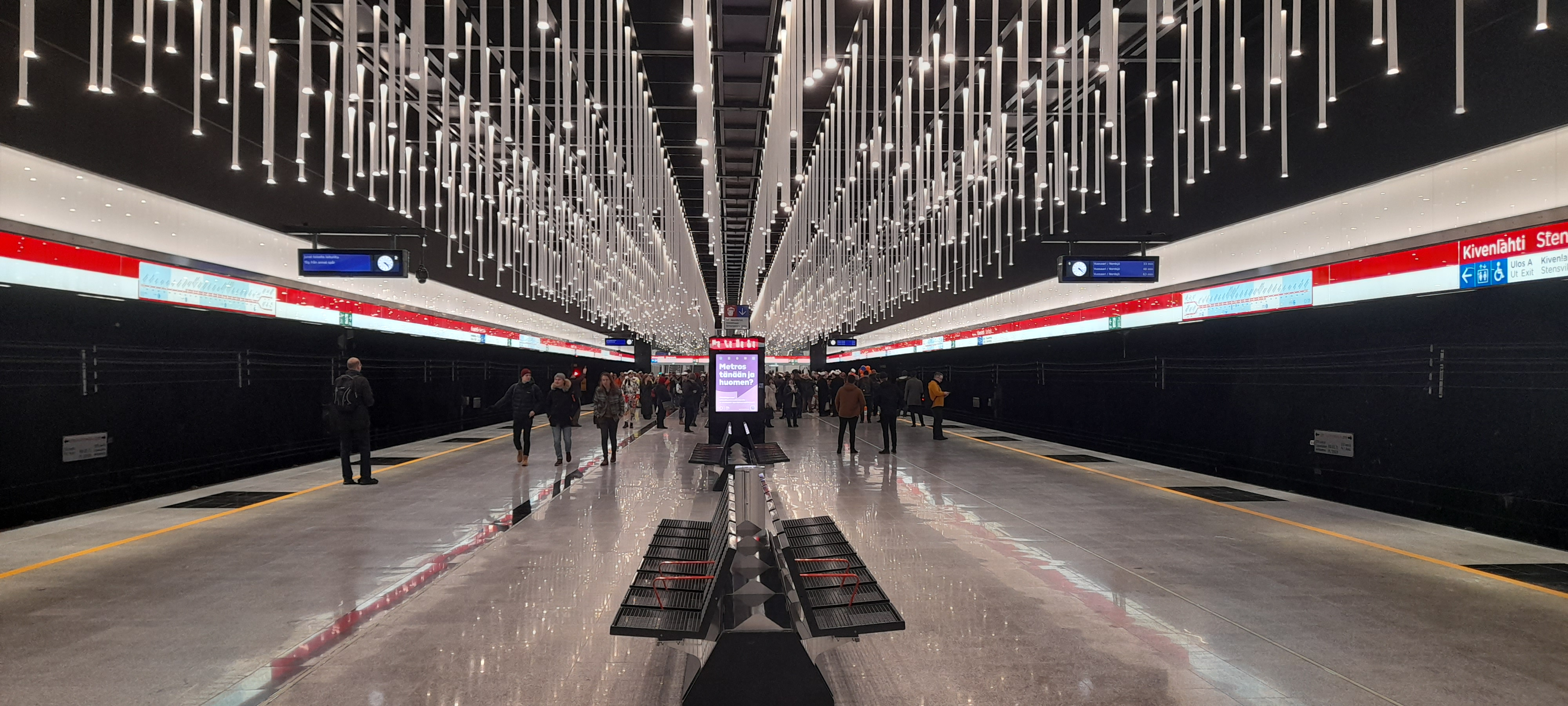
- Kivenlahti metro station after opening in 2022

General information
- Location: Kivenlahti, Espoo
- System: Helsinki Metro station
- Platforms: Island platform
- Tracks: 2
- Connections: HSL buses 149, 164A, 165, 165N, 542, 543, 544

Construction
- Structure type: Underground
- Depth: 23 metres (75 ft)
- Accessible: Yes

Other information
- Fare zone: С

History
- Opened: 3 December 2022

Services
Preceding station	Helsinki Metro	Following station
Terminus	M1	Espoonlahti towards Vuosaari
Location

Kivenlahti (Finnish) or Stensvik (Swedish) is an underground terminus station on the western metro extension (Länsimetro) of the Helsinki Metro in Finland. The entrance to the station is located to the south of Kivenlahdentie in the area between Merivirta and Kivenlahdenkatu. The buildings at the West Entrance are located along the Kivenlahdentie. North side entrance is part of the bus to the terminal building. The Eastern entrance and the flagpole are located at the end of the Seaway Pedestrian Route. The station opened along with the second phase of Länsimetro 3 December 2022, and is located one kilometre west of Espoonlahti metro station, near the municipal border between Espoo and Kirkkonummi.
