= Rautatientori metro station =

Helsinki Metro station

Rautatientori Järnvägstorget Central Railway Station
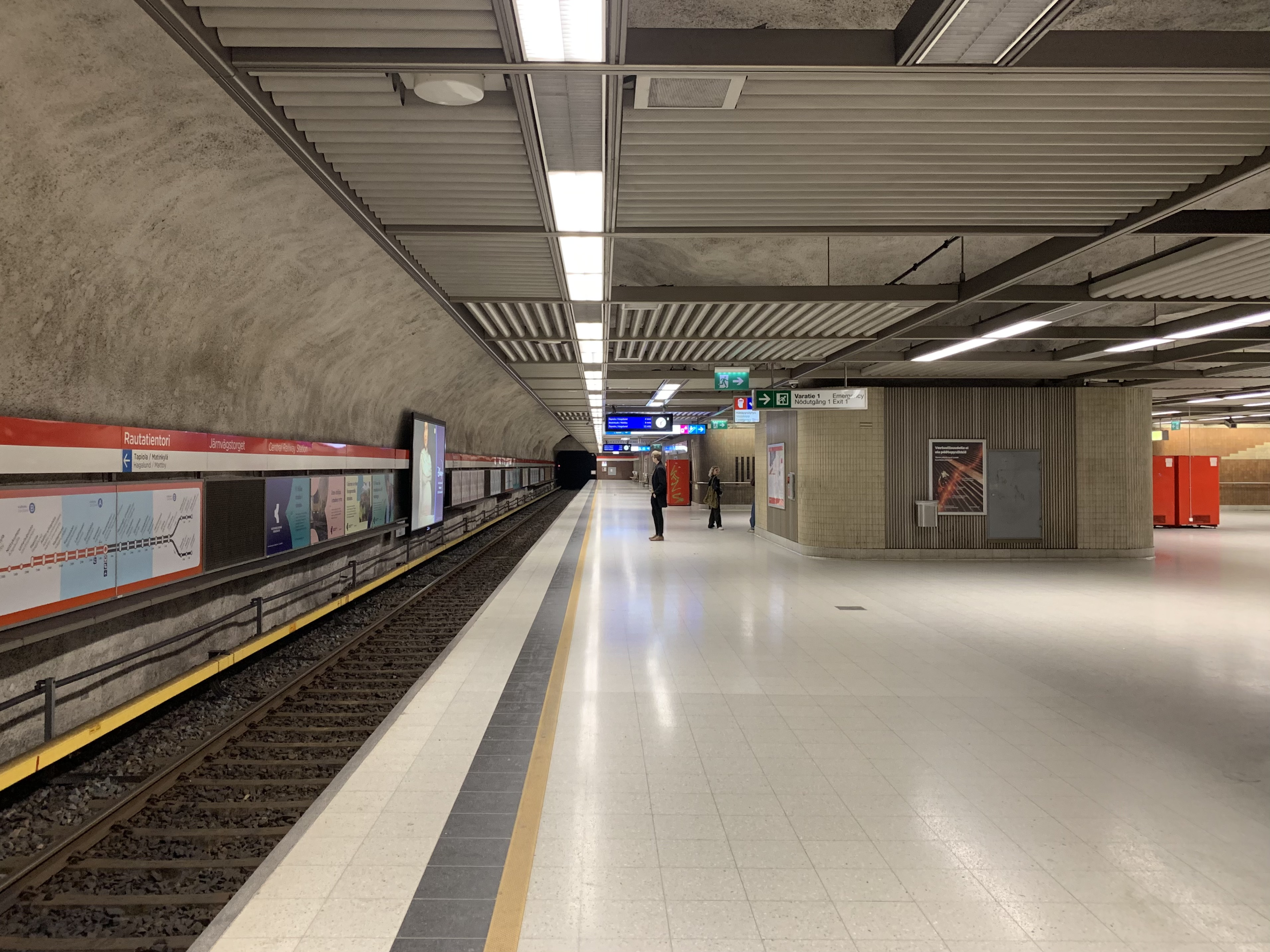

General information
- Coordinates: 60°10′14″N 024°56′26″E
- System: Helsinki Metro station
- Owner: HKL
- Platforms: island platform
- Tracks: 2
- Connections: Tram; Buses including trunk routes 40 200 300 600; Commuter rail; Long-distance rail

Construction
- Structure type: Underground
- Depth: 27 m (89 ft)
- Accessible: Yes

Other information
- Fare zone: A

History
- Opened: 1 July 1982

Passengers
- 76,600 daily

Services
Preceding station	Helsinki Metro	Following station
Kamppi towards Kivenlahti	M1	University of Helsinki towards Vuosaari
Kamppi towards Tapiola	M2	University of Helsinki towards Mellunmäki
Location

The Central Railway Station metro station (Finnish: Rautatientorin metroasema, Swedish: Järnvägstorgets metrostation; lit. "Railway Square" in both languages) is a station on the Helsinki Metro. The entrance is located in the Asematunneli main hall, which has an exit to the Helsinki Central Railway Station. It is among the only Helsinki Metro stations whose names are announced in English, in addition to Finnish and Swedish.

As one of the original metro stations, Central Railway Station was opened on 1 July 1982 (as Kaivokatu / Brunnsgatan) and was designed by Rolf Björkstam, Erkki Heino, and Eero Kostiainen. It is located 0.5 kilometres (0.31 mi) from Kamppi metro station, and 0.6 kilometres (0.37 mi) from the University of Helsinki metro station. The station is situated at a depth of 27 metres (89 ft) below ground level and 22 metres (72 ft) below sea level.

In original line maps, the station was named Kaivokatu / Brunnsgatan (Kaivokatu / Brunnsgatan).

Since 1985, the station has featured a painting titled Metrolinjat by Jouko Christiansson. The platform level also contains the four-part sculpture Metron kasvoja sunnuntai-iltana, completed in 2007 by Sanna Karlsson-Sutisna.

== Architecture ==
From the middle section of the platform, a single escalator shaft leads up to the ticket hall. There are four escalators in the shaft: when viewed from the bottom, the two leftmost escalators and the rightmost escalator go up, while the third escalator from the right goes down. The elevators connecting the platform level to the ticket hall, known as the Kompassi level, are located in a transverse corridor behind the escalator shaft.The station features an island platform typical of the Helsinki Metro, with right-hand traffic on both sides of the platform. From the Kompassi level, two elevators provide access to the surface and the station tunnel: one to station square and the other to Kaivopiha. A notable feature of the Kaivopiha elevator is that it travels diagonally both upwards and downwards. Such inclined elevators are rare globally. Similar inclined elevators can also be found at Sörnäinen metro station, Hakaniemi metro station, University of Helsinki metro station, Lauttasaari metro station, Koivusaari metro station, and Aalto University metro station.

== History ==
On 8 November 2009, a major water damage incident occurred at the station, forcing it to close for more than three months. Thousands of cubic metres of water flooded the premises, causing damage worth millions of euros. Among other things, the metro station’s elevators and escalators were severely affected. The leak was caused by a detached pipe fitting. Trains arriving from the direction of Itäkeskus turned back at Sörnäinen on the day of the incident. Metro services were later extended westward to Hakaniemi and University of Helsinki metro station. The station tunnel was closed, but the above-ground part of Helsinki Central Railway Station remained in use throughout. Water on the platforms was removed by the following day, but the station and the so-called Kompassi level remained closed. Through traffic past the station towards Kamppi and Ruoholahti resumed on 11 November, and trains began stopping at the station again on 15 February 2010. On 23 August 2019, the station was again closed due to water damage caused by heavy rainfall. Kamppi metro station was also temporarily closed, but it reopened later the same evening.

=== 2024–2025 renovation ===
A major renovation of the platform level and escalator shafts began in summer 2024, aimed at improving fire safety. This resulted in a service interruption from 3 June to 2 September, during which metro trains did not pass through the station. Instead, trains terminated at University of Helsinki metro station in the east and Kamppi metro station in the west. Additional tram service 9B operated between these stations during the disruption. The station was completely closed at the start of the renovation, as the presence of extensive scaffolding made passenger movement unsafe, and trains could not operate safely due to worker safety requirements.

The renovation includes the complete removal of the platform-level ceiling, renewal of lighting, installation of a new water supply line for sprinkler systems, construction of a barrier wall above the platform edge, installation of glass doors at the lower ends of escalators, and new smoke doors in the tunnels. Passenger services partially resumed on 2 September 2024, although construction work continued until March 2025. By autumn 2024, the original cost estimate of €8.2 million had risen to €16.4 million.

== Pictures ==
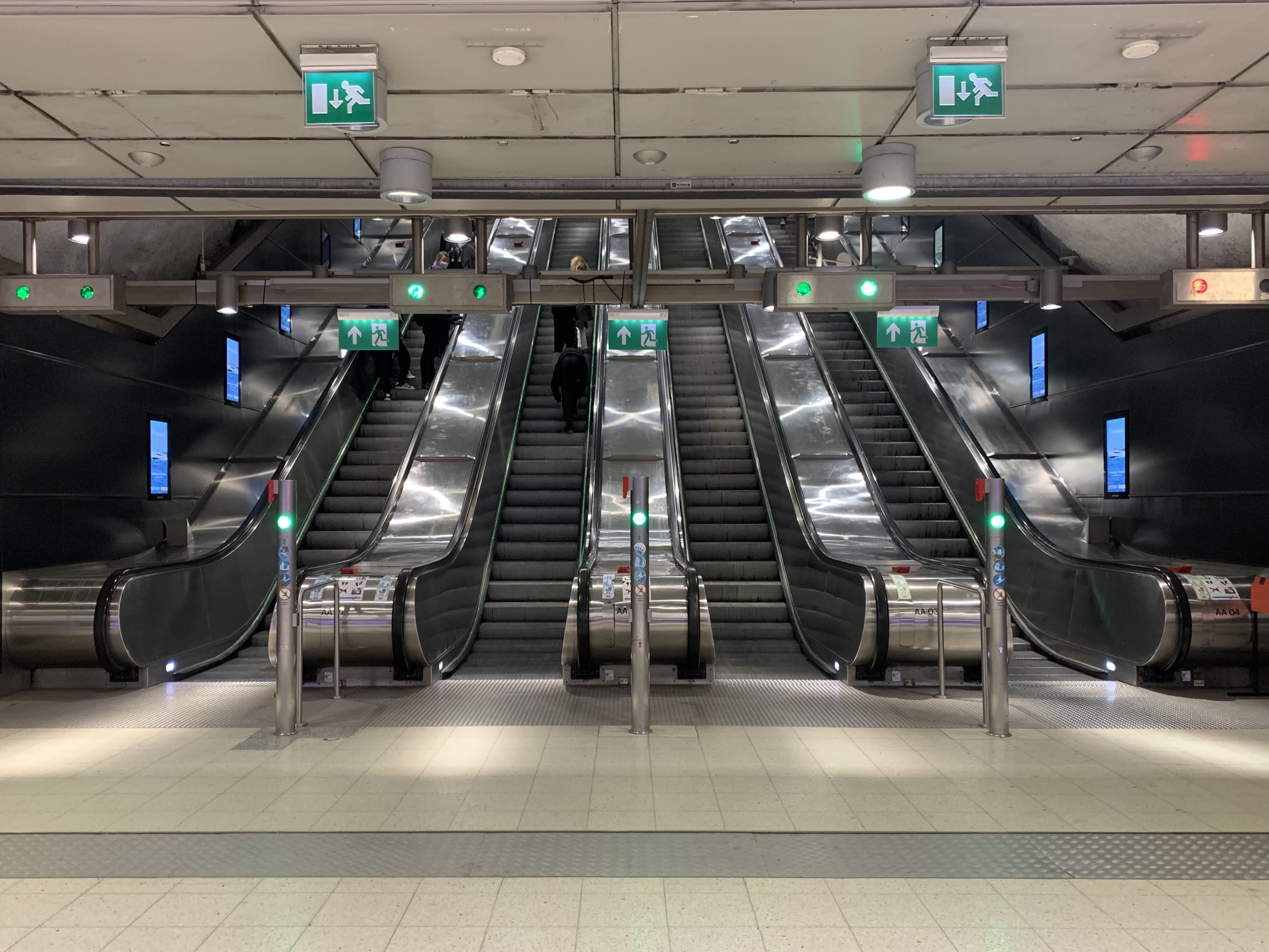
Escalators

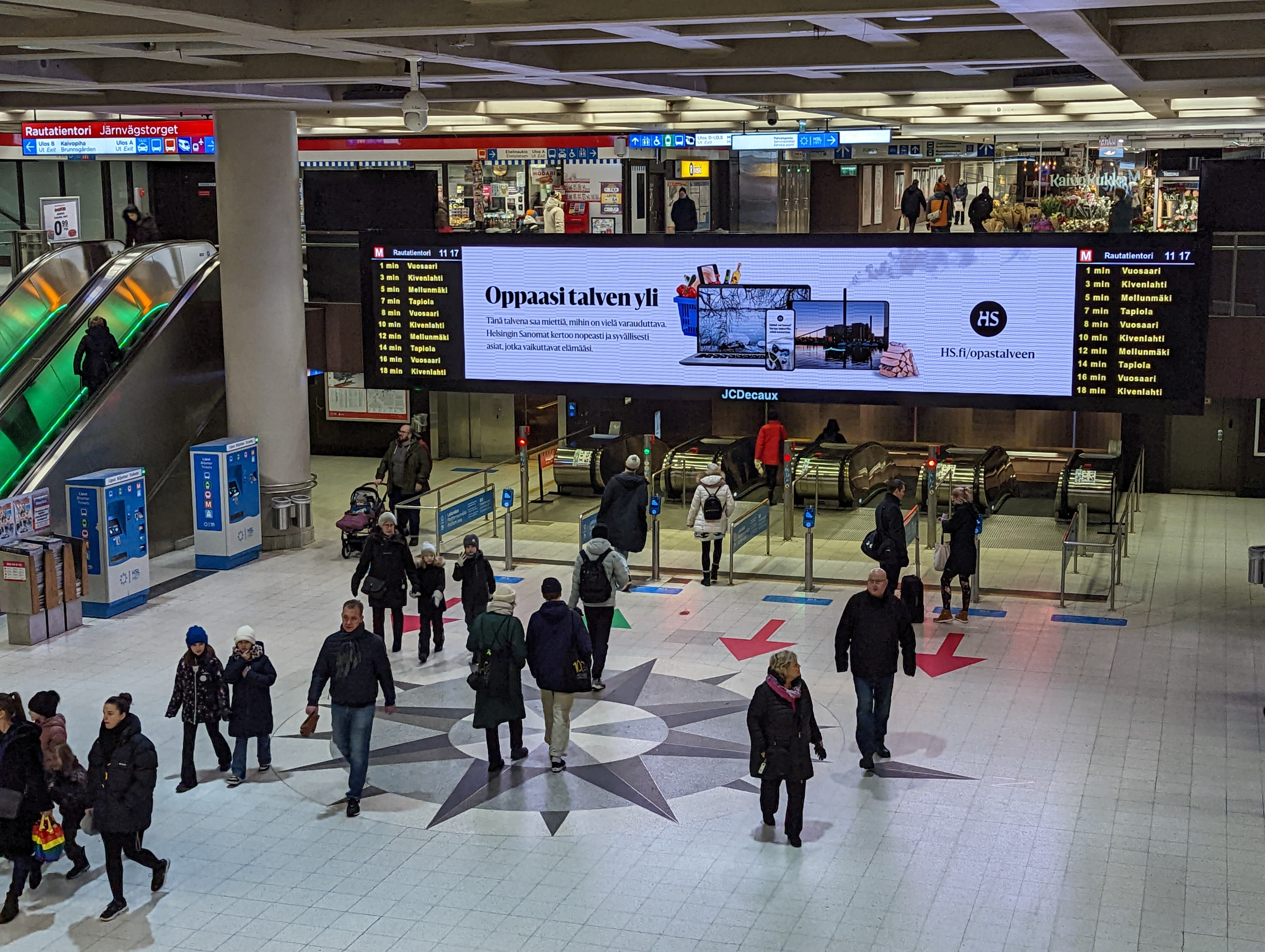
Entrance from the main tunnel

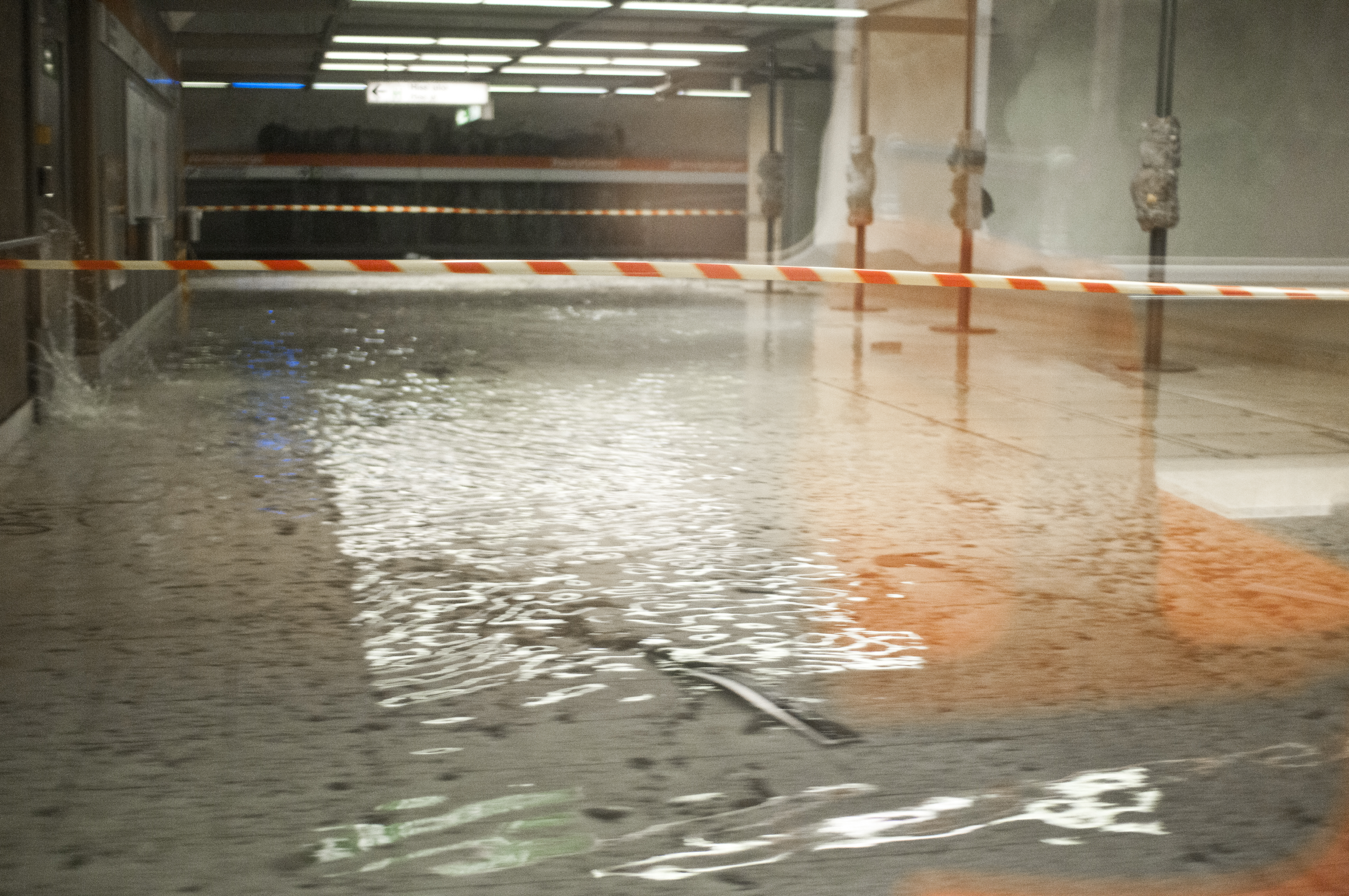
Water damage in 2009

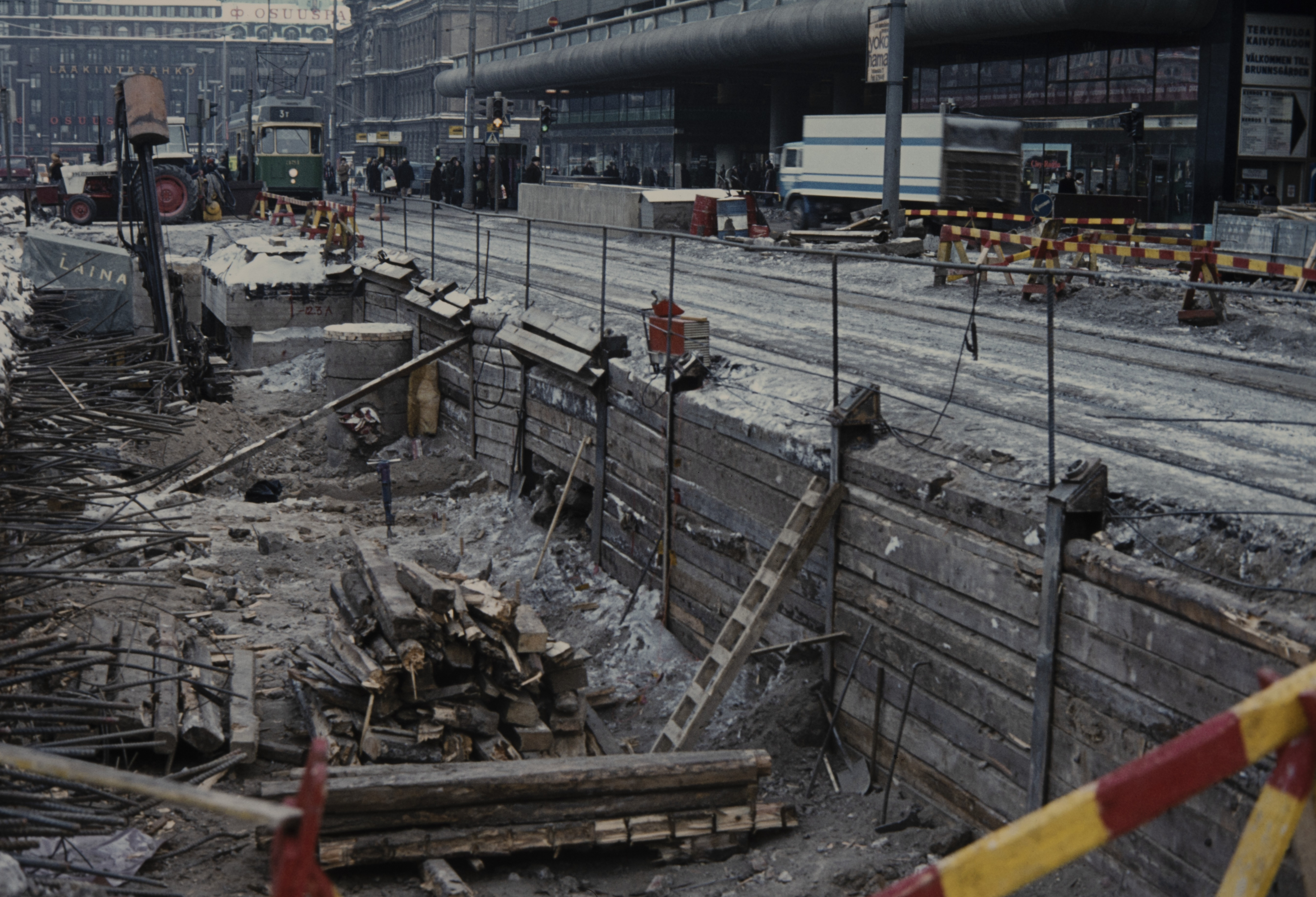
Construction of metro station in 1978
