= Helsinki second metro line =

Metro line in Helsinki, Finland

The current state of the Helsinki commuter rail network and its planned extensions.

The Helsinki second metro line is a common name for planned extensions to the Helsinki Metro, intended to be developed after the Länsimetro extension has been completed.

== Pasila metro ==
The Pasila metro would start from Kamppi metro station and include four new stations, which would be located in Töölö (underneath the Töölöntori square), at the Helsinki Olympic Stadium, in Meilahti (at Tullinpuomi) and in Pasila. Preliminary plans state that the construction of the Pasila metro line could start in 2019.

=== Airport metro and Viikki metro ===
From Pasila onwards, two branches have been planned. One of them would go to the Helsinki Airport and from there to Hyrylä in Tuusula, and the other one to Viikki. The Viikki branch would include three new stations: Kumpula, Vanhakaupunki and Viikki. Construction of these branches would happen in the 2020s.

== Laajasalo metro ==
Plans for the so-called Laajasalo metro include eight stations, of which one would be located in Santahamina and three in Laajasalo, and the rest in the centre of the city: in Katajanokka, near the Helsinki Market Square, on Esplanadi and at the Kamppi metro station, where the line would meet the existing metro line. Plans to build the Crown Bridges connecting Laajasalo to the Helsinki tram network caused plans for the Laajasalo metro to be practically abandoned.

When the Kamppi metro station was built, a second tunnel was dug underneath it in the 1970s, and this tunnel could be used as a station for a perpendicular metro line.

== Planned stations ==
Planned names		Notes
	↑	Possible continuations towards the Helsinki Airport metro or the Viikki metro
Pasila (Böle)	●
Meilahti (Mejlans)	●
Olympiastadion (Olympiastadion)	●
Töölö (Tölö)	●
Kamppi (Kampen)	●	Exchange station for the Kivenlahti/Tapiola - Mellunmäki/Vuosaari metro line
Esplanadi (Esplanaden)	●
Kauppatori (Salutorget)	●	concrete-built tunnel station
Katajanokka (Skatudden)	●
Kruunuvuorenranta (Kronobergsstranden)	●
Laajasalo (Degerö)	●
Gunillantie (Gunillavägen)	●
Santahamina (Sandhamn)	●

== See also ==
- Itämetro

== Sources ==
- Architect bureau Lahdelma & Mahlamäki Oy, Ilmari Lahdelma and Riitta Id, City design bureau: Töölön metro-osuuden kaupunkirakenteellinen ja -kuvallinen analyysi. Publications of the general planning department of the Helsinki city design bureau, 19 December 2002, number 2002:15. Helsinki city design bureau. 1458–994. Online version (PDF)
