= Kamppi metro station =

Helsinki Metro station

Kamppi Kampen
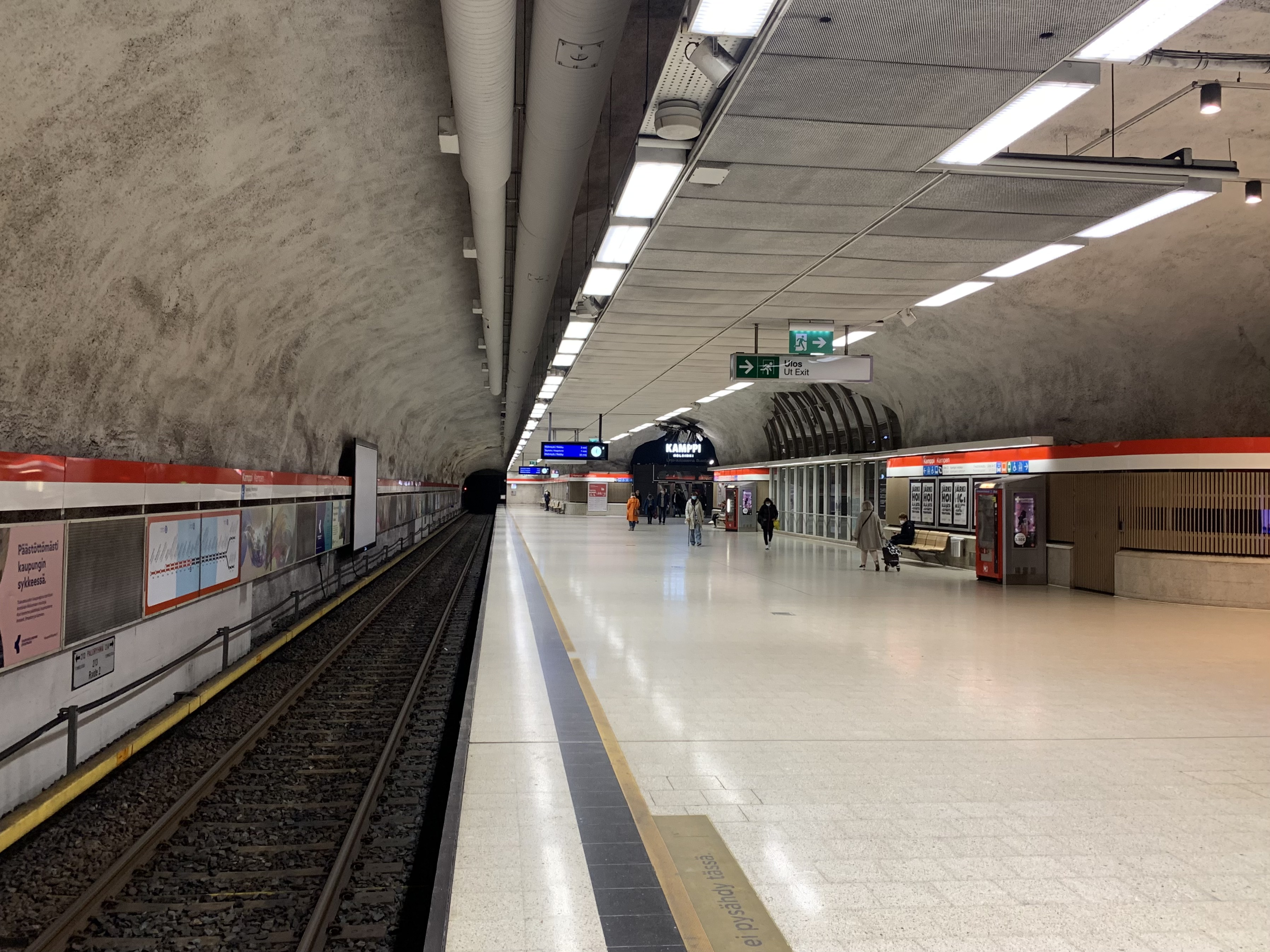

General information
- Location: Kampinkuja 1, Helsinki
- Coordinates: 60°10′08″N 24°55′55″E
- System: Helsinki Metro station
- Owner: HKL
- Platforms: 1 island platform
- Tracks: 2
- Connections: Helsinki tram lines: 7 9 HSL bus lines 20 30 24 25 37 41 42 63 69 70 108N 112N 113N 114N 125N 134N 146N 165N 173N 212 213 346 480-495 637 638 640 760-765 776 810-870; Long-distance buses

Construction
- Structure type: Underground
- Depth: 30 m (98 ft)
- Parking: 250 spaces
- Accessible: Yes

Other information
- Fare zone: A

History
- Opened: 1 March 1983

Passengers
- 39,000 daily

Services
Preceding station	Helsinki Metro	Following station
Ruoholahti towards Kivenlahti	M1	Rautatientori towards Vuosaari
Ruoholahti towards Tapiola	M2	Rautatientori towards Mellunmäki
Location

Kamppi metro station (Finnish: Kampin metroasema; Swedish: Kampens metrostation) is a station on the Helsinki Metro. In addition to serving the area around Kamppi in central Helsinki, the station is integrated with the Kamppi Center bus terminal and shopping complex. Kamppi is served by both lines M1 and M2. The street address is Kampinkuja 1. The station is located 1.2 kilometres (0.75 mi) from the Ruoholahti metro station, and 0.5 kilometres (0.31 mi) from the Central Railway Station.

The station is the deepest of the Helsinki Metro stations, at a depth of 31 metres (102 ft) below ground level and 15 metres (49 ft) below sea level. Like other underground metro stations in Helsinki, Kamppi metro station was designed to also serve as a bomb shelter.

The Kamppi metro station is the second busiest metro station in the Helsinki Metro after the Rautatientori metro station. In 2023 the Kamppi metro station was visited by about 45,700 passengers per day on weekdays.

A new eastern entrance with its own ticket hall, connecting directly to Kamppi Center, was opened on 2 June 2005. Both the original entrance and the new entrance have three sets of escalators and elevators to the station platform. Normally one set of escalators is going down and the other two up. The station platform is located between the tracks and is currently almost continuous between the exits.

Until 1993 the station served as the western terminus of the metro line. When the metro reached Ruoholahti, the turning track at Kamppi had to be changed. The turning track was taken into use in 2016 when the metro started trafficking at 2.5-minute intervals and all trains could not turn around at Ruoholahti.

The old western entrance to the station was closed down in December 2023. Currently the only entrance and exit in the Kamppi metro station is located in the Kamppi Center.

== History ==
The station was opened on 1 March 1983, designed by Eero Hyvämäki, Jukka Karhunen, and Risto Parkkinen, who won the design contest for the station in 1971. The new eastern entrance was opened on 2 June 2005 in connection to the inauguration of the new Kamppi bus terminal.

The escalators in the old entrance to the station, 65 metres in length, were built in the Soviet Union. The lifting height of the escalators is 23.3 metres, and for a long time they were the longest escalators in Finland; they were only surpassed in 2023 by the escalators at the Finnoo metro station in Espoo, with a length of 78 metres.

=== Demolition of the western ticket hall ===
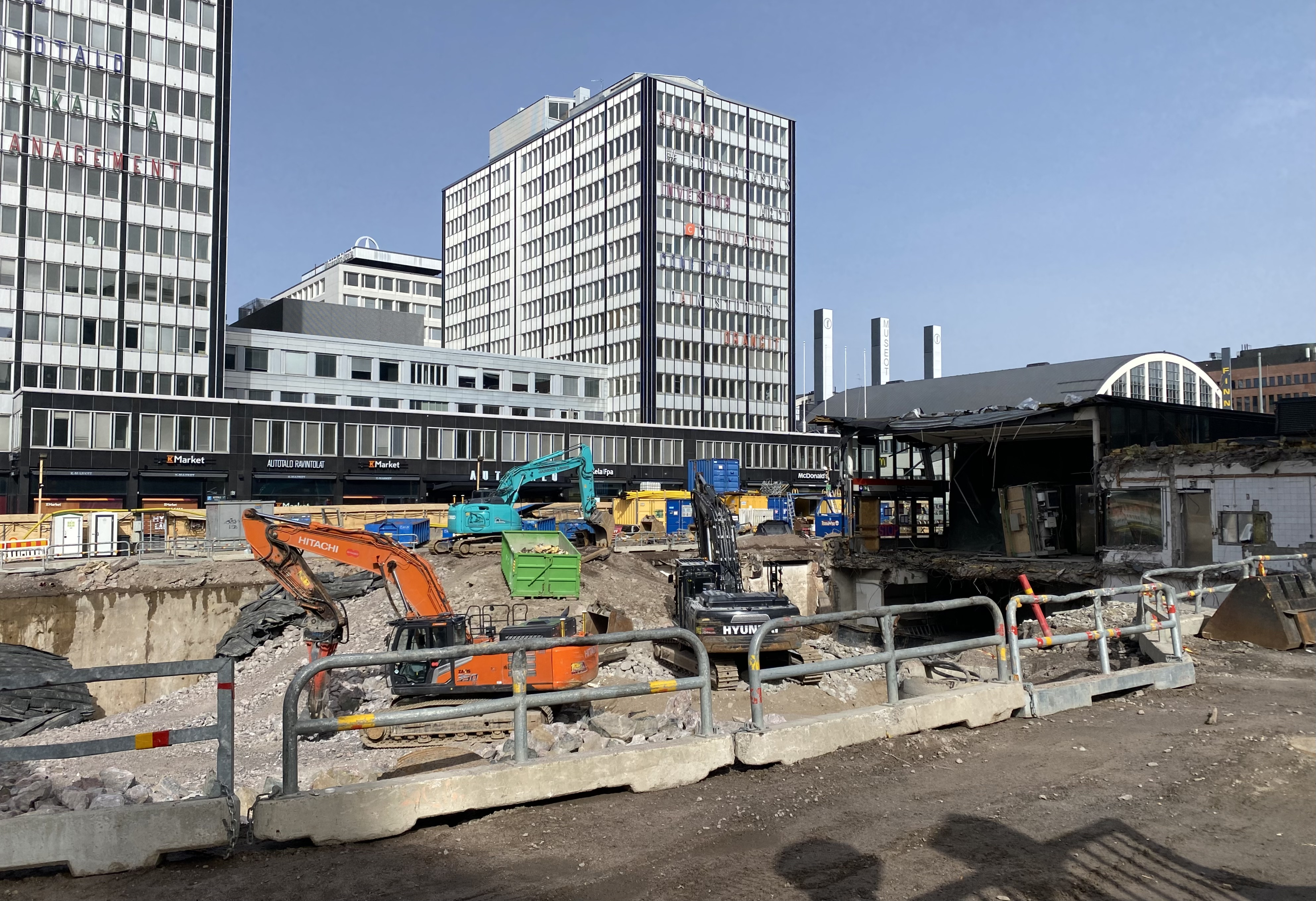
Demolition of the western ticket hall of the Kamppi metro station in April 2024. In the background is the Autotalo building.

The original ticket hall located on the street Fredrikinkatu was closed down on 4 December 2023. The new Kamppi Health and Wellness Centre will be built in its place, with a new entrance to the metro station on the ground floor. Demolition of the old ticket hall started in early 2024.

== Second station platform hall ==
The Kamppi metro station was built with a secondary platform located perpendicularly under the one in use, reserved for a future metro extension. The hall was dug in the 1970s in connection to the construction of the current station as it was cheaper this way. The bottom of the hall is about thirty metres below sea level, about fifteen metres below the current platform hall. This secondary platform hall is not equipped in any way. The hall is designed to allow metro trains to travel perpendicular to the trains on the current metro level. The hall can currently be accessed by a spiralling staircase leading down from an exhibition showcase in the centre of the current station platform. If the second platform hall is ever taken into use, a set of escalators will be installed at the same spot. The second platform hall has effective air conditioning intended to remove the radon gas leaking to the space from the rock walls.

== Art ==
Since 2005 the Kamppi metro station has featured the artwork Gekko by Pekka Paikkari, Kristina Riska and Kati Tuominen. In addition, the platform level has featured the artwork Kaupungin juuret by Otto Karvonen since 2013.

== Pictures ==
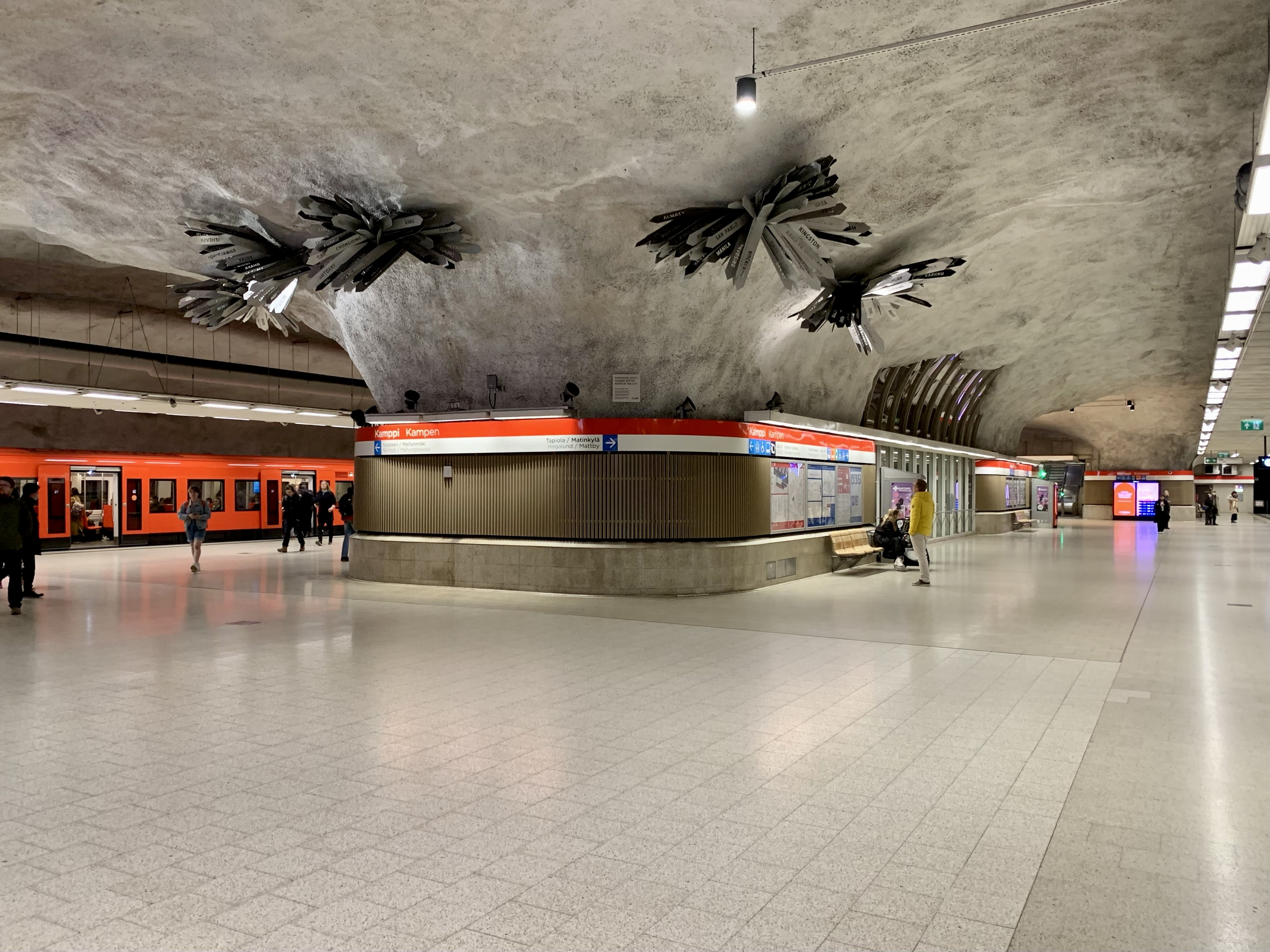
Platform level

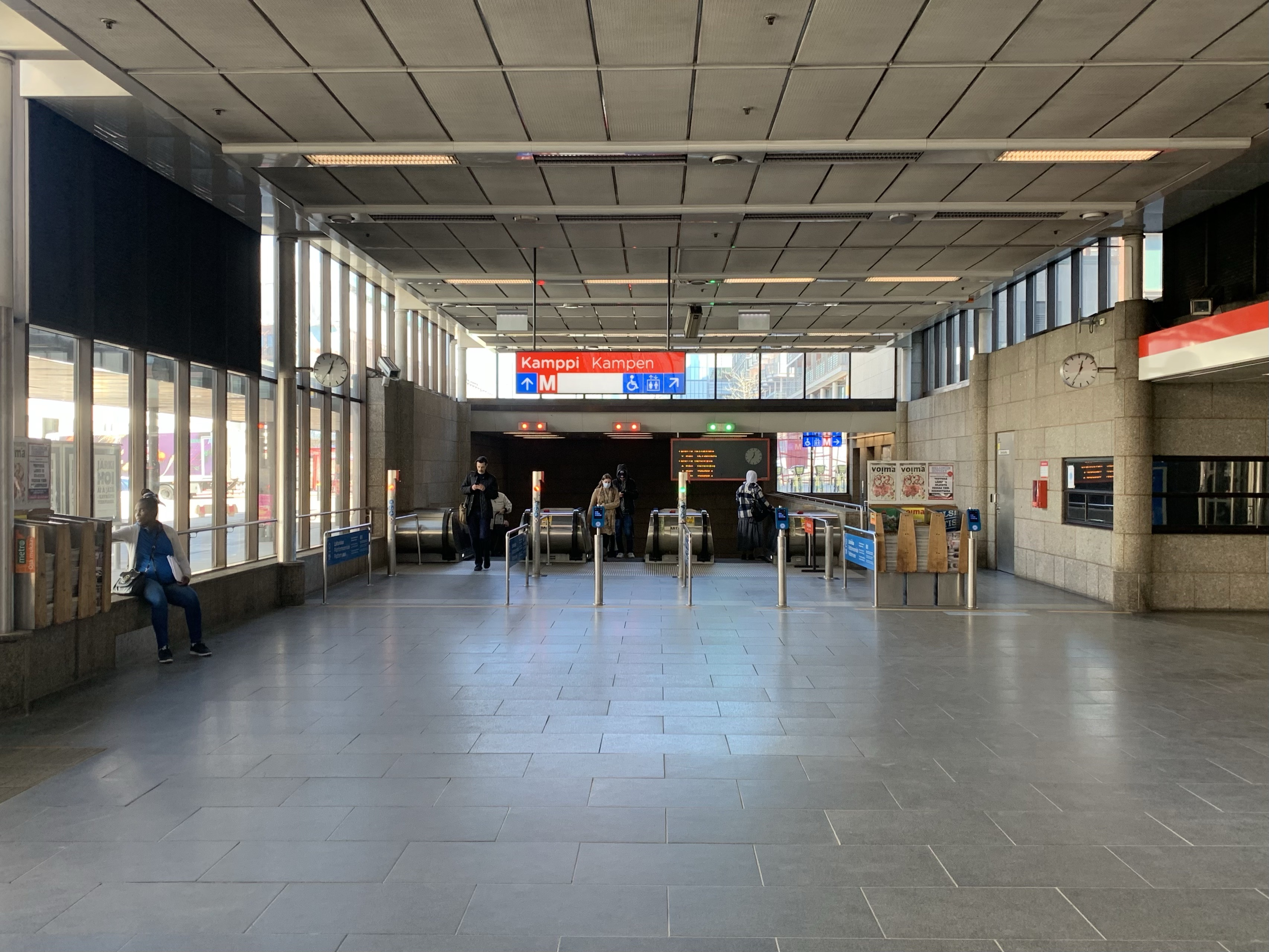
Original ticket hall, opened in 1983

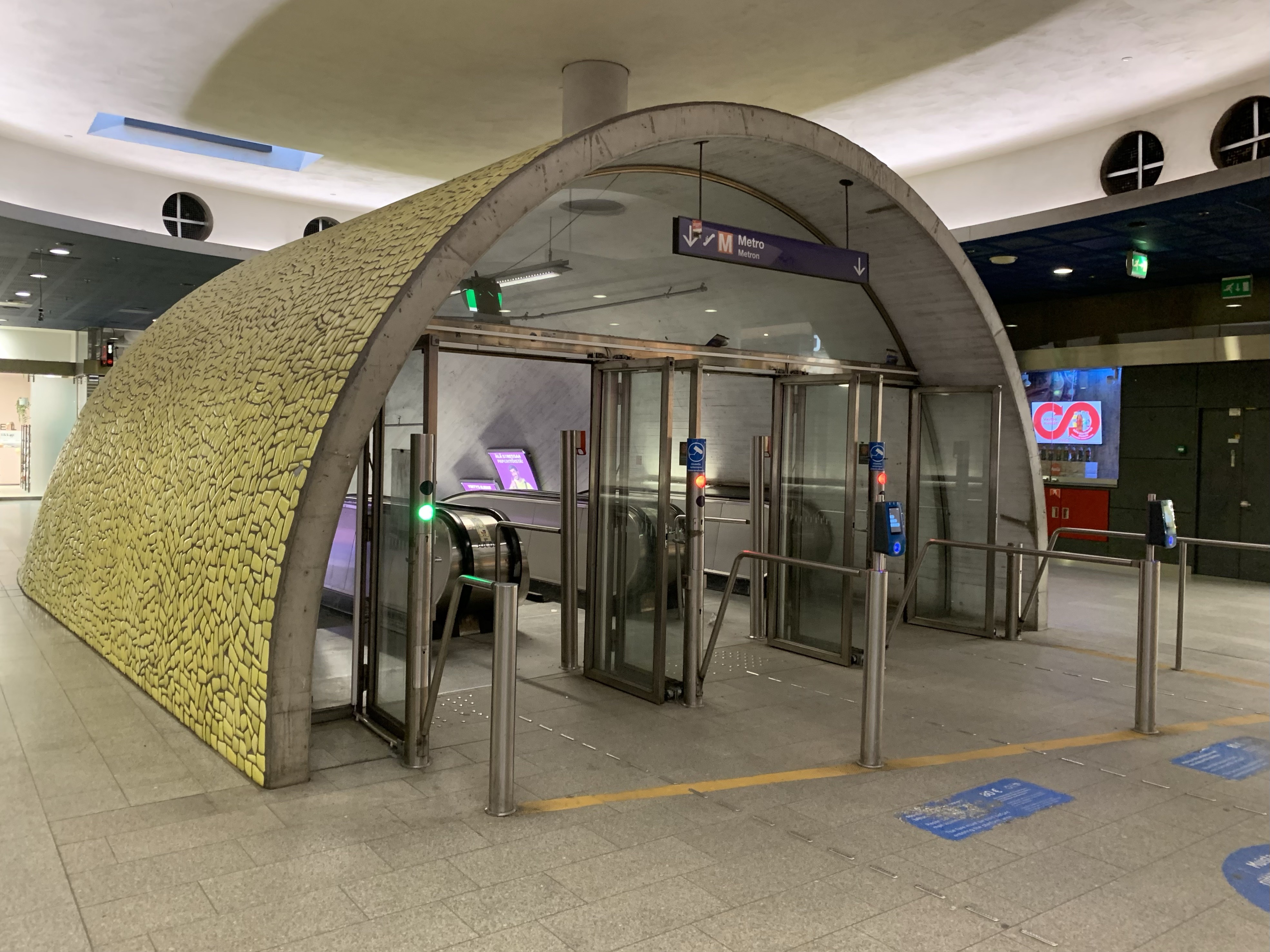
Entrance from the shopping centre, opened in 2005

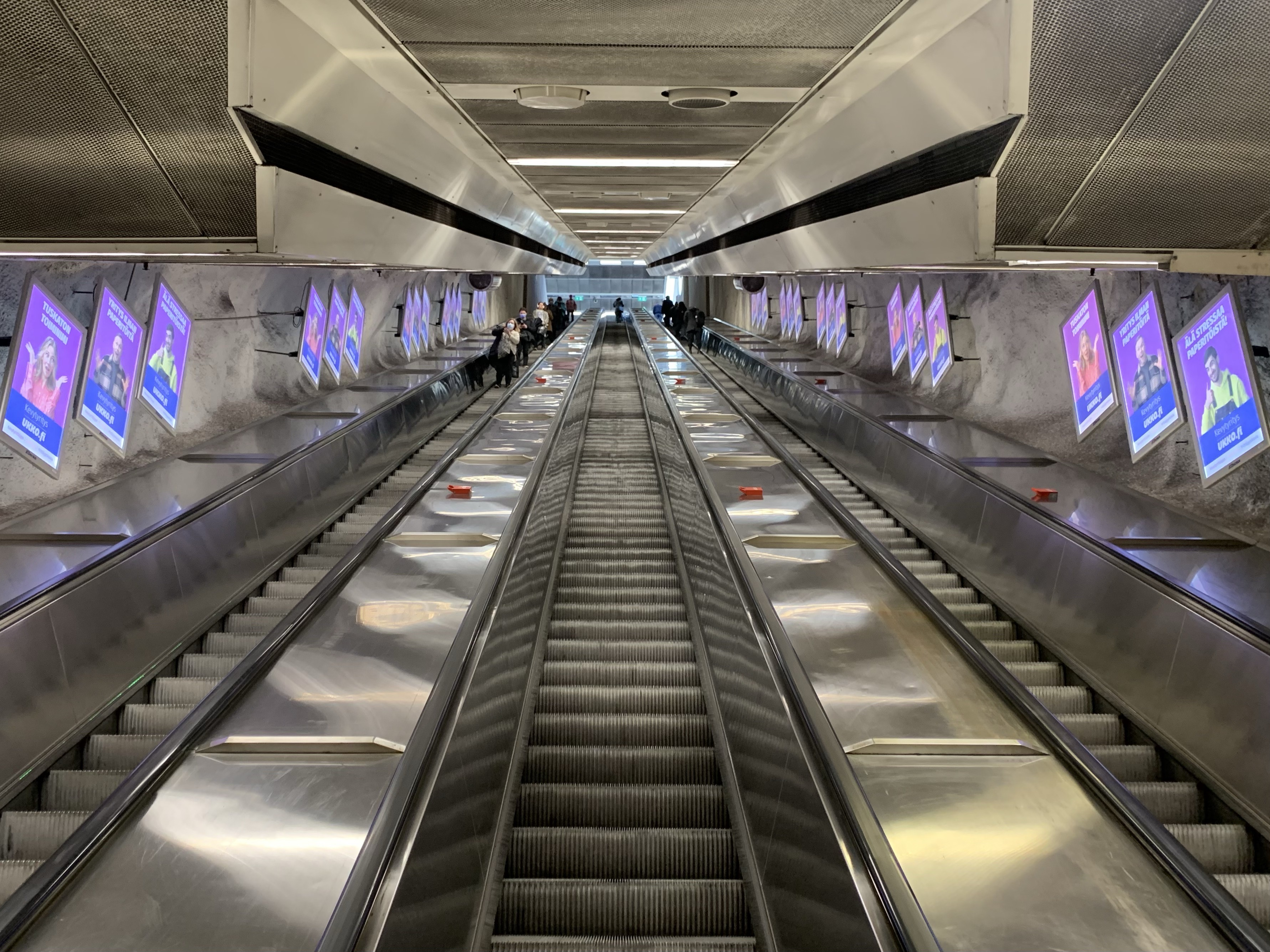
Old escalators to the ticket hall

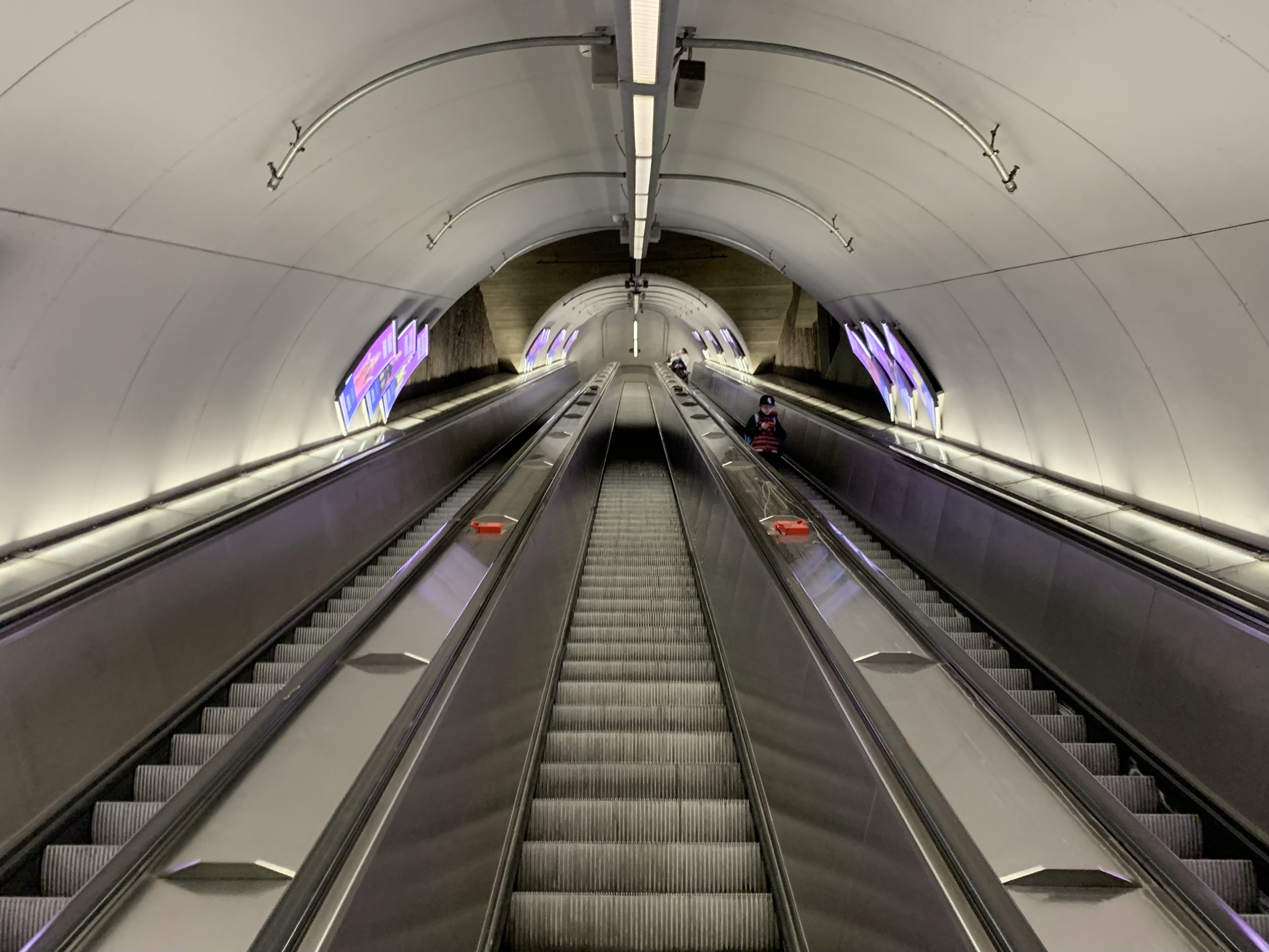
Newer escalators leading straight to the shopping centre
