= University of Helsinki metro station =

Helsinki Metro station

Helsingin yliopisto Helsingfors universitet University of Helsinki
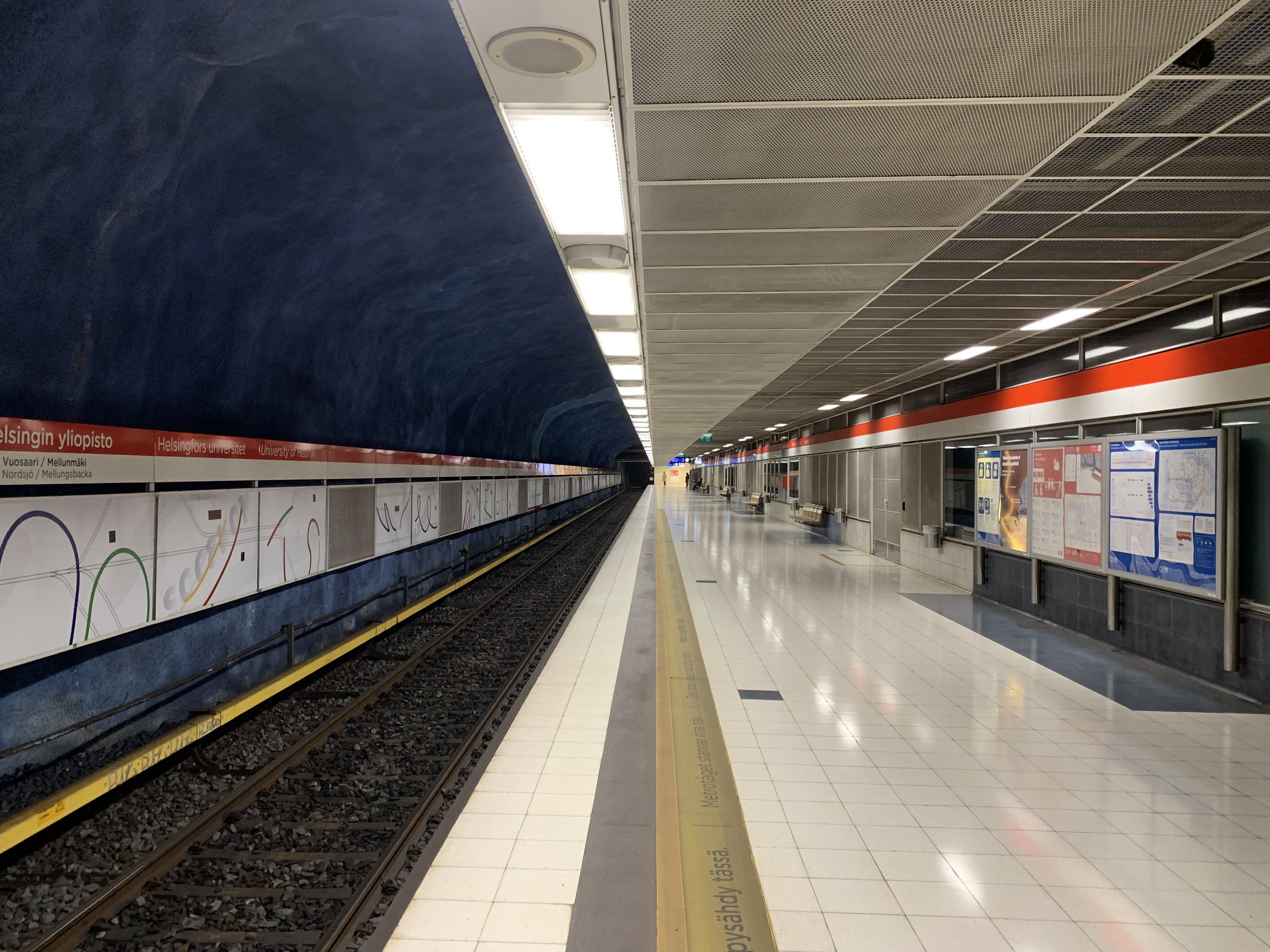

General information
- Location: Vuorikatu 12, Helsinki
- Coordinates: 60°10′20″N 24°56′51″E
- System: Helsinki Metro station
- Owner: HKL
- Platforms: island platform
- Tracks: 2
- Connections: Helsinki tram lines 3 6 and 9

Construction
- Structure type: Underground
- Depth: 27 m (89 ft)
- Accessible: Yes

Other information
- Fare zone: A

History
- Opened: 1 March 1995
- Former names: Kaisaniemi (1995–2015)

Passengers
- 24,000 daily

Services
Preceding station	Helsinki Metro	Following station
Rautatientori towards Kivenlahti	M1	Hakaniemi towards Vuosaari
Rautatientori towards Tapiola	M2	Hakaniemi towards Mellunmäki
Location

The University of Helsinki metro station (Finnish: Helsingin yliopiston metroasema, Swedish: Helsingfors universitets metrostation) is a station on the Helsinki Metro. It serves the University of Helsinki and surrounding areas in the central Helsinki districts Kaisaniemi and Kluuvi. From 1995 to 2015, the station's name was Kaisaniemi. The station is 27 metres below ground level and 22 metres below sea level. It is positioned 600 metres east of the Central Railway Station and 900 metres south of Hakaniemi. Both lines M1 and M2 serve the station.

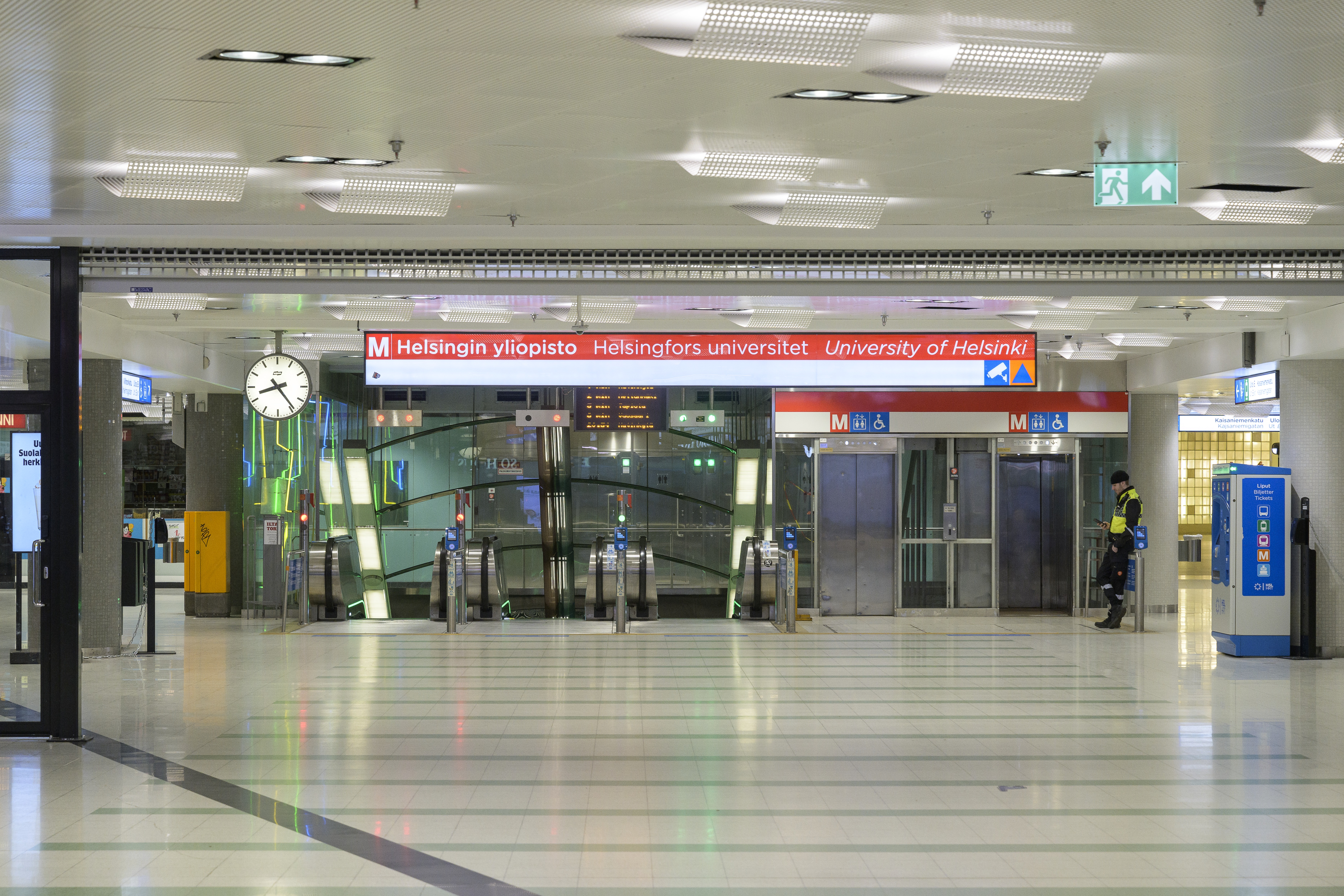
The station's ticket hall

== History ==
The location of the metro station was decided in 1971, and the station box was excavated during the metro's original construction work in the late 1970s. The station's opening date was postponed due to a lack of funds. The station was eventually opened on 1 March 1995, having been designed by the architect firm Kontio - Kilpi - Valjento Oy. The station is equipped with a glass-sided funicular-style elevator, operating along the slope parallel to the escalators.

== Renaming ==
In April 2014, the city council voted to rename the station from Kaisaniemi to University of Helsinki. The rebranding was completed in January 2015 to commemorate the university's 375th anniversary. This metro station is one of two comprising the system to be named after a university; the other one is Aalto University.
