= Hakaniemi metro station =

Helsinki Metro station

Hakaniemi Hagnäs
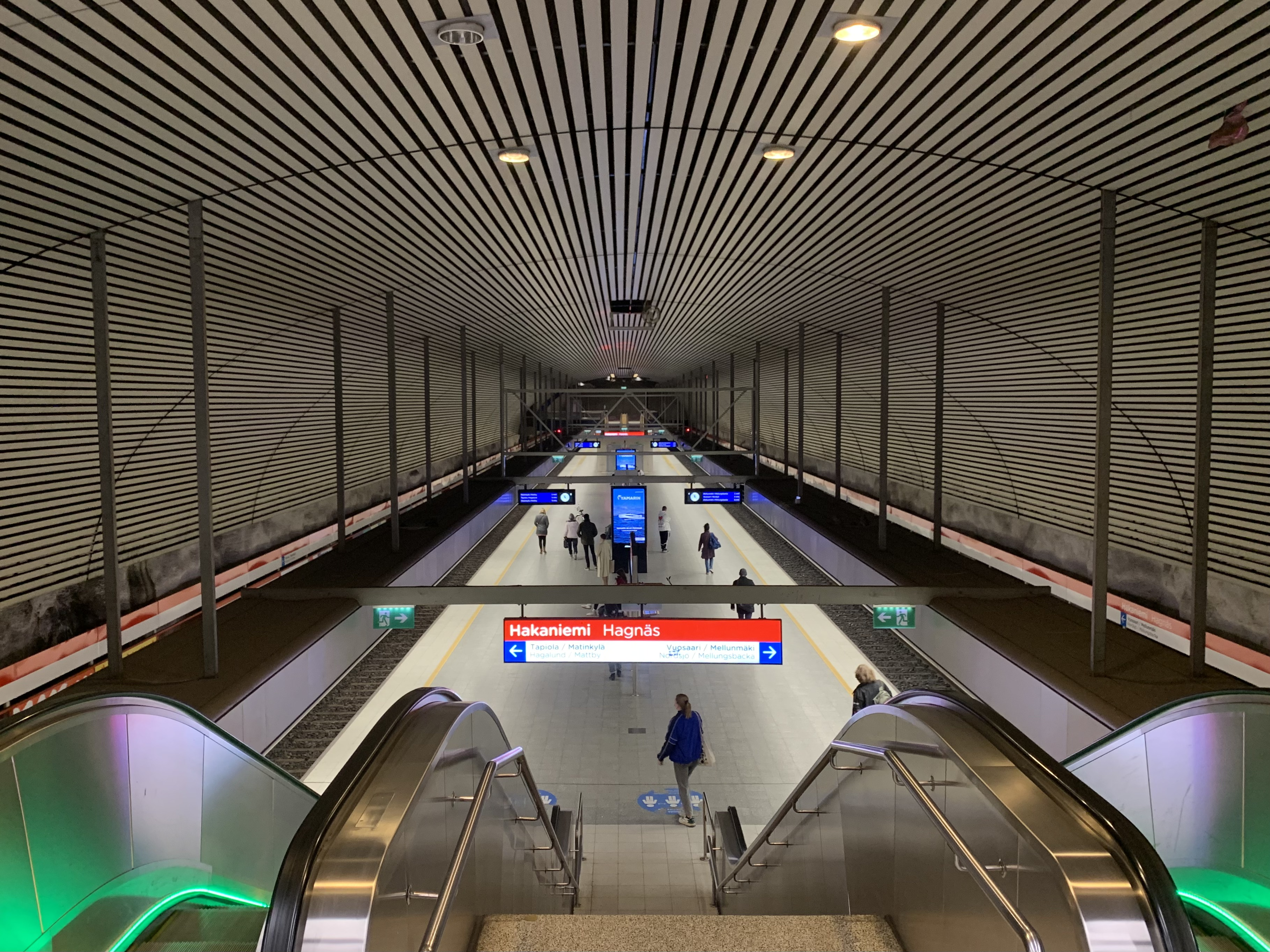

General information
- Location: Toinen linja 7, Helsinki; Siltasaarenkatu 7, Helsinki
- Coordinates: 60°10′48″N 24°57′2″E
- System: Helsinki Metro station
- Owner: HKL
- Platforms: 1 island platform
- Tracks: 2
- Connections: Helsinki tram lines 3 6 7 9 Helsinki buses

Construction
- Structure type: Underground
- Depth: 23 m (75 ft)
- Cycle facilities: 28 spaces
- Accessible: Yes

Other information
- Fare zone: A

History
- Opened: 1 June 1982

Passengers
- 28,100 daily

Services
Preceding station	Helsinki Metro	Following station
University of Helsinki towards Kivenlahti	M1	Sörnäinen towards Vuosaari
University of Helsinki towards Tapiola	M2	Sörnäinen towards Mellunmäki
Location

Hakaniemi metro station (Finnish: Hakaniemen metroasema, Swedish: Hagnäs metrostation) is a station on the Helsinki Metro. It serves the central Helsinki districts of Hakaniemi and Kallio. Both lines M1 and M2 serve Hakaniemi. There are 28 bicycle parking spaces at the station.

Opened on 1 June 1982, Hakaniemi was among the first metro stations opened in Helsinki. It was designed by Mirja Castrén, Juhani Jauhiainen, and Marja Nuuttila. It is located 900 meters from the University of Helsinki station, and 900 meters from Sörnäinen metro station. The station is situated at a depth of 23 meters below ground level and 21 meters below sea level.

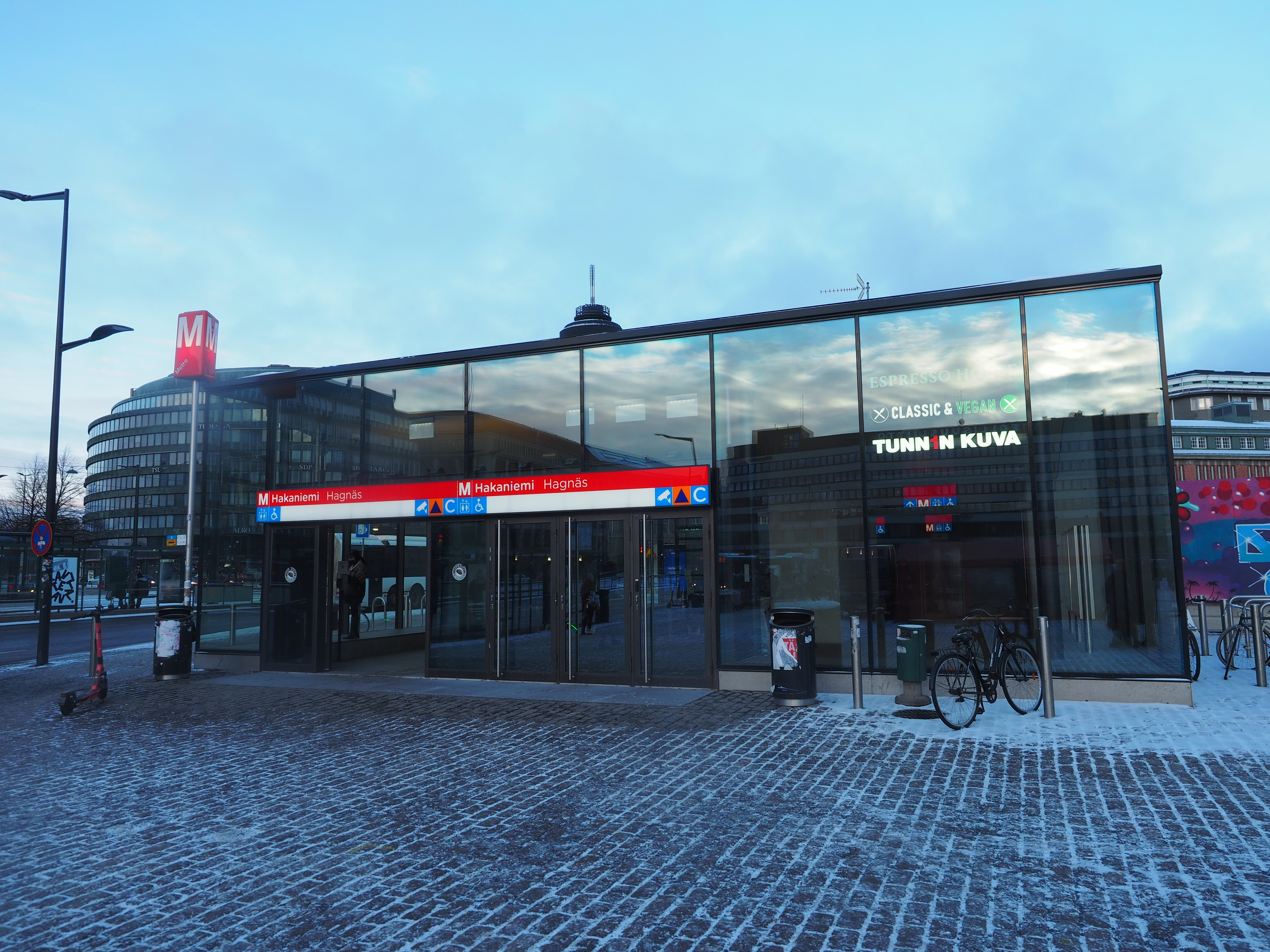
Entrance to the Hakaniemi station

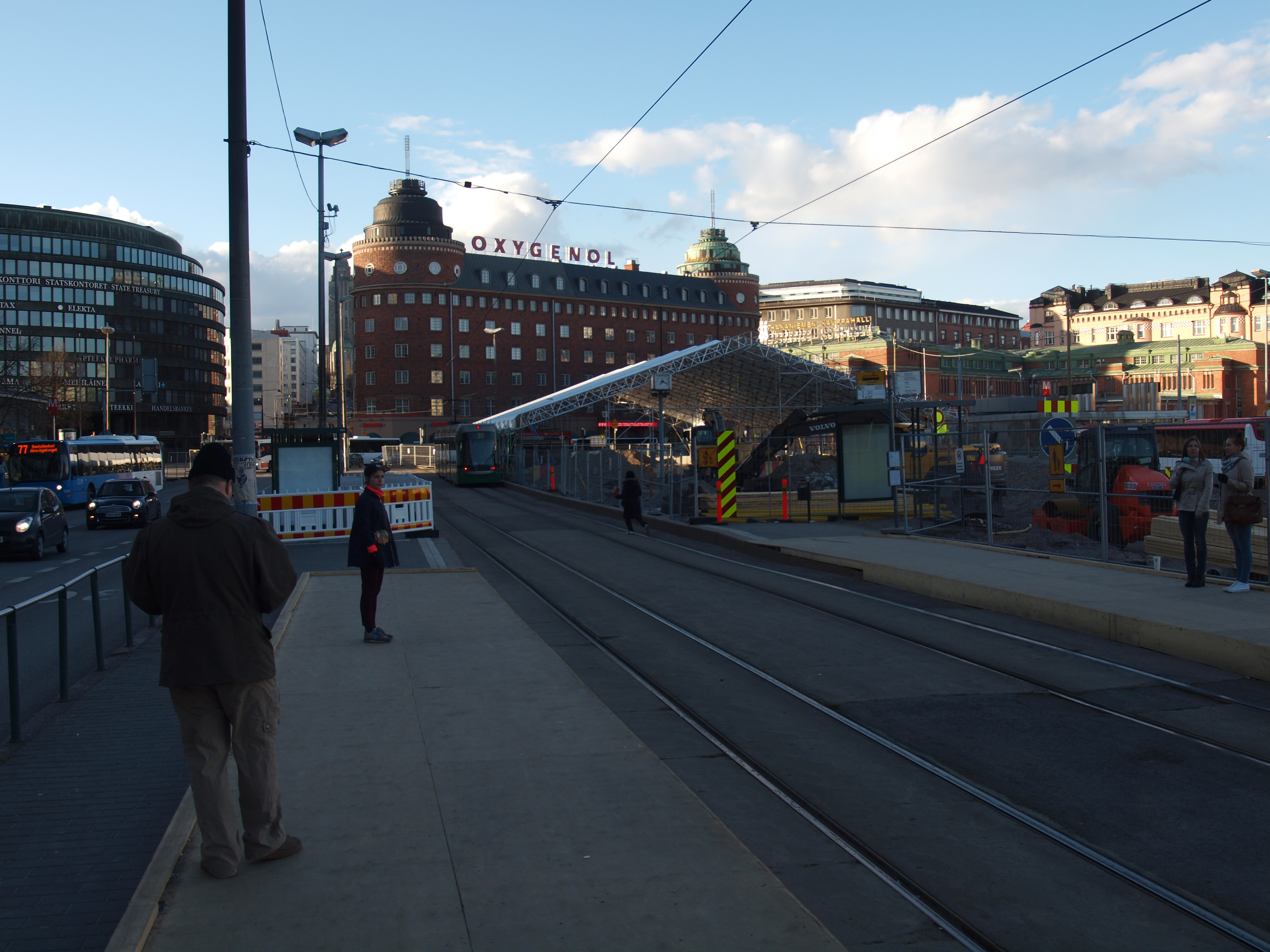
From April to June 2013, the main entrance to the Hakaniemi metro station is being renovated, cutting off all tram traffic on Hämeentie between Hakaniemi and Sörnäinen.

== In popular culture ==
The Hakaniemi metro station was seen in Aki Kaurismäki's film Calamari Union. Hakaniemi metro station was also featured in Bomfunk MC's music video for the hit single "Freestyler".
