= Espoo =

City in Uusimaa, Finland

Espoo Espoo Esbo
- City
- City of Espoo; Espoon kaupunki Esbo stad
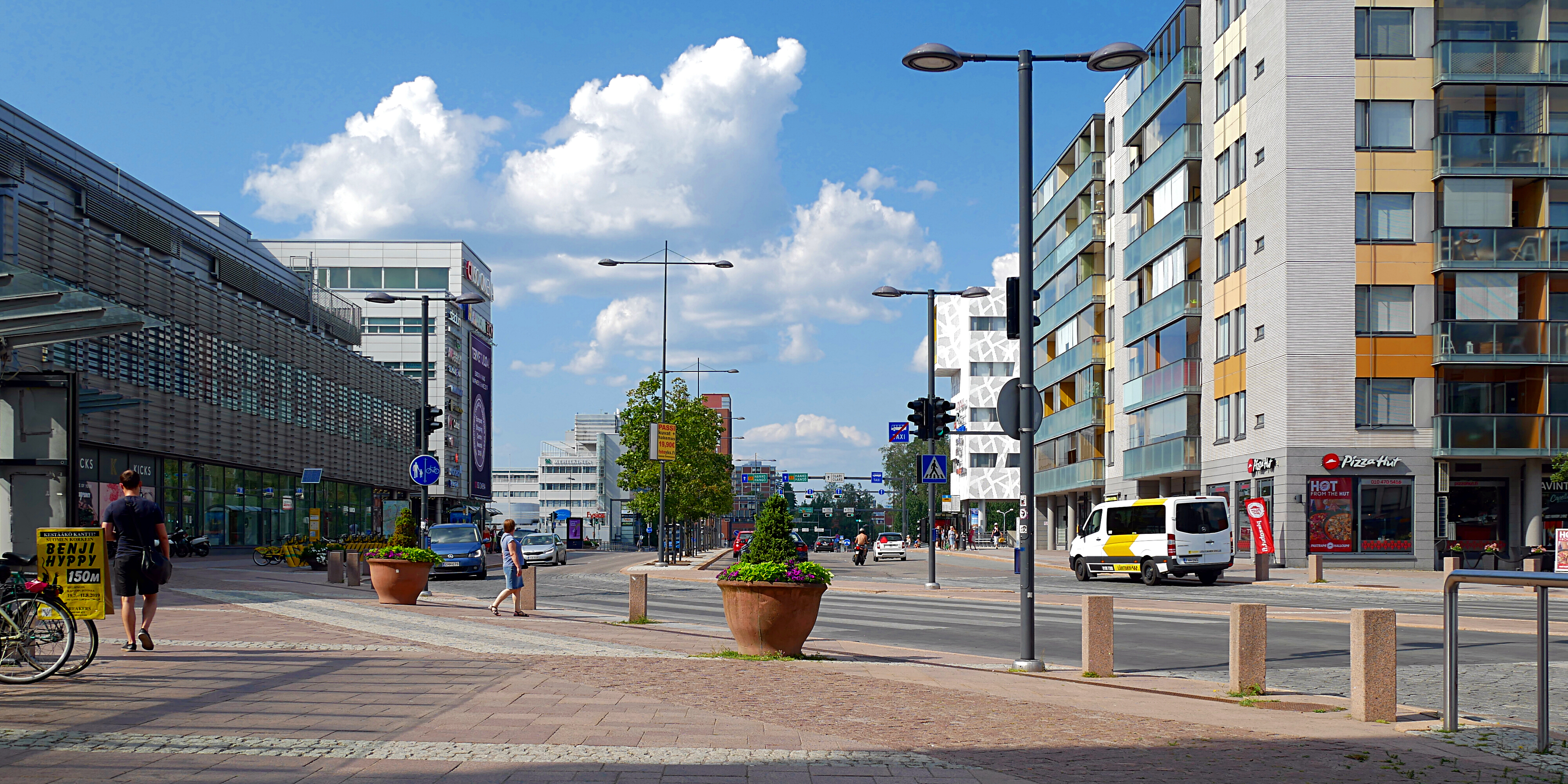
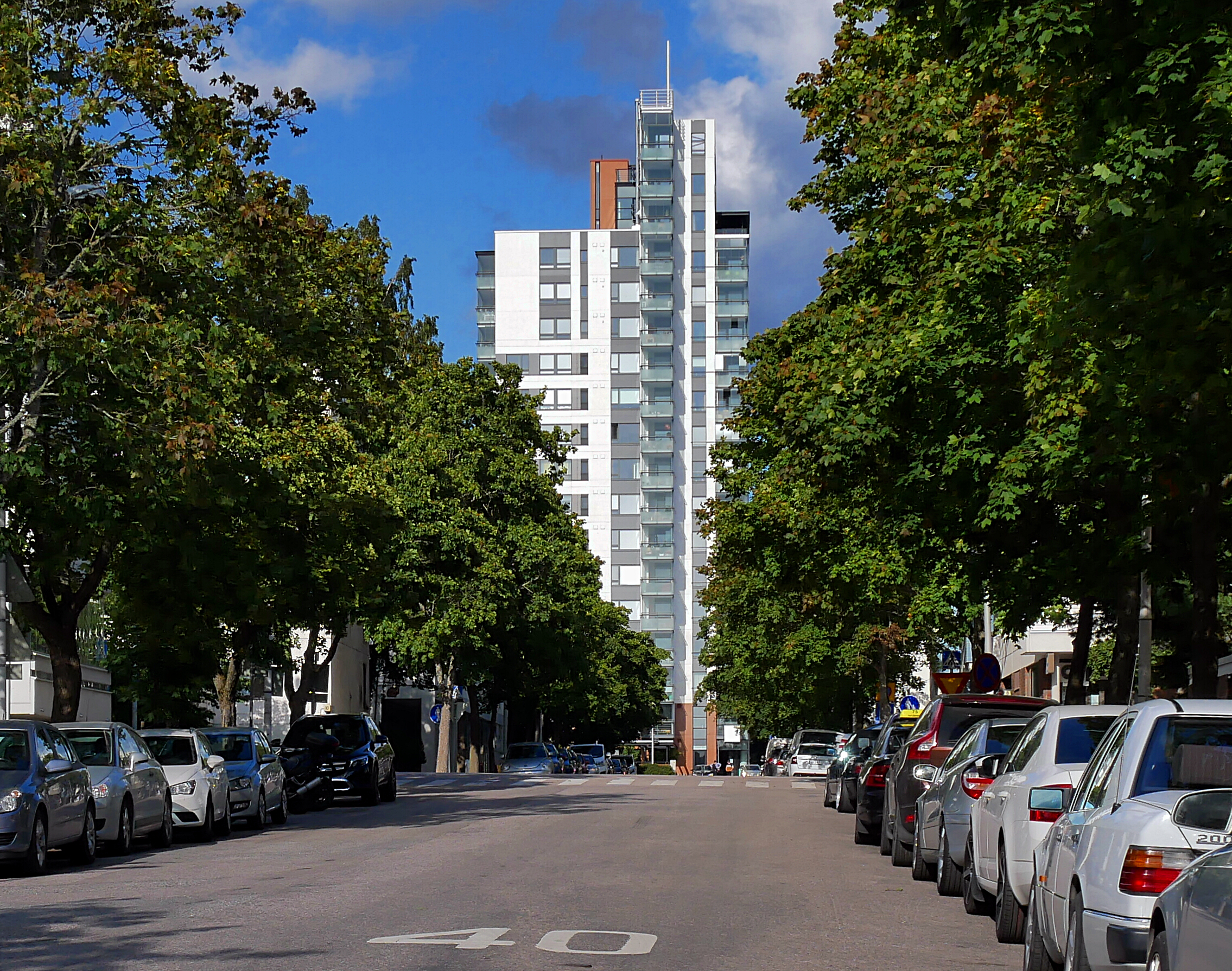
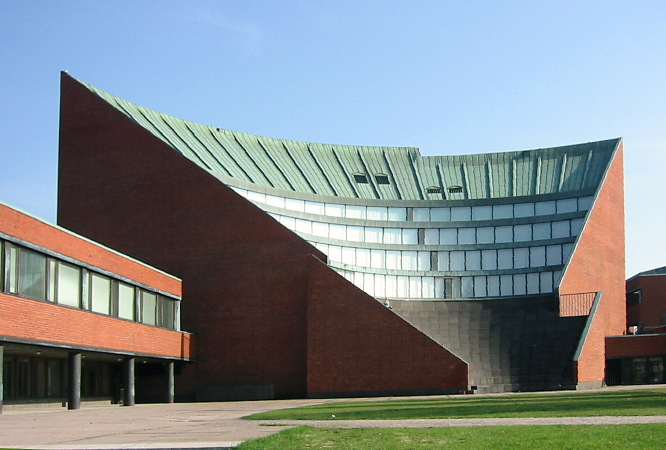
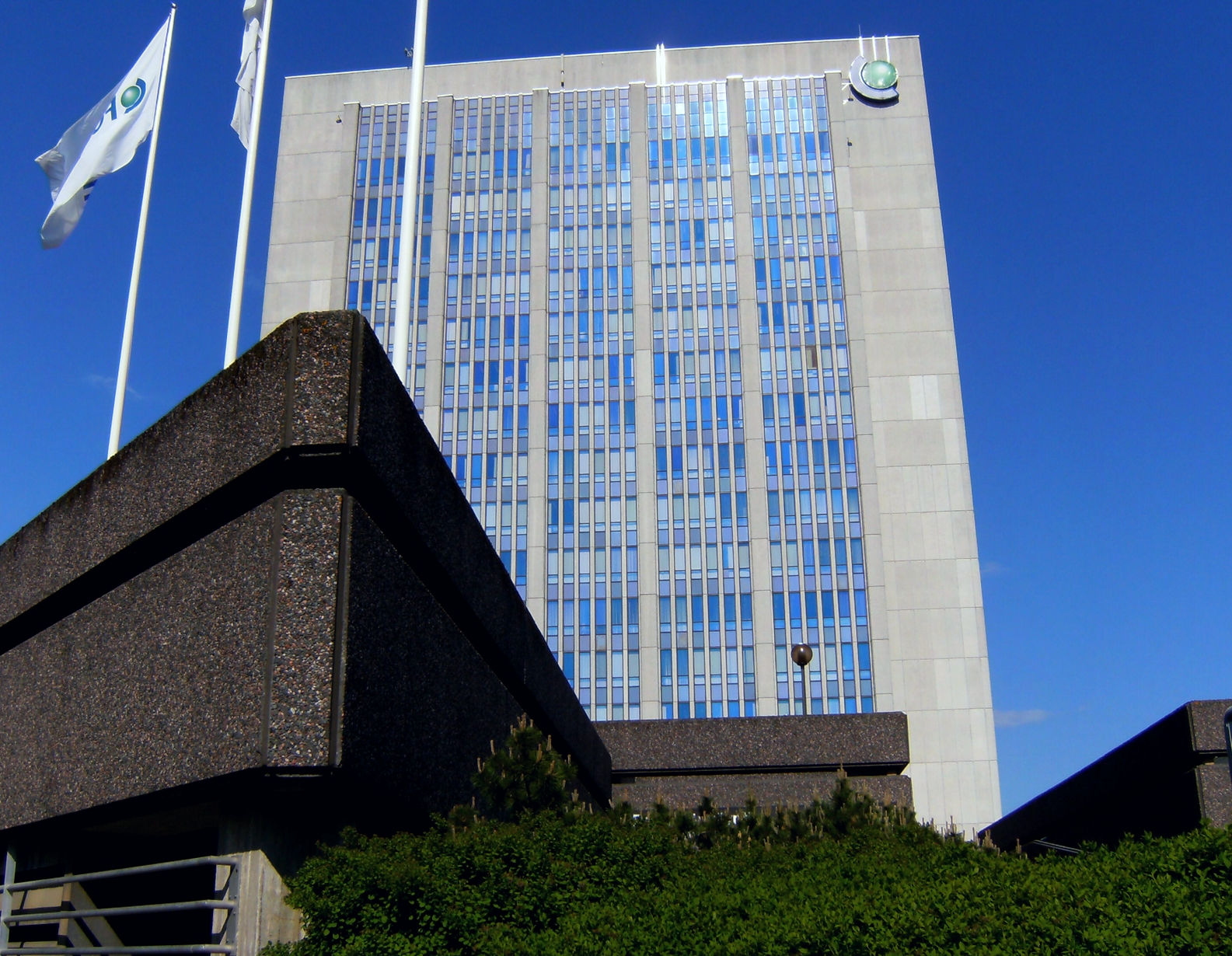
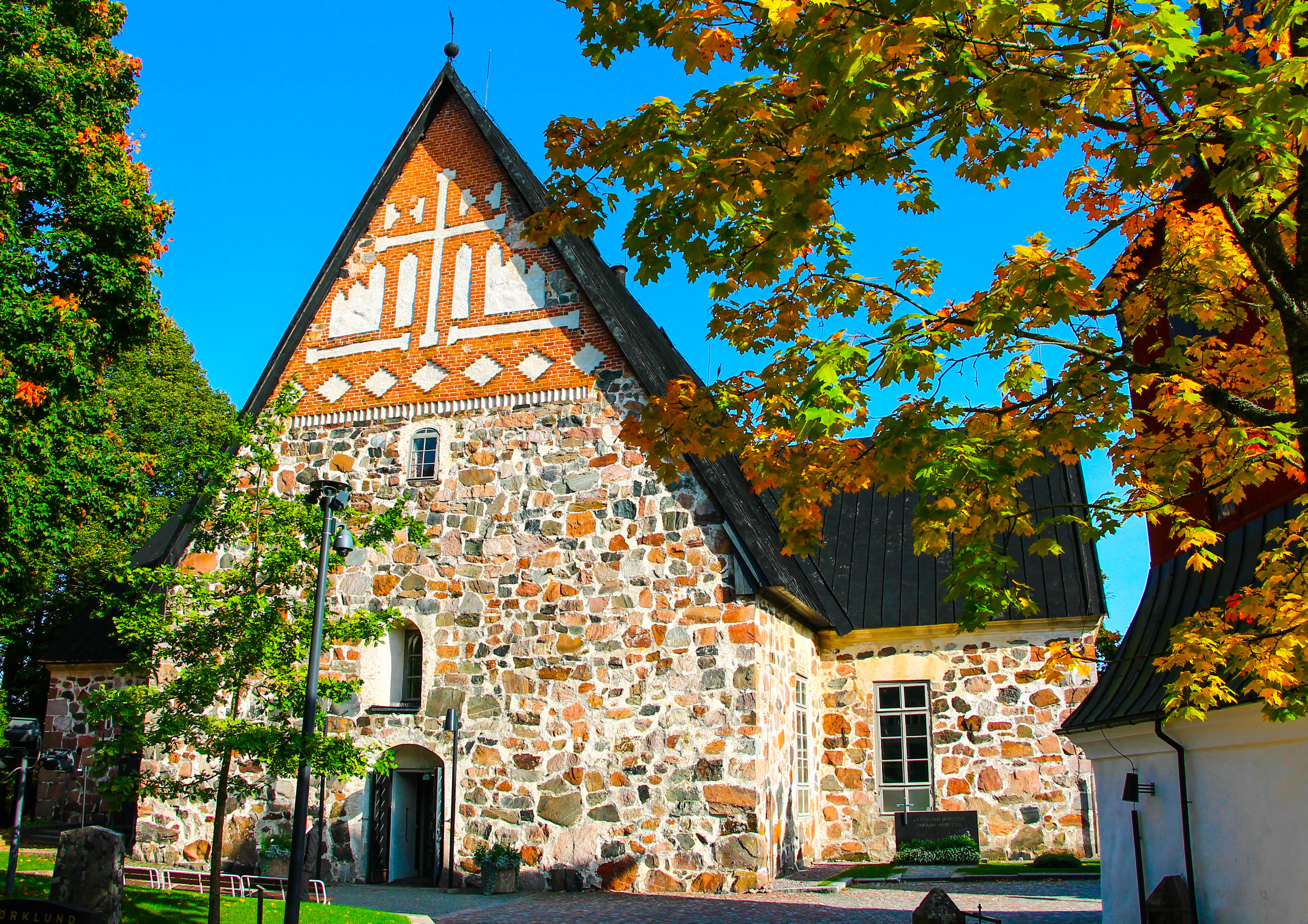
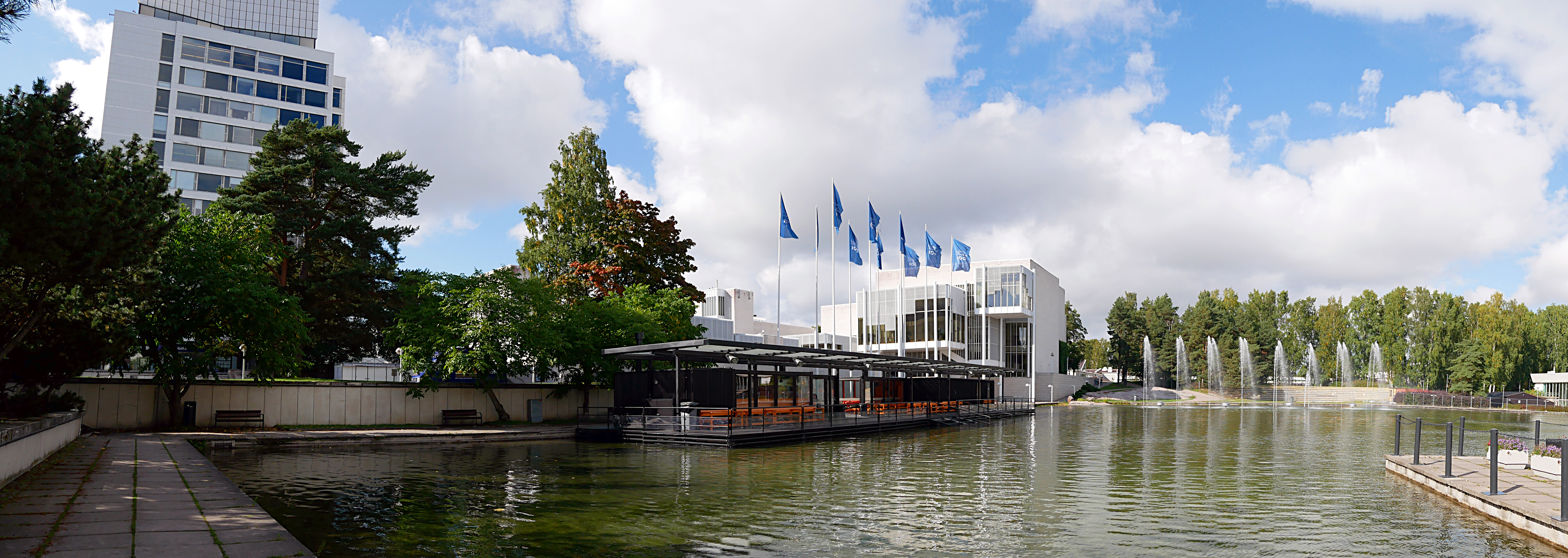
- From top, left to right: Downtown Matinkylä; street in Espoonlahti; Aalto University Auditorium; Finago Tower; Espoo Cathedral; Tapiola with Espoo Cultural Centre

- Coat of arms

- Location within Finland
- Interactive map of Espoo
- Coordinates: 60°12′20″N 024°39′20″E
- Country: Finland
- Region: Uusimaa
- Sub-region: Helsinki sub-region
- Metropolitan area: Helsinki metropolitan area
- Founded (parish): 1458 (Note: According to tradition, a priest named Henricus was inaugurated as the first vicar of Espoo in 1458. Although the historicity of Henricus is somewhat uncertain, the date is celebrated as the founding of the city.)
- Market town: 1963
- Incorporated (city): 1 January 1972

Government
  - City manager: Kai Mykkänen

Area (2018-01-01)
  - Total: 528.03 km^{2} (203.87 sq mi)
  - Land: 312.35 km^{2} (120.60 sq mi)
  - Water: 215.88 km^{2} (83.35 sq mi)
  - Rank: 230th largest in Finland

Population (2025-12-31)
  - Total: 325,716
  - Rank: 2nd largest in Finland
  - Density: 1,042.79/km^{2} (2,700.8/sq mi)

Population by native language
  - Finnish: 68% (official)
  - Swedish: 6.2% (official)
  - Others: 25.9%

Population by age
  - 0 to 14: 18.7%
  - 15 to 64: 66.2%
  - 65 or older: 15%
- Time zone: UTC+02:00 (EET)
  - Summer (DST): UTC+03:00 (EEST)
- Climate: Dfb
- Website: www.espoo.fi/en

Espoo (/ˈɛspoʊ/; Finnish: [ˈespoː]; Swedish: Esbo (Note: Finland Swedish: [ˈesːbo])) is a city in Finland. It is located to the west of the capital, Helsinki, in southern Uusimaa. The population is approximately 326,000. It is the 2nd most populous municipality in Finland. Espoo is part of the Helsinki Metropolitan Area, which has approximately 1.6 million inhabitants. Espoo is on the northern shore of the Gulf of Finland and borders Helsinki, Vantaa, Kirkkonummi, Vihti and Nurmijärvi. The city includes the enclave of Kauniainen. Espoo covers an area of 528 km^{2} (204 sq mi). Espoo is a bilingual municipality with Finnish and Swedish as its official languages. The population consists of 68% Finnish speakers, 6% Swedish speakers, and 26% speakers of other languages, well above the national average.

Espoo was settled in the Prehistoric Era, with evidence of human settlements dating back 8,000 years. However, the population disappeared during the early Iron Age. During the Early Middle Ages, the region was populated by Tavastians and Southwestern Finns. Following the Northern Crusades, Swedish settlers began to emigrate to the coastal regions of modern-day Finland. Espoo was founded as an autonomous Catholic parish in the 15th century. Following the conclusion of the Finnish War, the decision to make Helsinki the new capital of the Russian-controlled Grand Duchy of Finland in 1812 had a significant positive impact on the municipality's growth and development. Nevertheless, the territory continued to be mainly agrarian until the 20th century. After World War II, Espoo underwent swift urbanization and significant demographic shifts, with Finnish becoming the majority language around 1950, replacing Swedish. The municipality attained market town status in 1963 and was granted city status in 1972.

The city is characterized by a suburban landscape dominated by detached housing. It is recognized for its expansive natural surroundings such as a 58 km (36 mi) shoreline, an archipelago, forests, lakes, and a national park. Espoo is divided into seven major districts, with each being further divided into smaller districts and neighbourhoods. Unlike traditional cities, Espoo does not have a central city area; instead, it has five distinct city centres: Leppävaara, Tapiola, Matinkylä, Espoon keskus and Espoonlahti. Espoo has numerous local centres formed around historical manors. Because of its structure, Espoo is generally considered even "the most American suburban city of Finland".

Aalto University is situated in Otaniemi, Espoo, alongside a thriving scientific community that comprises startups and associations such as VTT – the Technical Research Centre of Finland. Espoo is home to leading enterprises like Nokia, HMD Global, Tieto, KONE, Neste, Fortum, Orion Corporation, Metso, and Foreca, in addition to game developers Rovio and Remedy Entertainment. In 2015, Espoo became a member of the UNESCO Global Network of Learning Cities.

== History ==
=== Etymology ===
Before the time of the Swedish colonisation, Espoo was inhabited by Tavastians, a Finnish tribe, and the area in which the city lies on did most likely have a different name. The name of Espoo is believed to have derived from the Medieval Swedish village of Espaby (or Espoby), which was located in the western part of the present-day city. It may refer to aspens that grew on a nearby riverbank, as the archaic Swedish word for the tree is "äspe", and the word for a river is "å", with the suffix "-by" meaning village.

The coat of arms of Espoo features a gold horseshoe topped by a gold crown on a blue shield. The crown refers to the old kungsgård of Espoo and the horseshoe refers to the obligation to transport officials, military or prisoners that parishes along the King's Road fell under. Many roads in Espoo still follow the old medieval King's Road. The King's Road in Finland, stretching from Turku in the west to Vyborg in the east, was formed in the 1340s or 1350s and was the most important road in Finland at the time.

=== Prehistory ===
Present-day Espoo was first settled by hunter-gatherers around 8,000 years ago, a few thousand years after the end of the Last Glacial Period. Stone Age settlements have been found from Nuuksio and Perinki. Settlements from the Early Metal Age have been found from Mikkelä and from Morby dating from the Pre-Roman Iron Age, of which the latter is an important subject relating to research of cattle husbandry. Traces of early settlement in the area remain in the place names. For example, the original name for Soukka was Soukko.

The first settlers lived in the northern parts of the current city, around the lakes Pitkäjärvi, Bodomjärvi, and Loojärvi, as the southern parts were still largely covered by the sea. In the Stone Age, people in Espoo lived on south-facing shores and slopes, which provided shelter from cold continental winds. Living close to water bodies also made hunting and fishing easier. The way of life was dictated by seasonal changes, and people rarely stayed in one place throughout the year.

During the Bronze Age (c. 1500–500 BCE), human settlement shifted southward. Known settlements from the era are few, but more than 70 cairn-like burial sites from the period have been discovered, mostly from southern Espoo, which formed an archipelago at the time. When ironwork was introduced to Finland around 500 BCE, it gave people access to materials that were far more versatile than materials used before. However, the climate grew colder at the beginning of the Iron Age, and it seems that human settlement in Espoo disappeared during the era. Only two discoveries from the time have been made in Espoo.

=== Swedish rule ===
==== Medieval Espoo ====
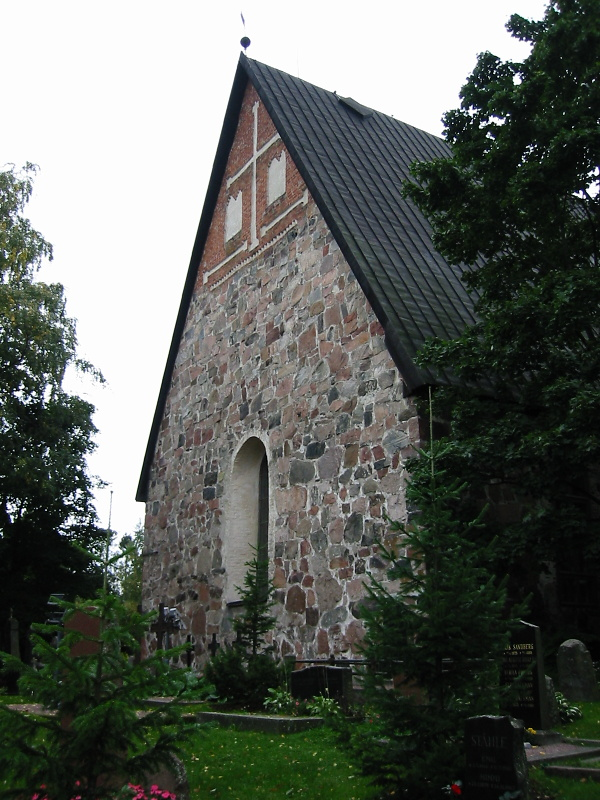
Evangelical Lutheran Cathedral in Espoo, originally built as a Catholic parish church in the 1480s

Most of the original villages of present-day Espoo were founded by Tavastian Finns according to place names. By the 12th century, there were Tavastian houses on the shore of Kaukjärvi (now known as Pitkäjärvi), in Kauklahti, Karvasmäki, Bemböle, Haapalahti and Finnevik.

The first Swedish settlements in Uusimaa were established during the 12th or 13th century. Swedish settlers moved to the area through the current site of Kirkkonummi, and then to the Esboby area. From there, they continued northeast to Kauklahti, Bemböle and Vanhakartano. In later stages, settlers might also have arrived in Espoo directly from Sweden, most likely from Svealand. The Swedish name for Espoo, Esbo, dates from this period. The settlers changed the Finnish names used by the Tavastians to Swedish ones: for example Kauklahti became Köklax and Karvasmäki became Karvasbacka. The current Finnish names might also have changed from the original ones in this process. For example, the place name Välli might have been changed into Vällskog, which has since led to the current Finnish name Velskola. The Swedish settlements were so extensive that the entire area became Swedish-speaking, except for its northernmost part and possibly the Haapalahti-Mäkkylä area.

Palynological analyses indicate that agriculture was already practised in Espoo around the 11th century, but no historical records from the era survive. Until the late 13th century, Espoo was part of a borderland region between the Southwestern Finns and Tavastian Finns. Some artefacts found in Espoo have also been traced to ancient Savo-Karelian Finnish costumes, and the Late Iron Age and Early Medieval women in the area have had similar jewellery as in the region around present-day Mikkeli.

In the Middle Ages, there were about 70 village lots in Espoo. Ancient fields and many passageways have been discovered near the remains of ancient villages. Espaby (at which site the Espoo manor was later founded) was probably the oldest Swedish-speaking village in the area. The name Espoo likely refers to the name of the river Espoonjoki (Swedish: Esboån, originally Espå / Espåå), which in turn is thought to have come from the aspen trees on the shores of the river (the Swedish word for "aspen" is äspe). The name was first mentioned in 1431. Originally, the current river Gumbölenjoki was renamed Espoonjoki after the village located along the river. When a church was founded near the village of Södrik, the name Espoonjoki was given to a river running from lake Kirkkojärvi to Kauklahti.

Espoo became an independent parish in the 15th century. Previously Espoo had been a chapel parish under Kirkkonummi. The stone Espoo Cathedral was built in the 1480s by initiative from the peasants. Up to the 1670s the eastern parts of Espoo belonged to the Helsinki parish, after which they were officially annexed to the Espoo parish and the slottslän of Raseborg.

After the Second Crusade to Finland, settlers from Sweden established permanent agricultural settlements in Uusimaa. Espoo was a subdivision of the Kirkkonummi congregation until 1486–1487. The oldest known document referring to Kirkkonummi is from 1330; Espoo as a subchapter has been dated to the 1380s, although the first document directly referring to Espoo is from as late as 1431. The construction of the Espoo Cathedral, the oldest preserved building in Espoo, marks the independence of Espoo. Administratively, Espoo was a part of Uusimaa. When the province was split to Eastern and Western provinces governed from the Porvoo and Raseborg castles, respectively, the eastern border of the Raseborg province was in Espoo. The 13th-century road connecting the most important cities in Finland at that time, the King's Road, passes through Espoo on its way from Stockholm via Turku and Porvoo to Viipuri.

==== Gräsa manor ====
The oldest frälse stead in Espoo, the Gräsa manor, apparently received frälse rights in the late 15th century. Gräsa is one of the oldest settlements in Espoo and the oldest in southern Espoo, as it was probably founded already in the early 14th century as Swedish settlement moved inland. From the beginning, the settlement was located at the site of the current Olari Church on both sides of the Gräsanoja river. The absence of Finnish names in the area reveals that the population was Swedish-speaking from the beginning.

==== Early modern period ====
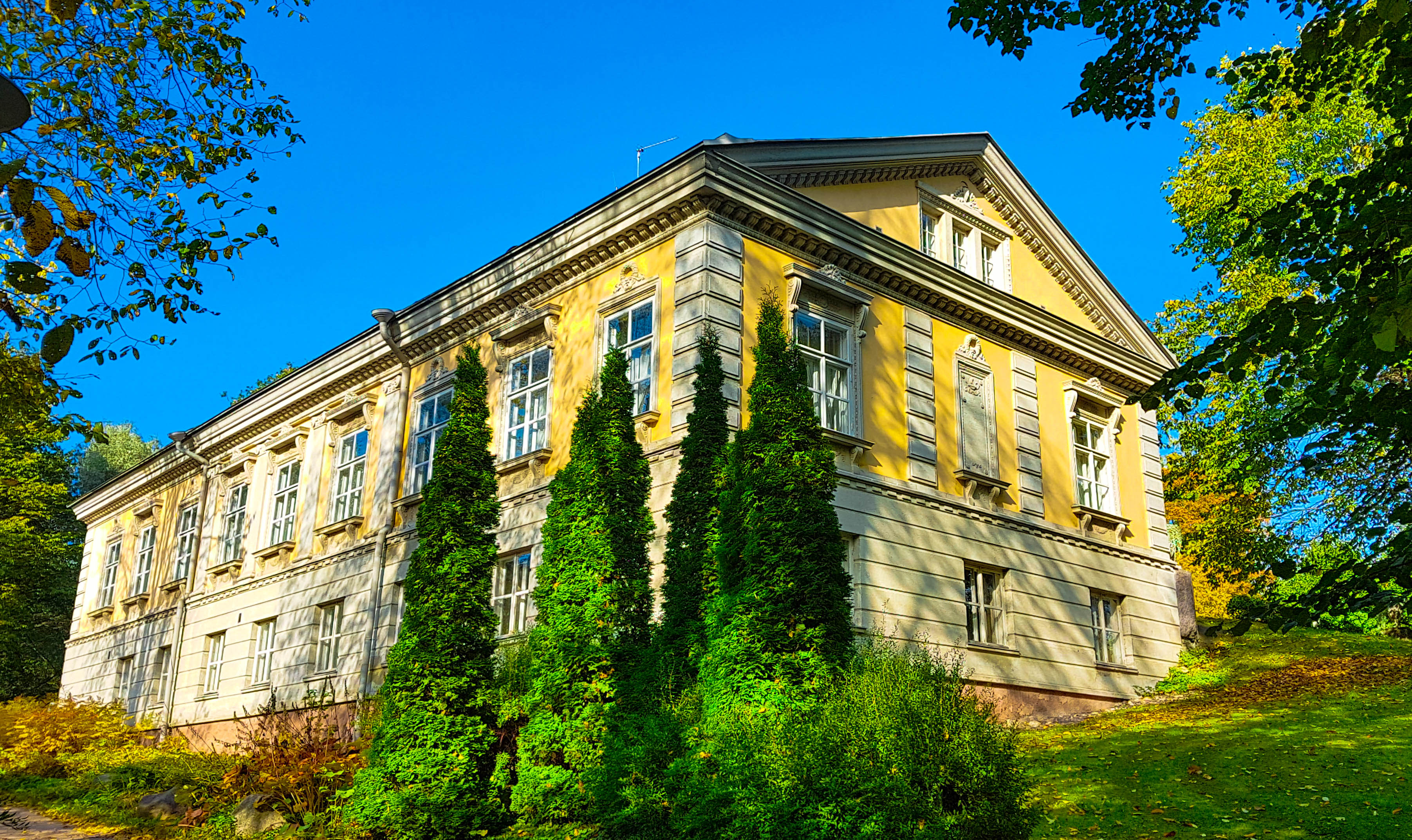
The Royal Manor in Espoo, founded by King Gustav I of Sweden in 1556. The current mansion was completed in 1797 and expanded in 1914.

In 1556, King Gustav Vasa decided to stabilize and develop the region by founding a royal mansion in Espoo. The government bought the villages of Espåby and Mankby (Finnish: Mankki) and transferred the population elsewhere, and built the royal mansion in Espåby. (Mankby was eventually abandoned and was never repopulated.) The royal mansion housed the king's local plenipotentiary (vogt), and collected royal tax in kind paid by labour on the mansion's farm. The administrative centre Espoon keskus has grown around the church and the Espoo railway station, but the municipality has retained a network-like structure to the modern day.

In the 16th century Espoo changed into a parish of many large farmsteads. The war between Sweden and Russia in the late 16th century attracted farmstead owners to found horse steads in hopes of reduced taxation. Horse stead owners were required to uphold a rider in the wars fought by the realm. In the late 17th century the crown had donated lands to noblemen with success in wars, and during a few decades, the lands in Espoo had been dealt to seven noble families.

In the early 18th century the Great Northern War and the Great Wrath caused poverty among the people. During this time, many members of the estates in Espoo moved to Sweden. The foundation of Sveaborg in front of Helsinki increased the traffic in Espoo and many officers bought villas in Espoo. Construction of the fortress required transport of bricks from factories in Espoo. In the same century, agricultural novelties such as the potato and various fruits spread from the manor houses to the peasants.

=== Grand Duchy of Finland and early industrialisation ===
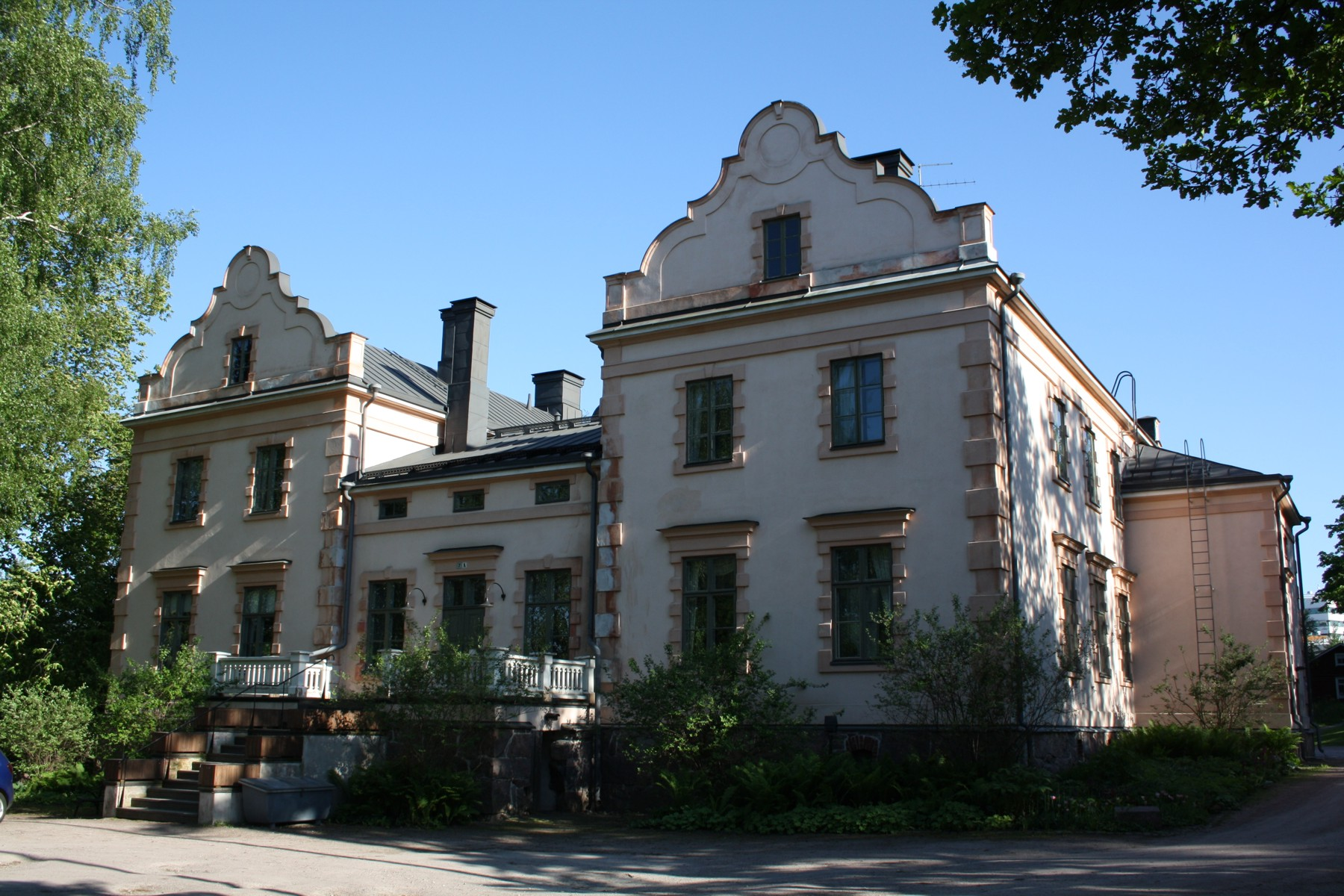
The Neo-Renaissance Alberga Manor in Leppävaara, built by the Russian industrialist Feodor Kiseleff in the 1870s

Swedish rule in Finland came to an end in 1809, when the Kingdom of Sweden ceded all of its remaining territory in Finland under control of the Russian Empire after the Finnish War. When the city of Helsinki became the capital of the newly established Grand Duchy of Finland in 1812, it brought novel developments to the neighbouring parish of Espoo. Many government officials as well as members of the growing merchant class bought summer houses from Espoo.

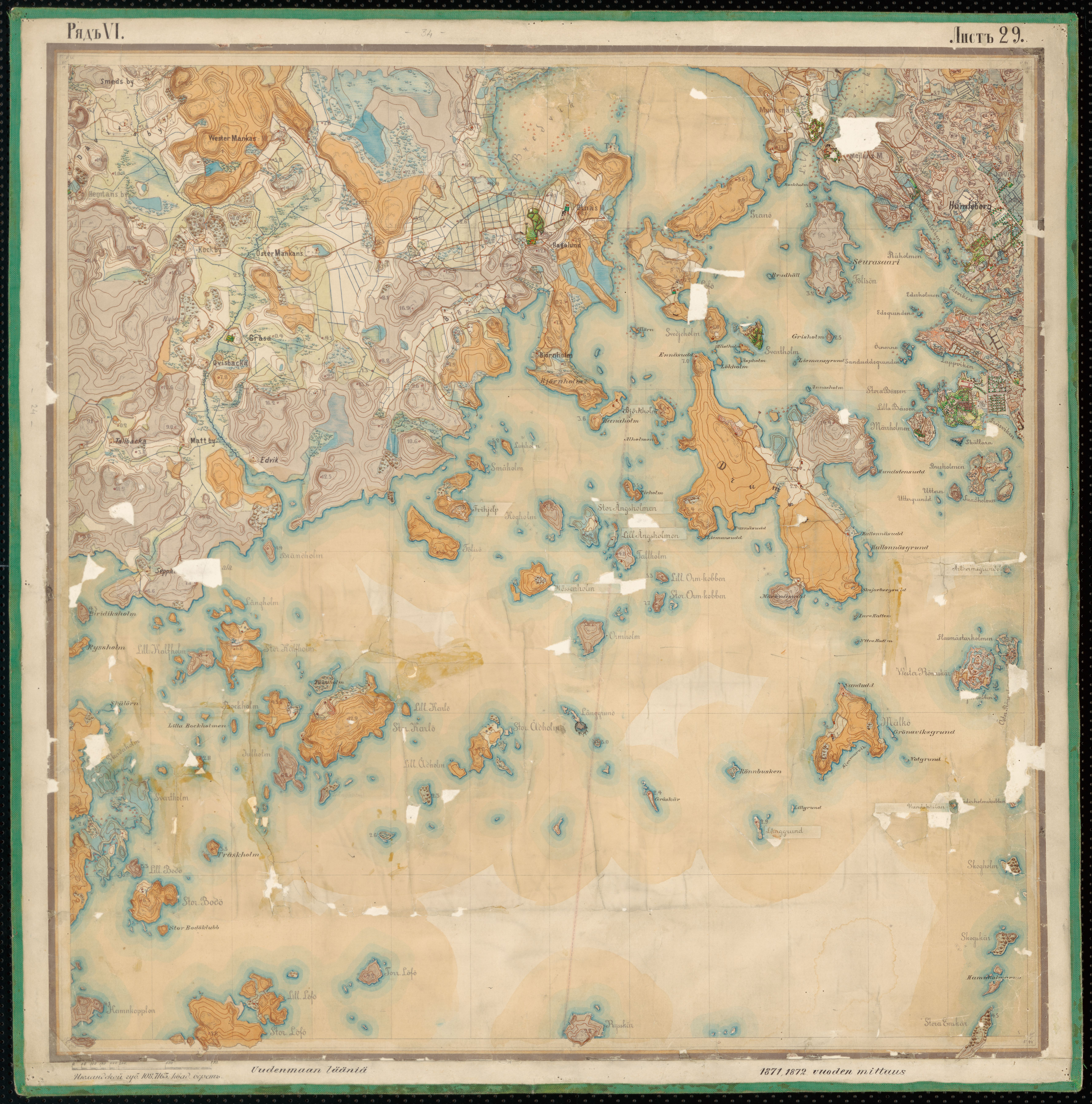
Russian military map showing southeastern parts of Espoo sometime between 1870 and 1907

There was a great sawmill in Bastvik back in 1883, where great ships from faraway seas came to lade lumber. There were many great bridges so that vessels could be laden simultaneously. After bringing colonial and other necessary goods to Helsinki, they came empty to Bastvik. [...] The superintendent was a German-born Hoffeldt.

— Katri Bergholm, reminiscing life in Bastvik, present-day Saunalahti, at the end of the 19th century.

Throughout the 19th century, most of Espoo's inhabitants worked in agriculture. The population was around 4,000, while most of the people lived in over 60 small villages. Halfway through the century, almost 90% of the population spoke Swedish as their first language. The wealthy estates and mansions of the parish required maids, farmhands and tenant farmers as their workforce to raise cattle, farm crops and raise vegetables in the kitchen gardens. Fishing was also common in the coastal areas. The Glims farmstead in Karvasmäki has been preserved as a museum to present rural life in Espoo during this period when industrial development was still minute in Finland.

The rural community in Espoo began to change in the latter half of the 19th century. Some brickyards had already been built in the 18th century on the grounds of Espoonkartano manor, located in the western part of the present-day city, but it was not until the economic reforms of Emperor Alexander II that the Industrial Revolution started to gain momentum in Finland. As the Russo-Finnish trade legislation liberalized, new brickyards were established in Espoonlahti and Kauklahti, as the shores of Espoo Bay provided high-quality clay for their use. The bricks were mostly carried with steamboats to the neighbouring Helsinki, the growing capital city of the grand duchy.

The most prominent industrial facility in 19th century Espoo was the steam-powered Bastvik Sawmill, founded in 1876. In addition to the growing lumber and brick industries, a joiners' workshop was established on the island of Staffan in 1886. Staffan Island became a home for a highly skilled and renowned community of joiners, colloquially known as the "University of Espoo" or the "University of Soukka".

==== World War I ====
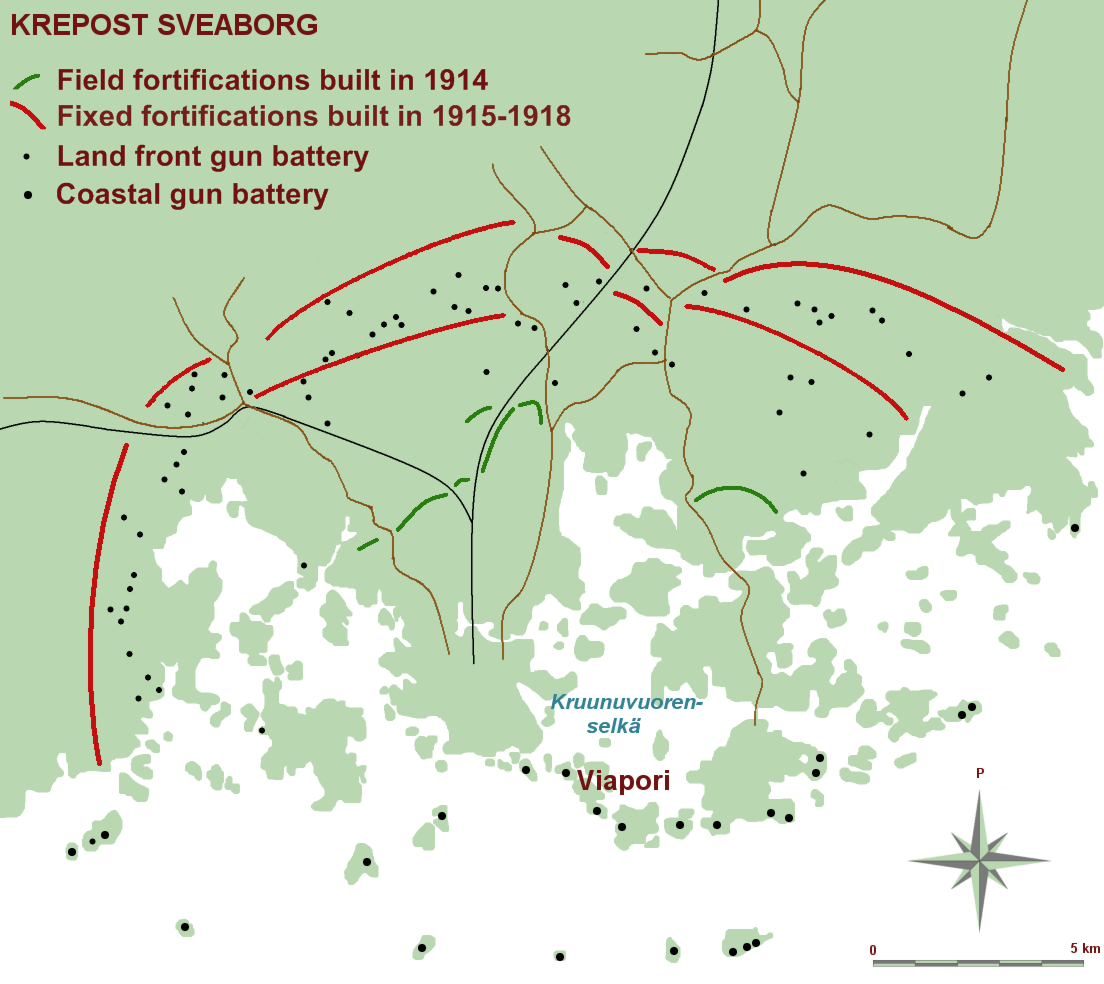
A map of "Krepost Sveaborg"

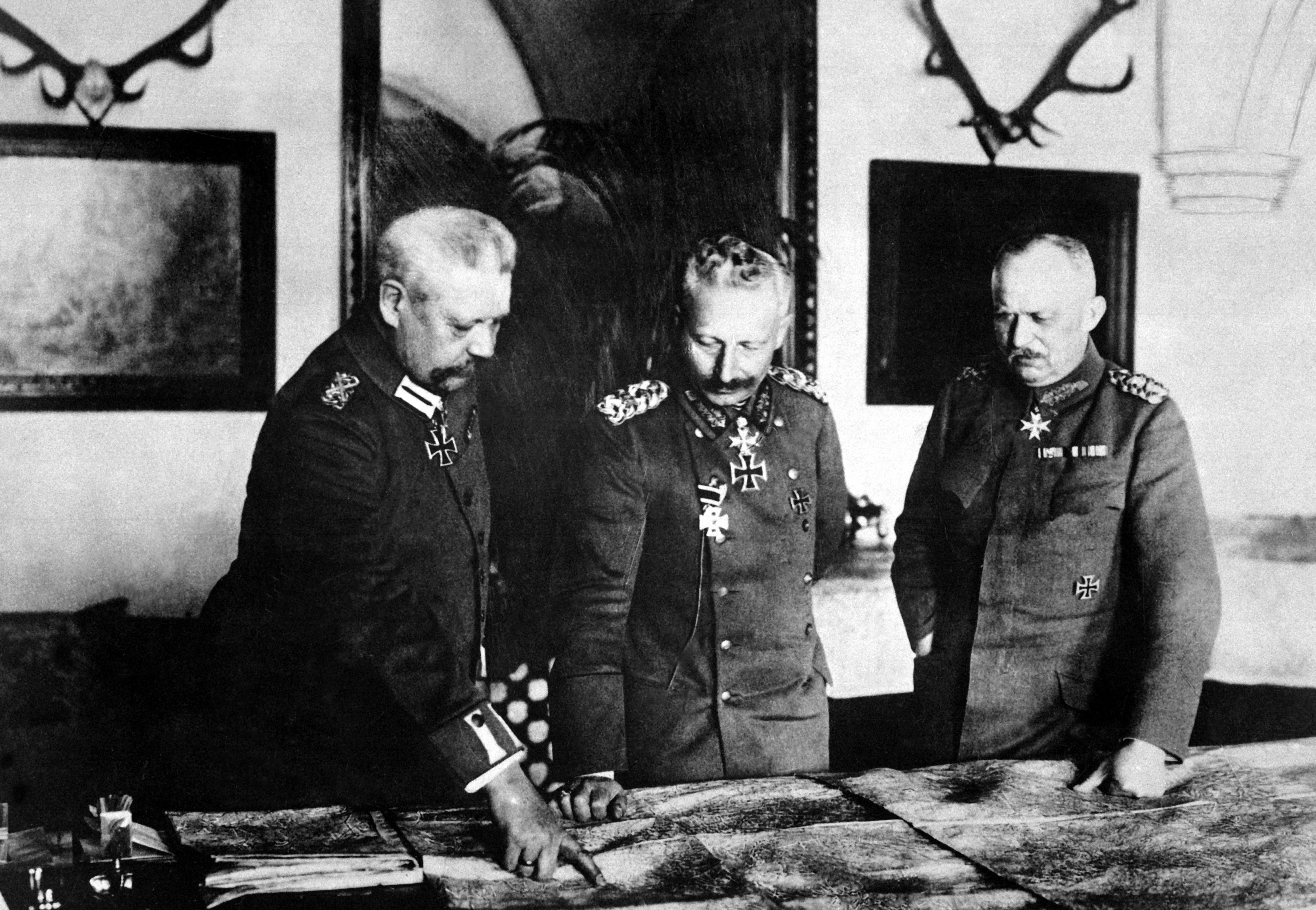
Military commanders of Germany during World War I: Paul von Hindenburg, emperor Wilhelm II and Erich Ludendorff

World War I had an effect on the Russian Empire and the Grand Duchy of Finland when the German Empire declared war on Russia on 1 August 1914. Russia immediately started preparing for war against Germany. At the start of the war, the main forces of the Russian Baltic Fleet had been concentrated at Sveaborg in front of Helsinki. The Russian military feared that Germany would use southern Finland to attack Petrograd, so Russia started building a fortification chain of over 20 kilometres (12 mi) surrounding Helsinki to protect it. Construction of the fortification started in 1915 and took almost three years.

Construction of the fortification chain required a huge amount of workforce. The construction was led by the engineering administration of Saint Petersburg, but in practice, the actual work was led by the engineering military staff in Sveaborg. The local engineering office was located in Leppävaara in Espoo. Although the Russian military tried to keep the construction of the fortification chain secret from the enemy, there are German intelligence reports with descriptions of the Russian fortification chain.

Because of the lack of available workforce, the Russians turned to expropriation allowed by Russian military law. The manor houses in Espoo were ordered to send one man and one horse each to work on the construction. The total number of workforce at the fortification is not known, but the expropriation resulted in 4,000 men, of which 1,300 were situated in Leppävaara and 1,500 in Tapiola in June 1916.

16-year-old Annukka Koskinen, who lived at the Bergans farm in Suur-Leppävaara, wrote about the expropriation in June 1916:

It was really shameless. Last year [the Russians] took control of three large buildings, and they would have taken the last one too, had we not complained to the office of the governor. For all of summer, they built fortifications all over the hill. Trees were cut down and new ones planted in their place. You know that only very few of these newly planted trees will survive. – This spring, [the soldiers] have shot at our fields during practice. Two days ago we received an order that the house, the large woodshed and the sauna have to be empty by noon on the next day.

The Russian Revolution in 1917 stopped work at the fortification. Finland declared its full independence in December 1917, and the fortifications were never actually needed to protect Saint Petersburg from a German attack. The fortifications only ever saw action in one battle during the Finnish Civil War, when the red forces in Leppävaara fought the German forces who had come to the aid of the whites on 14 April 1918. The fortifications were later used as ammunition storage and civil protection during World War II.

=== Finnish Civil War ===
==== Power vacuum ====
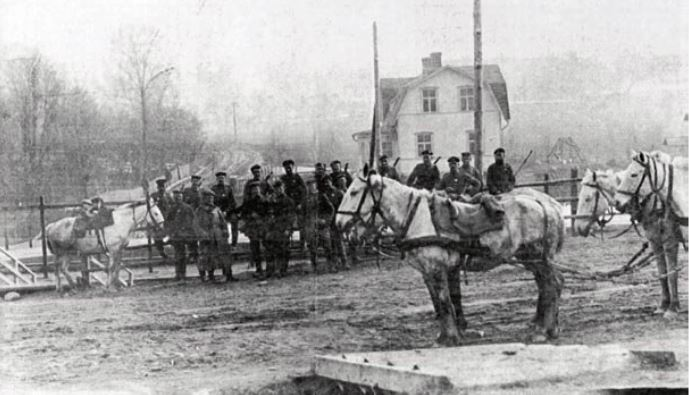
German soldiers in Leppävaara in 1918

After the February Revolution in 1917, Finland went through a power vacuum. The imperial rule had fallen, general order had broken and the police had been dispensed. Upholding the general order moved to a local level, and local militias, citizens' guards, fire brigades and security forces were founded. These forces were not originally founded for military purposes but to uphold the general order. The activity was voluntary-based, and the forces were organised for example during strikes.

In autumn 1917 the nature of the organisation became more military and the number of local workers' guards increased rapidly. The armed organisation was influenced by an acute lack of food, disappointment with the loss of the majority position of the Social Democratic Party of Finland at the 1917 Finnish parliamentary election, the Senate's desire for renovation, the fight for municipal power and fear of an armed uprising of the bourgeoisie.

===== Red and White Guards in Espoo =====
In Espoo, particularly Leppävaara was a restless area. The workers' association of Alberga founded an unarmed militia of ten people to uphold the general order. During summer and early autumn in 1917 there were local conflicts between the bourgeois guards and the workers' militia. In middle November the guards in Espoo on both sides had already started arming themselves.

In July 1917 the first bourgeois order guard was founded in Kauklahti, under the guise of a voluntary fire brigade. A little later a similar organisation was founded in Kilo, and these organisations joined forces in August to September. The guards had about 160 members in total at this point.

After the Finnish Civil War had broken out, many young men left Espoo to join the White Guards all over the countryside in Uusimaa. The most important of these was the Sigurds Guard in Kirkkonummi, of whose members 40 came from Espoo.

==== Red Espoo ====
At the start of the Civil War in January 1918, the Red Guards took control of Espoo. There were no actual battles between the Reds and the Whites during the revolution, as Espoo was in practice already under Red control. Municipal power was transferred from the municipal council and the municipal board to a social democratic municipal organisation. The Reds took control without bloodshed and strengthened their position by sending patrols all around Espoo to confiscate any weapons found in the houses they visited.

By order from the Finnish People's Delegation, a revolutionary court was founded in Espoo, with the Kauklahti-based worker Aleksi Aronen serving as its judge. The court sessions were held in Villa Odenwald in Kauniainen. Most of the sentences given by the court were prison sentences or fines. In addition, the Red Guard in Leppävaara had its own comrade court. The general staff of the Red Guard in Uusimaa had installed a curfew forbidding going outside after nine o'clock in the evening. Meetings were held in workers' houses assembling lists to provide support for the Red Guards. Patrols consisting of young men looking for food and weapons could take justice in their own hands in the typical form of red terror. In the spring, the Reds killed nine people in Espoo, of which six were civilians. Rumours of these acts of violence spread out, spreading fear among the people. Many people saw the municipal rule of the Reds as a reign of terror.

During the Civil War, many bourgeois people in Espoo, whom the Reds in power saw as a threat, fled to neighbouring municipalities, hidden cabins in the archipelago or forests in northern Espoo. For example, Hans Heimbürger, the speaker of the Espoo municipal council, fled to Degerö in Ingå in January together with his family. Two people from Espoo are said to have fled into caves to flee from the Red power.

==== After the war ====
The damages of the Civil War in Espoo were minimal, except for one primary school which had been hit by German bombing. However, many houses in Espoo suffered from famine after the Civil War. The war had cut off a large part of the foreign trade in Finland, which worsened the famine. Particularly the price of grain and other necessary foodstuffs had risen significantly, which caused price limits for the most important products. The situation eased out in 1919, but food regulation was only finally discontinued in 1921.

After the end of the war, the White Guards went out to look for Reds fled into the forests in Espoo for a long time. In June 1918 the White Guards appealed to the municipal council of Espoo to ask for funds to travel to prison camps in order to provide expert help in judging reds from Espoo. 12 members of the Red Guard in Espoo had been sent to prison camps.

Under the 1918 peasant law, peasants were freed from the power of their private masters, which led to a widespread settlement of steadless population in Finland. From 1919 to 1925 about 150 peasants and crofters in Espoo bought land for themselves with the grant given by the Finnish state. The new farms thus acquired still remained small, which caused the need to acquire further income through forestry and handyman work.

=== 20th century ===
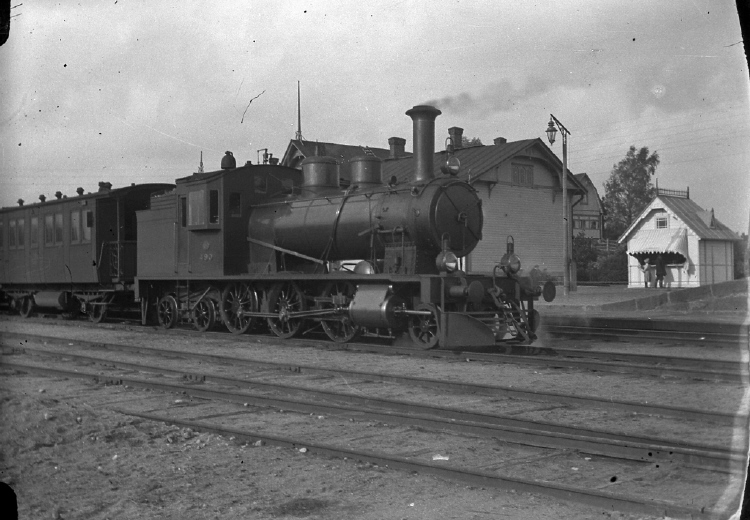
VR Class Vk3 steam locomotive at Kauklahti railway station in the 1920s

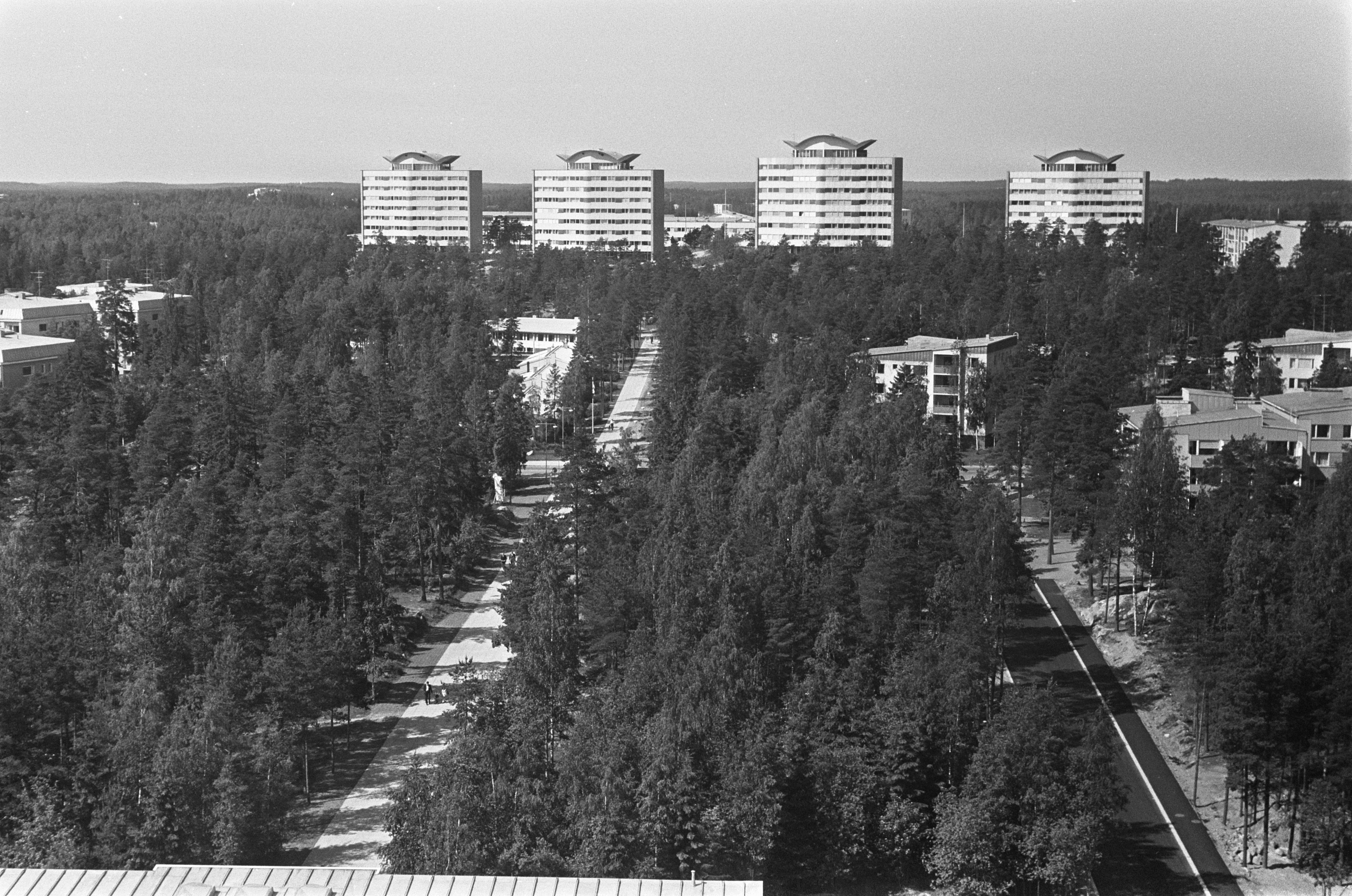
The so-called "Hip flask houses" in Tapiola were built from 1959 to 1961. This picture is from 1967.

In 1920, Espoo was only a rural municipality of about 9,000 inhabitants, of whom 70% were Swedish speaking. Agriculture was the primary source of income, with 75% of the population making their living from farming.

Kauniainen was separated from Espoo in 1920, and it gained city rights the same year as Espoo, in 1972. However, the border between Espoo and Kauniainen was only defined in the late 1940s.

Espoo started to grow rapidly in the 1940s and 1950s. Shortly after the end of the Continuation War, the population of Espoo grew by four thousand as frontline soldiers and evacuees from ceded territories (including the Porkkalanniemi peninsula, leased to the Soviet Union between 1944 and 1956) were settled in the city.

Espoo's location right next to the capital city of Helsinki attracted people working in the capital city to move into the rapidly growing neighbour city, and already before World War II there were many suburbs along the Rantarata railway, such as Leppävaara, Kilo and Kauklahti which had formed into an industrial area. After the new Jorvaksentie road (predecessor to the Länsiväylä highway) was completed, new detached houses were built along it, particularly in Westend. After the war, many detached houses for soldiers having fought at the frontline were built in Espoo. The highest increase in population only started in the early 1950s when the Asuntosäätiö foundation started construction of the garden city of Tapiola, and construction of a new campus area of the Helsinki University of Technology started in the neighbouring district of Otaniemi.

In the 1940s and 1950s Espoo grew more rapidly than it could afford. The infrastructure of Espoo was not prepared to handle such rapid growth. There was no time for proper zoning, instead new houses were built as people bought lots in the city.

A major change happened in the late 1940s as the Helsinki University of Technology moved from Hietalahti in Helsinki to larger premises in Otaniemi, and the planning of the Tapiola garden city district was started. As the city did not have enough money to fund the construction of the student village in Otaniemi, the technical university students took to the matter to their own hands, both by gathering money through various activities and taking part in the actual construction. About 800 thousand bricks from the Embassy of the Soviet Union in Helsinki, which had been destroyed in the bombing of Helsinki, were used to build student apartments in Otaniemi.

From 1944 to 1956 the Espoonlahti bay between Espoo and Kirkkonummi served as the border of the Porkkala Naval Base under the control of the Soviet Union. A large part of Kirkkonummi, as well as a narrow strip of the sea and a couple of islands in Espoo were included in the area of the naval base. In Espoo, the Kauklahti railway station near the border to the naval base became a tightly controlled border station between Finland and the Soviet Union. The land connection to Porkkala went via the Kivenlahti bridge. During the time of the naval base, part of the western coast had been evacuated, and the windows of the houses in the border villages on the Soviet side had to be covered during night time. The windows of the trains travelling through the area rented to the Soviet Union had to be covered with wooden hatches from the outside for the duration of passage through Soviet territory, and could only be reopened upon reentry to Finland.

Unlike the neighbouring city of Helsinki, Espoo failed to develop a proper city centre, forming instead into an area of multiple centres. This was partly because a 1968 zoning plan where Espoo was divided into four separate areas, with the administrative centre situated in Muurala (later known as Espoon keskus), partly because most of the land in Espoo was not actually owned by the city but was instead in private ownership, directing new construction to wherever it was possible instead of using a proper zoning plan.

The rather tightly populated districts of Tapiola and Leppävaara in eastern Espoo underwent attempts to separate from the city of Espoo, from two directions: on the one hand, the inhabitants of the districts wanted them to become independent municipalities, while on the other hand, the neighbouring city of Helsinki wanted to annex the districts into Helsinki. These attempts all failed and the districts remained as part of Espoo, which changed from a rural municipality first to a market town in 1963 and then to a city in 1972. The new administrative centre of the city, Espoon keskus, was built in the 1970s around the Espoo railway station and the old grey stone church in Espoo.

The non-centralised nature of Espoo led to significant differences between its districts. Different parts of Espoo included the wealthy garden city district of Tapiola, large areas that still remained as countryside, and new suburbs such as Haukilahti, Karakallio and Soukka. Disagreements between different districts were common and gave Espoo a nationwide reputation of a quarrelsome municipality.

The city quickly developed from a rural municipality into a fully-fledged industrial city, gaining city rights in 1972. On 1 January 1972, when Espoo gained city rights, it had a population of over 100,000, making it into the fourth-largest city in Finland at the time, after Helsinki, Turku and Tampere.

Due to its proximity to Helsinki, Espoo soon became popular amongst people working in the capital. In the fifty years from 1950 to 2000, the population of Espoo grew from 22,000 to 210,000, mainly due to large-scale migration from other parts of Finland. Since 1945, the majority of people in Espoo have been Finnish-speaking. In 2006, the Swedish-speaking inhabitants represented barely 9% of the total population. The population growth is still continuing, but at a slower rate. In the summer of 2022, the population of Espoo grew to over 300,000 inhabitants.

=== Market town and city ===
Espoo became a market town in 1963. The population of Espoo at the time was 65,000. About a decade later, Espoo became a city in 1972. The districts of Suvela, Olari, Matinkylä and Kivenlahti were built in the 1970s. The first of the high-rise buildings in Keilaniemi, the Neste head office was built in 1976.

Many of the important roads in Finland go through Espoo. Finland's first highway, the Finnish national road 1, was built in 1962. The Ring I beltway was also built in the 1960s. The next outer beltway, Ring II, was taken into use in 2000.

In the original plan for the centre of the Tapiola garden city, architect Aarne Ervi had reserved a space for a theatre building at the end of the fountain pool, but the theatre building was never built. The decision to build a new cultural centre was made in a celebratory session of the Espoo city council on 1 January 1972, when Espoo became a city. Two years later the first room program of the new building was completed, defining its needs and surface area. An architecture contest was held for its design in 1979. About 60 different proposals were submitted for the contest, with architect Arto Sipinen's design Kuunsilta ("Moonlight bridge") being chosen as the winner. Construction of the Espoo Cultural Centre started in 1986. The foundation stone was laid on Jean Sibelius Day on 8 December. The building was constructed of quartz sand bricks, travertine tiles, glass and mosaic concrete, and its cost rose to about 130 million Finnish markka. The building was completed in January 1989.

=== 21st century ===
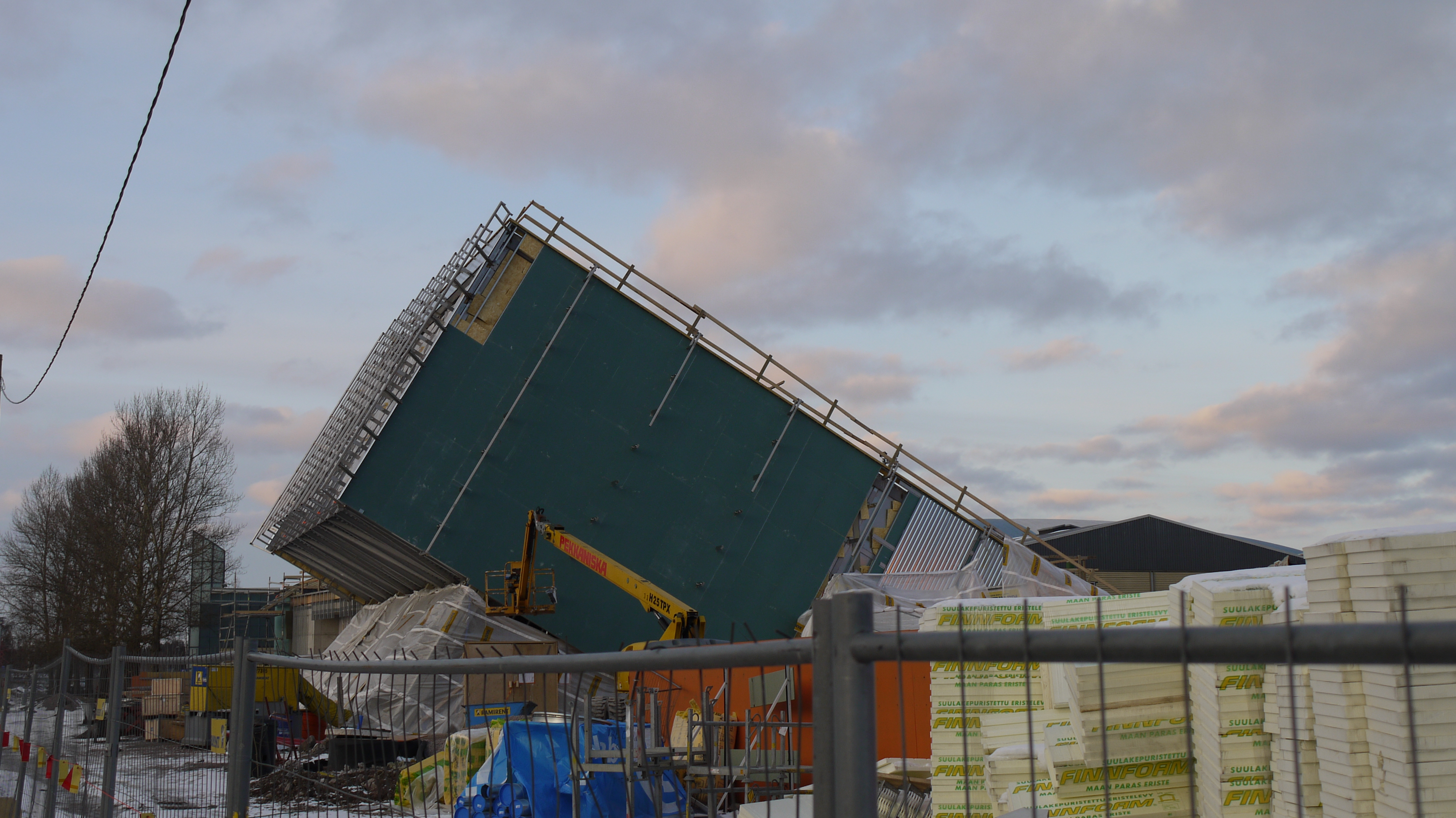
The Urheilupuisto metro station under construction in February 2016

By the start of the 21st century, Espoo had become the second largest city in the entire country in Finland with a population of slightly over 200 thousand, second only to the capital city Helsinki.

The Länsimetro transport line started construction in 2010 and its first stage was taken into use on 18 November 2017.

== Geography ==
=== General ===
The districts and major areas of Espoo

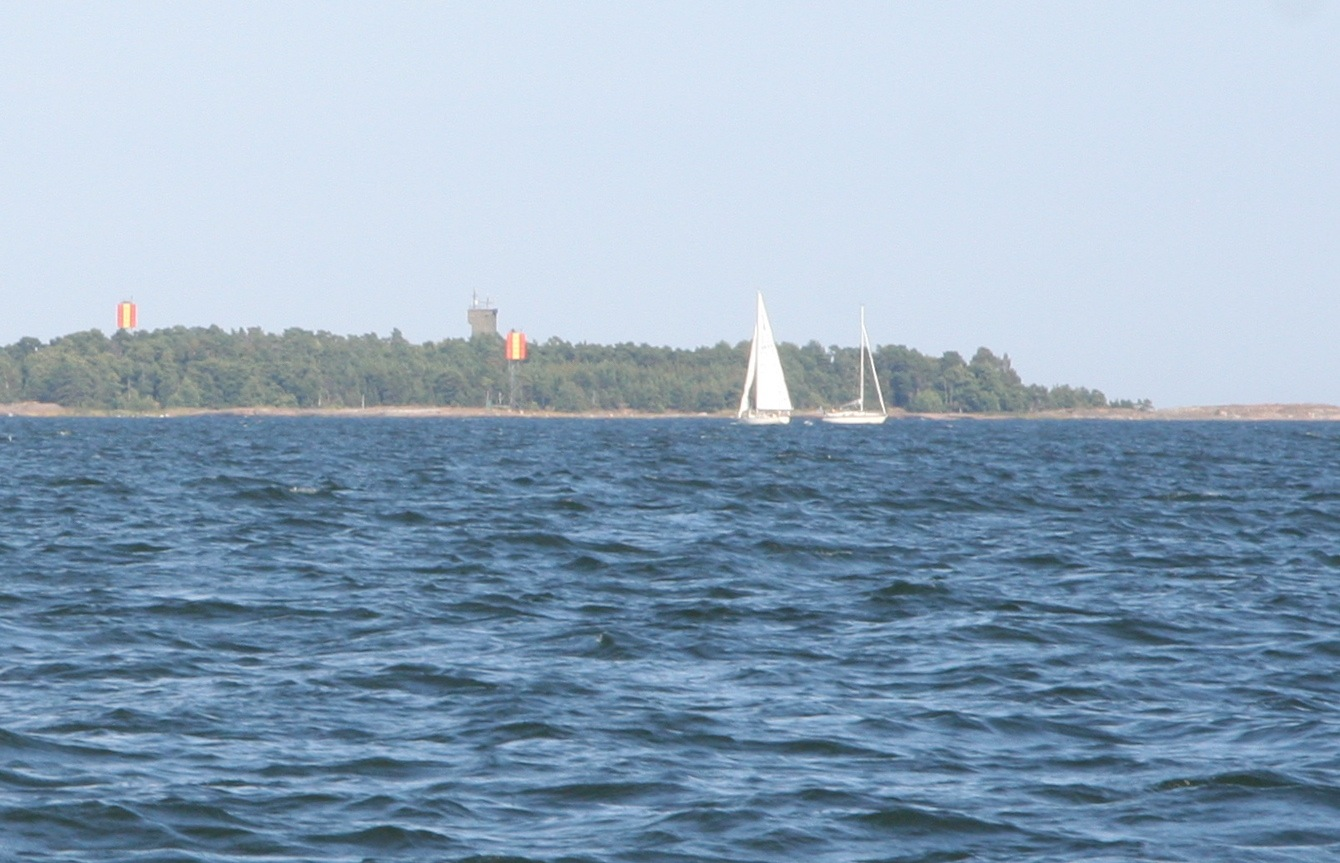
The bare cliffs on the islands of the outer archipelago change into forested islands closer to the shore. This picture shows the former fortification island of Kytö.

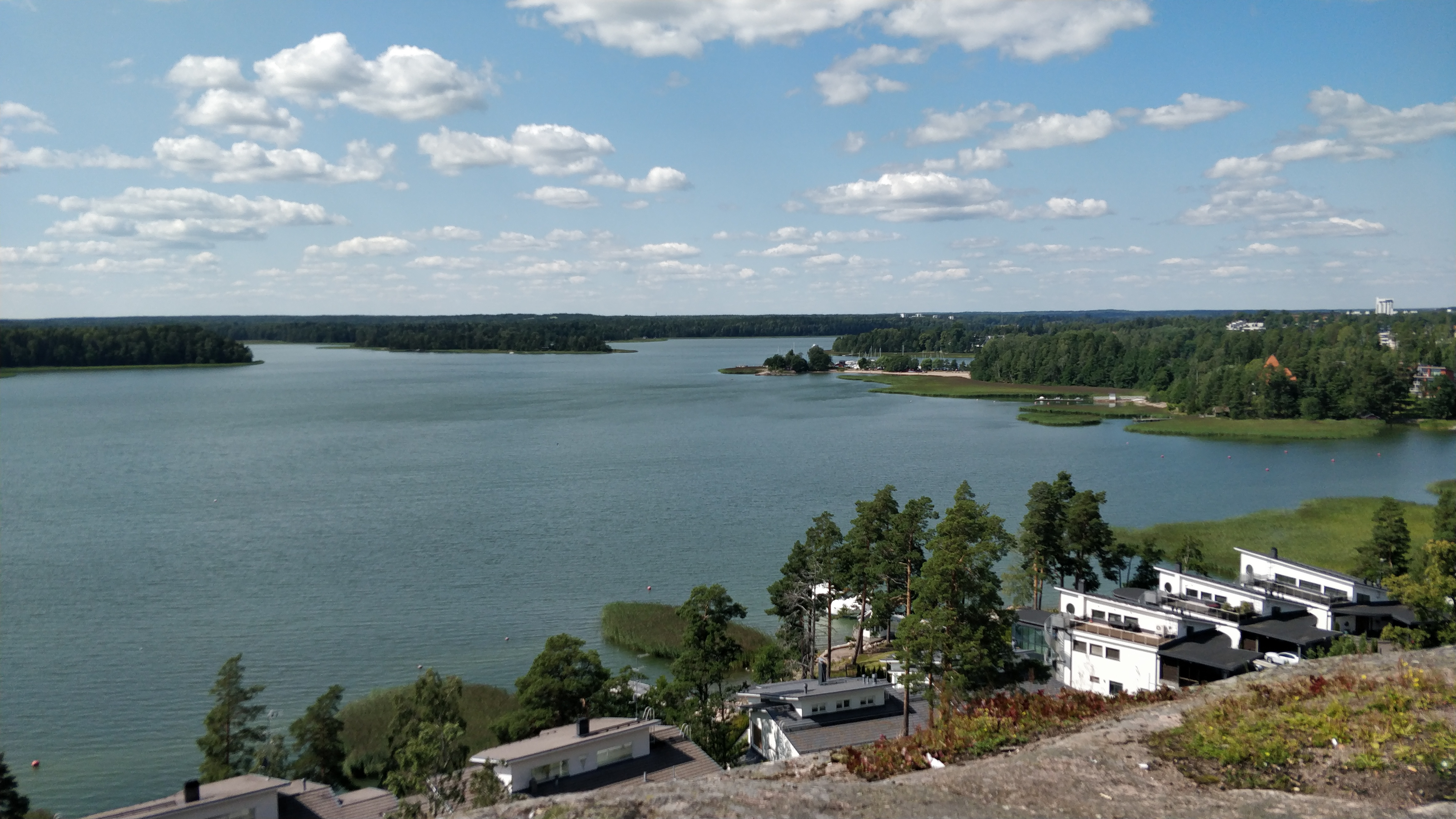
A landscape view from the Kasavuori hill in Soukka

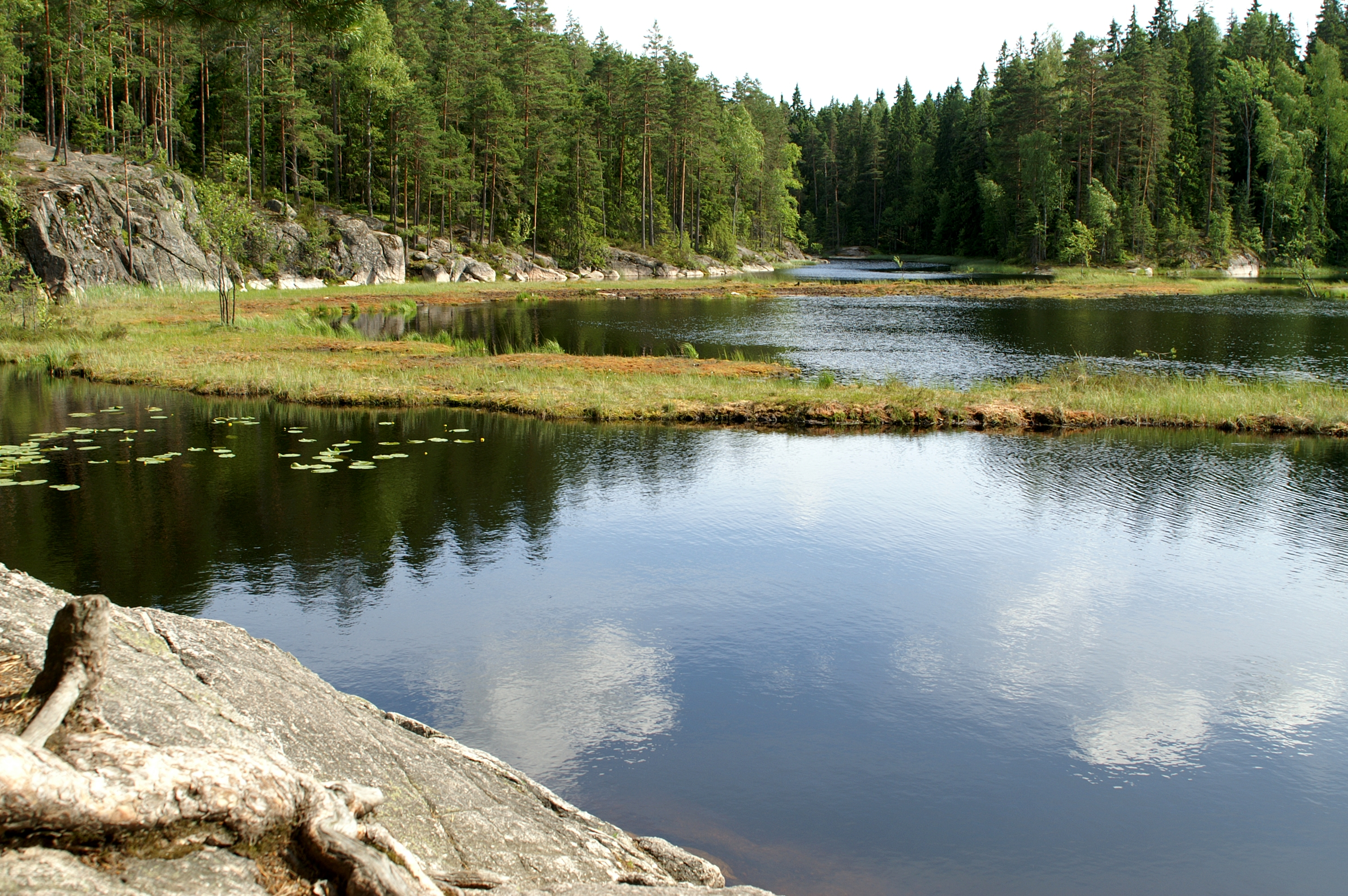
The Nuuksio national park

Espoo has an area of 528 km^{2} (203.9 sq mi)—312 km^{2} (120.5 sq mi) (59%) of land and 216 km^{2} (83.4 sq mi) (41%) of water. Sea water makes up 37% of the total area of Espoo and inland water makes up a bit over 3%. To the north of the lush river areas and the fields in central Espoo, the archipelagal and coastal zone in southern Espoo changes into lake-filled and rocky terrain. At some places the lake areas in northern Espoo resemble the Finnish Lakeland. The largest part of the lake ridge in Nuuksio is located in Espoo, but a part of it is located in neighbouring Vihti. The largest lakes in Uusimaa, Lohjanjärvi and Hiidenvesi, are located west of the ridge.

The highest point in Espoo is Velskola at 114.2 m (375 ft) above sea level, and the lowest point is at sea level. Espoo is a part of the Helsinki capital region and is contiguously bordered by the cities, towns and municipalities of Kirkkonummi, Vihti, Nurmijärvi, Vantaa, Kauniainen and Helsinki.

For a city of its size, Espoo is home to exceptionally large natural areas. The southern part of the city is characterized by maritime environment, including a varied coastline and an archipelago consisting of 165 islands.

=== Bedrock ===
The minerals and structures of the rocky and hilly topography of Espoo were formed about 1880 to 1650 million years ago. Particularly the Weichselian glaciation has had an effect on the current environment – the continental ice sheet withdrew from what is now Espoo about 13 thousand years ago. The first areas to surface from underneath the sea were the high hills in northern Espoo, such as Mustankorvenkallio. The numerous smooth cliffs on the seashore and in the archipelago were caused by wear by the continental ice sheet; there are grooves on their surfaces, indicating the direction of the flow of the ice sheet. Icebergs split off from the ice sheet have transported glacial erratics, including those in Kunnarla, Soukka and Suomenoja.

Main rock types in the Espoo bedrock include gneiss, migmatite, granite, gabbro, amphibolite and mica schist. Rare orbicular granite can be found in Nuuksio, the deposit is internationally valuable. At many places there are thick layers of clay on top of the bedrock, and fields were plowed onto clay-covered valleys. The thickness of the clay layers was mainly formed in the Baltic Ice Lake and the Yoldia Sea. The effect of the bedrock on the traditional Espoo natural landscape was significant; high and steep cliffs stand up from shallowly waving fields. The oblong lakes in northern Espoo are located in valleys in the bedrock. The formation of the bedrock has determined the shapes of the coastline, such as Espoonlahti and Laajalahti. Because of upthrust, paludification of forests and overgrowth of lakes, bogs and layers of peat have formed on top of the clay at some places.

=== Sea area ===
The sea area of Espoo is a considerably narrow strip between the sea areas of Helsinki and Kirkkonummi. The depth of the southern part of the sea area, in the outer archipelago, is a few dozen metres at the most. The ship route between Helsinki and Stockholm, Sweden goes through the outermost parts of the sea area which contains small treeless, sea-washed islets. One of them is the former fortification island of Kytö. The smallest islands are shallow islets, such as Stenskär. They are significant nesting grounds for birds and many of them are nature-protected areas. In summertime there might be flowering meadow patches on the islands. The islands closest to the Espoo shoreline include Stora Herrö, Pentala, Kopplorna and Lehtisaaret. The islands host many vacation buildings, and they are often referred to as an intermediary archipelago.

The islands in the inner archipelago are larger and lusher and contain boat harbours and buildings, as well as permanent settlements on the islands closest to the shore. There is a land connection from the mainland to the inhabited islands in Suvisaaristo and it forms a district of its own, with a more rural image than most of Espoo.

The sea area extends inland at many places as bays, of which the largest are Espoonlahti in the west and Laajalahti in the east. Bays on the shoreline between them include Nuottalahti, Haukilahti and Otsolahti. The bays are shallow and contain many islands, particularly in Espoonlahti. Most of the islands in Laajalahti are located across the municipal border in Helsinki. The largest peninsula in Espoo is Soukka, fracturing into an archipelago in the south. Thus the peninsula hardly offers any views to the open sea. The nearest ship harbours are located in Helsinki, while the Espoo shoreline contains many small boat harbours, the largest being the boat harbour in Suomenoja. The maritime traffic in front of Espoo mainly consists of motor boats of various sizes, water scooters and ferries handling traffic in the archipelago.

In terms of natural geography, the coastal waters of Espoo are divided into four different sea areas, consisting counting from the west of Espoonlahti, Suvisaaristo-Lauttasaari and Seurasaari. The fourth sea area is Helsinki-Porkkala to the south of the other three. The surface area of the Espoonlahti sea area is 19.2 km^{2} (7.4 sq mi). The Espoonlahti nature preserve area is located in its northern part. The western part of the sea area is located in the neighbouring municipality of Kirkkonummi. The surface area of the Suvisaaristo-Lauttasaari sea area is 48.5 km^{2} (18.7 sq mi). It reaches from the shores of the islands of Stora Herrö and Pentala up to the West Harbour in Helsinki. The surface area of the Seurasaari sea area is 13.1 km^{2} (5.1 sq mi). The Laajalahti nature preserve area is located in its northwestern part. Most of the sea area is located in neighbouring Helsinki. The surface area of the Helsinki-Porkkala sea area is 400.5 km^{2} (154.6 sq mi). It reaches from the eastern shore of the Porkkalanniemi peninsula up to Suomenlinna and Santahamina. Islands in the sea area include Kytö, Stenskär, Knapperskär and Gåsgrund.

=== Shoreline ===
The shoreline of Espoo is about 58 km (36 mi) long and there are 165 islands in front of it. The shoreline is diverse and contains decomposing bays, reed beds, sandy beaches, coastal cliffs and boat harbours. The district of Westend contains private house lots reaching to the sea shore, while the sea shore in the rest of Espoo is mainly in public use. The Rantaraitti hiking route spans almost the entire sea shore of Espoo. The district of Kivenlahti contains coastal cliffs, man-made shoreline and sandy beaches.

The land in Espoo is rising by about a quarter of a metre per century and the moist land rise shores are slowly becoming bogs.

=== Continental area ===
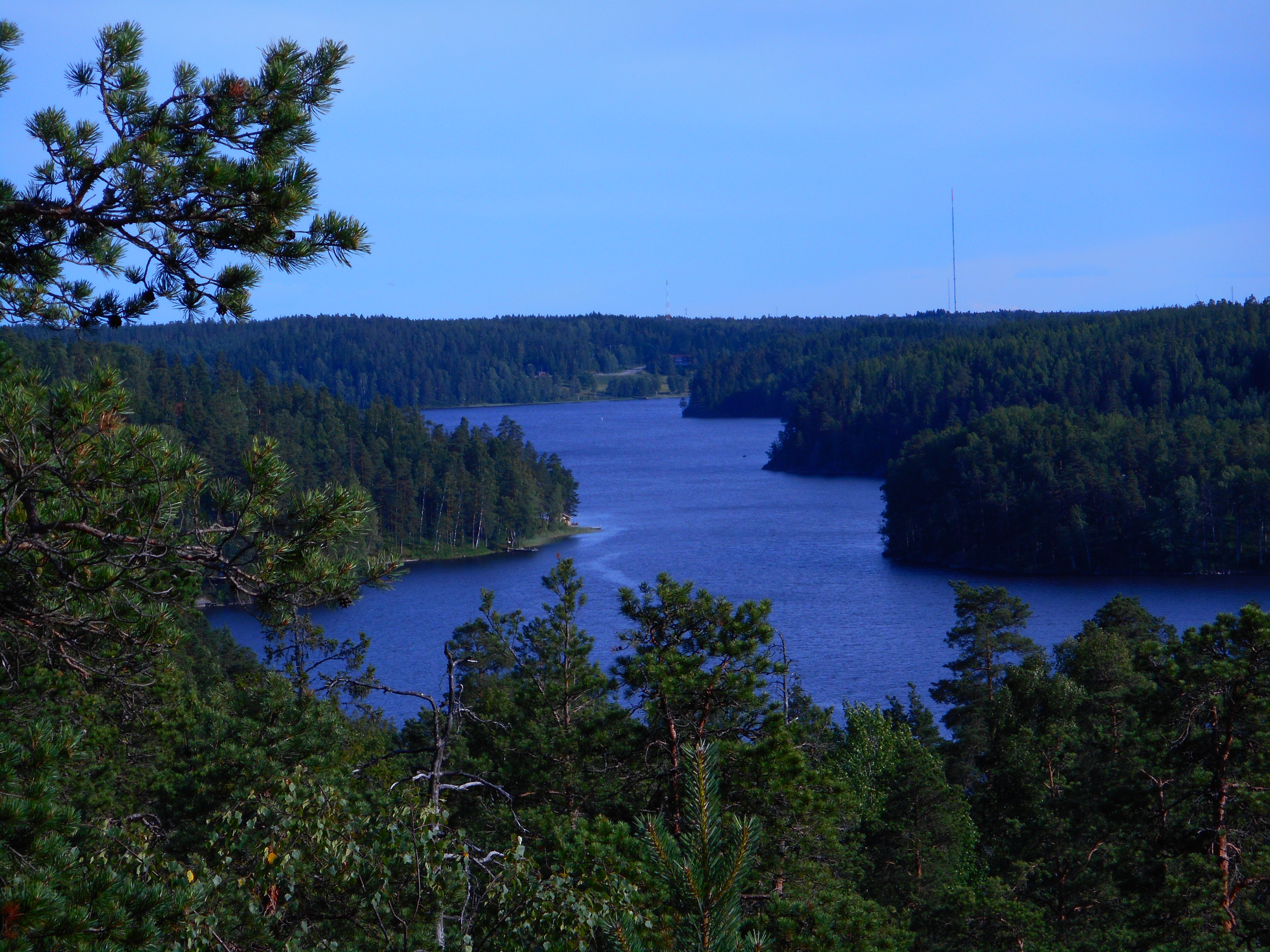
Lake Pitkäjärvi in Nuuksio in northern Espoo

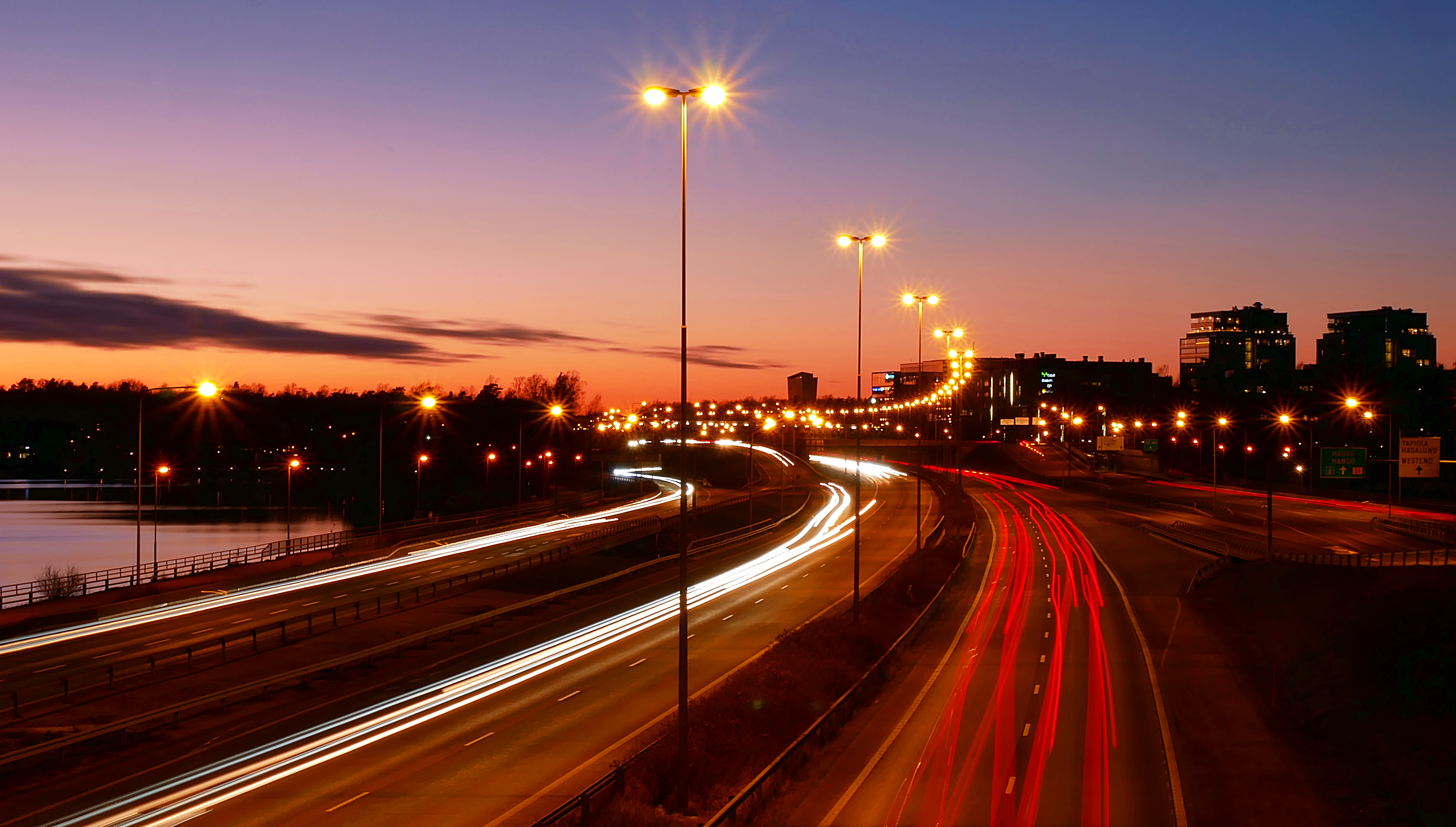
A view of the Länsiväylä highway in southern Espoo, at the coast of the Gulf of Finland

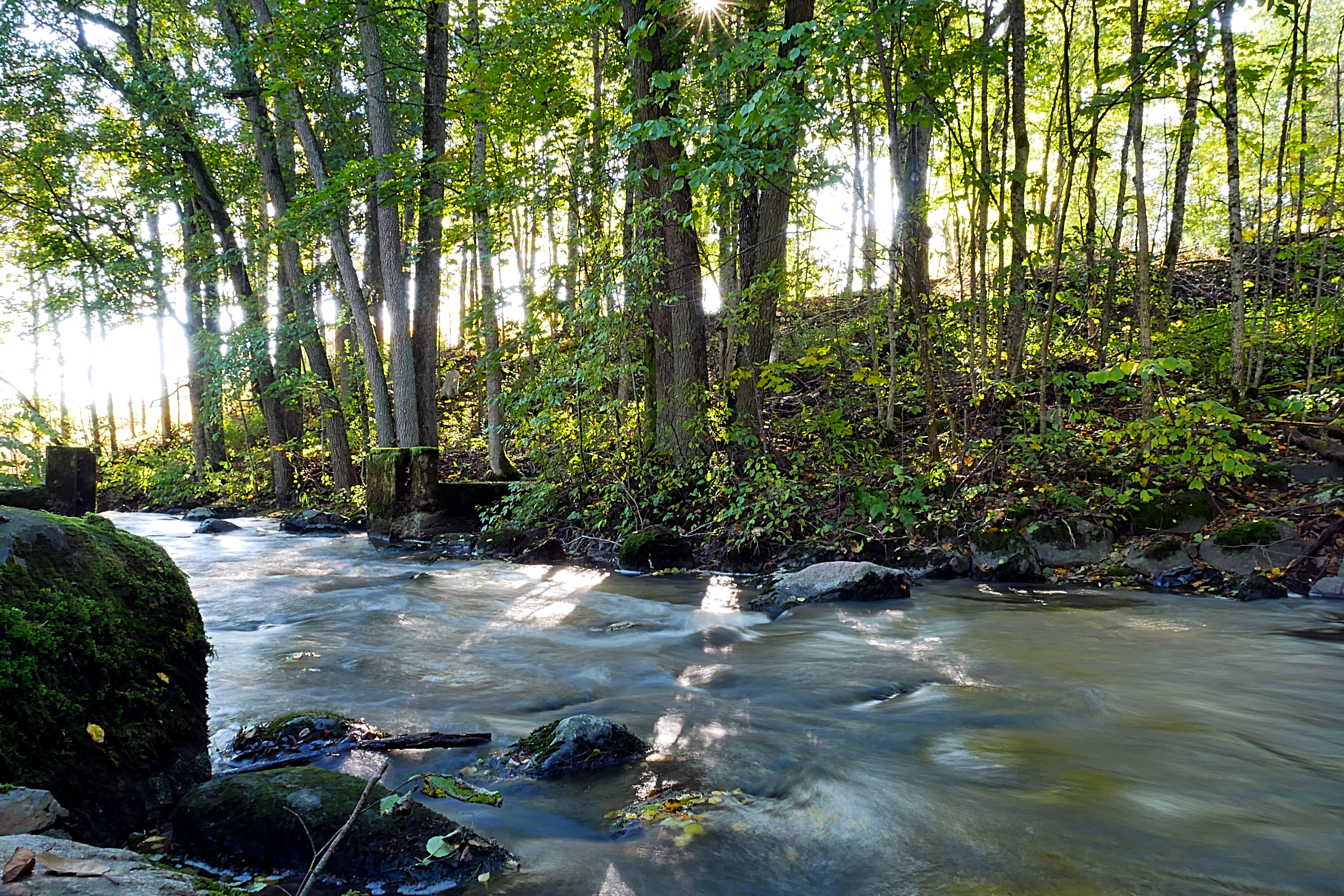
The Mankinjoki river flows rapidly in central Espoo.

There are six Natura 2000 areas in Espoo: the Bånberget forest area, Espoonlahti-Saunalahti (partly located in Kirkkonummi), the Laajalahti bird waters, Matalajärvi, Nuuksio (partly located in Kirkkonummi and Vihti) and the bogs, groves and old forests in Vestra (partly located in Vantaa). The forests in Espoo are mainly pine barrens consisting mostly of spruces and pines, with some deciduous trees. There are lush and diverse groves in some places, containing many hardwood trees such as oak. The ecological core area of southern Espoo is the Espoo Central Park, consisting mainly of two forest massives: Harmaakallo and Bosmalm.

The most famous and most popular nature area in Espoo is the Nuuksio National Park located on the lake highland of northern Espoo, reaching over to Kirkkonummi and Vihti. As well as the contiguous forest and pools of sweet water, Nuuksio contains small bogs and meadows. There are also lush grove-like brook valleys in the area.

The highest spot in Espoo, Mustankorvenkallio, is located in Velskola to the southwest of Saarijärvi 114 m (374 ft) above sea level and over 40 m (130 ft) above the water level of Saarijärvi. There are also considerably high spots very near the coast, such as the Kasavuori hill in Soukka, rising to 44 m (144 ft) above sea level.

=== Inland waters ===
There are over a hundred lakes and ponds in Espoo, of which 73 have an area of over a hectare. The lakes in Espoo were formed when the land slowly started rising after the continental ice sheet had thawed, and water started flowing into the crevices in the bedrock. The oldest lakes in Espoo are Kalatoin, Iso Majaslampi, Orajärvi and Pieni Majaslampi, all located over 80 m (260 ft) above sea level. At that time, what is now the Baltic Sea was in a so-called Yoldia Sea phase, which had formed when the surface of the Baltic Ice Lake had lowered tens of metres in a short time. Nuuksio slowly expanded into part of the mainland and new lakes were formed when the sea level sank. Development stopped for about a millennium and a half when the ancient Baltic Sea changed into the Ancylus Lake. Its surface was originally about 60 m (200 ft) above the current sea level. The Ancylus Lake formed into the salty Littorina Sea when the current Danish Straits started opening up. The surface of the Littorina Sea was about 34 m (112 ft) above the current sea level. At that time, almost all lakes in northern Espoo had been separated from the sea. Only the lake Nuuksion Pitkäjärvi remained as a narrow, fjord-like bay. The shore of the Littorina Sea remained at its place for a long time as upthrust slowed down. Rocky rims remain of the ancient sea shore on hills and cliffs. Nuuksion Pitkäjärvi only separated from the sea and became an inland lake about five millennia ago. About four millennia ago the land had risen so far that also Lake Bodom, Lippajärvi and other pools in central Espoo changed from shallow bays into lakes.

Most of the lakes in Espoo are located to the north of the Finnish national road 1, particularly in the lake highlands in Nuuksio. There are three pools named Pitkäjärvi ("long lake"): Pitkäjärvi, Nuuksion Pitkäjärvi and Velskolan Pitkäjärvi. The largest lake in Espoo is Lake Bodom with a surface area of 4.1 km^{2} (1.6 sq mi) and an average depth of 4.3 m (14 ft). The largest depth of Nuuksion Pitkäjärvi is 18 m (59 ft) and the average depth is 6.5 m (21 ft), and there are tens of lakes and ponds in its drainage basin of 60 km^{2} (23 sq mi). There are few lakes in southern Espoo. The shallow lake Hannusjärvi with a surface area of six hectares is located in Kaitaa and the small lake Pentalanjärvi is located in the island of Pentala.

Because the sweet water pools to the south of the Salpausselkä ridges formed when the ancient bays separated from the sea into lakes because of upthrust, only very few islands developed in them. One of the few inland islands in Espoo is an island of 15 ha (37 acres) in the lake Saarijärvi located near the border to Vihti. There was a suggestion to name the rocky island covered in pine forests as Partiosaari, but nothing became of this.

The differences in the surface heights of the lakes in Espoo are considerable. Lake Pieni Majaslampi is located the highest up, 97 m (318 ft) above sea level. Lake Saarijärvi near it is located 25 m (82 ft) lower. Because of the height differences, small rapids sometimes form in spring time in the creeks between adjacent water pools.

=== Features ===
Although Espoo is relatively highly populated, it has large amounts of the countryside and natural wilderness, particularly in the city's western and northern portions. The city has a total of 71 lakes, the largest of which are Lake Bodom, Nuuksion Pitkäjärvi, Vanhankylän Pitkäjärvi, Loojärvi, Velskolan Pitkäjärvi, Saarijärvi, Matalajärvi, Siikajärvi, and Lippajärvi. The city has a large coastline on the Gulf of Finland.

Espoo has six Natura 2000 protected areas: Bånberget forests, Espoonlahti–Saunalahti bay area (partially in Kirkkonummi), Laajalahti bay, Matalajärvi lake, Nuuksio National Park (partially in Kirkkonummi and Vihti), as well as forests in Vestra (partially in Vantaa).

The official animal of Espoo is the Siberian flying squirrel, the official bird is the common blackbird, and the official plant is Anemone nemorosa.

=== Flora and fauna ===
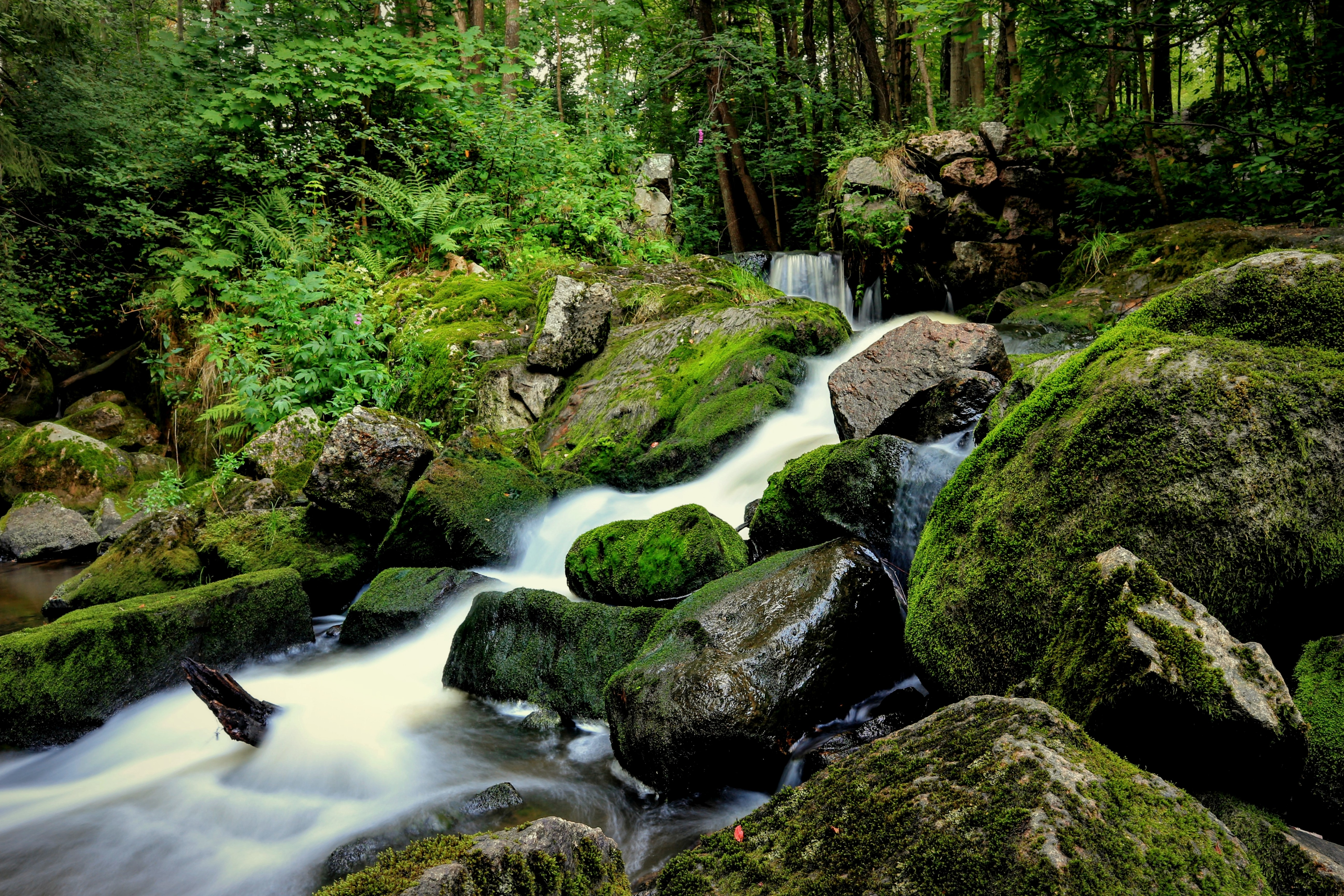
Rapids in Bemböle

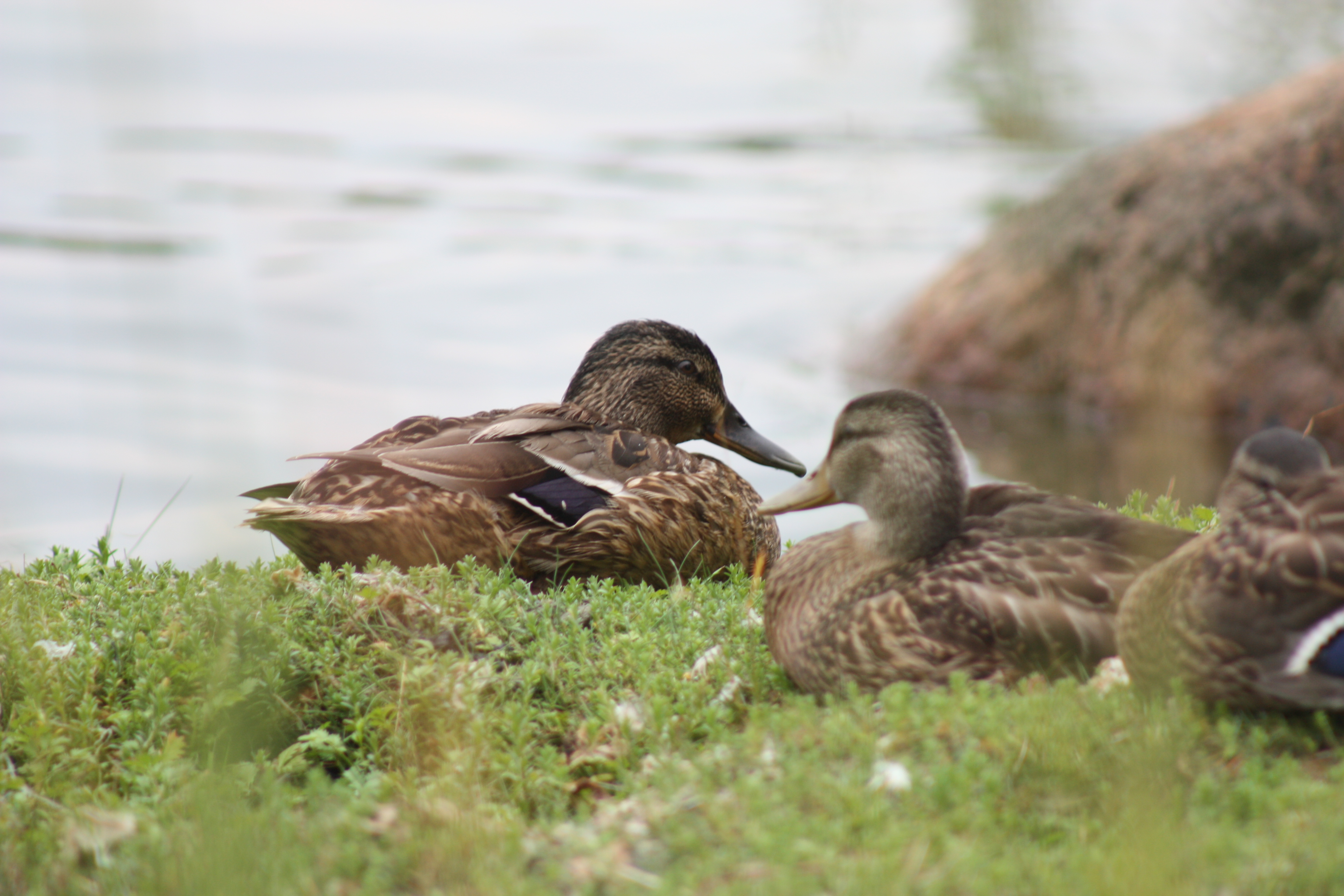
Mallards in Matinkylä

The city's Central Park's fauna represents a typical range of Finnish forest species. The most common flora in the Central Park includes Equisetum, ferns, Anemone, Lythrum and Orchidaceae. Common mammal species present in Espoo include the European hare and the mountain hare, the raccoon dog, the red squirrel, the elk, the red fox, various bat species, the European badger, as well as the roe deer and the white-tailed deer, which was introduced to Finland in the 1930s as a gift from Finnish American migrants.

The Suomenoja Bird Reserve in Finnoo, southern Espoo, is considered to be nationally significant for its bird diversity. Among others, there are endangered moorhens, as well as horned grebes and gadwalls. The most common and audible maritime bird species is the black-headed gull, but the whooper swan is also a common sight in the city's archipelago, where white-tailed eagles can be found as well.

The city is home to 73 vulnerable or endangered species, including the Siberian flying squirrel, whose Finnish populations have experienced a steep decline for many decades due to logging. The flying squirrel is considered to be the official animal of Espoo, and the squirrel populations are especially plentiful in the northernmost parts of the city. However, the flying squirrel is also present in some southern areas, including the Central Park, Soukka, Espoon keskus, Tapiola, Laajalahti, Hannusmetsä and Matinkylä.

== Climate ==
=== Temperature and rainfall ===
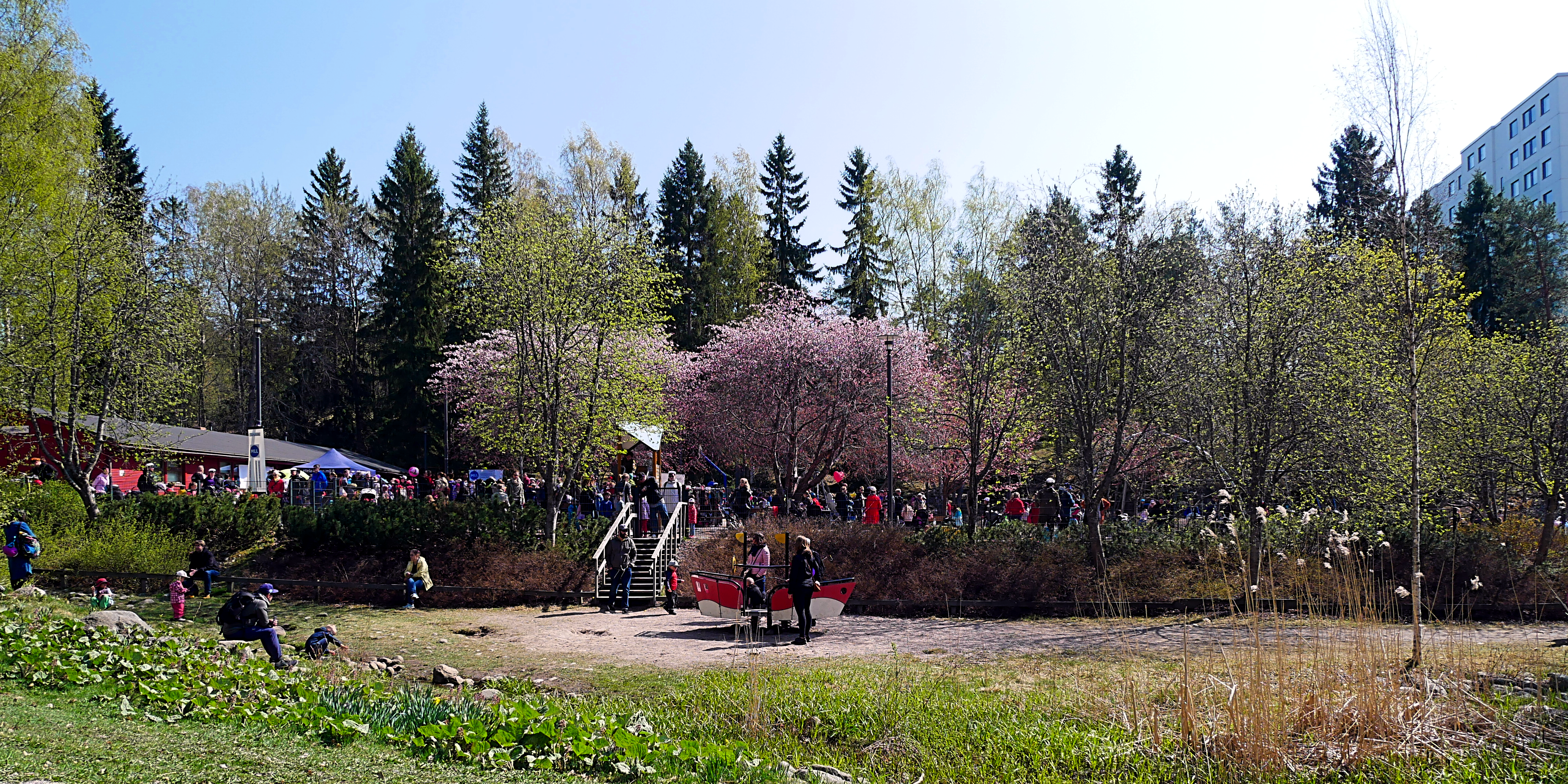
Spring: May Day celebrations in the Puropuisto park in Soukka

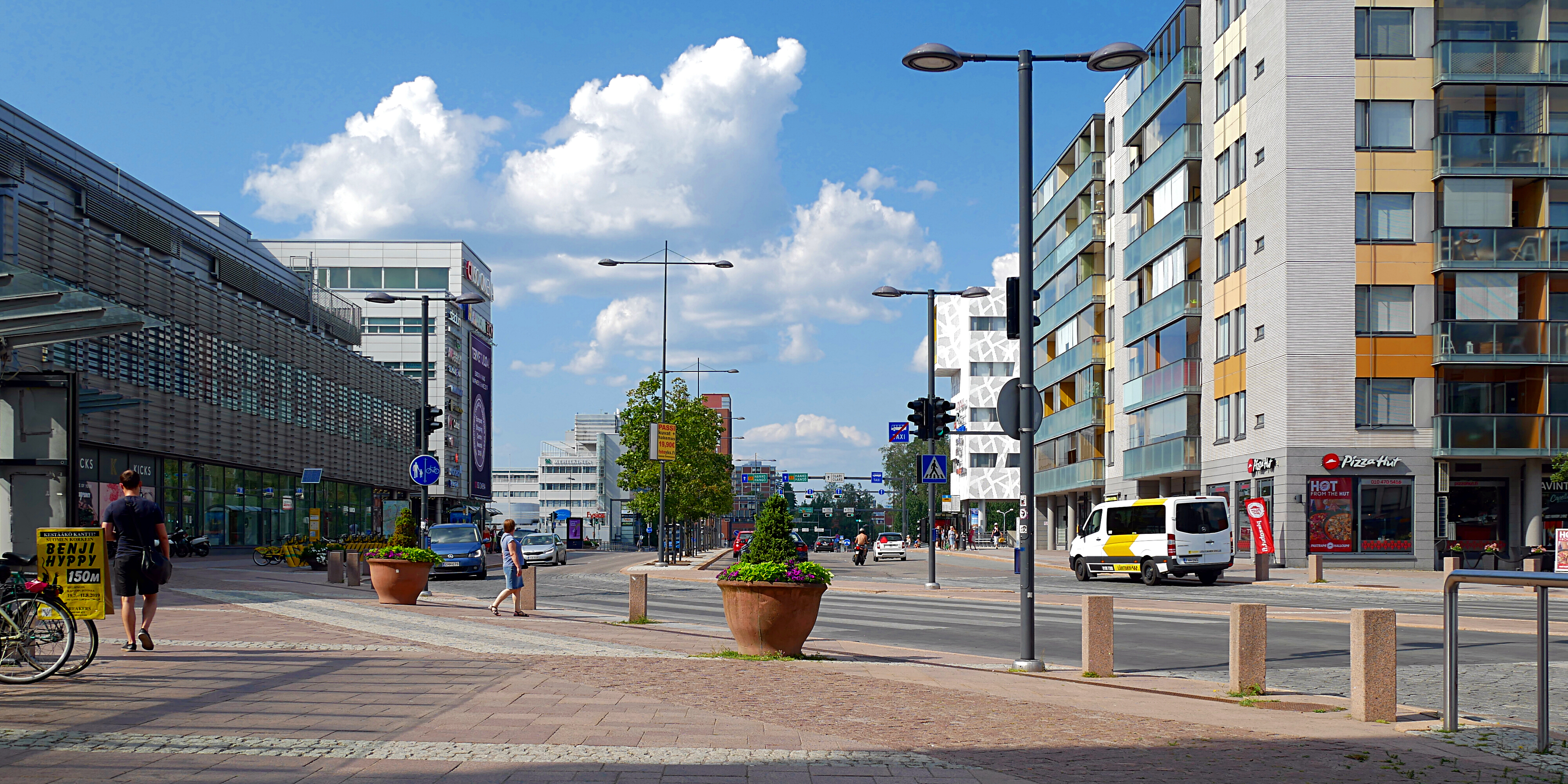
Summer: Piispansilta in Matinkylä

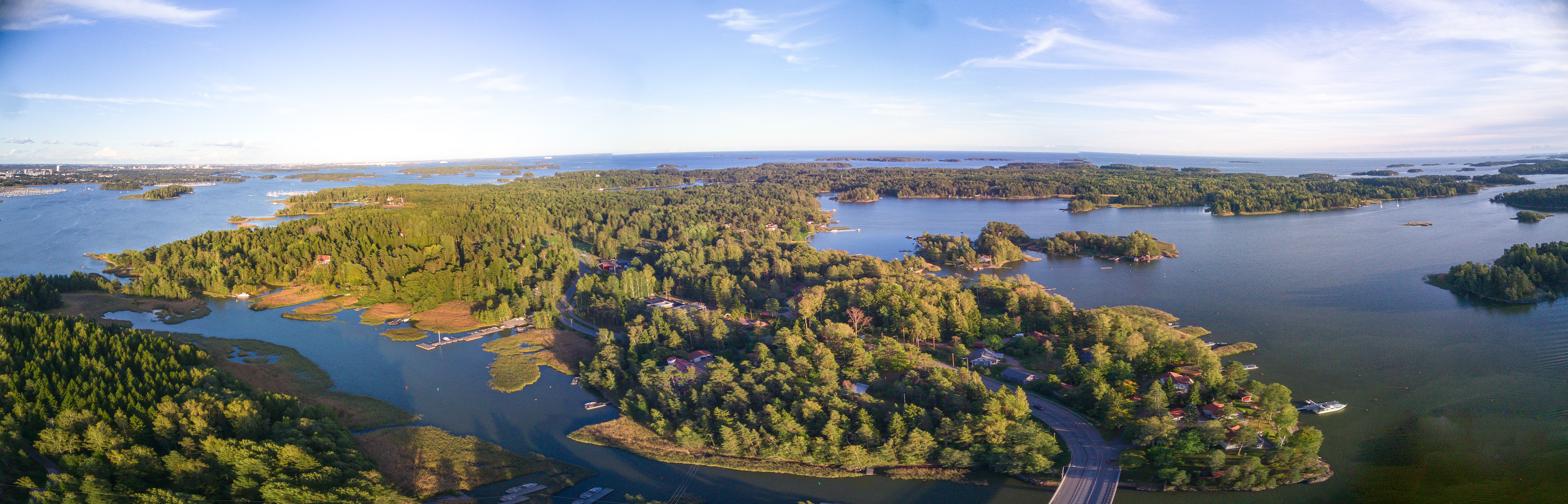
Autumn: Suvisaaristo viewed from the north

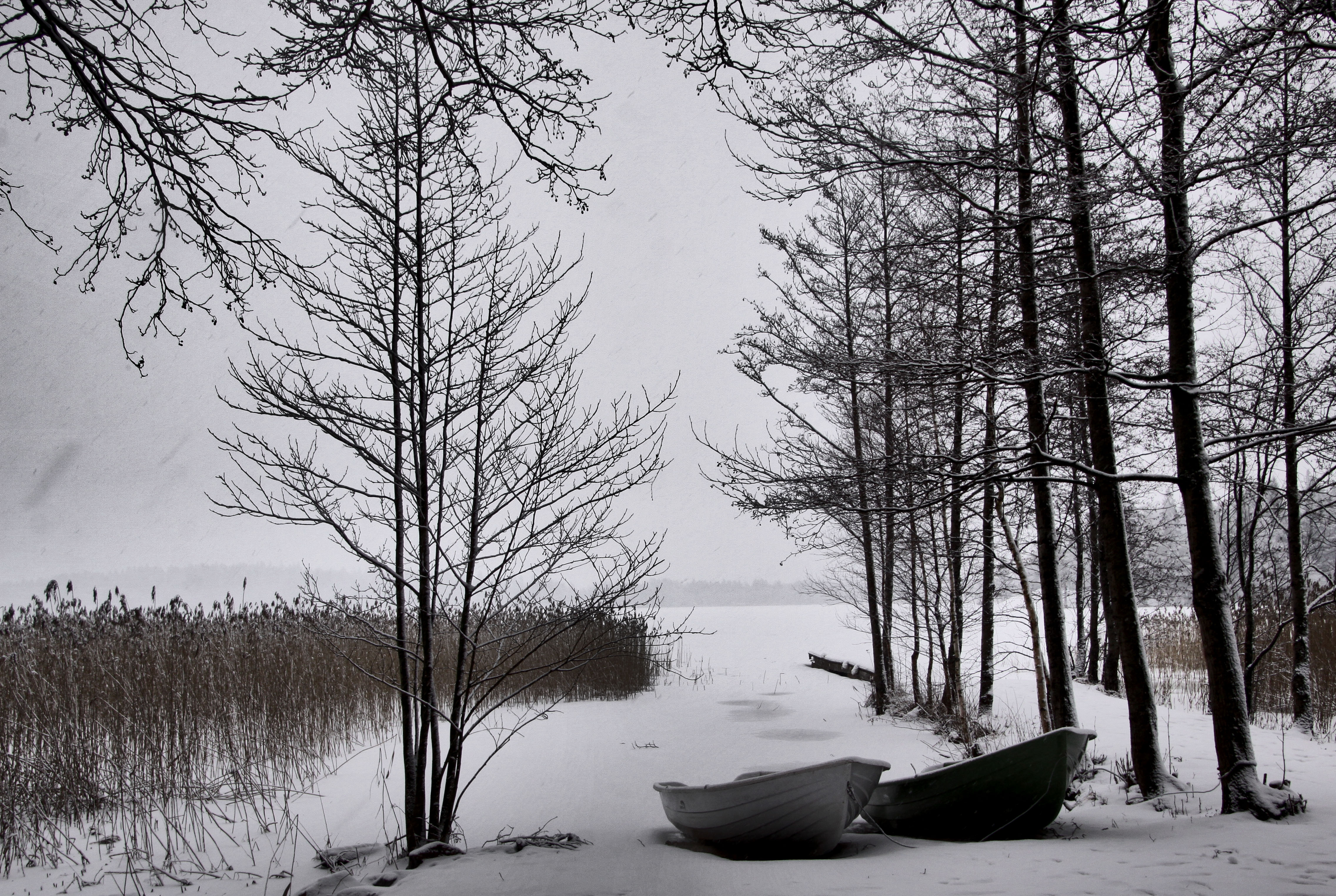
Winter: Boats on the shore of Lake Bodom

Espoo's location in the northern latitudes between the large continent of Eurasia and the even larger Atlantic Ocean causes rapid changes in the weather in Espoo. The height of the terrain from sea level also has an effect on the climate: most of the people in Espoo live south of Lake Bodom, where the terrain only rises higher than 50 m (160 ft) above sea level in a few spots. There are no proper plateaus in northern Espoo either: the terrain rises a bit over 100 m (330 ft) above sea level at the most.

Espoo is located in a hemiboreal zone, also known as the oak zone. The most important factor affecting the environment is the Gulf of Finland, cooling the weather down in summer and warming it up in autumn. The coastal convergence increases rainfall going inward into the mainland. The local climate in Nuuksio is different from the rest of Espoo: the terrain in Nuuksio rises up from almost all directions, which causes a forced rise upwards in air currents, which in turn has an effect on the clouds. The ridge in Nuuksio has the highest rainfall in all of Finland. The climate in Nuuksio is also affected by the fractionate terrain, causing friction increasing rainfall. In 1981, the rainfall in Nupuri was measured as 1,109 mm (43.7 in), an all-time record in Finland. In southern Espoo the area of Suurpelto is slightly cooler than its surroundings.

Although Espoo is the second-largest city in Finland, its meteorological averages have not been measured. At the weather stations in the neighbouring municipalities the average temperature from 1981 to 2010 was about 5 to 6 °C (41 to 43 °F). The coldest time of the year was from January to February and the warmest time was from July to August. The temperature differences between the seasons grow smaller when moving out towards the sea. On the coast and in the archipelago, the temperature rarely rises above 30 °C (86 °F) or falls below −20 °C (−4 °F). The average rainfall is from 600 to 700 mm (24 to 28 in) per year. The driest season is in springtime and the rainiest season is in August and from October to December. Most of the rainy days occur in autumn.

The Finnish Meteorological Institute has eight outposts in Espoo: Friisilä, Kivenlahti, Kytö, Leppävaara, Luukki, Nuuksio, Otaniemi and Tapiola. Of these, Nuuksio and Tapiola are weather outposts, brought online in the 2010s. The Nuuksio outpost is located in a sparsely populated and fractionate lake ridge 90 m (300 ft) above sea level. The Tapiola outpost is located in a suburb on the coast of the Gulf of Finland 6 m (20 ft) above sea level.

Climate data for Espoo (extremes 1968–1979, 2005–present)
Month	Jan	Feb	Mar	Apr	May	Jun	Jul	Aug	Sep	Oct	Nov	Dec	Year
Record high °C (°F)	8.6 (47.5)	8.5 (47.3)	16.3 (61.3)	21.5 (70.7)	29.2 (84.6)	32.4 (90.3)	32.9 (91.2)	31.6 (88.9)	26.2 (79.2)	18.6 (65.5)	14.3 (57.7)	11.0 (51.8)	32.9 (91.2)
Mean daily maximum °C (°F)	−2.3 (27.9)	−2.2 (28.0)	1.6 (34.9)	7.8 (46.0)	14.2 (57.6)	18.5 (65.3)	21.5 (70.7)	20.2 (68.4)	15.2 (59.4)	8.7 (47.7)	3.8 (38.8)	0.2 (32.4)	8.9 (48.1)
Daily mean °C (°F)	−4.3 (24.3)	−4.4 (24.1)	−1.5 (29.3)	4.1 (39.4)	10.3 (50.5)	14.9 (58.8)	18.0 (64.4)	16.7 (62.1)	12.1 (53.8)	6.4 (43.5)	2.3 (36.1)	−1.5 (29.3)	6.1 (43.0)
Mean daily minimum °C (°F)	−6.5 (20.3)	−6.9 (19.6)	−4.8 (23.4)	0.4 (32.7)	5.8 (42.4)	10.6 (51.1)	14.0 (57.2)	12.9 (55.2)	8.9 (48.0)	4.1 (39.4)	0.6 (33.1)	−3.4 (25.9)	3.0 (37.4)
Record low °C (°F)	−30.4 (−22.7)	−31.5 (−24.7)	−25.2 (−13.4)	−10.0 (14.0)	−5.9 (21.4)	−1.6 (29.1)	3.6 (38.5)	−0.4 (31.3)	−7.4 (18.7)	−8.9 (16.0)	−16.9 (1.6)	−32.0 (−25.6)	−32.0 (−25.6)
Average precipitation mm (inches)	53.2 (2.09)	43.6 (1.72)	35.6 (1.40)	33.6 (1.32)	46.9 (1.85)	63.3 (2.49)	72.4 (2.85)	74.3 (2.93)	58.0 (2.28)	61.9 (2.44)	60.1 (2.37)	56.9 (2.24)	659.8 (25.98)
Source 1: Record highs and lows (data from Otaniemi, Nupuri, Sepänkylä, Nuuksio and Tapiola)
Source 2: Weather.Directory

=== Snow conditions ===
On average, snow first falls on Espoo after Christmas and melts away from late March to early April. The snow conditions vary more on the coast than inland. In some years, the snow may last up to five months, while in other years, there might be hardly any snow during the entire winter. Lows coming from the southwest carry temperate air which can keep the snow layers thin or even melt the snow away.

=== Winds ===
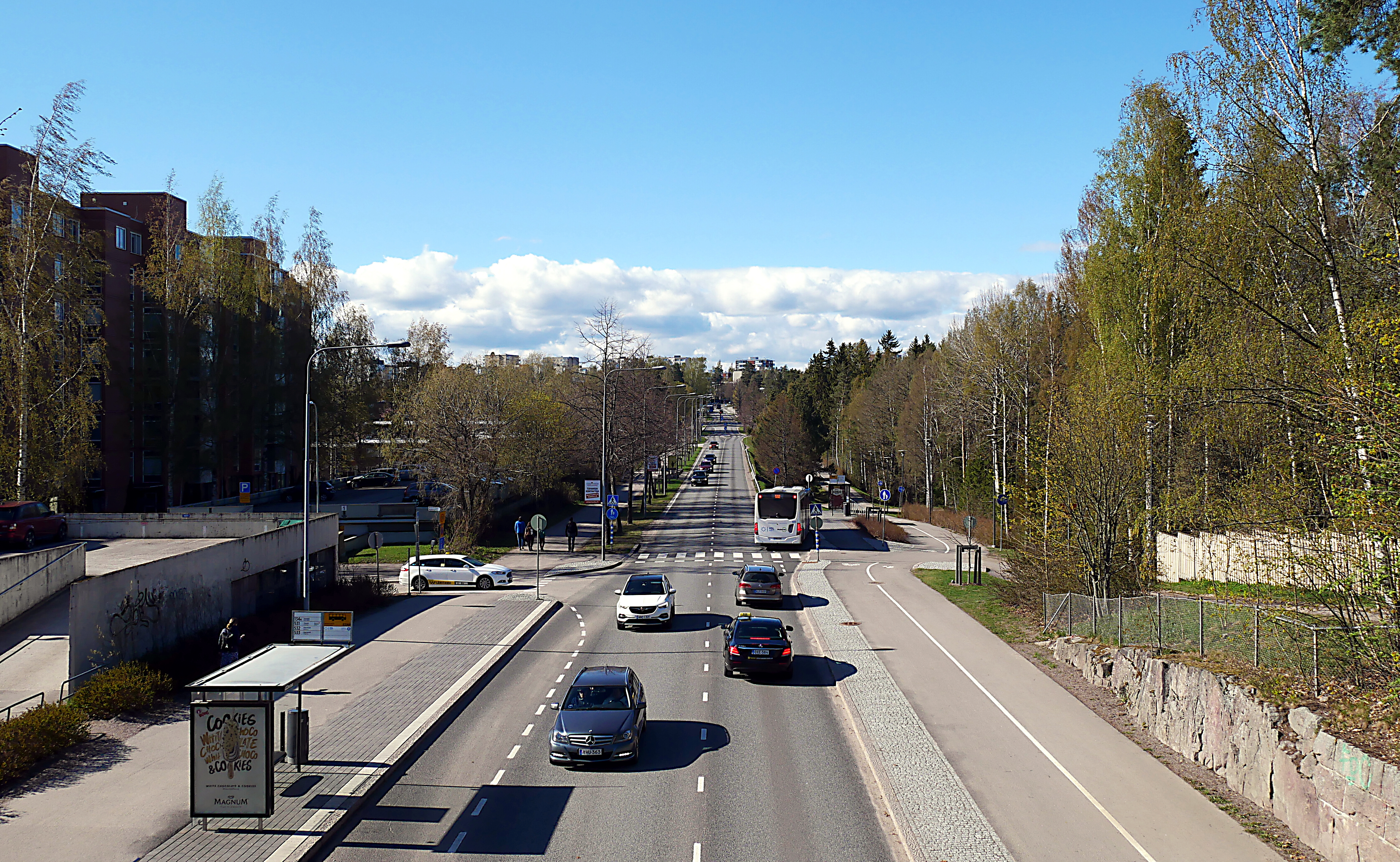
Especially in springtime, the sea wind blows clouds inland. This picture shows a view of the street Olarinkatu to the north. Birch trees usually grow dogears around May Day.

The dominant wind direction sector in Espoo is south-west, as with Finland in general. The sea wind has a large effect on the local winds on the coast, and can even create its own wind field. It can change the direction and speed of the basic wind on the coast for many times during the same day. Particularly in springtime and early summertime the sea wind keeps the archipelago and coastline free of clouds, while there is a white cloud wall further inland, which can cause rain showers.

=== Air quality ===
The air quality in Espoo is considerably good despite the negative effect of the traffic. Particularly on pedestrian roads, sand is used to combat slipperiness, which causes a major dust problem in springtime. Studded tires also contribute to the number of harmful particles. The air quality in Espoo is measured in Leppävaara and Luukki. There are also mobile measurement stations. Alder and birch pollen has a harmful effect on the air quality in springtime, hay and mugwort in summertime.

=== Lighting conditions ===
Espoo is located at a latitude of 60° North, which causes the duration of daylight to vary considerably. At summer solstice daylight lasts for nineteen hours, while at winter solstice it only lasts for six hours. The angle of the sun is at its highest at 53.4° in summertime and only at 6.6° in wintertime. Espoo is among the northernmost places to have nautical dusk even at summer solstice, meaning the sun is at least six degrees below the horizon at the darkest hour of the night. At that time, the entire night passes without total darkness. In contrast, daylight at winter solstice is short, especially when there are only few sunny hours from November to January.

Shadows cast by buildings are long even at summertime. They are at their shortest at summer solstice, about 75 percent of the height of the buildings. For example, the shadow of Niittyhuippu is 63 m (207 ft) long at the time. At noon at winter solstice the shadows can be up to 8.8 times the height of the entire building. For example, the shadow of the Tapiola Central Tower is 430 m (1,410 ft) long at the time.

The official time in Espoo is measured by the 30th eastern meridian. The city is located over five degrees west of it, so the solar noon occurs over 20 minutes later than on the 30th meridian.

=== Growth season ===
Espoo is located at the plant success zone 1b. The thermal growth season lasts for a bit over half a year on average. In general, the growth season starts in April and ends in October. Sometimes it continues to early November. The sum of the effective temperature during the thermal growth season is over 1,400 °C (2,550 °F) times day, and annual variations are large.

== Administration ==
Espoo belongs to the region of Uusimaa. Supreme decision-making power in the city is held by the City Council of Espoo. The council has 75 members, elected for a period of four years.

=== Subdivisions ===
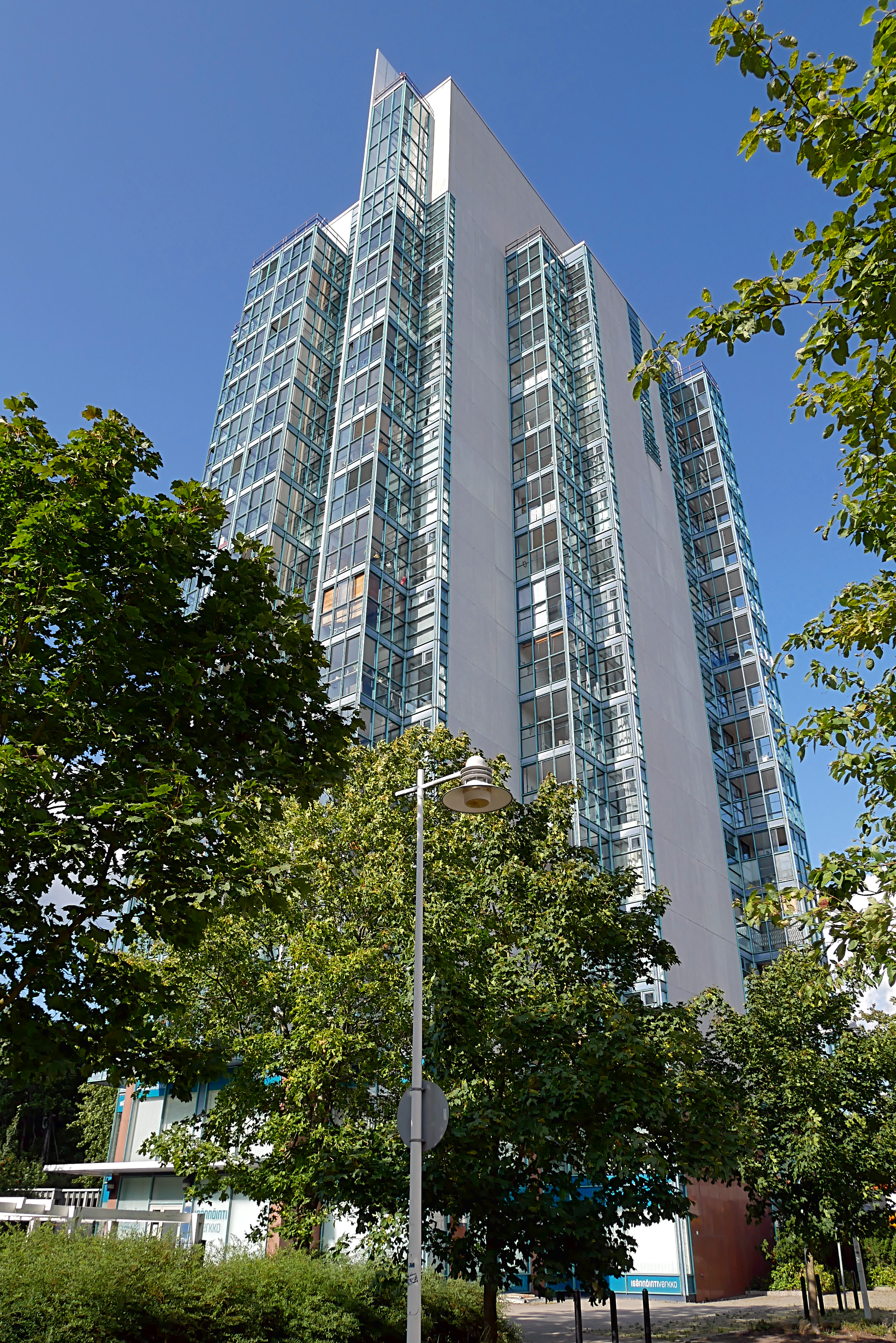
A high-rise building in Kivenlahti

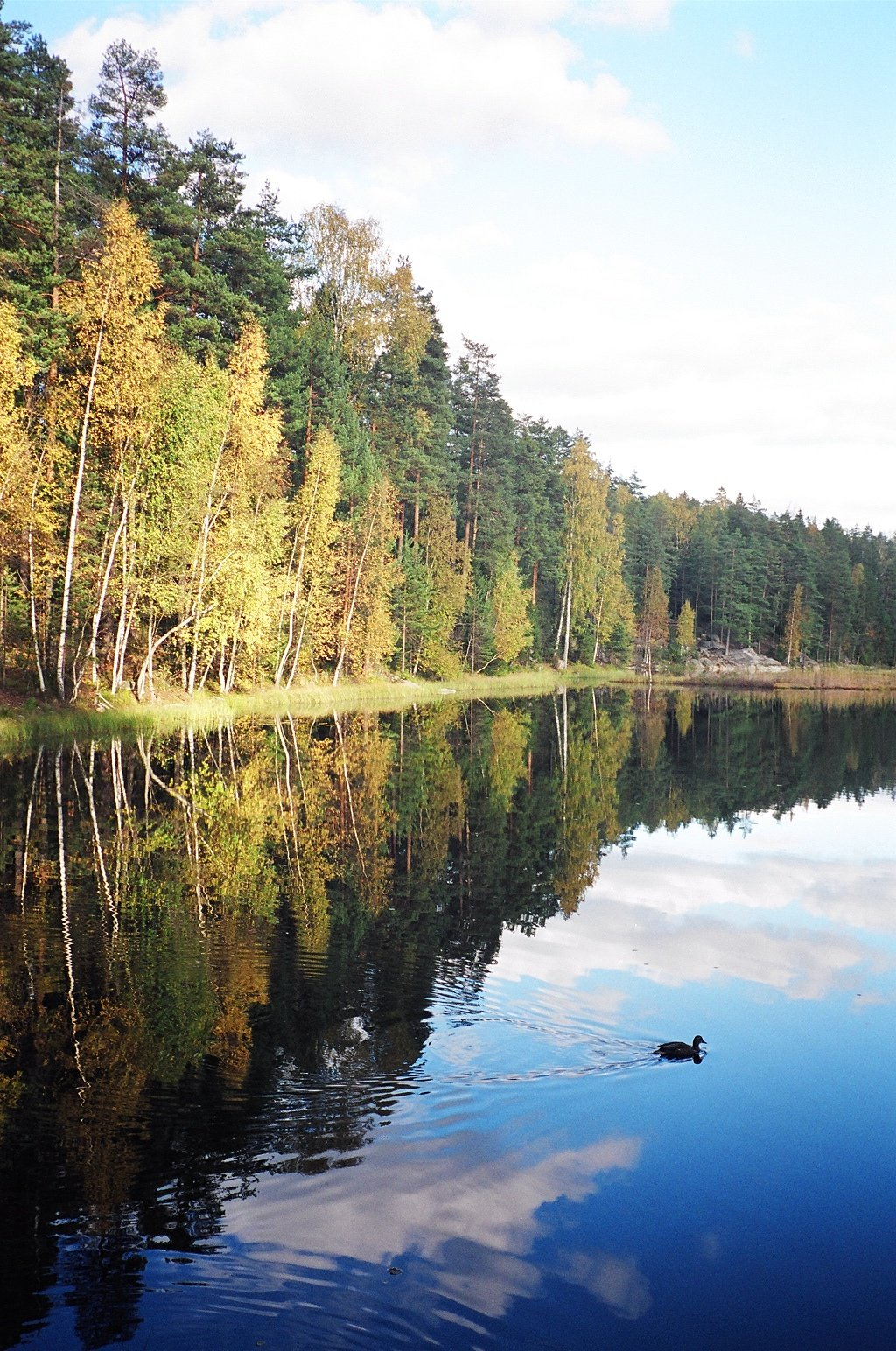
Nuuksio National Park in autumn

Espoo is divided into seven major areas (Finnish: suuralueet, Swedish: storområden): Vanha-Espoo (with administrative center), Suur-Espoonlahti, Pohjois-Espoo, Suur-Kauklahti, Suur-Leppävaara, Suur-Matinkylä, and Suur-Tapiola of which Suur-Leppävaara has the highest population. These major areas are then divided into a total of 56 districts. The healthcare, social, cultural and school services of the city have been concentrated to the regional centres in the major areas.

Statistics about Espoo also include the division "other", which included 4,582 people on New Year 2022. From 2011 to 2022 the population growth was the highest in Suur-Kauklahti, about 70%. The growth in Suur-Matinkylä was about 27%, while Suur-Tapiola and Suur-Leppävaara grew by about 20%. The population in Suur-Espoonlahti and Vanha-Espoo grew by about 12% to 13% and that in Pohjois-Espoo by about 10%.

The postal codes in Espoo start with the digits "02", like in Kauniainen, Kirkkonummi and Siuntio as well. Espoo includes the postal codes 02100 to 02380, 02600 to 02860 (excluding 02700 Kauniainen) and 02920 to 02980. The lowest postal codes are located in the south and the highest ones in the north.

=== Municipal annexations ===
In connection to the municipal renewal plan in Finland there have been suggestions to annex Espoo into the rest of the Finnish capital region, together with some of the surrounding municipalities. So far the City Council of Espoo has strongly opposed these suggestions.

=== Organisation ===
The city of Espoo has three industries and one result area.

- Result area of vitality. Led by Mervi Heinaro.
- Industry of growth and education. Led by Harri Rinta-Aho.
- Industry of welfare. Led by Sanna Svahn.
- Industry of technology and the environment. Led by Olli Isotalo.

=== City and municipal managers ===
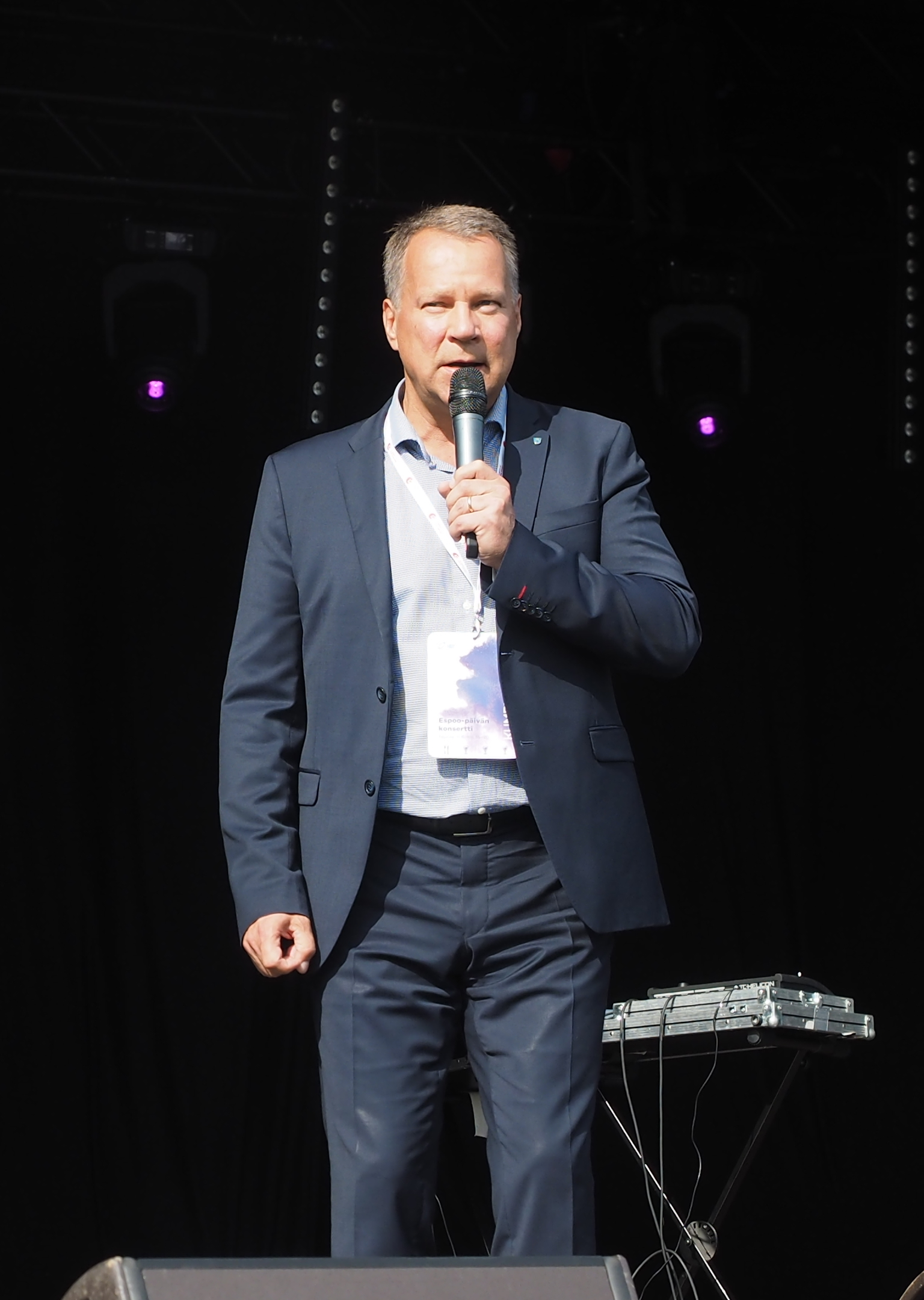
Jukka Mäkelä, the city manager of Espoo, at Espoo Day 2019

The office of a municipal manager was introduced to the rural municipalities in Finland through the 1948 municipal law, but in Espoo this office was only first fulfilled in 1962, one year before Espoo became a market town. Before this, the duties of the municipal manager were handled by the speaker of the municipal council.

Municipal managers of Espoo include:

- Arvi E. Heiskanen 1962–1963
- Teppo Tiihonen 1963–1985
- Pekka Löyttyniemi 1985–1995
- Marketta Kokkonen 1995–2010
- Jukka Mäkelä 2011–2025
- Kai Mykkänen 2025–present

=== City Council ===
Politically, Espoo is a clearly bourgeois city, with the largest party being the National Coalition Party. Support of the Green League and the Swedish People's Party of Finland is also larger in Espoo than the average of Finland. The parties with the largest increase in support in the 2010s were the Green League and Movement Now.

== Demographics ==
Historical population
Year	Pop.	±% p.a.
1694 (Note: According to a census taken in 1694, there were 817 people subject to a poll tax in the parish of Espoo. A widely used method to estimate the whole population is to add 10% to the given amount and multiply it by two, which amounts to approximately 1,800.)	1,800	—
1721 (Note: The population is estimated to have fallen drastically due to the Great Famine of 1695–1697 and the Russian occupation in 1713–1721.)	1,500	−0.67%
1749	1,900	+0.85%
1825	3,600	+0.84%
1865	4,000	+0.26%
1901	5,888	+1.08%
1910	7,891	+3.31%
1920	8,817	+1.12%
1930	11,370	+2.58%
1940	13,378	+1.64%
1950	25,222	+6.55%
1960	56,641	+8.43%
1970	96,609	+5.48%
1980	137,409	+3.59%
1990	172,629	+2.31%
2000	213,271	+2.14%
2010	247,970	+1.52%
2020	292,796	+1.68%
2025	325,716	+2.15%
Source: 1694–1865, Doria (1950-1970), Statistics Finland (1980–2025)

The city of Espoo has 325,716 inhabitants, making it the second most populous municipality in Finland. The city of Espoo is part of the Helsinki metropolitan area, which is the largest urban area in Finland with 1,623,283 inhabitants. The city is home to 5% of Finland's population. In Espoo, 22% of the population has a foreign background, almost three times the national average.

The city is the 7th most densely populated in Finland. In 2022, the average age of people in Espoo was 39.0 years, lower than the average age in Finland (43.7 years). In 2021, the population of Espoo had the second highest average income in Finland after Kauniainen.

=== Language ===
Population by
mother tongue (2025)
1. Finnish (68.0%)
2. Swedish (6.20%)
3. Russian (3.50%)
4. Arabic (2.00%)
5. English (1.80%)
6. Estonian (1.70%)
7. Chinese (1.50%)
8. Other (15.3%)

The city of Espoo is officially bilingual, with both Finnish and Swedish as official languages. The majority of the population, 221,335 persons (68.0%), spoke Finnish as their first language. The number of Swedish speakers was 20,146 persons (6.2%) of the population. Foreign languages were spoken by 25.9% of the population. As English and Swedish are compulsory school subjects, functional bilingualism or trilingualism acquired through language studies is not uncommon.

The proportion of Swedish speakers decreased the most in the 1950s: in the 1950s, Swedish speakers accounted for 43.1% of the population (about 10,800 people), while in 1960 they accounted for 23.5% (about 13,300 people), due to rapid urbanisation, which led to strong positive immigration of Finnish speakers from other parts of the country.

The number of Swedish speakers increased slowly until the 2010s, when they numbered about 20,300, while the proportion decreased year by year. In 1996 the proportion fell below 10 per cent. As of 2025, the proportion of Swedish speakers in Espoo was 6.2% of the population. In absolute terms, Espoo was the second most Swedish-speaking municipality in Finland after Helsinki, ahead of Raseborg, Vaasa, Porvoo and Korsholm.

In 2018, the largest proportions of Swedish speakers in Espoo were in Suvisaaristo (33.6%), Espoonkartano (29.9%), Sepänkylä (24.1%) and Bodom (21.3%). In absolute terms, the most Swedish speakers lived in Haukilahti (993 people) and Matinkylä (813 people).

The proportion of Finnish speakers has declined significantly over the past three decades. In 1999, the proportion of Finnish speakers was 88%, and in 2024 it was 68.7%. At the same time, the proportion of foreign language speakers has increased dramatically: in 1999 it was only about 4%, and in 2024 it was 25,0%. The foreign language speakers in Espoo are a heterogeneous group divided into tens of different languages, of which the Russian speakers form the largest part.

=== Immigration ===
Population by country of birth (2025)
Country of birth	Population	%
Finland	251,605	77.2
Soviet Union	7,014	2.2
Estonia	5,338	1.6
India	5,326	1.6
China	4,308	1.3
Iraq	3,440	1.1
Philippines	3,135	1.0
Russia	2,995	0.9
Iran	2,610	0.8
Pakistan	2,060	0.6
Other	38,885	11.9

As of 2024, there were 80,691 people with an immigrant background living in Espoo, or 25% of the population. (Note: Statistics Finland classifies a person as having a "foreign background" if both parents or the only known parent were born abroad.) There were 70,918 residents who were born abroad, or 22% of the population. The number of foreign citizens in Espoo was 49,245.

The relative share of immigrants in Espoo's population is almost three times higher than the national average. Moreover, the city's new residents are increasingly of foreign origin. This will increase the proportion of foreign residents in the coming years.

The largest groups are from the former Soviet Union, Estonia, India, China, Iraq and Serbia. The number of people from India has increased sharply in recent years, especially in the areas of Olari and Suurpelto.

=== Religion ===
In 2023, the Evangelical Lutheran Church was the largest religious group with 50.3% of the population of Espoo. Other religious groups accounted for 3.8% of the population. 45.9% of the population had no religious affiliation.

According to the 2018 division Espoo is home to the following Evangelical Lutheran congregations:

- Espoonlahti congregation (formerly known as the Kivenlahti congregation)
- Espoo cathedral congregation (formerly known as the Kanta-Espoo congregation)
- Leppävaara congregation
- Olari congregation
- Tapiola congregation
- Espoo Swedish congregation

Together these congregations form the Espoo Congregation Union (Finnish: Espoon seurakuntayhtymä, Swedish: Esbo kyrkliga samfällighet).

In 2003, of the population of Espoo, 1.2 percent belonged to the Orthodox Church of Finland, 0.4 percent were Catholic and 0.2 percent were Jehovah's Witnesses. Members of the Evangelical Free Church of Finland, Mormons, Jews, Muslims, other Orthodox and Methodists amounted to 0.1 percent each.

There are five Lutheran churches in Espoo (each Finnish-speaking congregation has one), including the Espoo Cathedral, the Espoonlahti Church, the Olari Church, the Tapiola Church and the Leppävaara Church. There are also 27 chapels of the Lutheran Church in Espoo.

Of the Orthodox congregations in Finland, the Helsinki Orthodox Congregation is active in Espoo. It has the Church of the Sanctifier Herman of Alaska in Tapiola.

Of the congregations of the Pentecostal Church of Finland, the Pentecostal Congregation of Espoo is active in Espoo. Individual Pentecostal congregations in Espoo include the Espoonlahti Pentecostal congregation, the Keski-Espoo near congregation, the Leppävaara Missionary chapel and Mankby bibliska församling. Of the congregations of the Evangelical Free Church of Finland, the Espoo free congregation is active in Espoo.

== Economy ==
=== Economic history ===
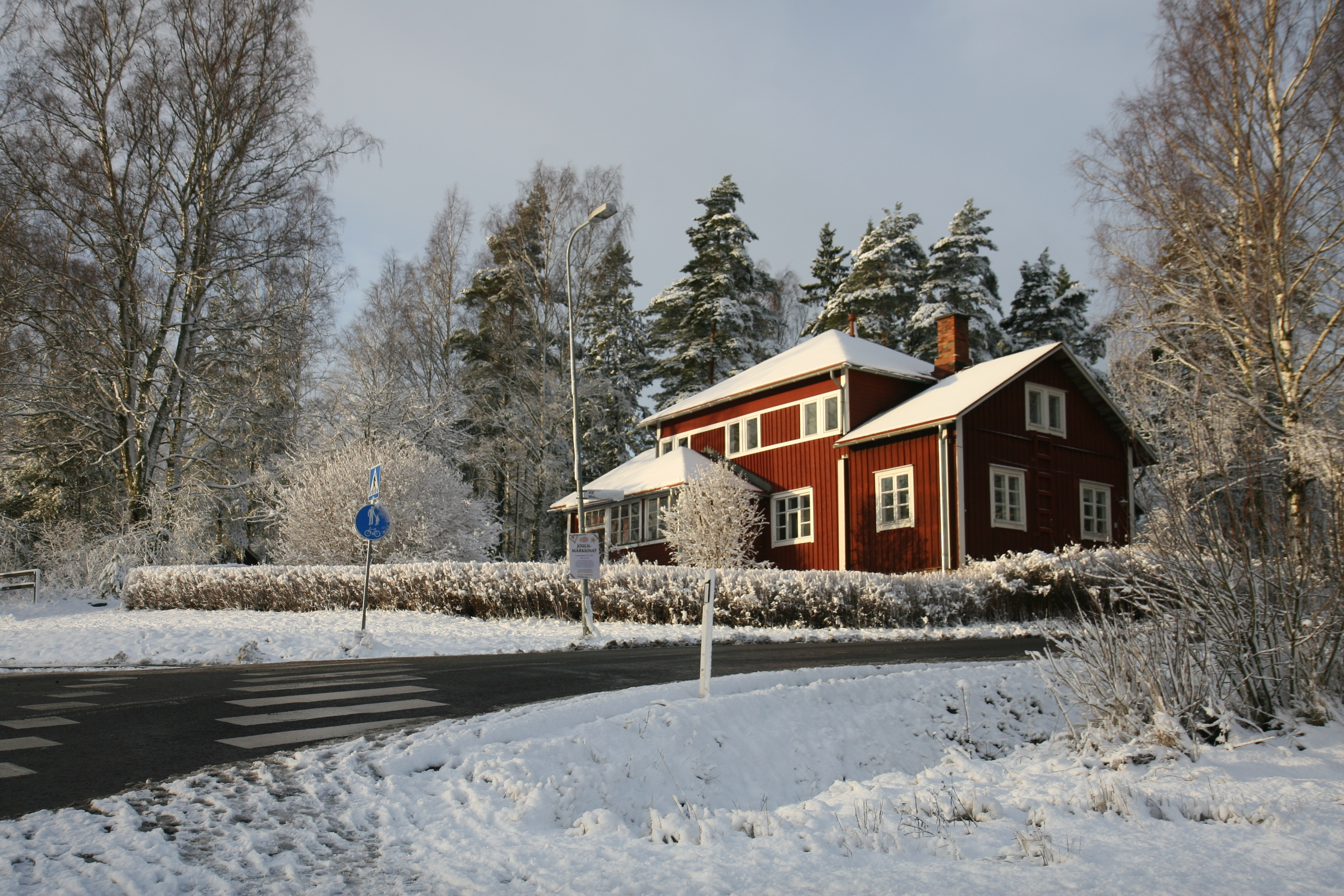
In addition to fields, many buildings remain of rural Espoo, such as the Punainen tupa ("red house") in Henttaa.

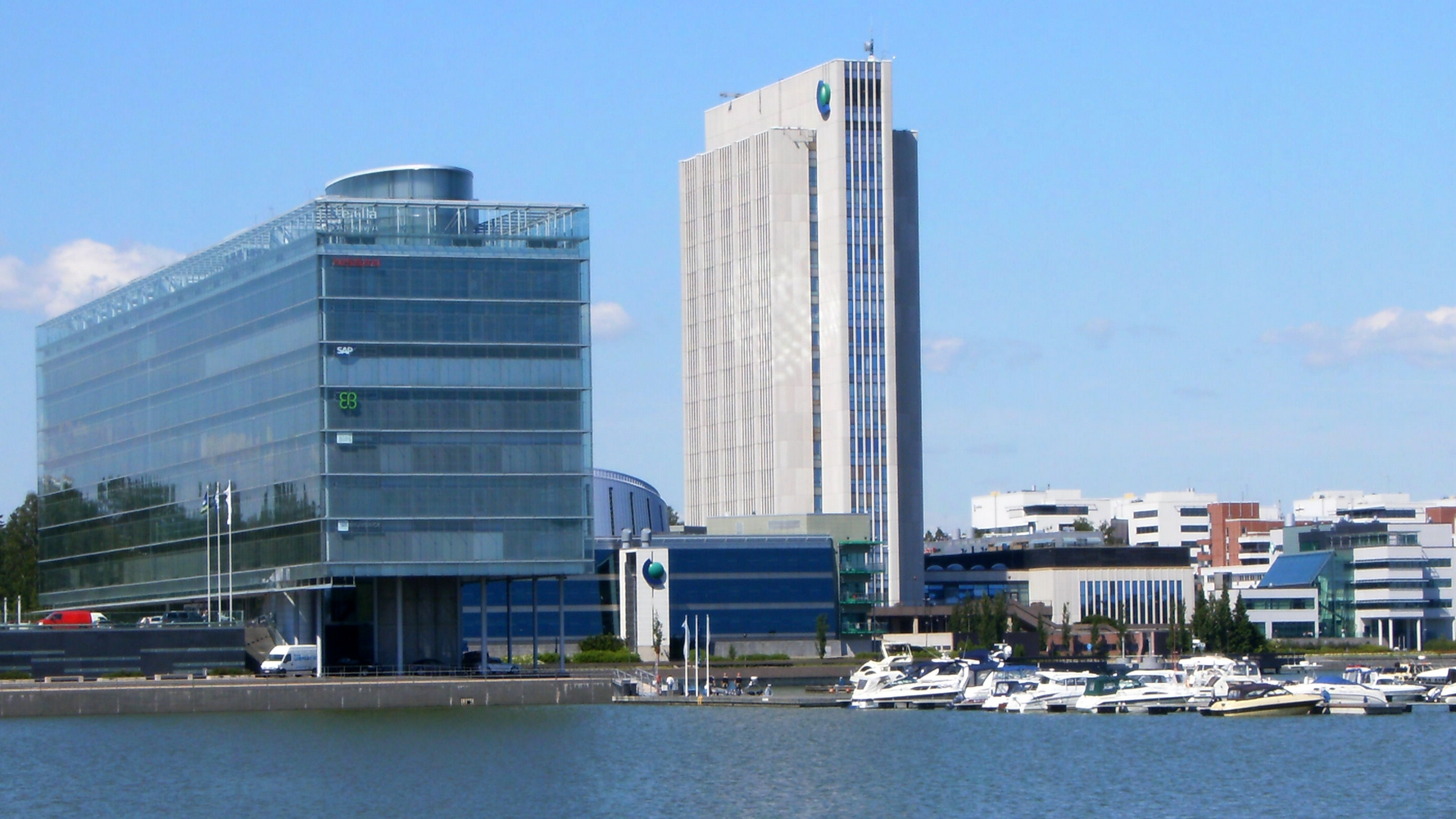
Office buildings in Keilaniemi

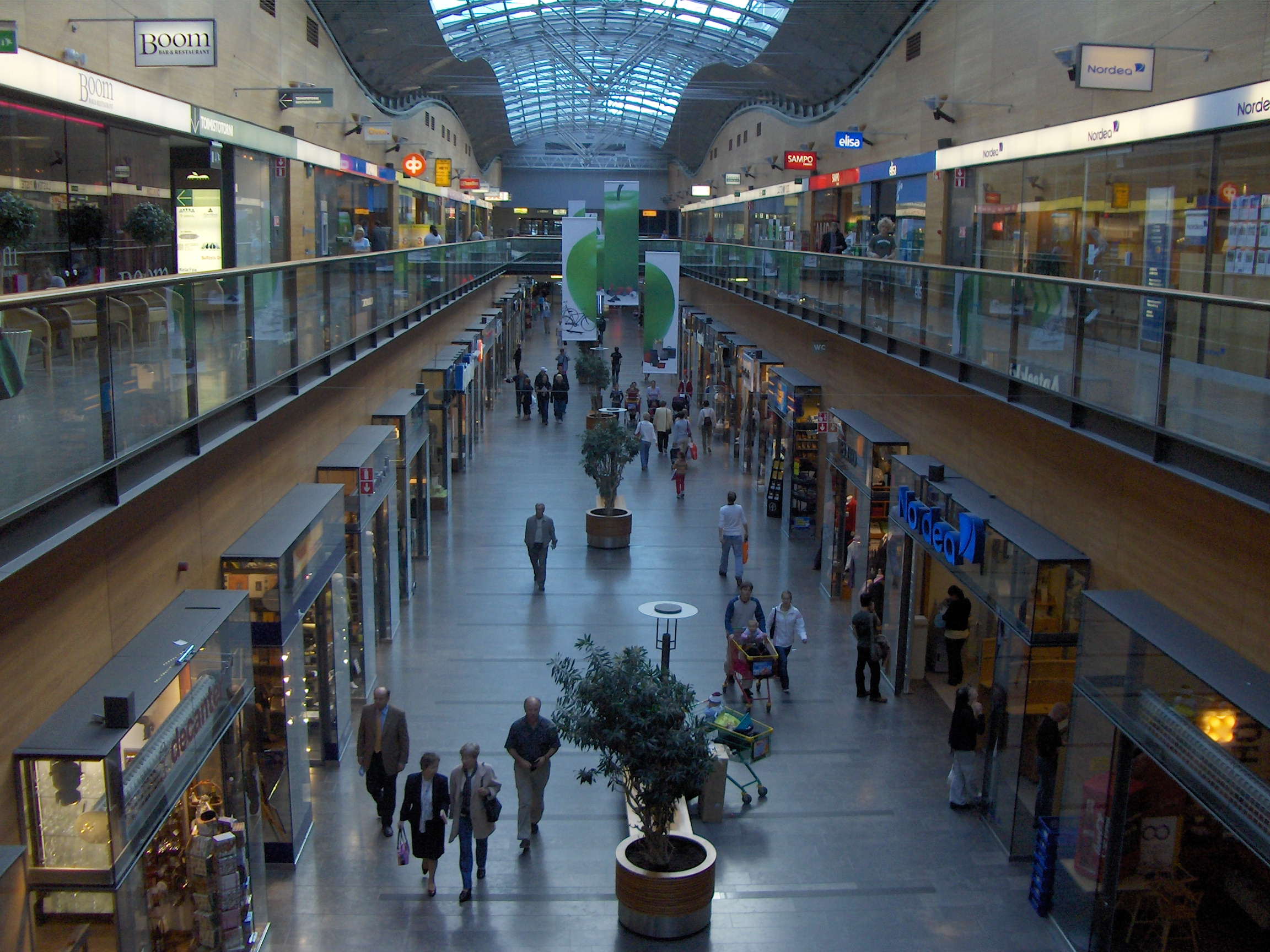
The shopping centre Iso Omena, opened in 2001, is located in Matinkylä near the sea shore.

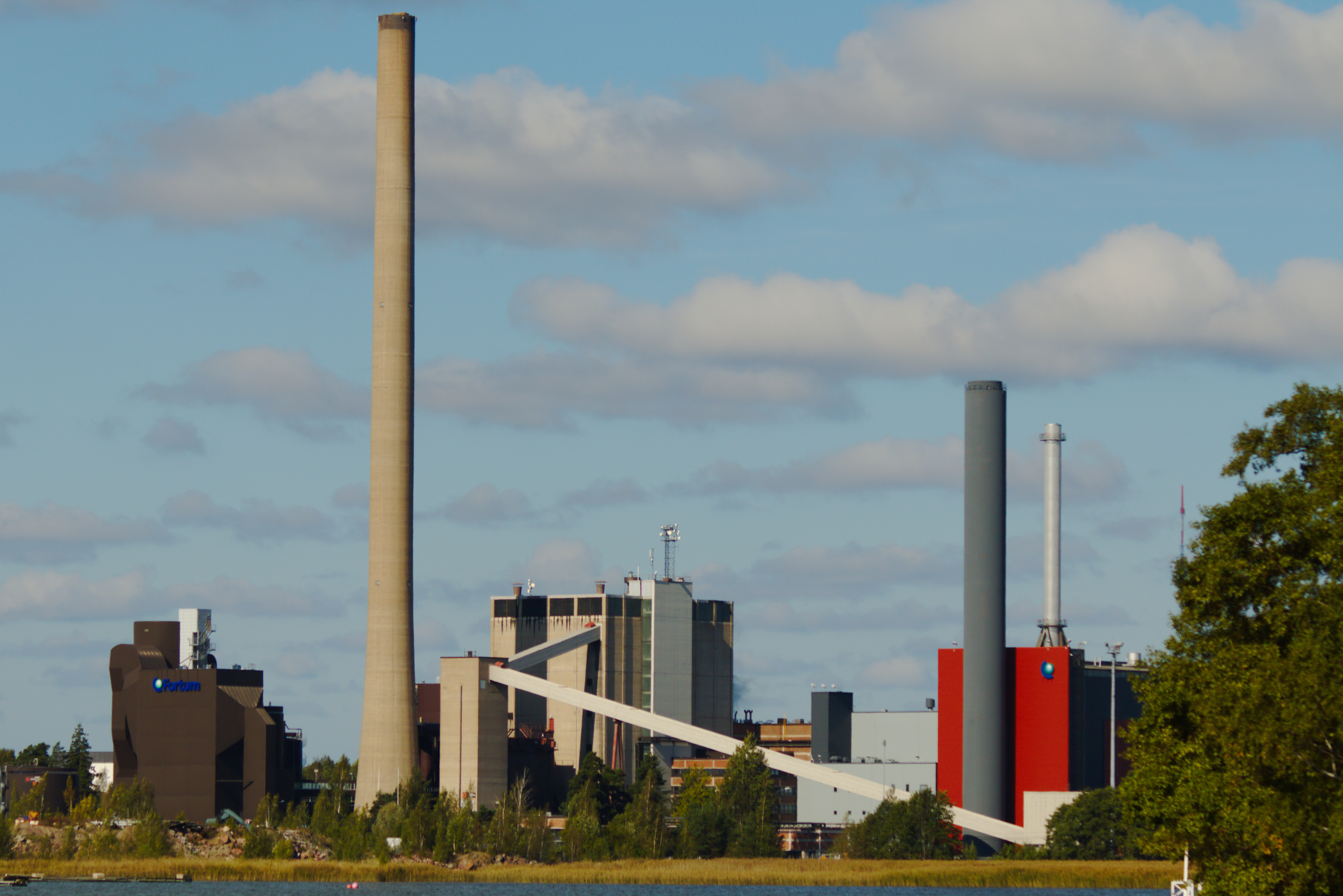
The Suomenoja power plant

Still in the middle 19th century, Espoo was a rural community living in subsistence economy. There was hardly any industry, the villages were small and situated evenly across different parts of the parish. There was some population concentration at the location of the current district of Espoon keskus and along the Suuri Rantatie road, and some dense population on the shore of the Gulf of Finland. In 1865 farming was the primary source of income for about 90% of the men in Espoo. There were about seventy craftsmen and about twenty people working in the industry. Of the women in Espoo, over one fifth worked as maids.

The economical history of 19th-century Espoo also includes some small-scale mining activity. There was ore mining at the lands of the Kilo mansion around 1840, and this activity continued to the 1850s. The ore was of good quality but poor, and the ore streaks were fragmentary. In the end, the amount of ore mined from Kilo was very small. A new discovery of ore was made at the lands of the Alberga manor in the early 1840s. At most seven people worked at the site, but the amount of ore mined in Alberga ended up very small as well. The mining activity slowly waned and stopped completely in 1851.

The Espoo parish was not a neighbour of the city of Helsinki in the 19th century – there were lands of the Helsinki parish in between. The rapid growth of Helsinki attracted people from Espoo: despite the short distance, travel between Espoo and Helsinki was so slow, that moving into Helsinki was almost unavoidable if one happened to get a job there.

The rapid growth of Helsinki started also showing outside the administrative borders of the city. The first industrial area in Espoo was born near the shore of the Espoonlahti bay. In the late 19th century there were three brick factories and a steam-powered sawmill in the area. Clay from the Espoonlahti bay was well suited for making bricks, and the bricks were easy to transport to Helsinki over sea. For example, the Uspenski Cathedral in Katajanokka has been built from bricks from the Stensvik brick factory. The village of Mulby (Muulo in Finnish) became the industrial centre of Espoo, and its population grew manifold. Other villages in southwestern Espoo also grew through the industry. When the Rantarata railway was completed in the early 20th century part of the industry moved to the railway track, and the railway also enabled people to commute for work from Espoo to Helsinki.

There was also glass industry in Espoo. Pehr Appelgrén founded a bottle glass factory near the Espoo railway station in 1912. The factory closed down in 1922. The Kauklahti glass factory started in 1923, and by the 1930s it was the largest illumination glass factory in Finland. The factory closed down in 1951. Glass industry in Espoo altogether waned in the 1950s.

By the late 1930s, there were about thirty businesses in Espoo. In addition to glass and brick industry, the parish included machinery workshops, sawmills and metallurgy workshops. There was industrial clothing manufacturing in Kauklahti and a clock factory in Viherlaakso. The steam-powered sawmill in Bastvik, founded in 1876, was economically quite stable; its saw equipment was moved to the Hanko Peninsula in the 20th century. The merchant F. F. Sjöblom founded the first shop in Espoo in Stensvik soon after founding of shops had been liberated in 1868. At the time when Finland became independent, there were about 40 shops in Espoo, most of them general stores.

Despite the increase in industry and service jobs, Espoo was still a predominantly rural parish in 1920. About two thirds of the population got their primary income from farming. Rye and barley had been the primary crops in Espoo for centuries. By the 20th century the significance of cattle herding increased, and the farming of oats became more popular.

Construction and services became the basis of the economy in Espoo in the 1950s, when the rapid growth in population in Espoo started. In the 2010s, the primary industries counting by number of jobs are trade, accommodation and food and beverage industry as well as specialist services. The proportion of information and communications technology is about one tenth. About one sixth of the jobs are in industry and construction. The public sector is large: about one quarter of jobs were in the public sector in the middle 2010s.

The transition from a medieval rural parish into an integral part of the Helsinki metropolitan area has dropped the proportion of farming and forestry jobs to about a fifth of a percent.In 2024, Espoo placed second in the European Commission's Capital of Innovation Awards (iCapital), recognised for its collaborative innovation ecosystem and youth-focused initiatives.

=== Companies ===
Espoo is home to the head offices of several global companies and many high technology companies. The Aalto University campus in southeastern Espoo is at the heart of research and development. The head offices of Nokia, Valmet, Remedy Entertainment, Fortum, Neste, Huhtamäki, Metsä Group, Orion Corporation, Oriola, Outotec and LähiTapiola are located in Espoo. Among government enterprises, VTT Technical Research Centre of Finland, Gasum, Neste and Fortum are headquartered in Espoo. Due to the presence of these companies, particularly Nokia, Espoo alone accounts for 60% of patents filed in Finland and ranks #6 among European cities in number of patents filed.

The largest shopping centres in Espoo are Iso Omena, Sello, Lippulaiva, Entresse and Ainoa. Along the continuous traffic route formed by Merituulentie to the north of Länsiväylä, Kuitinmäentie and Martinsillantie are located the shopping centre Niitty, Länsikeskus, the retail park Merituuli, the shopping centre Liila as well as several leisure, indoor decoration and automobile businesses. The small shopping centre Suuris, opened in 2017, is located in Suurpelto along Ring II.

Industrial areas in Espoo include Juvanmalmi, Karamalmi and Kivenlahti.

=== City of Espoo ===
The city of Espoo funds its services mainly by taxation. In 2021 the tax income of the city, consisting of the municipal tax, the communal tax and the property tax, amounted to 1,711 million euro, with the municipal tax rate being 18.00 percent. By number of employees, the city of Espoo is the biggest employer in Espoo: in 2016 it employed about 14 thousand people.

The economy in Espoo leaves a surplus, but this is not enough to finance the investments of the growing city.

Espoo has signed the principles of responsible investment of the United Nations. The city of Espoo has five investment funds: the basic services and land acquisition fund, the development fund of basic services, the development fund of entrepreneurship and employment, the investment fund and the accident fund.

A characteristic feature of Espoo is that the city manages its investments through its daughter companies.

=== Income level ===
The average income level in Espoo is higher than that in the rest of the capital region and particularly higher than that in the rest of Finland. In 2015, the taxable income in Espoo was 40% higher than in the rest of Finland. The unemployment rate in Espoo is high, but still lower than the average in Finland. The highest-income areas in Espoo, such as Westend and Haukilahti, are mainly located on the coast. These districts are part of the Tapiola major district, whose income level is significantly higher than the average in Espoo. The income level in the Matinkylä and Espoonlahti major districts is near the average in Espoo. The income level in the Leppävaara major district and particularly in the Vanha-Espoo major district is lower than the average in Espoo.

The city of Espoo is not particularly segregated by major districts, instead the differences in income are significantly higher within the major districts as between them. In low-income major districts the average income level is near the average in Helsinki. In some areas, such as in Kivenlahti and Suvela, it even falls below the average in Vantaa. Areas consisting of detached houses generally have higher income levels than areas consisting of apartment buildings.

== Culture ==
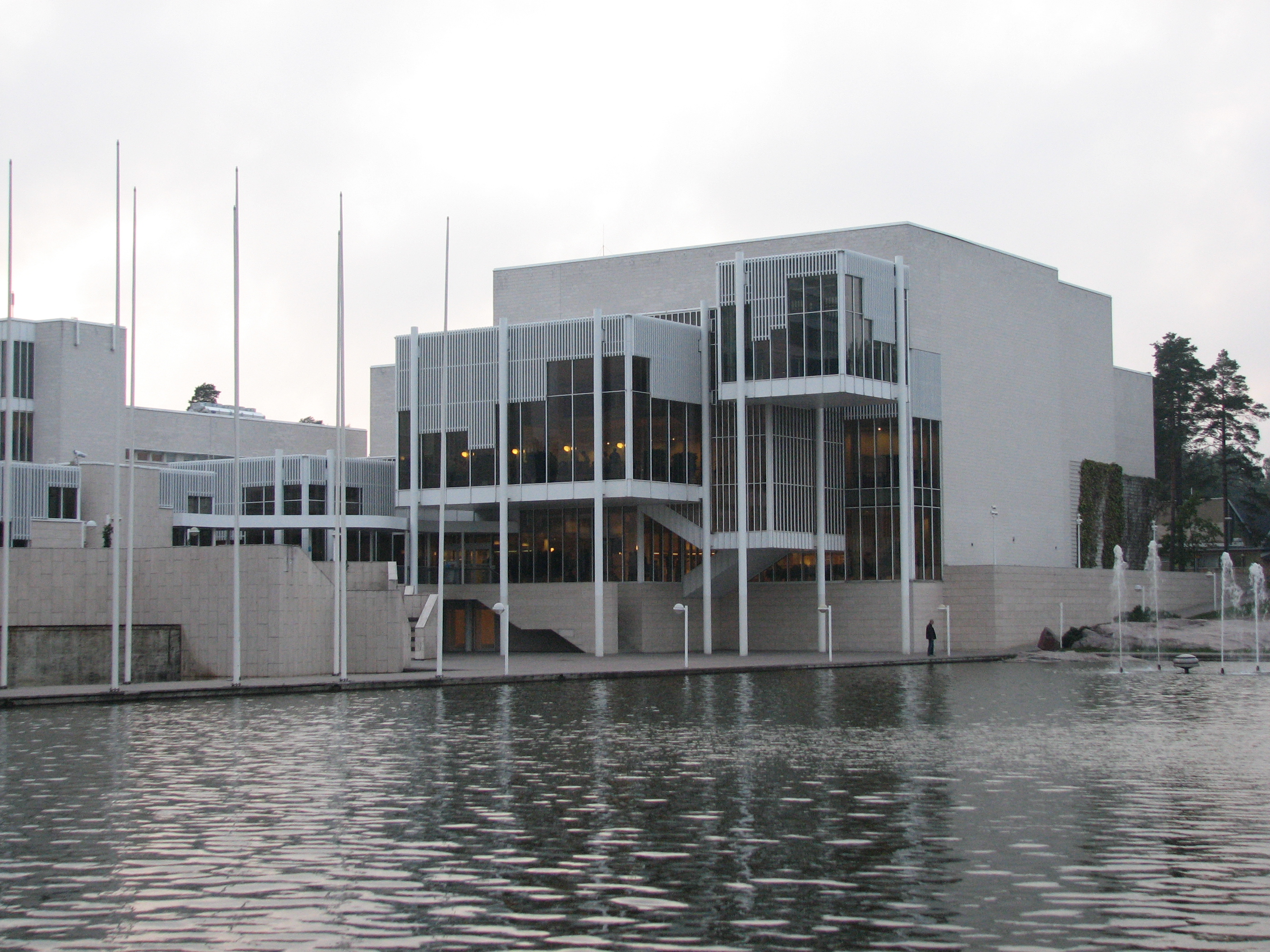
The Espoo Cultural Centre

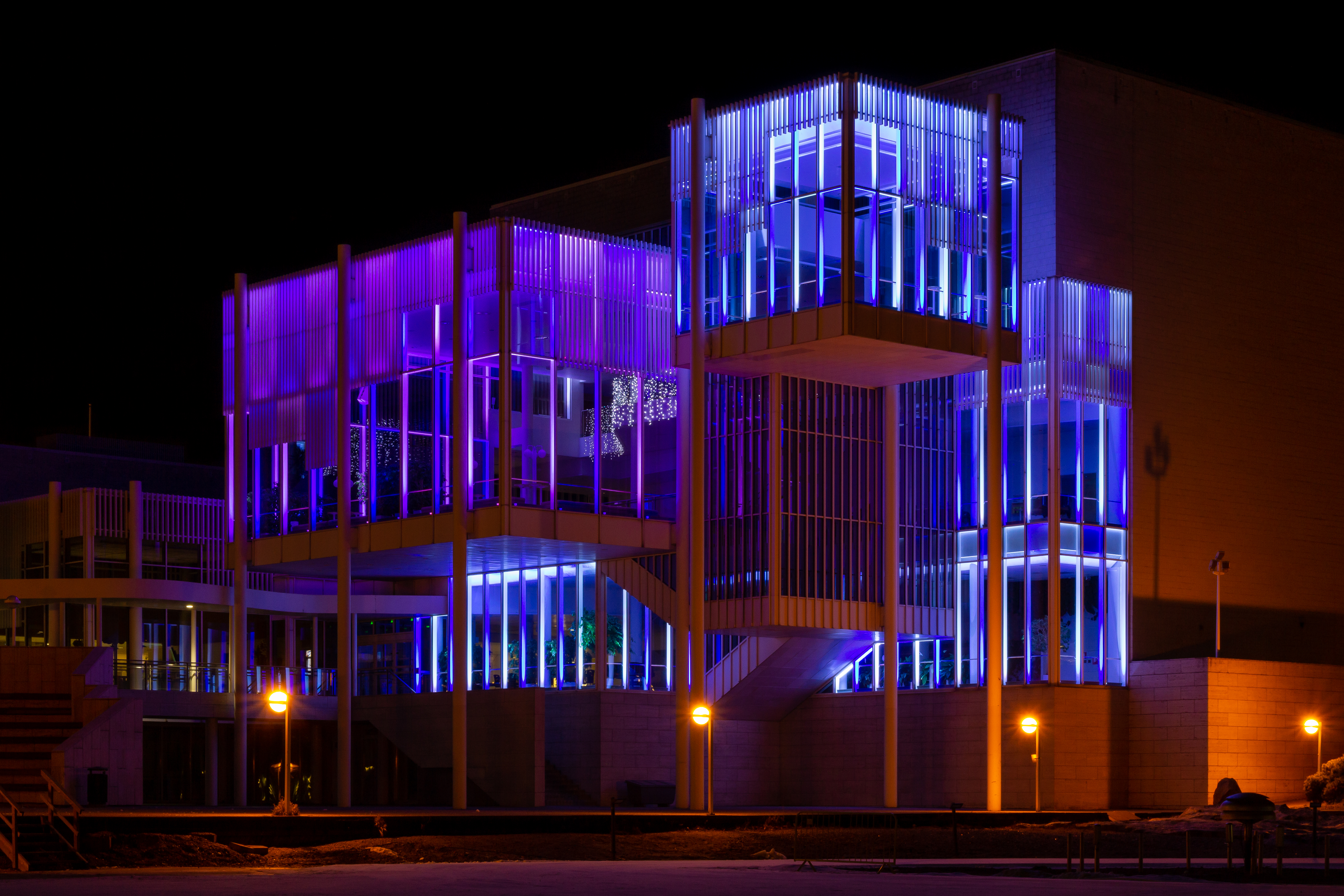
The Espoo Cultural Centre in nocturnal lighting in December 2018

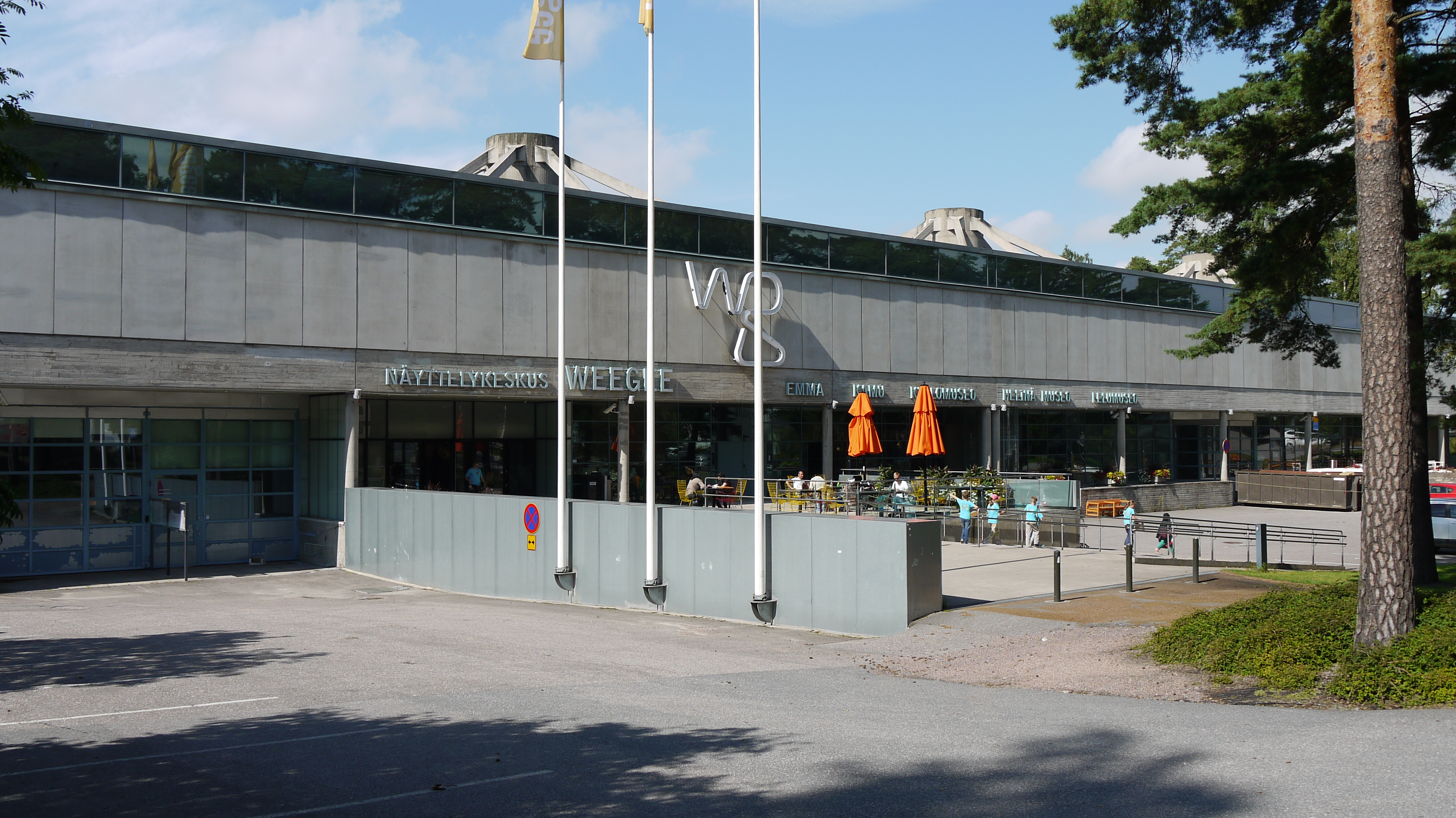
The WeeGee house in Tapiola, consisting of four different museums

Espoo hosts a Museum of Modern Art called EMMA (Espoo Museum of Modern Art), built in a renovated old print house, the WeeGee house, named after an old book print company Weilin & Göös. The same building hosts also Finland's only Museum of Horology (Finnish: Kellomuseo, Swedish: Urmuseum) and a Toy Museum. Glims Farmstead Museum is also located in the city. The Espoo cultural centre, home of the world-renowned Tapiola Sinfonietta, where numerous concerts and theater performances are held, is located in Tapiola (Swedish: Hagalund). The Akseli Gallen-Kallela Museum is located in Tarvaspää and the Haltia Nature Centre is located in Nuuksio.

Espoo has several old manors of which two are open to the general public. The most important is Espoon kartano (Swedish: Esbo gård, Espoo Manor), first mentioned in maps in 1495, and belonging to the noble Ramsay family since 1756. The current main building dates back to 1914, but a mill dates from the 1750s and Finland oldest walled stone bridge from 1777 is on the King's Road (Finnish: Kuninkaantie, Swedish: Kungsvägen) which passes by the manor. The main building can be rented for weddings and similar occasions. Guided tours are available on request for groups. The other manor open to public is Pakankylän kartano, located on the northern shore of Lake Bodom. The manor hosts a restaurant and club rooms, partly with original furniture open to the public, but meant originally to Kaisankoti sanatory and old people's home located on ground of the manor.

The Metal band Children of Bodom comes from Espoo, Finland. They are named after the unsolved murder known as the Lake Bodom murders which took place at the shore of Lake Bodom, a lake in northern Espoo, in 1960. The bands Norther and Kiuas also come from Espoo.

The educational department took part in Lifelong Learning Programme 2007–2013 in Finland.

Authors in Espoo include Antti Hyry and Mauri Kunnas. Arto Paasilinna, known for his comical narrative, was nominally Espoo's prosaist. Of his novels, Elämä lyhyt, Rytkönen pitkä ("Life is short, Rytkönen is tall") features the districts of Tapiola and Haukilahti, Aatami ja Eeva ("Adam and Eve") features Otaniemi and Herranen aika ("Oh my God") features Jorvi.

=== Events ===
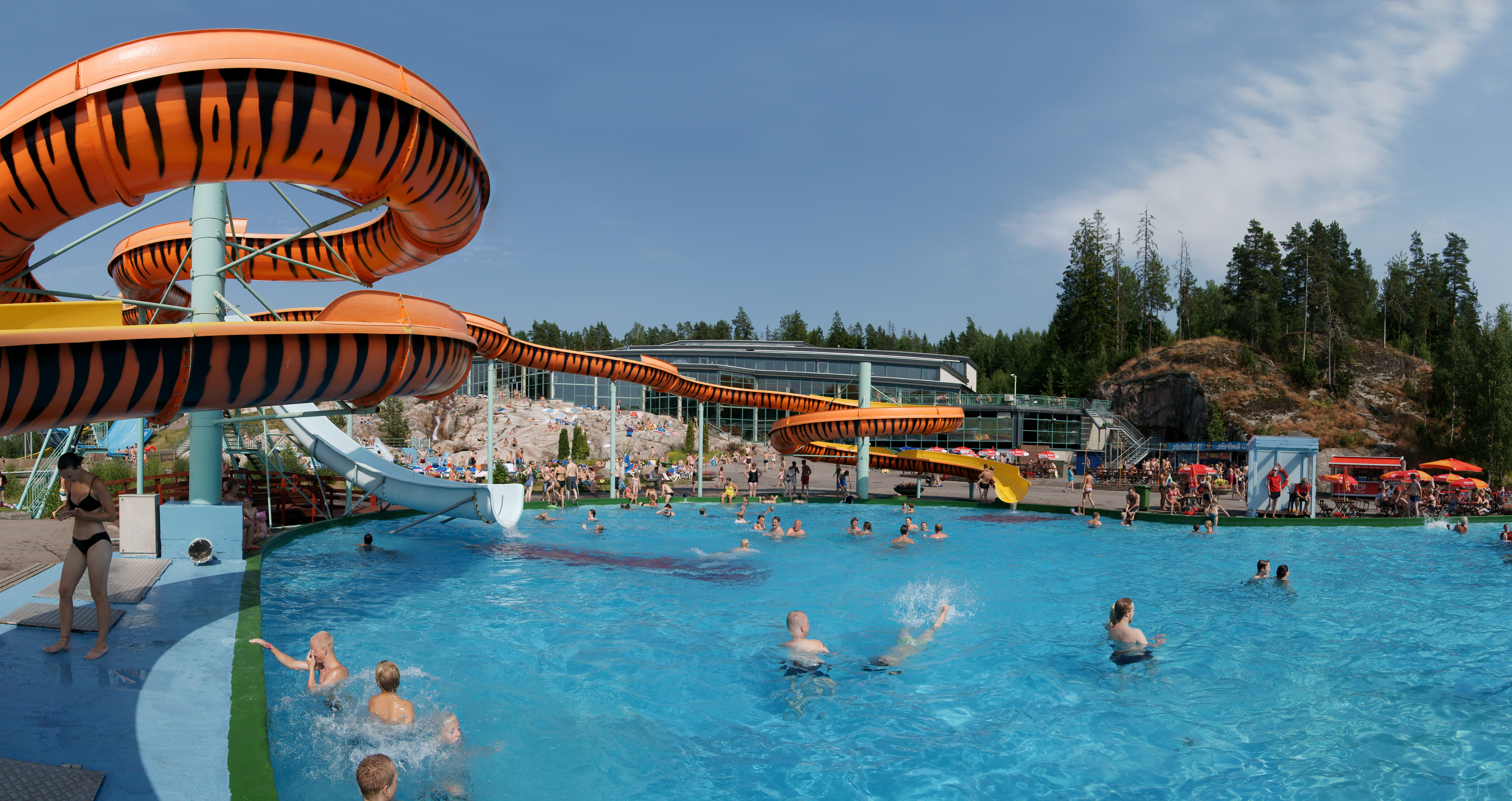
Serena Waterpark in Lahnus, Espoo

The district of Tapiola hosts the annual film festival Espoo Ciné and the annual music festival April Jazz. Leppävaara hosts the annual music festival Kivenlahti Rock. At wintertime, the Serena Waterpark hosts the Pacifique spa party. In summertime, the Espoo Cathedral hosts the concert event Urkuyö ja aaria, belonging to the Finland Festivals event chain. Ropecon, the largest independent role-playing game convention in Europe, was held at the Dipoli conference centre from 1998 to 2015.

The annual celebration of the Awakening movement was held in Espoo in 2008.

=== Food culture ===
In the 1980s, the parish dishes of Espoo were listed as cod potatoes, fisherman's herring pan and cake à la Anna. A noteworthy menu was the dinner at the Espoo manor, including bouillon and cheese sticks, roasted veal with cream sauce, canned peas, pickled cucumbers, ice cream and canned strawberries.

=== Cultural history ===
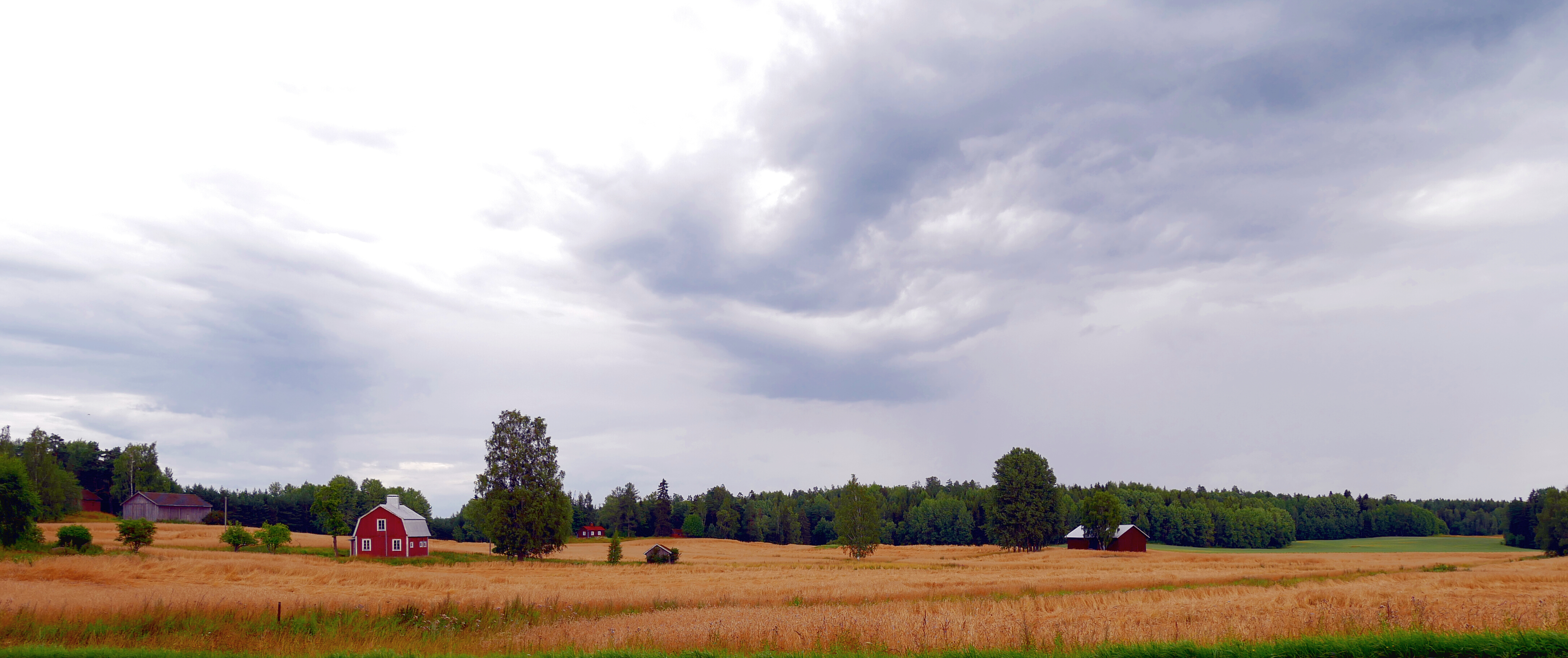
Rural landscape in Söderskog

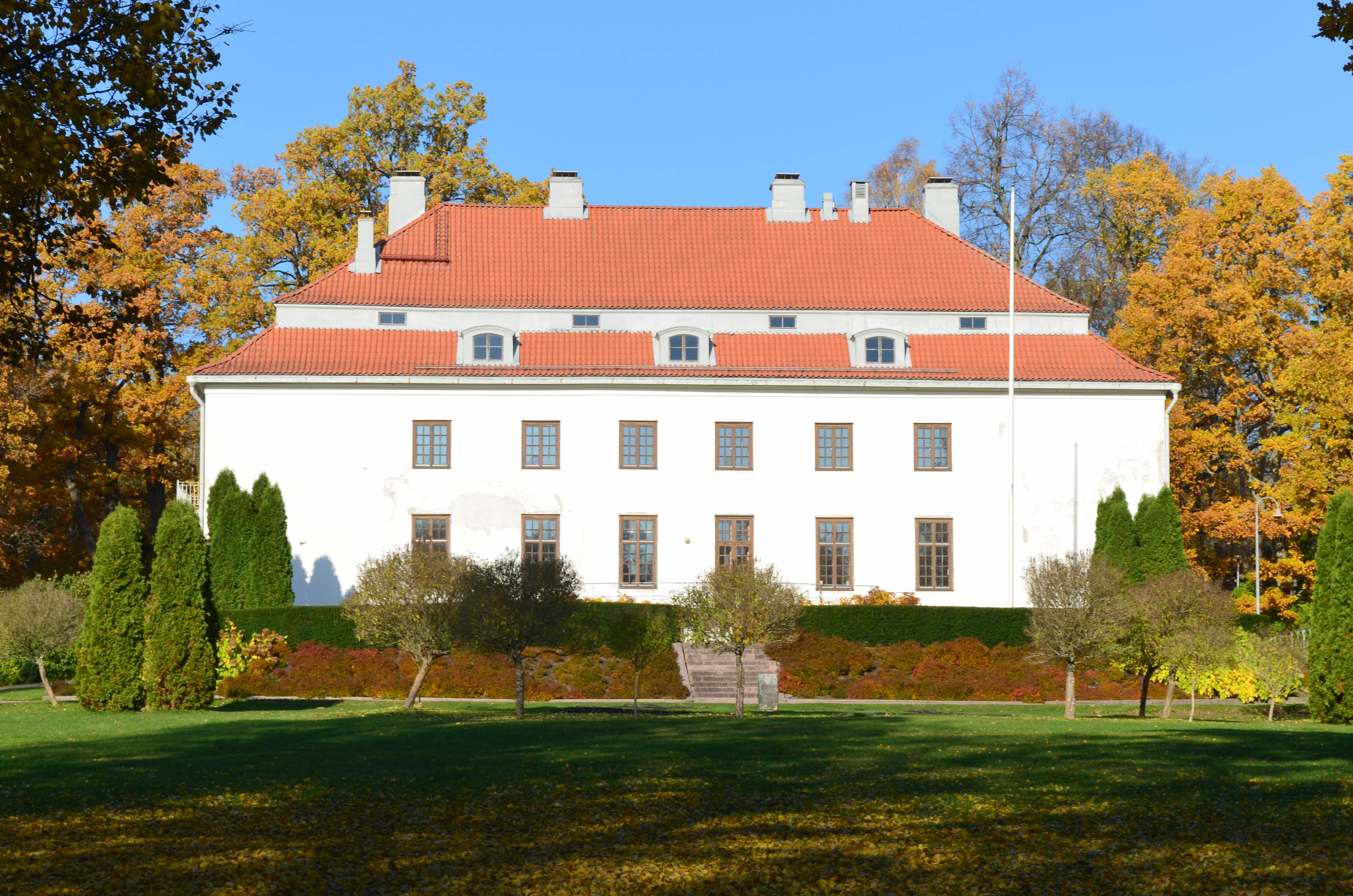
The Träskända manor is located in central Espoo.

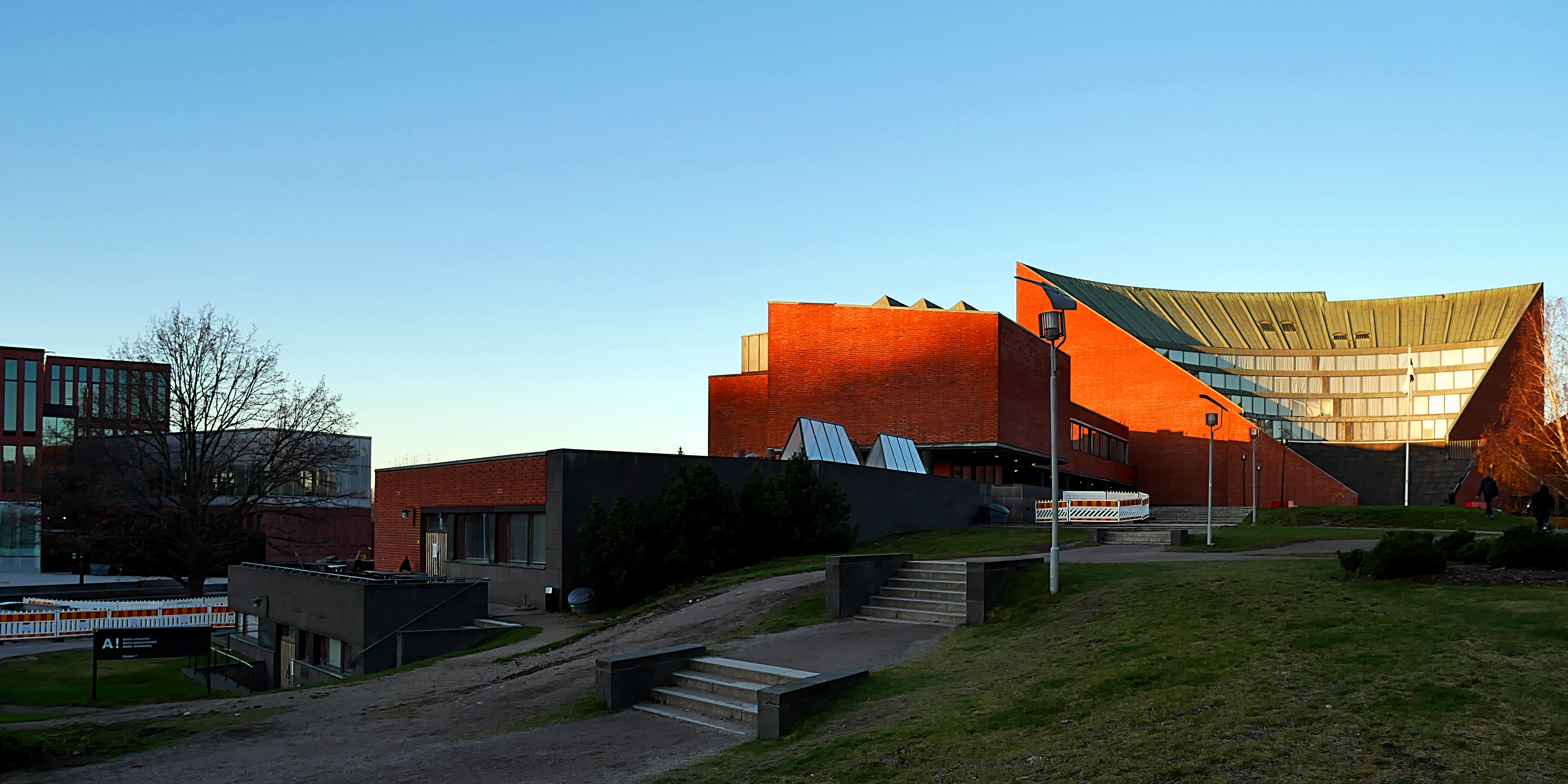
The buildings of the Aalto University are located on the lands of the old Otnäs manor.

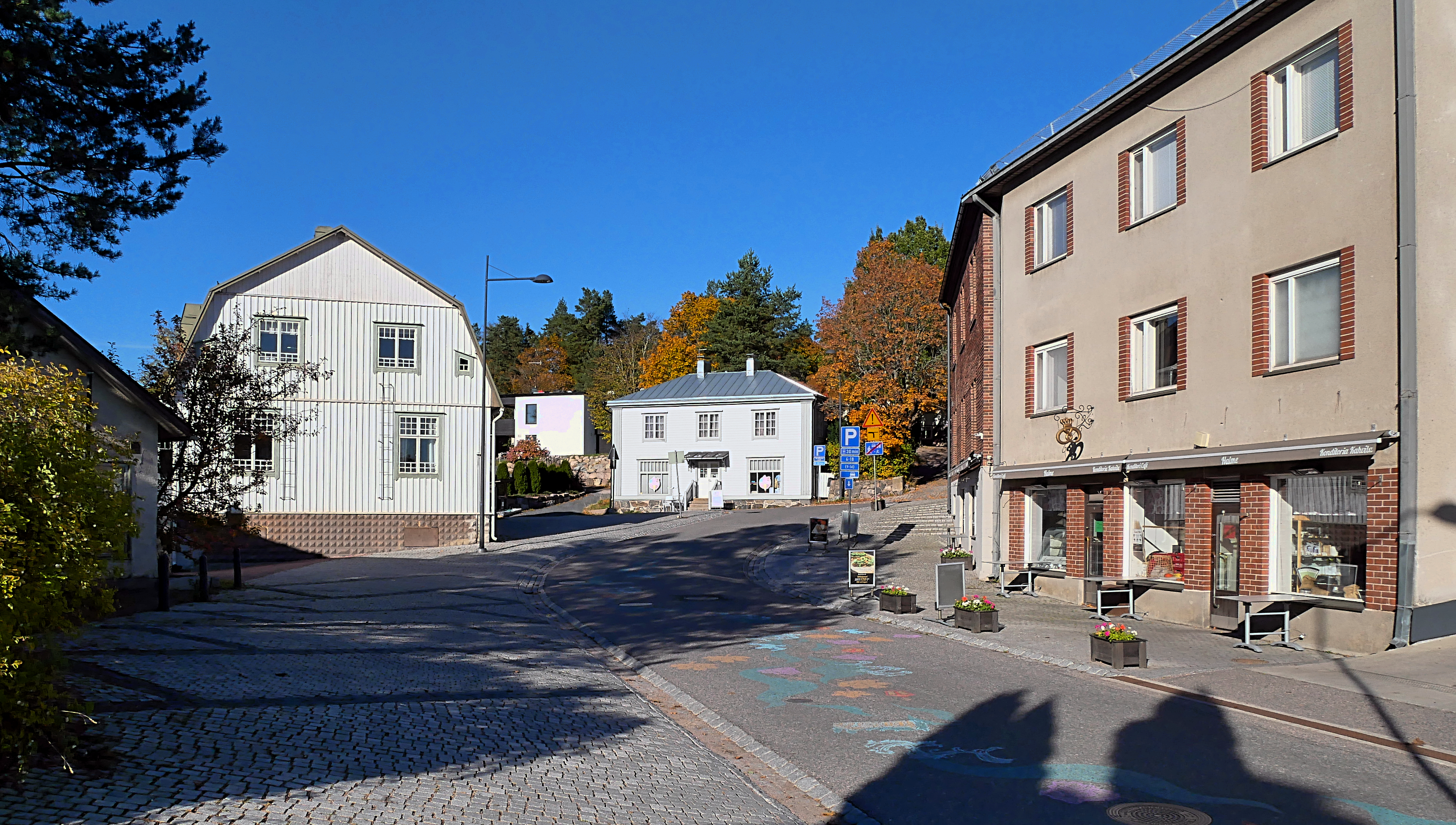
Kauppamäki in Kauklahti

The cultural landscape in Espoo started developing in river valleys and on plantations cleared on bays revealed by upthrust of land. The largest plantations were already in the map drawn in the middle 18th century mainly in the same form as in the late 20th century. Tightly built, small groups of buildings started developing on the edges of the plantations, at some places also on hills in between them. The large landscape of Snettans and Röylä stretches to the north of Lake Bodom, with the Pakankylä manor located in its southern part. There is a significant landscape to the west of the Espoo manor, There is a large plantation landscape stretching over the Velskola manor in northern Espoo.

The large cultural landscape of Bemböle-Karvasmäki is located to the northeast of Espoon keskus and the clearly defined landscape of Söderskog is located to the south of it. The well preserved village landscape of Gammelgård is located on the shore of lake Pitkäjärvi in eastern Espoo.

The most historically valuable landscape is located at Espoonjokilaakso near the Espoo Cathedral. The valley, surrounded by steep cliffs, was probably cleared for plantation use already in ancient times. As well as the cathedral, the landscape includes many other culturally significant buildings.

The typical rural village in Espoo was small: two or three houses in an asymmetric group on a hill. A notable exception was the village of Gammelgård: the village had thirteen houses in 1540. Because of the small number houses, the Great Partition in the late 18th century had little effect on the traditional cultural landscape in Espoo. The building tradition in Espoo remained old-fashioned for a long time: low paired houses were common up to the late 19th century. The storm in August 1890 brought upon a change, when new buildings according to the style at the time were built from thousands of logs felled by the storm.

Manor houses started appearing when one of the houses of the village grew larger than the others and developed into a riding farm, which ended up as property of the gentry. Thus almost all of the manor houses in Espoo are located at the site of an old peasant village. The Espoo manor was founded at the start of the new era, but most of the manor houses in Espoo had formed without an official founding in the late 18th century. The officers in Suomenlinna bought farms near Helsinki, resulting in so-called officer manor houses such as Bodom, Hovgård and Träskända. The late Carolinian appearance of the main buildings of the manor houses has been preserved the best in Bodom and Backby. The manor houses in Alberga and Kilo represent the style ideals of the late 19th century, while Träskända represents the start of the 20th century.

The owners of the manor houses started selling their lands to the municipality and to construction enterprises in the 20th century. The manor houses in southern Espoo were mostly torn down to make way for new buildings and roads. The medieval Gräsa manor, the only so-called old frälse in Espoo, was located in the Olari area. Gräsa is seen as a textbook example of the rapid and fundamental change in the cultural landscape in Espoo. The main buildings of the Hagalund and Matinkylä manor remain, while hardly anything remains of the Frisans and Finno manors. The Soukanpohja manor is the only manor house in Espoo to remain as a contiguous group of buildings. It also forms a small rural landscape in the middle of new development in the late 20th century.

The effect of the roads on the cultural landscape of Espoo is indisputable. Villages were founded along the King's Road and the road brought cultural influences along with it. The rural landscapes in Espoo started gradually changing in the late 19th century as new villas were founded on the coast because of regular steamship traffic. There is a well preserved summer villa milieu on the island of Iso Vasikkasaari. Many of the villas are known by their famous architects or commissioners, such as Villa Carlstedt designed by Lars Sonck.

Many villas were also founded in Kilo and Leppävaara. The Karhusaari villa was built in southeastern Espoo in the 1890s, as well as Villa Rulludd in Kaitaa. The first villas in Suvisaaristo were built on the island of Tallholm in the 1860s, before that the area had mostly consisted of fishing villages. The most architecturally valuable villa in Espoo is Villa Miniato in Soukka.

The Pasila-Karjaa railway, completed in 1903, had a significant impact on the cultural landscape of Espoo. Industrial buildings were built near the railway stations, attracting working class settlements. The first suburban areas also appeared along the railway: tuberculosis was a common cause of death among the Finns in the early 20th century, and the dry and bright hills in Espoo along with the pines growing on them were seen as suitable to prevent and treat the disease. Espoo was seen as a healthy alternative to Helsinki, but new settlement coming from the east was diverse and new residential areas were very different from each other. The city of Kauniainen developed into a showy area, while the district of Leppävaara developed into a more modest one.

== Sports ==
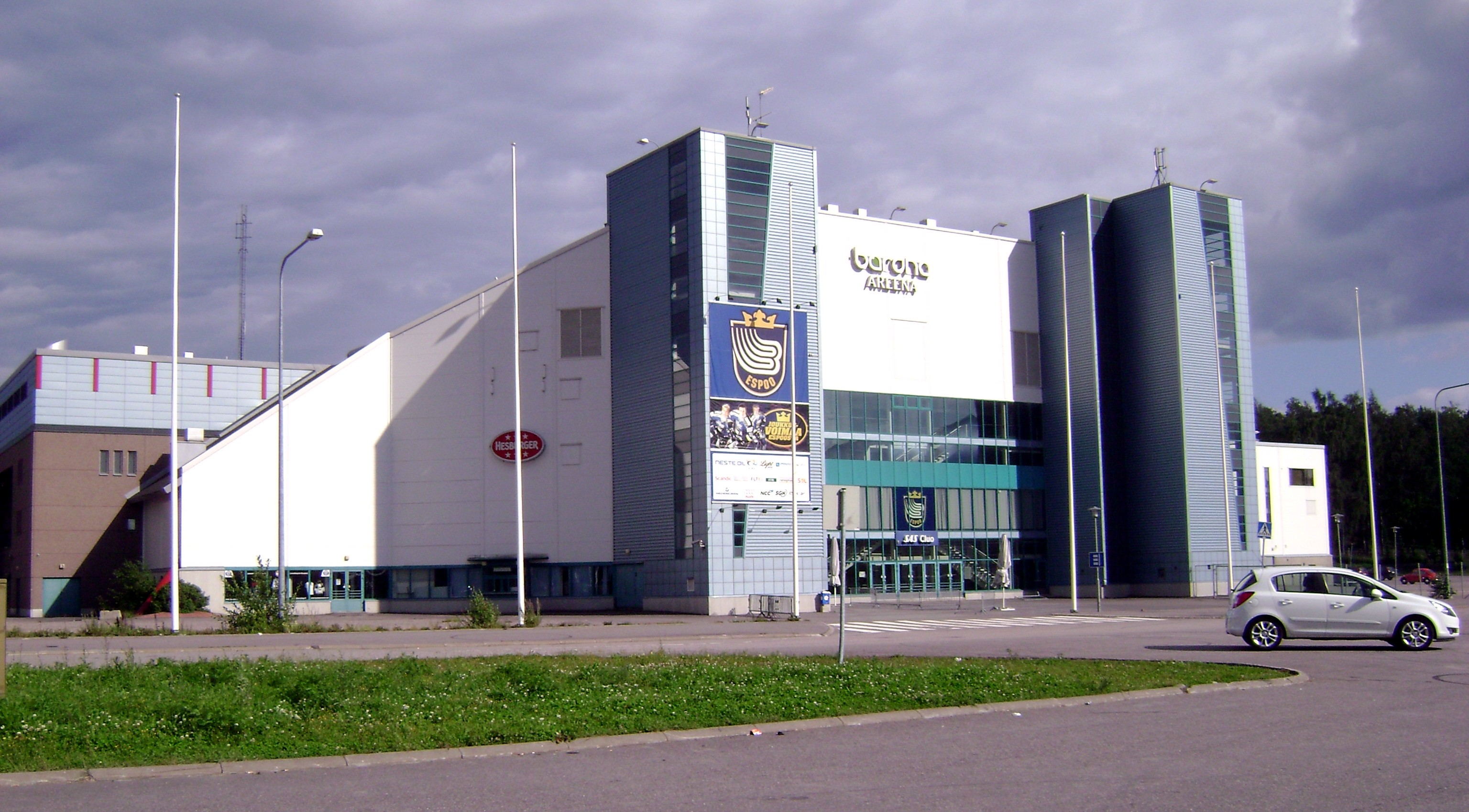
Espoo Metro Areena (formerly known as Barona Areena and Länsi-Auto Areena) is a sports and entertainment centre located in Tapiolan Urheilupuisto.

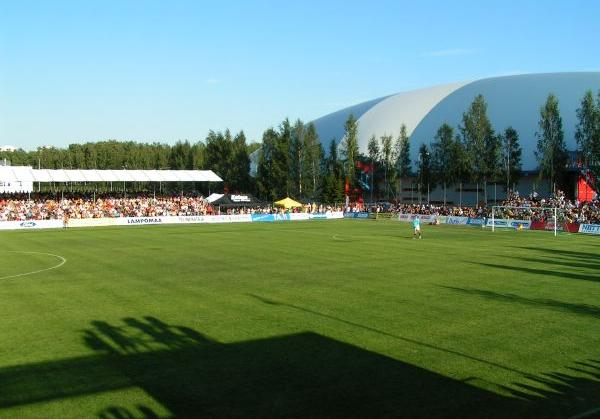
Tapiolan Urheilupuisto stadium in Tapiola

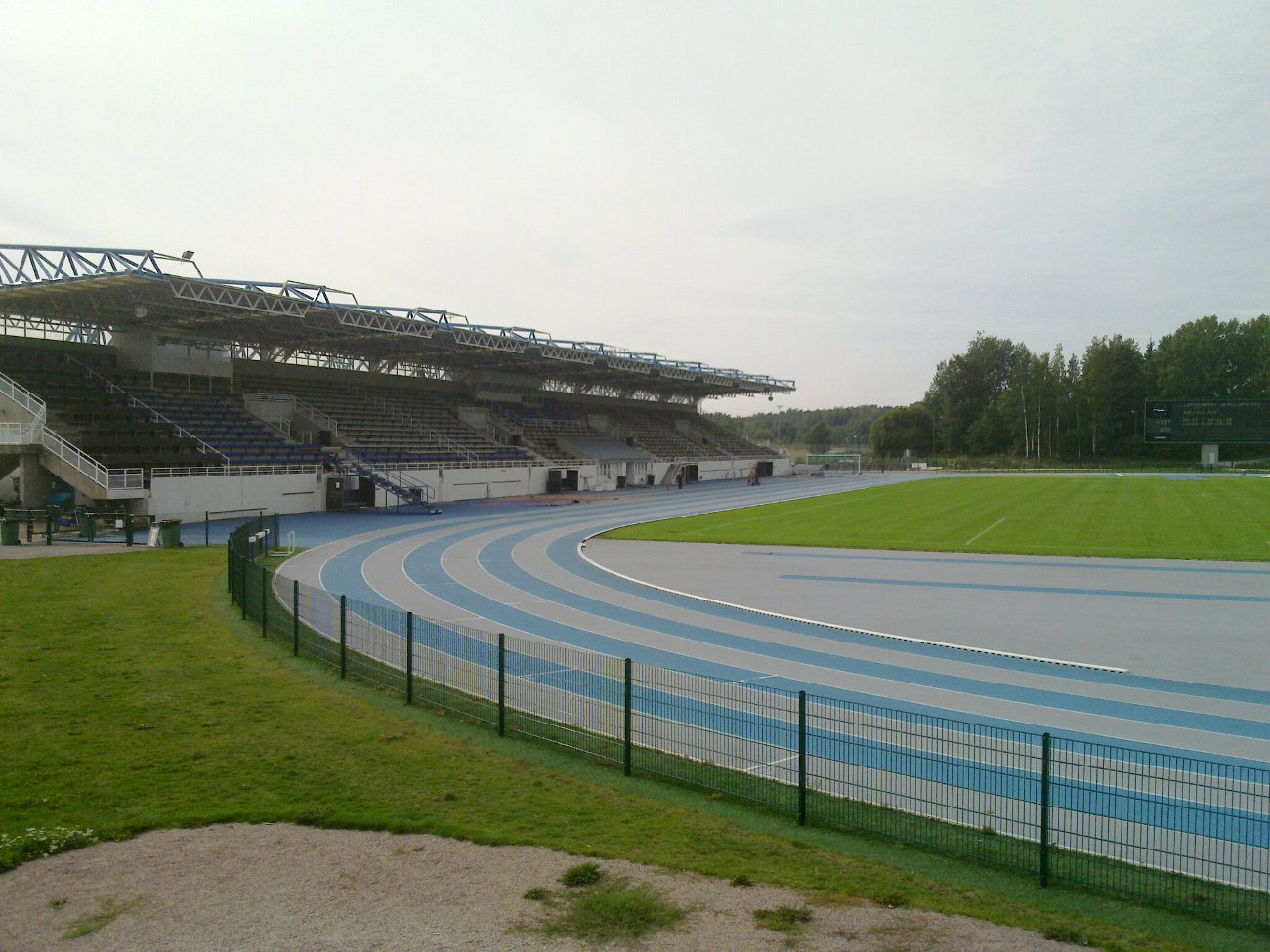
The Leppävaara sports park

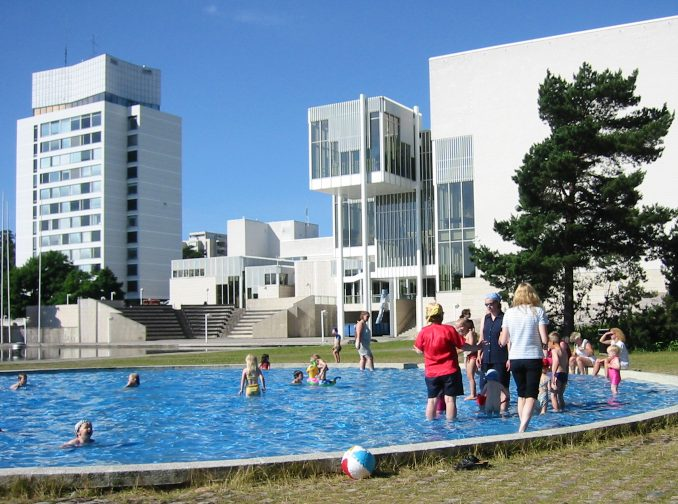
The waddling pool of the Tapiola swimming pool in summer 2001. In the background are the Espoo Cultural Centre to the right and the Tapiola Central Tower to the left.

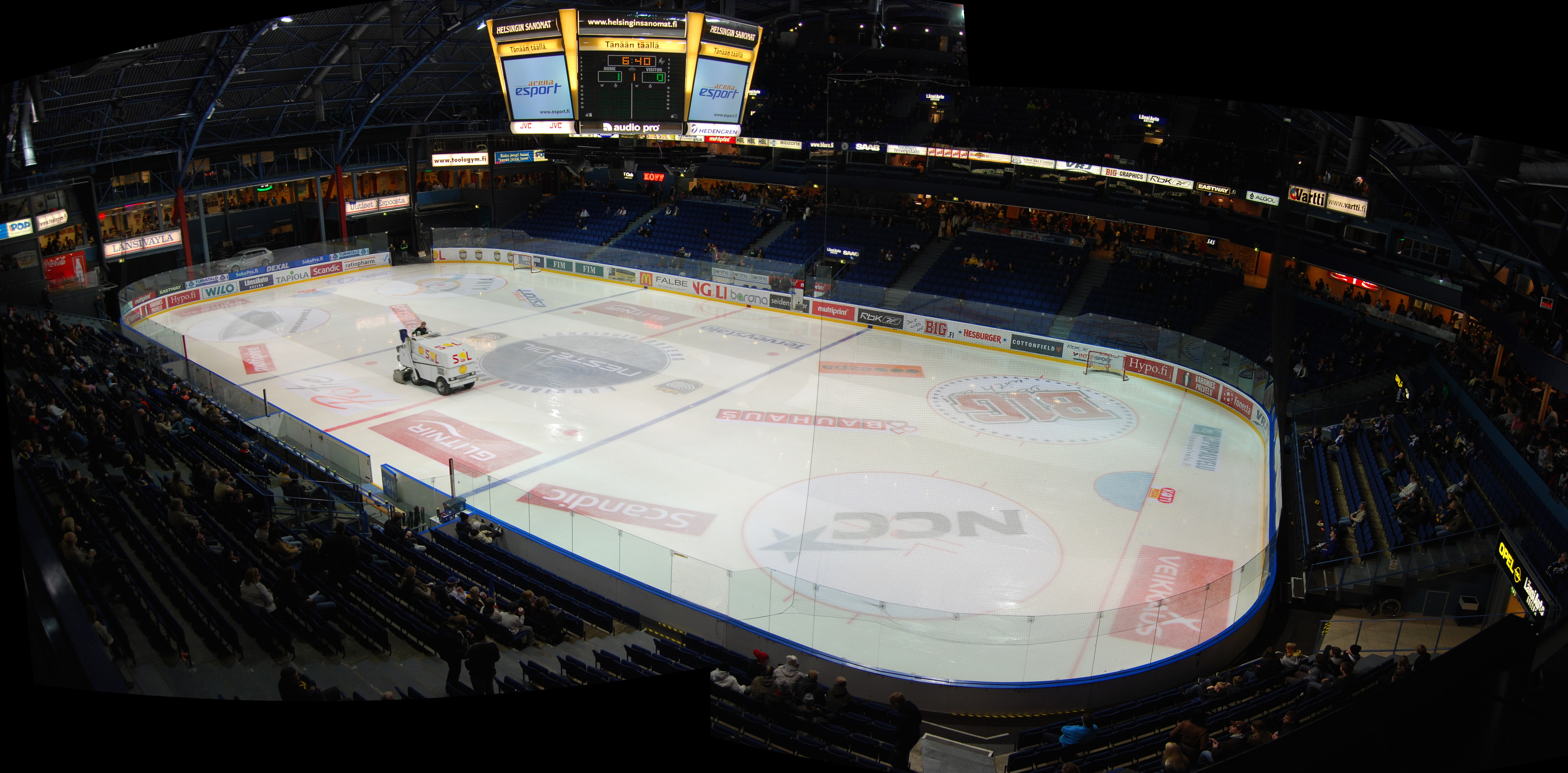
The indoor ice hockey rink of Espoo Metro Areena, the home arena of Kiekko-Espoo

At the 1952 Summer Olympics, the city's Westend Tennis Hall hosted the fencing events.

Many world famous sportspeople are from Espoo, such as ice hockey players Teemu Selänne and Jere Lehtinen, swimmer Antti Kasvio, figure skater Laura Lepistö, javelin thrower Tiina Lillak, cross-country skier Marjo Matikainen and Formula 1 world champion Kimi Räikkönen.

Espoo is home to the Vermo race track, the Espoo Metro Areena, the sports parks of Tapiolan urheilupuisto, Leppävaaran urheilupuisto, Espoonlahden urheilupuisto as well as the Serena Waterpark. The largest swimming pools in Espoo are the Leppävaara swimming pool, the Keski-Espoo swimming pool, the Espoonlahti swimming pool and the Tapiola swimming pool. Other exercise sites include the Espoo Central Park, the Espoo outdoor islands and the outdoor exercise areas of Luukki and Pirttimäki of the city of Helsinki.

=== Sportsperson of the year in Espoo ===
Every year a sportsperson of the year is chosen in Espoo. Titleholders include the following people:

- 2014: Gymnast Saga Hänninen, who has Down's syndrome. She competes in rhythmic gymnastics and is also active in other sports. She has won gold at the Special Olympics with her ball performance.
- 2015: Archer Jarkko Lehtinen.
- 2016: Artistic gymnast Oskar Kirmes, who achieved a record score in the Olympic tryouts in Rio de Janeiro, securing the first Olympic participation in men's artistic gymnastics for Finland in 44 years.
- 2017: Shooter Cristian Friman, who won the youths' world championship in prone rifle shooting in 2017.

=== Basketball ===
In 2027, the Espoo Metro Areena will be used as Finland's host city for the FIBA Women's EuroBasket.

=== Ice hockey ===
Espoo Blues was a successful hockey club; between 1998 and 2016 it iced a men's hockey team which played at the men's premier SM-liiga and a women's hockey team which played at the women's premier Naisten SM-sarja. The women's team, Espoo Blues Naiset, won 13 Finnish women's championships in the 18-year span (1998–2016), seven of them won consecutively. The men's and women's ice hockey teams were known as Kiekko-Espoo from 1984 to 1998 and 1990 to 1998 respectively.

In spring 2016 Jääkiekko Espoo Oy, the organization which owned the clubs, declared bankruptcy. A new club called Espoo United was established to replace Espoo Blues. Espoo United's men's ice hockey team played at the second highest level Mestis. The Espoo United women's hockey team played at the highest level, Naisten Liiga, and won silver in the 2017 league championships. Espoo United was also active in basketball and the men's basketball team played at the second highest level; the women's basketball team played at the highest level, Naisten Korisliiga.

In August 2017, in what was described as an effort to stabilize the club's tenuous financial situation, Espoo United abandoned its women's teams in both ice hockey and basketball. Espoo United's former women's basketball team quickly acquired transfer to Tapiolan Honka but the women's ice hockey team was left in an unsustainable situation.

The Finnish Ice Hockey Association chose to intervene in September 2017 and created an organization that would allow the team to play under the name Espoo Blues until a better structure could be identified. In April 2018, despite the dumping of its women's teams, Espoo United declared bankruptcy and its men's teams folded.

In April 2019, the women's ice hockey team Espoo Blues merged with Kiekko Espoo Oy, a significant junior hockey club with the largest girls hockey program in the country, to become Kiekko-Espoo Naiset. At the time of the merger, the team was the winningest team in Naisten Liiga history with 14 Naisten Liiga championships and a combined 24 Naisten Liiga championship medals over 29 seasons.

=== Football ===
FC Honka is the most successful local professional football club. The men's team was promoted into the Finnish premier division (Veikkausliiga) for the first time in its history at the end of the 2005 season. They play their home matches at Tapiolan urheilupuisto. Espoo is also home to SexyPöxyt of the fourth-tier Kolmonen league. They play their home matches at Laaksolahden urheilupuisto in the Laaksolahti district.

=== Floorball ===
Espoo also has two floorball teams playing at highest level Salibandyliiga. The two teams are Esport Oilers and Westend Indians.

=== Running ===
Espoo is home to the Länsiväyläjuoksu, an annual running event that starts and finishes in Otaniemi.

=== Athletes from Espoo ===
Espoo is the birthplace of 2007 Formula One World Champion Kimi Räikkönen, former Dallas Stars forward Jere Lehtinen (three time NHL Selke Trophy winner), former Formula One driver JJ Lehto, professional downhill mountain biker Matti Lehikoinen, professional ten-pin bowling star Osku Palermaa and 2009 European Figure Skating Champion Laura Lepistö.

== Parks and recreation ==
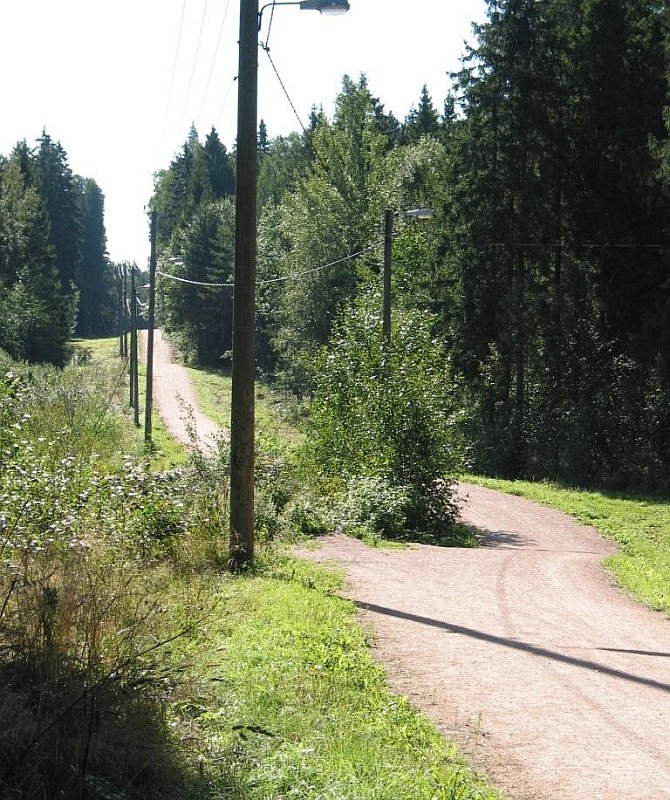
Espoo Central Park

The city's 880 ha (2,200 acres) Central Park is located directly in the middle of the city, and it consists of natural forests, meadows, cliffs, wetlands as well as recreational routes. Central Park is the second-largest natural area in Espoo, after Nuuksio National Park, located in the northern part of the city. The park consists of two separate areas, Central Park I and II, approved by the City Council in 1996 and 2004, respectively.

== Government and politics ==
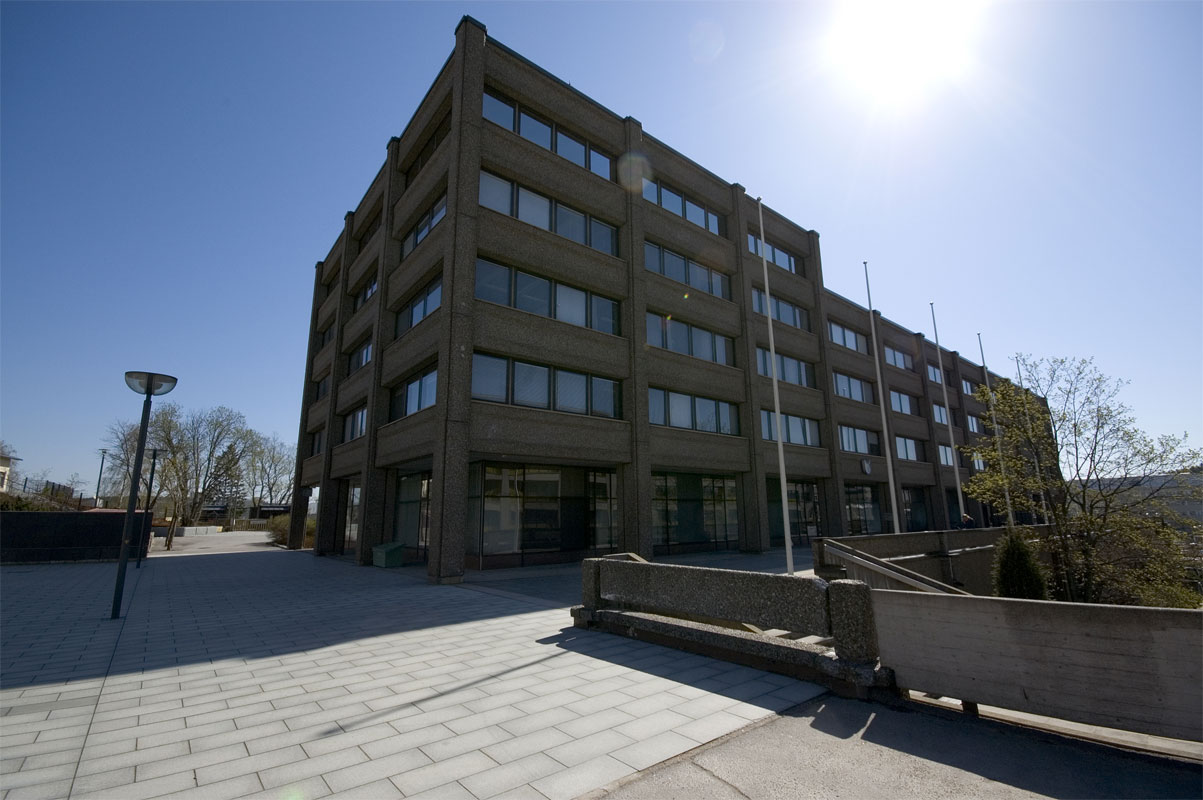
Espoo City Hall, located in Espoon keskus

Espoo's city council has 75 members. Nationally, Espoo is a part of the constituency of Uusimaa. Support for the centre-right politics, especially the National Coalition Party, is traditionally high in Espoo. Following the Finnish municipal elections of 2025 the council seats are allocated in the following way: National Coalition Party 28 seats, Green League 15 seats, Social Democratic Party of Finland 14 seats, Swedish People's Party of Finland 6 seats, Finns Party 4 seats, Left Alliance 3 seats, Christian Democrats 2 seats, Centre Party 2 seats and, Liberal Party 1 seat.

Espoo is the home for the former Finns Party chairman Timo Soini.

== Services ==
=== Education ===
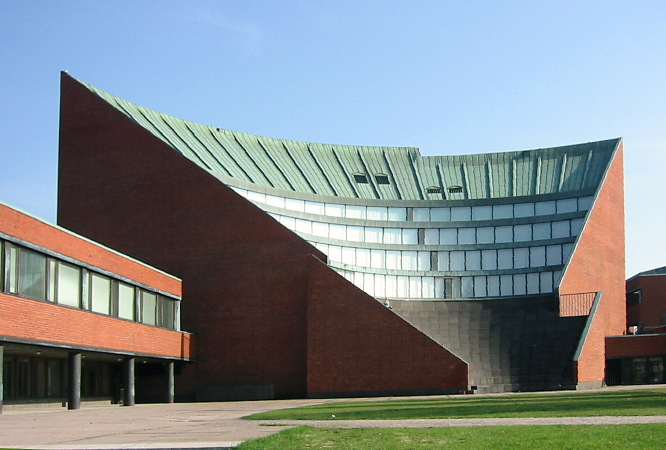
The auditorium of the main building of the Aalto University, designed by Alvar Aalto

The Otaniemi campus of the Aalto University is located in Espoo, containing all six colleges of the university starting from February 2019. Espoo is also home to the Metropolia University of Applied Sciences (formerly known as the Technical University of Applied Sciences in Espoo-Vantaa) and local colleges of the Laurea University of Applied Sciences. The musical institute Juvenalia is located near the Sello shopping centre. The Espoo Musical Institute is located in the Espoo Cultural Centre.

=== Healthcare ===
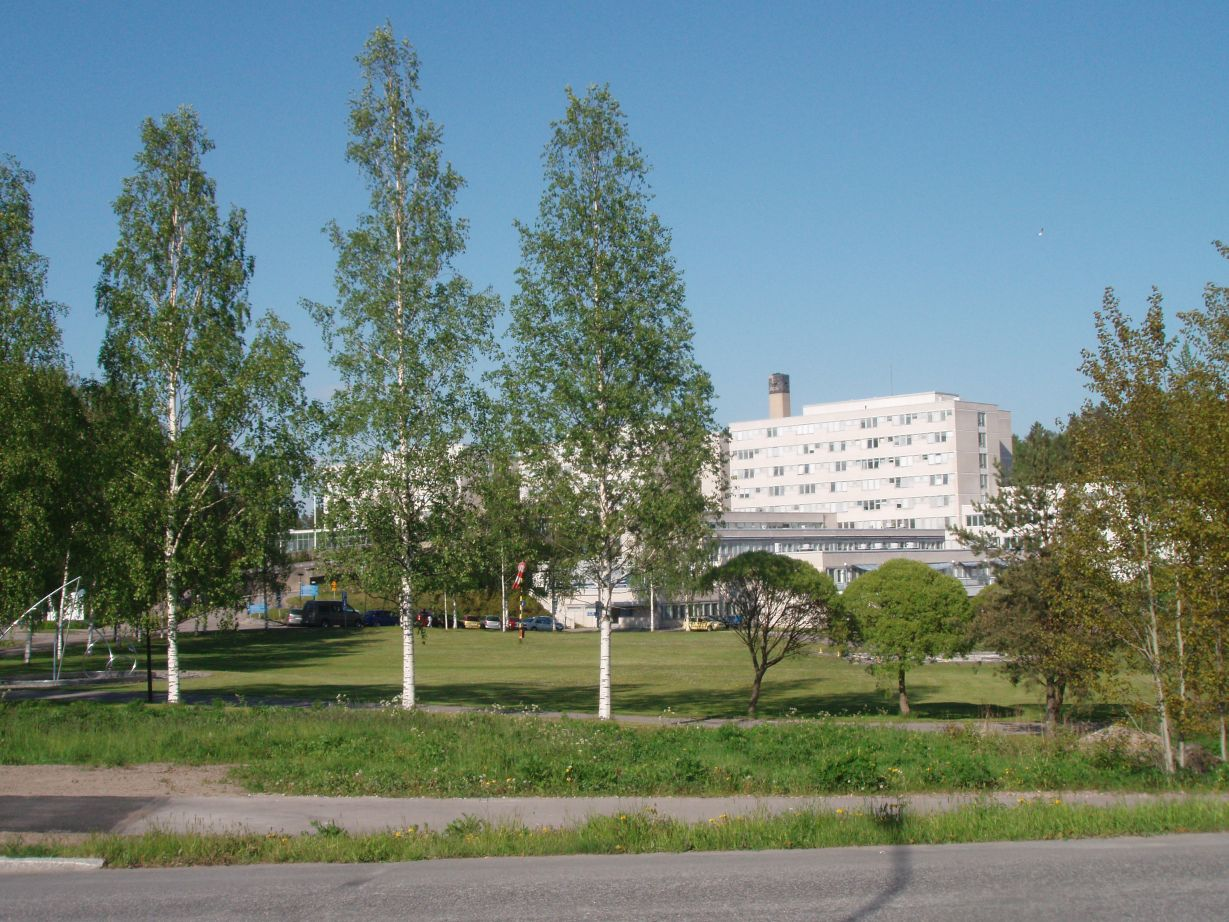
The Jorvi Hospital in Espoo

The Jorvi Hospital is located in Karvasmäki in Espoo, cooperating with the Helsinki University Central Hospital and belonging to the Hospital District of Helsinki and Uusimaa. There are a total of ten healthcare stations handling municipal healthcare in Espoo.

== Infrastructure ==
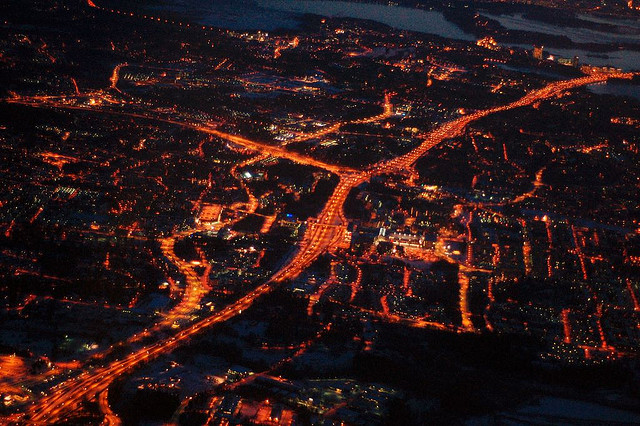
A night-time view of the environment around Länsiväylä

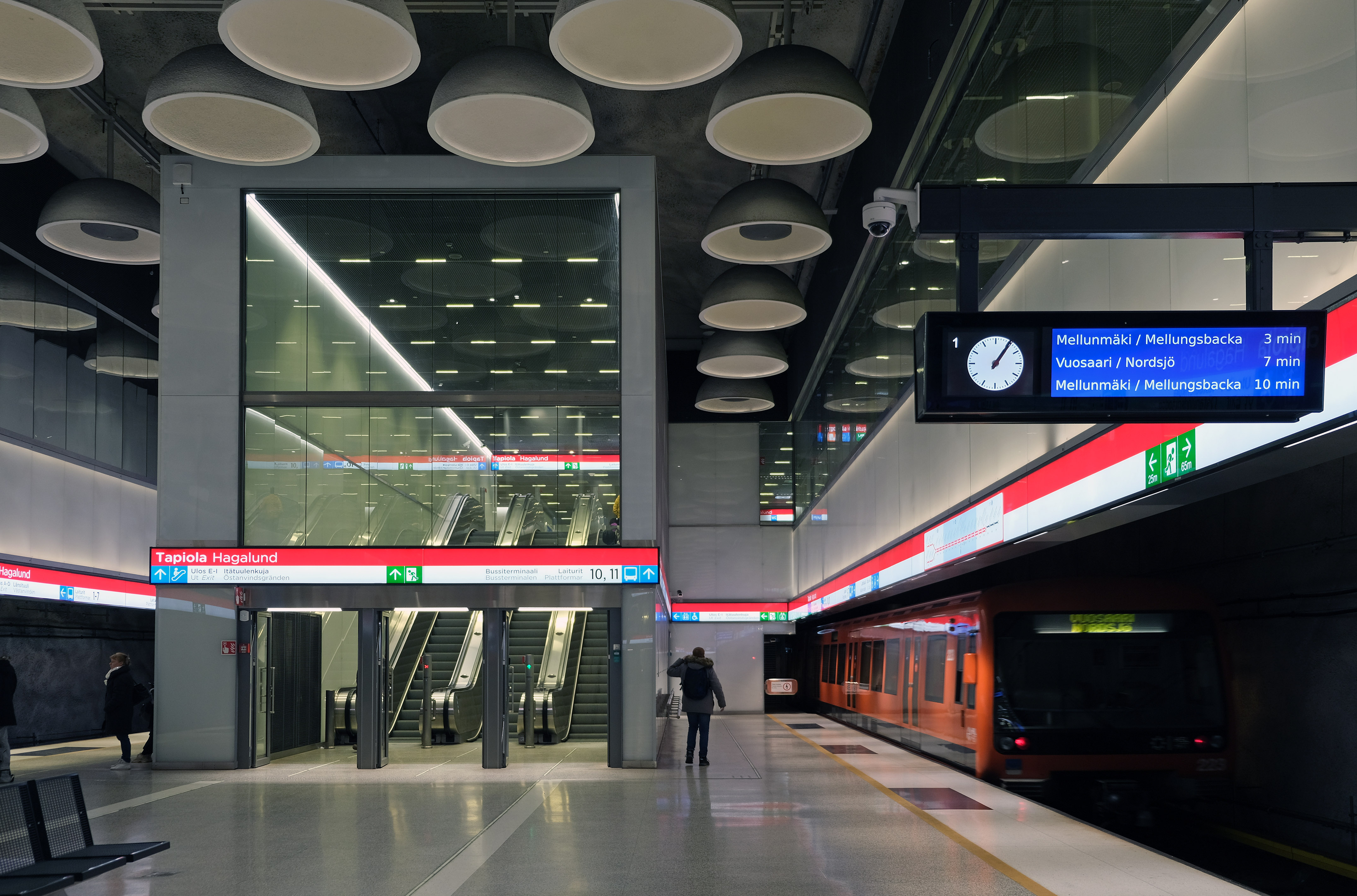
The Tapiola metro station has a connection to the Ainoa shopping centre.

There are two controlled-access highways going through Espoo to the west: Länsiväylä, which is part of the Finnish national road 51 between Helsinki and Karjaa, and the Finnish national road 1 going further west to Turku. These roads and other main roads leading from Helsinki to various directions are connected by the beltways Ring I and Ring III, partly located in Espoo, as well as Ring II leading from Länsiväylä to the Finnish regional road 110, located entirely in Espoo. The Finnish regional road 120 goes through northern Espoo, forming part of the old route of the Finnish national road 2.

=== Public transport ===
Espoo is well-served by public transport, through the Helsinki commuter rail network, the Helsinki Metro's Länsimetro extension opened in November 2017, and buses provided by Helsingin seudun liikenne. In 2024 the orbital Jokeri light rail line will connect Espoo to eastern Helsinki.

Data communications in Espoo have been handled by sixteen broadcast frequencies.

==== Metro transport ====
Route map of the Länsimetro extension

The Länsimetro extension to the Helsinki Metro was started in 2008 and the first phase was opened for traffic on 18 November 2017. The first phase consists of six stations: Keilaniemi, Aalto University, Tapiola, Urheilupuisto, Niittykumpu and Matinkylä. The second phase consists of an additional five stations: Finnoo, Kaitaa, Soukka, Espoonlahti and Kivenlahti, and was originally expected to be completed in 2023 at the earliest. The extension was completed on 3 December 2022.

==== Railway transport ====
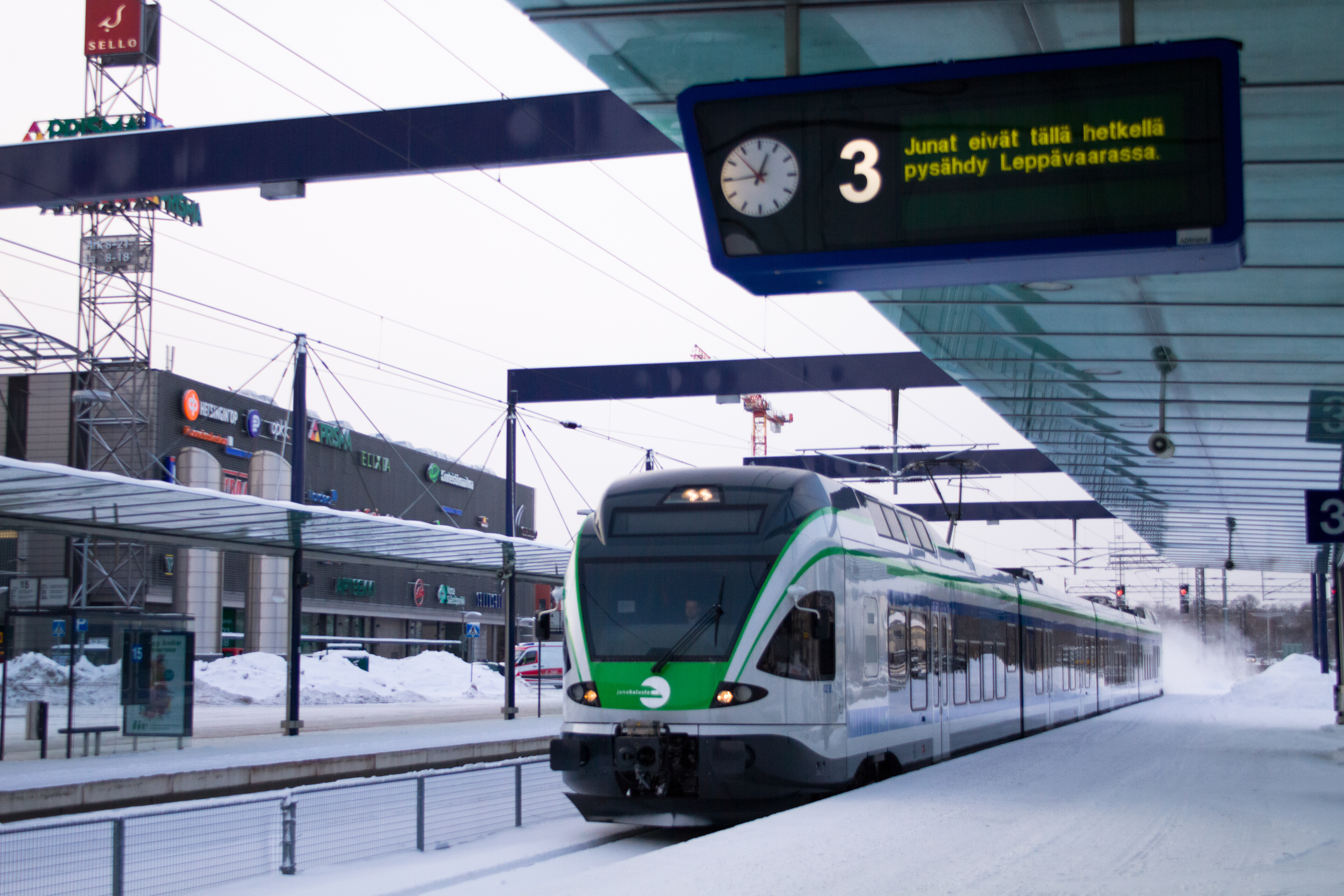
A JKOY Class Sm5 local train at the Leppävaara railway station

There are nine railway stations in Espoo, of which only the Leppävaara railway station serves long-distance traffic. The Leppävaara railway station is the busiest railway station in Espoo, with the Espoo railway station being the second busiest.

The local traffic on the Rantarata railway is frequent, and the train lines are marked with letters. L trains stop at every station from Helsinki Central Station to Kirkkonummi railway station. E, U, L and X trains stop at every station in Espoo and Kauniainen except Mäkkylä railway station. Only A and L trains stop at Mäkkylä. Y trains between Helsinki Central Station and Siuntio railway station stop at Leppävaara railway station, Espoo railway station and Kauklahti railway station. A trains travel along the Leppävaara city railway with a terminus at Leppävaara. All local trains travelling through Espoo stop at Pasila railway station, with connections to Tampere, and also at Huopalahti railway station, with a P train connection to the Helsinki Airport in northern Vantaa.

Long-distance trains between Helsinki and Turku previously stopped at Espoo railway station. Starting from autumn 2015 the stop was moved to Leppävaara railway station.

==== Bus transport ====
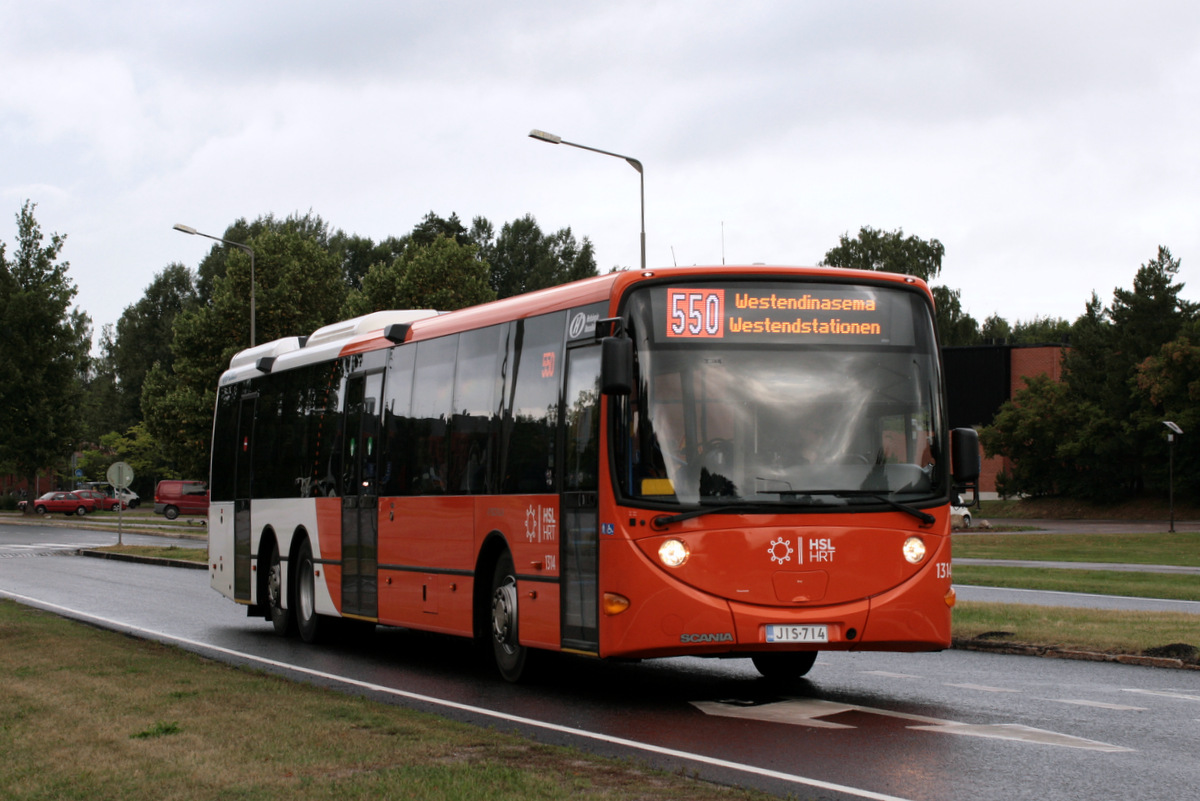
A bus on line 550 in Otaniemi

Numerous bus lines serve public transport in Espoo. The Helsinki Regional Transport Authority is responsible for bus transport in Espoo, planning the routes, timetables and ticket systems. Bus line 200 is the only trunk line in Espoo, travelling between Espoon keskus and the Eliel Square in central Helsinki. The line has 32 stops, which is 12 stops fewer in Espoo than on the previous trunk line 235.

There are a hundred accessible bus stops in Espoo. The first accessible stop was built in 2006 on Puolarintie, next to the Puolarmetsä Hospital.

Bus lines in southern Espoo travel to the Matinkylä metro station and at times of heavy traffic, directly to the Kamppi Center in Helsinki. There are also internal bus lines to Tapiola. In contrast, the bus lines in central and northern Espoo travel via Töölö to the Eliel Square. All line numbers of Espoo bus lines were changed to three digits in the 2010s. Line numbers beginning with 1 mainly travel in southern Espoo and line numbers beginning with 2 in central and northern Espoo. Bus lines travelling between southern and central Espoo have numbers beginning with 5. The Joker line 550 travels between Westend and Itäkeskus bypassing the Helsinki city centre by going to the north of it.

== International relations ==
The City of Espoo has ten official sister cities:

- Esztergom, Hungary
- Irving, Texas, United States
- Køge, Denmark
- Kongsberg, Norway
- Kristianstad, Sweden
- Kryvyi Rih, Ukraine
- Nõmme, Estonia
- Osan, South Korea
- Shanghai, China
- Skagafjörður, Iceland

== Notable people ==
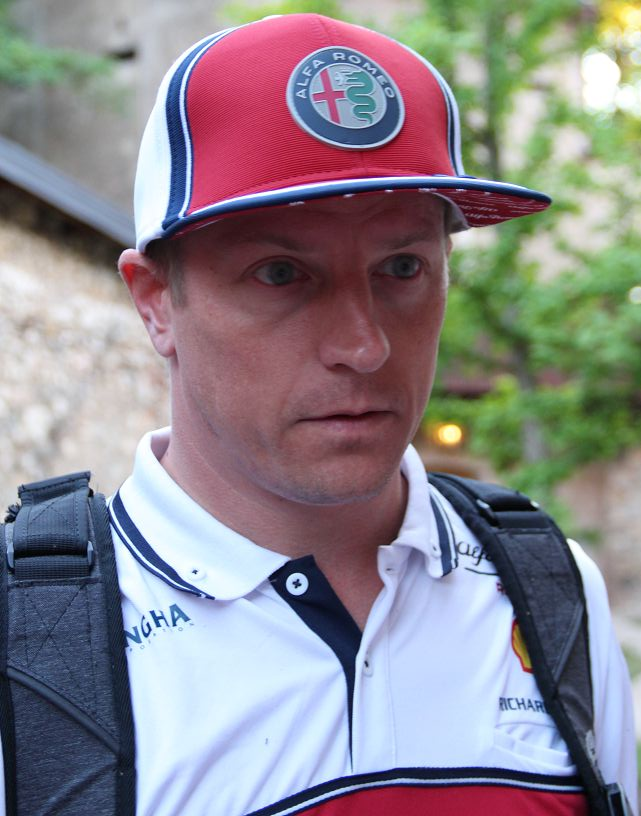
Kimi Räikkönen, former Formula 1, WRC, and NASCAR driver, and 2007 world champion

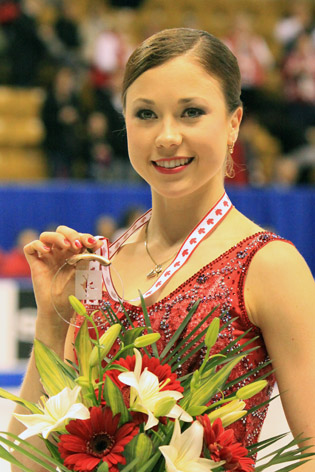
Laura Lepistö

- Susan Aho (born 1974), singer and member of the band Värttinä
- Peter Ahola (born 1968), former NHL player for the San Jose Sharks, Los Angeles Kings, and others
- Niklas Hagman (born 1979), ice hockey player
- Kirsi Heikkinen (born 1978), football referee
- Miro Heiskanen (born 1999), ice hockey player
- Ella Junnila (born 1998), athlete
- Mikko Kärnä (born 1980), politician
- Teemu Keisteri (born 1985), visual artist, DJ, also known as Windows95man
- Henri Kontinen (born 1990), tennis player
- Krista Kosonen (born 1983), actress
- Alexi Laiho (1979–2020), guitarist and vocalist, co-founder of the metal band Children of Bodom
- Jani Lajunen (born 1990), ice hockey player
- Konsta Lappalainen (born 2001), racing driver
- Jere Lehtinen (born 1973), ice hockey player
- Jyrki Juhani Järvilehto (born 1966), racing driver
- Laura Lepistö (born 1988), figure skater
- Sami Lepistö (born 1984) ice hockey player
- Petri Lindroos (born 1980), musician and member of the Finnish folk metal band Ensiferum
- Anton Lundell (born 2001), ice hockey player
- Pekka Lundmark (born 1966), businessman
- Ukko-Pekka Luukkonen (born 1999), ice hockey goaltender
- Nikolas Matinpalo (born 1998), ice hockey player
- Nelli Matula (born 1995), singer
- Osku Palermaa (born 1983), ten pin bowler
- Heidi Parviainen (born 1979), musician and member of the Finnish symphonic metal band Dark Sarah, former lead of Finnish symphonic power metal band Amberian Dawn
- Kimi Räikkönen (born 1979), former racing driver and 2007 Formula One World Champion
- Noora Räty (born 1989) ice hockey player
- Tony Salmelainen (born 1981), ice hockey player
- Rasmus Schüller (born 1991), football player
- Viljami Sinisalo (born 2001), football player
- Kristian Sohlberg (born 1978), rally driver
- Gösta Sundqvist (1957–2003), bandleader of Leevi and the Leavings
- Joonas Suotamo (born 1986), actor in the Star Wars series and a former professional basketball player
- Antti Törmänen (born 1970), ice hockey coach
- Aaro Vainio (born 1993), racing driver
- Valtteri Virkkunen (born 1991), ice hockey player
- Ville Virtanen (born 1961), actor
- Mirel Wagner (born 1987), singer

== See also ==
- Blominmäki sewage treatment plant
- The UN's Convention on Environmental Impact Assessment in a Transboundary Context, signed in Espoo 1991 (text of Convention)
- Districts of Espoo
- Espoo Metro Areena
- FC Honka Espoo
- FC Espoo
- Iso Omena
- Kauniainen
- Kytö
- Lake Bodom
- Länsiväylä
- List of European regions by GDP
- Pohjois-Tapiola
- Pakankylä
- Postipuu School
- Ring II
- Sello mall shooting
- Tapiola, Espoo
- Westend, Espoo
