= Otaniemi =

Otaniemi Otnäs
- District
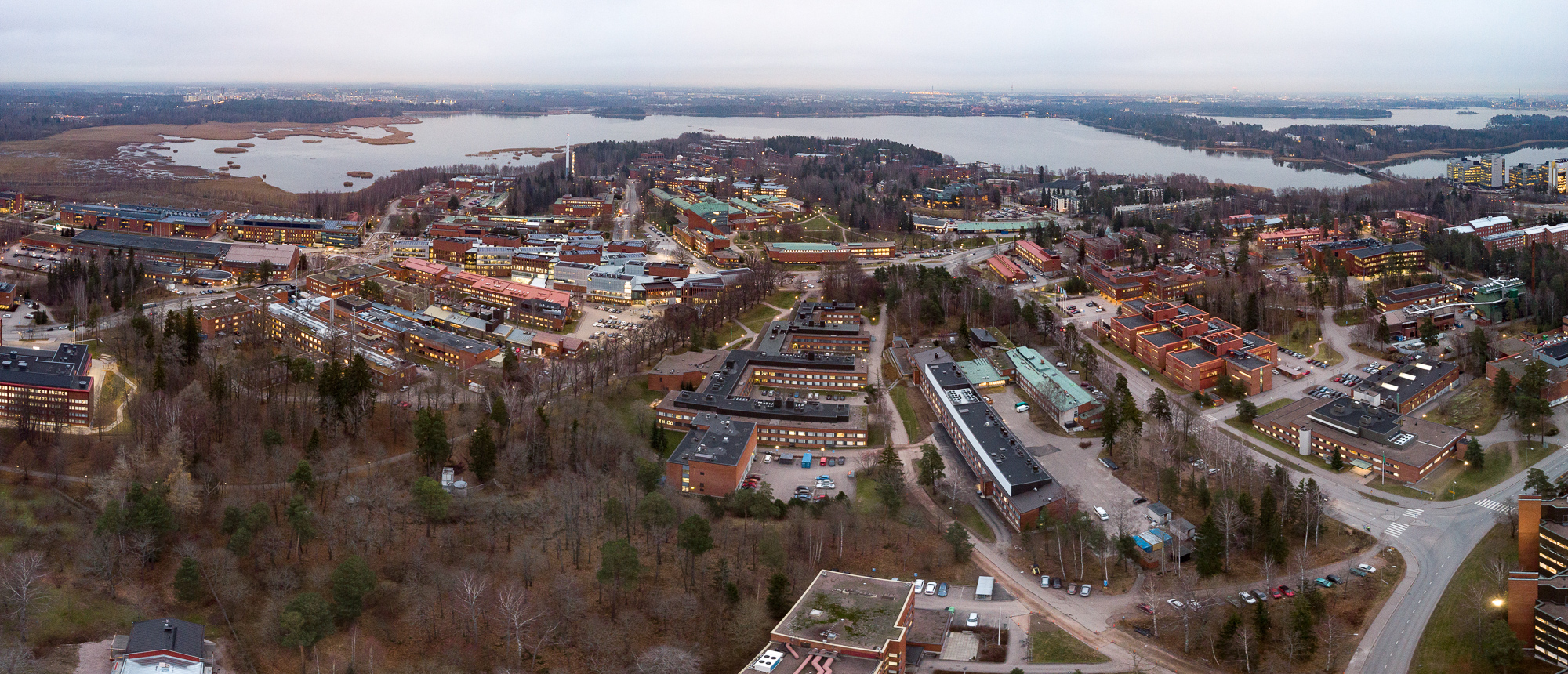
- Aerial view of Otaniemi (2019)

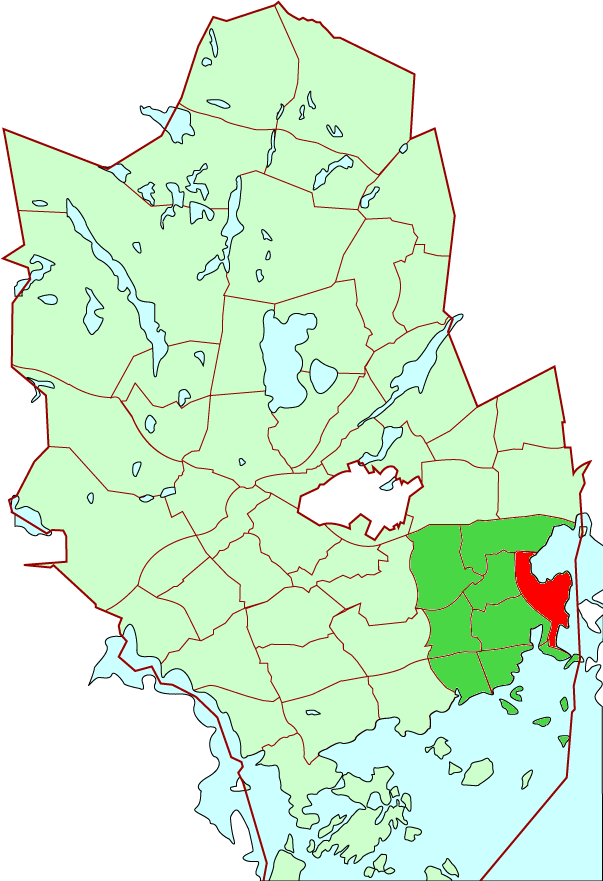
- Location of Otaniemi within Espoo
- Coordinates: 60°11′N 24°50′E
- Country: Finland
- Municipality: Espoo
- Region: Uusimaa
- Sub-region: Helsinki metropolitan area
- Main District: Suur-Tapiola
- Inner District(s): Otaniemi, Keilaniemi

Population (2006)
  - Total: 3,496

Languages
  - Finnish: 82.6%
  - Swedish: 4.3%
  - Other: 13.2%
- Jobs: 12,826

Otaniemi (Finnish), or Otnäs (Swedish), is a district of Espoo, Finland. It is located near the border with Helsinki, the capital of Finland.

Otaniemi is located on the southern shore of the Laajalahti bay, next to the district of Tapiola near the border to Helsinki. It is part of the Greater Tapiola major district. Otaniemi and Tapiola are separated by the Ring I beltway. The Aalto University metro station, located in Otaniemi, was put into service in 2017.

Otaniemi is the home of Aalto University's campus, thus "Otaniemi" is often used as a synonym for Aalto. However, several research and business facilities are also located in Otaniemi. The most prominent institutions for science and engineering in Otaniemi are the VTT Technical Research Centre of Finland and the Geological Survey of Finland (GTK). Business is represented in the area by the business incubator Technopolis. In 2010, Otaniemi became home to Aalto University, formed from the merger of the Helsinki University of Technology, the University of Art and Design Helsinki, and the Helsinki School of Economics.

== History ==
The oldest signs of human activity in the Otaniemi area can be found in front of the courtyard of what is now Jämeräntaival 1 (the so-called summer hotel): a pile of rocks dating from the Bronze Age (also called "the grave of the primordial teekkari"), about 3000 years old. Graves of this kind have apparently also been built as memorial for the disappeared, because no bones of the dead were found from this pile. The graves were apparently built on islets, which the Jämeräntaival hill also used to be. Ancient fishermen were active in the area because the main course of the Vantaa river used to flow into the Iso Huopalahti bay at the bottom of Laajalahti at the time.

The etymology of the name "Otaniemi" is not certain. It is thought to have come from the Finnish word "oka" meaning the point of a spear, because of the sharp shape of the peninsula, or from "ohto" meaning a bear, which is also supported by the names of nearby places such as Otsolahti and Karhusaari, or from the Sámi word "outa" meaning a forested lowland. The latter might well be the correct etymology, because in late medieval sources the name Otaniemi also appears as Outnäs, Owttenes or Outenesby (later Otnäs). Because of the diphthong "ou" which is rarely used in Swedish, it can be deduced that there have been southern Sámi people or Tavastians in the area in ancient times. There are also other place names of Sámi ancestry in Espoo, the most notable of which is probably Nuuksio.

The village of Otaniemi, which according to tax documents from 1540 included three houses, originally belonged to Helsingin pitäjä, where the masters of the village often served as jurors in court sessions. During the Russo-Swedish War, in the icy cold winter of 1577 the Tatars attacked the coast of Espoo over the Gulf of Finland and burned the entire village of Otaniemi to the ground. In 1602 the lands were given to the experienced war hero, ensign Daniel Golovachev. The lord of the Turku Castle, Anders Nilsson (Hyttner) received control of the houses in Otaniemi in the 1630s and at that time they formed a unified farmstead for the first time in their history, a manor exempt from equipping cavalry.

The mayor of Helsinki Gabriel Tavast bought Otaniemi in 1653 and almost ten years later in 1662 it was transferred to the state as a manor of the crown. Otaniemi was accepted as a farmstead required to equip cavalry in 1695. The area had already become part of Espoo before this. After the Great Wrath, the lands of Otaniemi were bought by colonel Henrik Wright who had served in the army of King Charles XII of Sweden. This took place in 1734, and thus two new crofts were formed, Björnholm (Karhusaari) at the eastern shore of the Otsolahti bay and Lakör at the point of the Otaniemi peninsula. When the immense construction work of Sveaborg started, the farmstead of Otaniemi was transferred to the ownership of Karl von Numers in 1746.

The construction workers and garrison men of Sveaborg required large amounts of accommodation space, and new residential buildings were built also in the Otaniemi area. One of these so-called military crofts later developed into the Hagalund manor, which still remains at its place, near the Otaniemi water tower. In 1810 the farmstead was split in two between the grandsons of Karl von Numers. One of them received the lands of the Hagalund manor and the other received the farmstead proper with its main building. The Otaniemi manor was later sold in 1832 to banker Johan Norrman, who himself sold the entire property to beer merchant Pavel Sinebrychoff 25 years later. Sinebrychoff then expanded his property and also bought the Hagalund manor in 1859.

After the death of Pavel Sinebrychoff in 1883 the entire area was transferred to his older son Nikolai, who travelled abroad three years later to take care of his health. Control of the area was taken by Nikolai's younger brother Paul, who had married actress Fanny Grahn. The couple moved to the Otaniemi manor in 1904. Their marriage did not result in children. Paul died in 1917 and Fanny died four years later. According to their will, the area was split in 1922. The smaller part (consisting of the current university campus and the Teekkarikylä student residence) was given to director Carl af Forselles, the husband of Fanny's niece, and the larger part, including the Hagalund manor, was given to Fanny's nephew, doctor and tennis player Arne Grahn, also known as the "father" of the district of Westend.

In 1927 the Af Forselles family sold Otaniemi to three private persons, who founded the company Ab Otnäs Gård in the area. In the 1930s ownership of the company was transferred to Kansallis-Osake-Pankki and it was renamed Otaniemi Oy. In 1949 the state of Finland bought an area of about 107 hectares north of Lehtisaarentie from the company, on the initiative of the Helsinki University of Technology. At the same time, the student body of the university acquired about two hectares of land at Otaniemi for the construction of the Teekkarikylä student residence.

The Otaniemi manor and its surroundings make an appearance in Nyrki Tapiovaara's film The Stolen Death (1938), which contains a scene where the cossacks pursue activists and ride right into the courtyard of the manor.

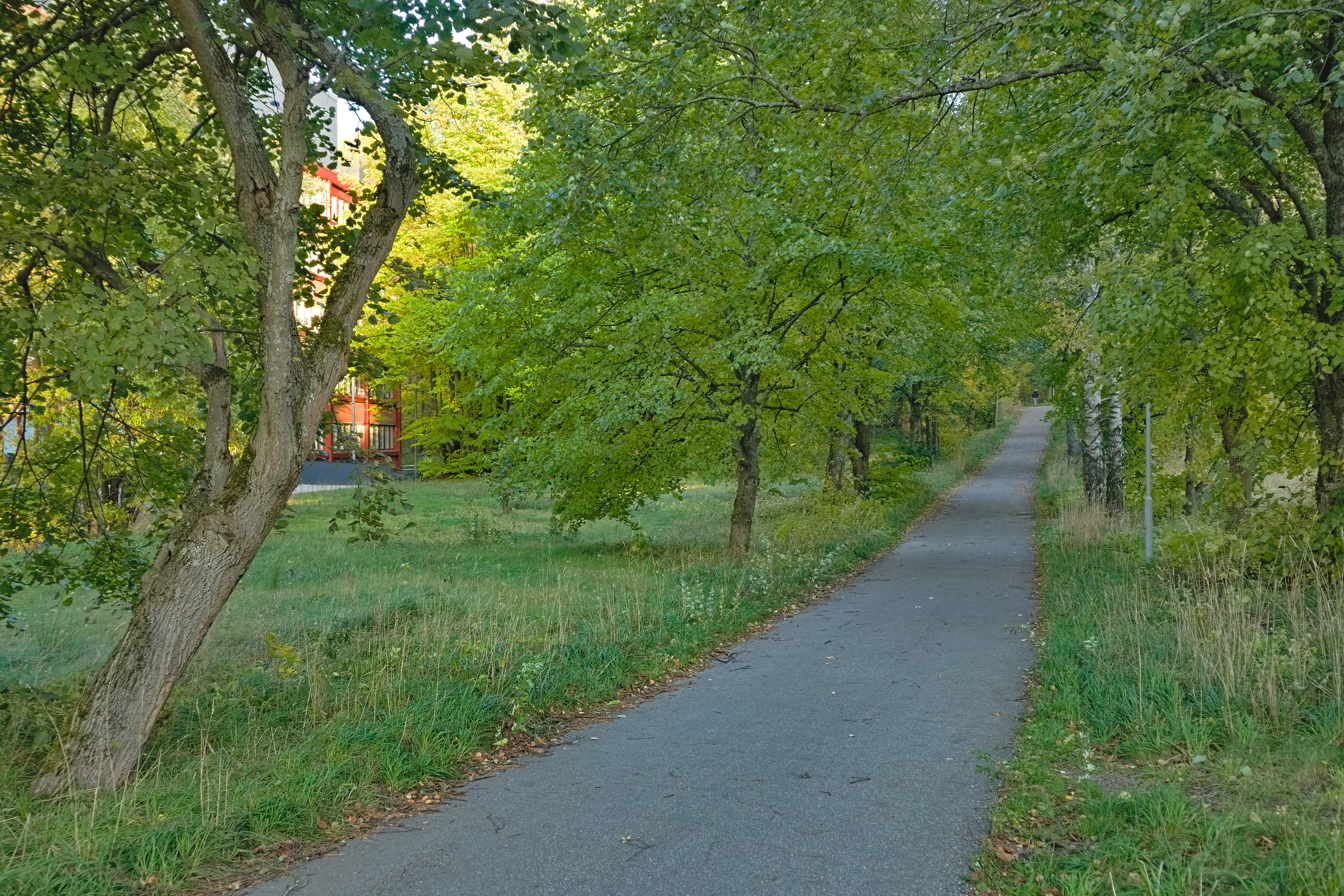
Anna Sinebrychoff's alley at Hagalund Park.

As late as the 1940s, Otaniemi was part of the Hagalund manor and used as a park and farmland, from where an old linden allée survives. In 1949, the Government of Finland purchased the lands of Hagalund Manor for use as the campus of the Helsinki University of Technology and the VTT Technical Research Centre of Finland. First to be built was the student campus of the Helsinki University of Technology, which also served as one of the Olympic Villages in the 1952 Summer Olympics. Several thousand students currently live in Otaniemi. The region has since been built up around TKK and VTT, and is at the core of Finnish scientific and technological activities.

Preparations for the move of the Helsinki University of Technology from the Hietalahdentori square in Helsinki started in the turn of the 1940s and 1950s. Construction of the Teekkarikylä student residence started in 1950. Its first houses, designed by Heikki and Kaija Siren were built in May 1952. Construction materials included bricks that had been taken from the ruins of the embassy of the Soviet Union, which had been destroyed in the bombing of Helsinki during World War II. The Otaniemi Chapel, designed by the same architects, was built 1957. As soon as the houses in Teekkarikylä were completed, they served to accommodate athletes in the 1952 Summer Olympics in Helsinki. Construction of Teekkarikylä and the prominent actions of the teekkari students in 1956 sped up the university's move to Otaniemi from its old, cramped premises in the Helsinki city centre. Construction of the main building of the university started in 1961, when the old manor located at the same time, dating from the late 18th or early 19th century, was dismantled. The main building was completed in 1964 and officially inaugurated in 1966. The VTT Technical Research Centre of Finland moved from Helsinki to Otaniemi at the same time as the university.

The Teekkarikylä residence in Otaniemi also served as accommodation in the 1983 and 2005 World Championships in Athletics. Because of the 2005 championships, construction of new student apartments sped up and right before the event, six new buildings were built into Teekkarikylä at Jämeränaukio and Otaranta.

The Haukilahti gymnasium moved to Otaniemi in autumn 2016. During the autumn semester 2019 the Otaniemi gymnasium with 800 students also started operating in Otaniemi, transferred over from the Pohjois-Tapiola and Olari gymnasiums, which were discontinued.

== Architecture ==
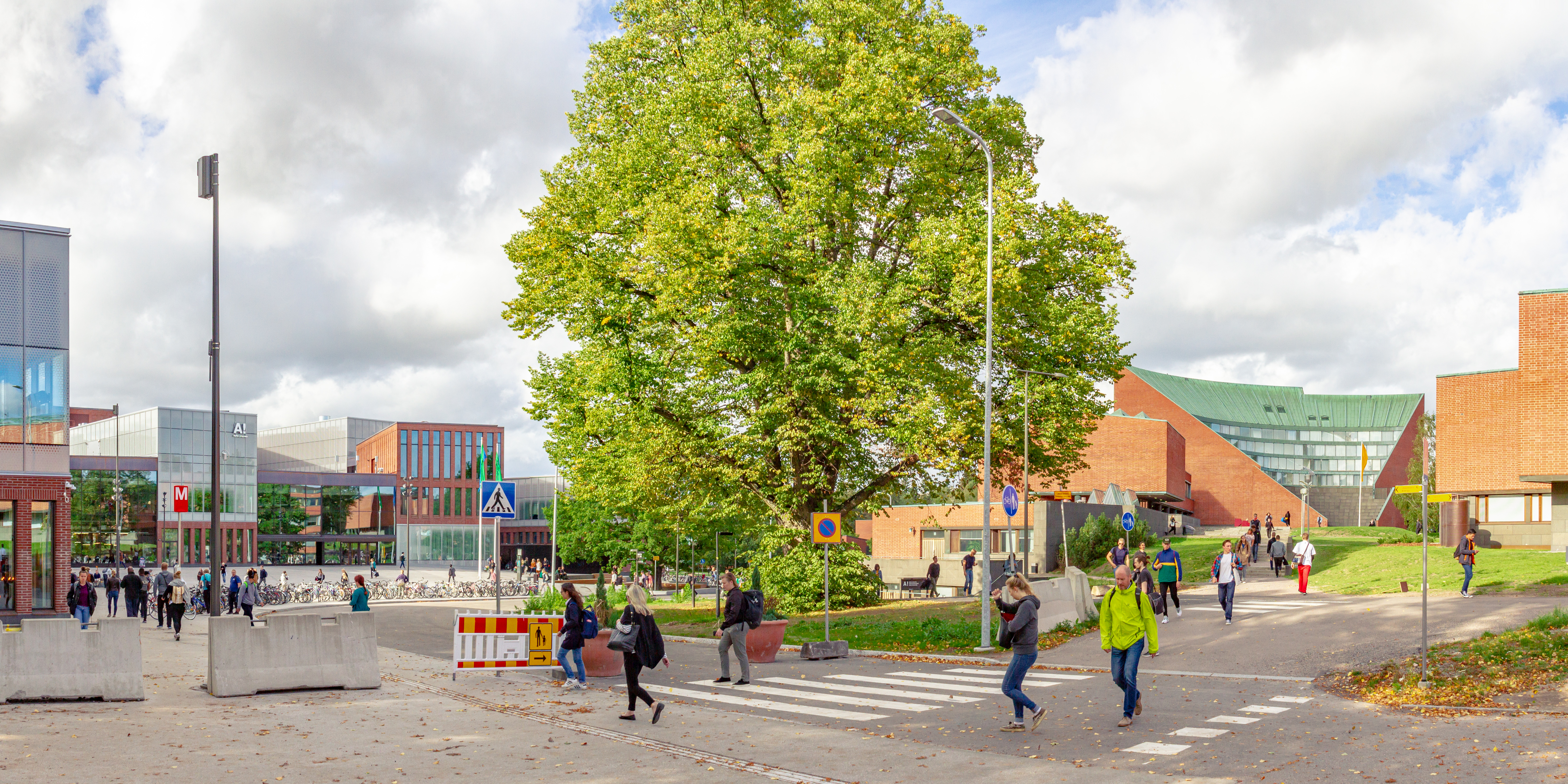
Aalto University in Otaniemi.

The area is architecturally unique, boasting buildings designed by leading Finnish architects including Alvar Aalto, Heikki and Kaija Siren, and Reima and Raili Pietilä. Alvar Aalto was an alumnus of the Helsinki University of Technology (TKK), one of the three merger schools that later formed Aalto University, and the designer of both the city plan for the Otaniemi area and the main building of TKK.

== Demographics ==
Otaniemi hosts a student community especially concentrated in the several blocks of student housing called Teekkarikylä (Swedish: Teknologbyn, literally technology students' village). Some buildings of Teekkarikylä are owned by the student association of Aalto University AYY; others are owned by HOAS. There are very few non-student apartments in Otaniemi, as almost all inhabitants are students. Due to the nature of its demographic, Otaniemi is also the poorest postal code area in Finland: according to an investigation made by Statistics Finland in 2015, the median income per resident was reported to be only 11 062 euros.

== Politics ==
In the 2017 municipal elections, the Liberal Party won one council seat in Espoo; in there, the party's support was greatest in Otaniemi, where it received 6.6 percent of the vote.

== Education ==
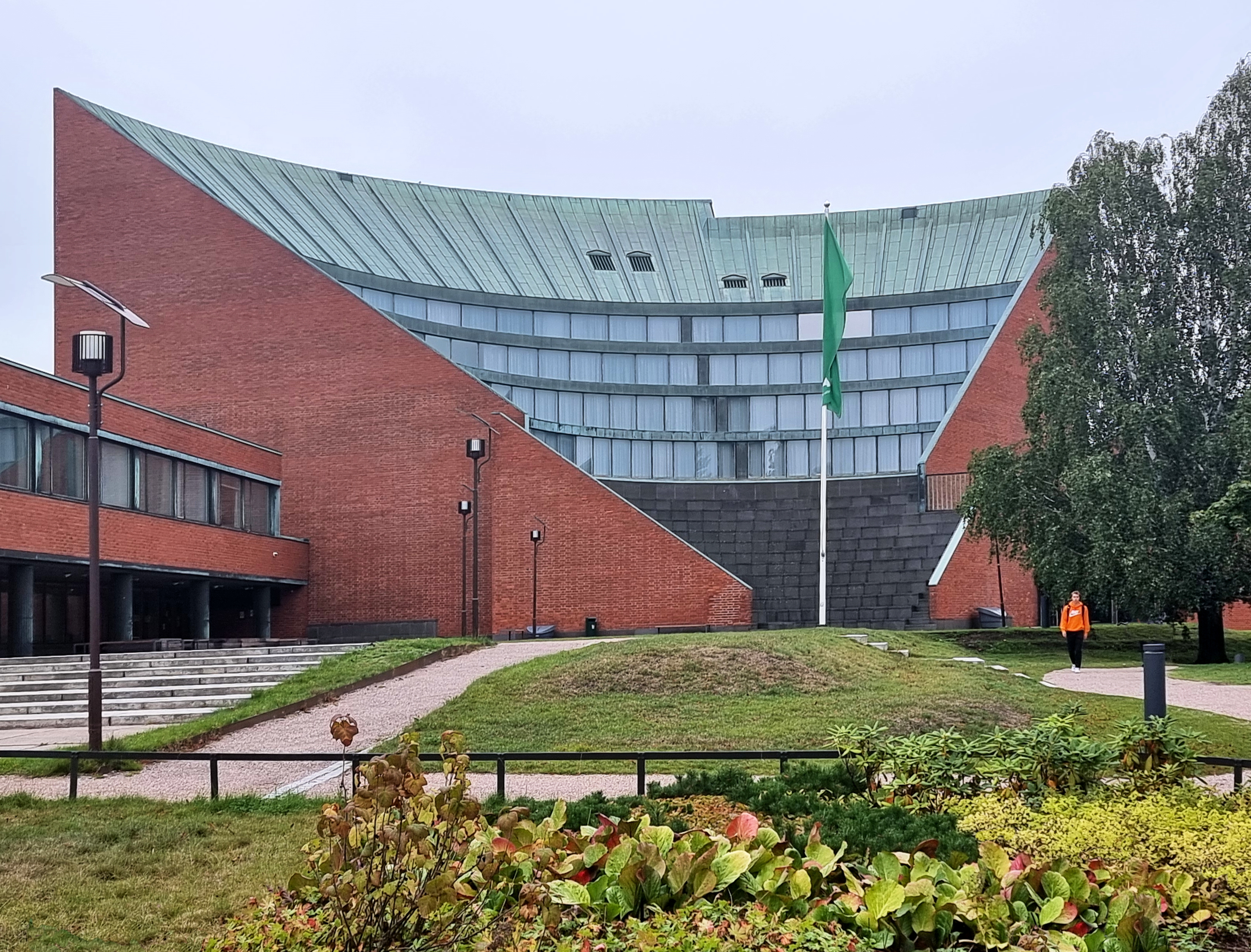
Alvar Aalto's landmark auditorium of the main building of the Otaniemi campus. The amphitheatre-like structure contains the main auditoriums, while its exterior can be used for plays and other activities.

On 1 January 2010, Otaniemi became home to Aalto University, formed from the merger of the Helsinki University of Technology, the University of Art and Design Helsinki, and the Helsinki School of Economics. Art and business teaching has been gradually moved from Aalto's Helsinki locations to Otaniemi. The name is a tribute to Alvar Aalto, a prominent architect known for his achievements in technology, economics, and art.

Otaniemi is also the location of the Border and Coast Guard Academy. Until 2008, the officer school of the Police College of Finland was also located there.

== Research and development ==
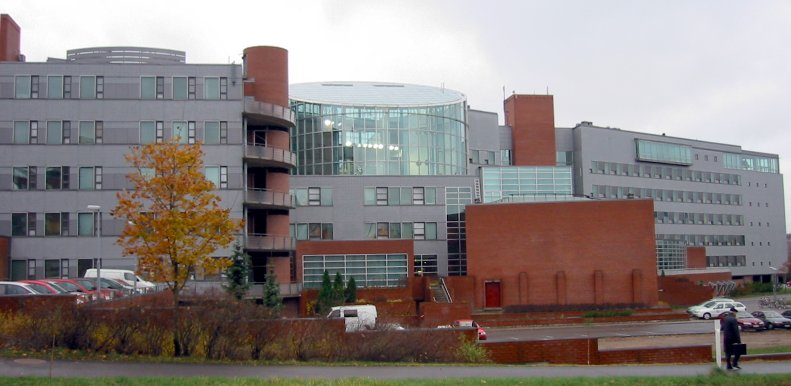
Technopolis's business incubator Innopoli.

Otaniemi is home to many of Finland's research and development organizations: The most prominent institutions for science and engineering in Otaniemi are the Finnish Innovation Center, VTT Technical Research Centre of Finland, the Micronova Center of Micro and Nanotechnology, the KCL pulp and paper research center, the CSC IT Center for Scientific Computing, the Geological Survey of Finland (GTK), and the National Bureau of Measures (MIKES). Helsinki University of Technology's 10 national centers of excellence create most of Finland's hi-tech patents within this small area.

Otaniemi has gained international recognition in information and communication technologies thanks largely to Nokia, but it also contains a host of other cutting-edge technology clusters, including mobility-based software and web-ware, as well as nanotechnology, microelectronics and quantum technology. Major companies that have sites in Otaniemi are for instance Tieto and Pöyry.

The Finnish Customs laboratory is located in Otaniemi.

The district of Otaniemi also includes the area of Keilaniemi, which contains the head offices of Fortum, Neste and Kone. In December 2007 the fifth building of Swing life Center was built in Keilaniemi, making the construction of the centre complete. The Swing Life Center complex currently houses about thirty companies in four interconnected buildings.

== Other features ==
Otaniemi was home to the Border and Coast Guard Academy, Finland, which was discontinued in Otaniemi in 2014 when its activity was concentrated to Imatra. The officer school of the Police University College was located in Otaniemi until 2008.

A new fire station will be constructed in Otaniemi next to the planned students' house as it is not possible to reach the area from elsewhere quickly enough. The new fire station will require a change in the zoning plan and dismantling the current Neste self-service petrol station. The projected price of the building is 5.3 million euro. The city council of Espoo still needs to accept the plan.

Otaniemi has three daycares, a stadium, an indoor arena, and a small shopping mall called A Bloc. The Fat Lizard Brewing Company has had its brewery in Otaniemi since 2017.

== Transport ==
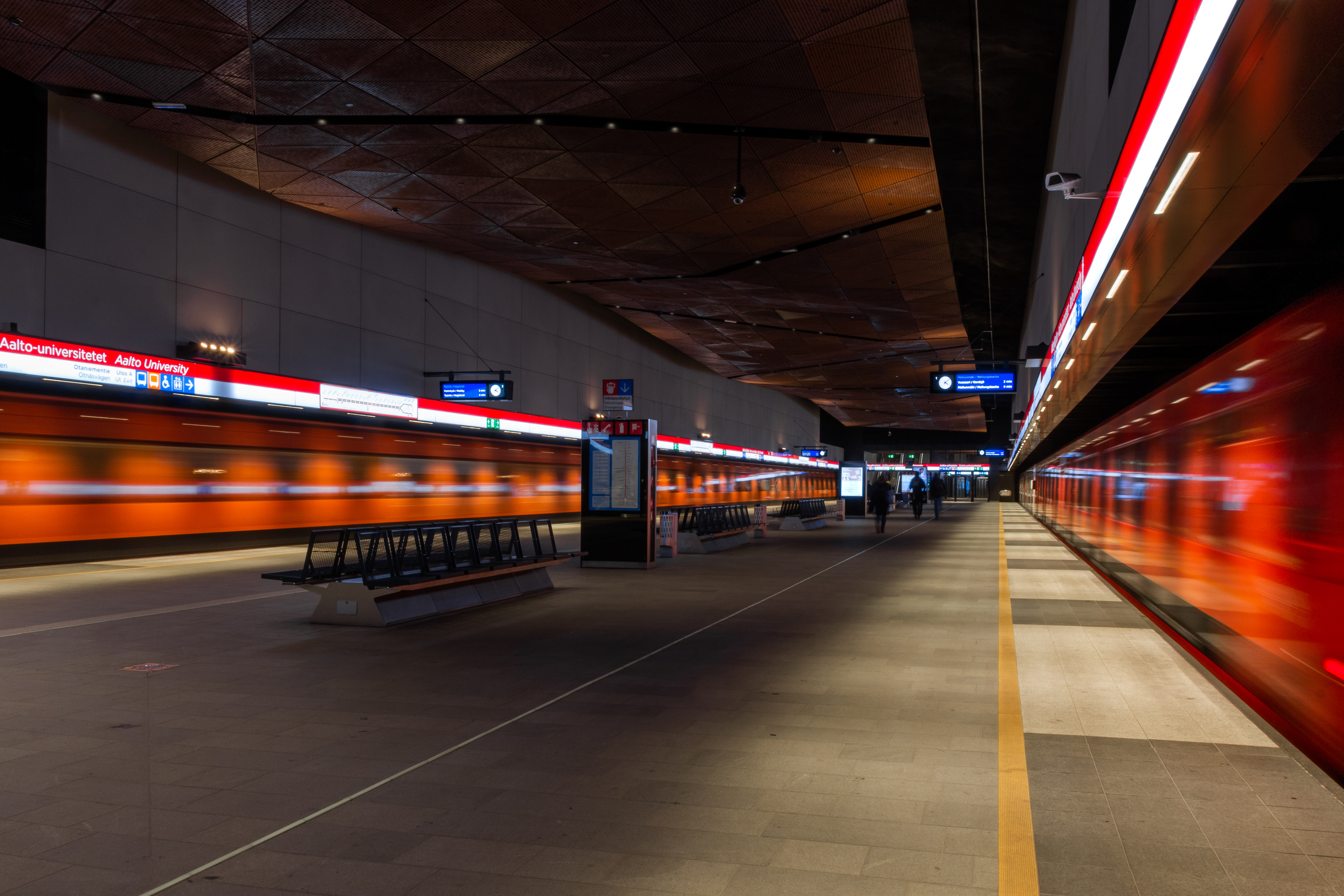
The Aalto University metro station in January 2019.

The Ring I beltway goes past Otaniemi, and the area is located at its end near the Länsiväylä highway. The most direct car connection from the Helsinki city centre to Otaniemi goes via Länsiväylä and the western end of Ring I. Additionally, the street Kuusisaarentie leads from Munkkiniemi in Helsinki to Otaniemi via a chain of islands.

Otaniemi has been connected to the Helsinki Metro since 2017. The Aalto University metro station of the Länsimetro line is located in Otaniemi to the southwest of the main building of the university.

In October 2023, the Raide-Jokeri light rail line (Line 15) opened, connecting Otaniemi directly to both Keilaniemi in Espoo and Itäkeskus in Helsinki, with three stops within Otaniemi. This new light rail line, which replaced the previously busiest bus route in the Helsinki region, has significantly enhanced public transportation accessibility in the area and provides efficient cross-town links for local residents, students, and commuters.

== See also ==
- Otaniemi Chapel
- Otaniemi metro station
