= Espoo Funeral Chapel =

- Espoon siunauskappeli
- Espoo Funeral Chapel in 2026.
- Espoo Funeral Chapel
- 60°12′20″N 24°38′41″E
- Location: Pappilantie 12, Espoo
- Country: Finland
- Denomination: Evangelical Lutheran Church of Finland

History
- Consecrated: 1963

Architecture
- Architect(s): Heikki Siren and Kaija Siren

Specifications
- Capacity: 80

Administration
- Diocese: Diocese of Espoo
- Parish: Espoo Parish Union

Espoo Funeral Chapel (Finnish: Espoon siunauskappeli; Swedish: Esbo begravningskapell) is a Lutheran funeral chapel in central Espoo, Finland, designed by Heikki Siren and Kaija Siren. The chapel and its adjoining cemetery opened in 1963. The chapel contains a crematorium.

== History ==
In the early 1950s, the Espoo parishes purchased the 12.25-hectare Lammas estate for a new cemetery. Heikki Siren was appointed principal designer for the site in 1957, assisted by interior designer Lasse Gestranius and landscape architect Juho Jännes. The chapel plans gained a cremation furnace on 10 March 1958. Rakennuspartio built the chapel under a 35.31-million-Finnish mark contract signed on 7 July 1962. The building was handed over on 16 July 1963. Bishop Martti Simojoki consecrated the chapel and cemetery later that year.

The crematorium entered service on 17 February 1964 as Finland's third crematorium. Cremation became increasingly common thereafter, accounting for more than a third of burials by the late 1970s. A freestanding bell tower and a second furnace were added in 1990–1991.

A major renovation and 500-square-metre extension were carried out in 2014–2015 at an estimated cost of €8.2 million. Work started in November 2013. The crematorium returned to service on 6 July 2015 and the chapel reopened a week later, on 14 July. The scheme added staff welfare, office and storage facilities, including a cold room with 68 places for the deceased, double the previous number. An accessible toilet was built in the lobby. A new flue-gas cleaning system brought the crematorium into line with forthcoming environmental standards. By 2015 the chapel held about 600 funeral services a year, while the crematorium carried out about 1,100 cremations.

== Architecture and facilities ==
Designed by Heikki Siren and Kaija Siren, the chapel is an example of Finnish modernism. Its hall seats 80 and has step-free access.

The interior features Elämän kiertokulku by Bertel Gardberg and, in the urn-collection room, the paper-cord ryijy Saari by Ritva Puotila.

The eight-stop organ was built by Urkurakentamo Veikko Virtanen Oy in 1995.

It has statutory protection under the town plan and is part of Espoo Church Hill, designated by the Finnish Heritage Agency as a nationally significant built cultural environment.

== Chapel Cemetery ==
The Chapel Cemetery in October 2026

Opened in 1963, Chapel Cemetery contains about 4,000 coffin burial plots and 2,600 urn burial plots on a roughly 11-hectare, relatively steep hillside above the chapel. Its grounds include coffin and urn sections, a scattering area and a memorial garden, including a reserved coffin and urn section for Espoo war veterans where new plots are still available. On All Saints' Day, visitors light candles throughout the cemetery.

A 2012 programme created the memorial garden and scattering area, resurfaced paths, renewed lighting and added benches. Ground levels in sections A, B and C and parts of I and L were raised by 30 centimetres, where clay soils had slowed decomposition and delayed reuse of graves.

The cemetery employs six permanent staff, joined by about 25 seasonal workers in summer. Families can arrange maintenance through the parish union's cemetery office. Contracted maintenance runs from early June to late September under the grave-maintenance fund's rules. In 2024 the Chapel, Kellonummi and Church cemeteries jointly sought 70 summer workers, chiefly to mow grass on contract-maintained graves and plant flowers.

== See also ==
- Espoo Cathedral
- Kellonummi Chapel
- Kellonummi Cemetery
- Crematoria in Finland
