= Innopoli =

Office building in Espoo, Finland

Coordinates: 60.184°N 24.814°E

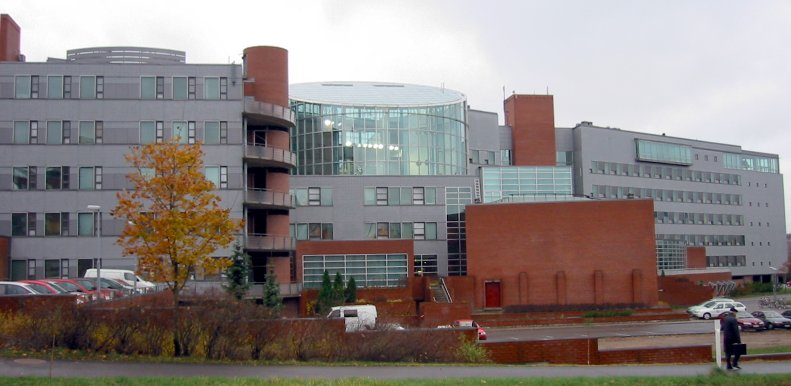
Innopoli

Innopoli is a large office building in the district of Otaniemi, Espoo, Finland, near the main campus of the Aalto University, constructed in 1991. Innopoli provides housing for many information technology companies, and some well-known, successful companies such as SSH Communications have started there. A newer office building, called Innopoli 2, was constructed later near the original Innopoli building in 2002. Both buildings were designed by Kaarina Löfström.
