= Johan Sigfrid Sirén =

Finnish architect

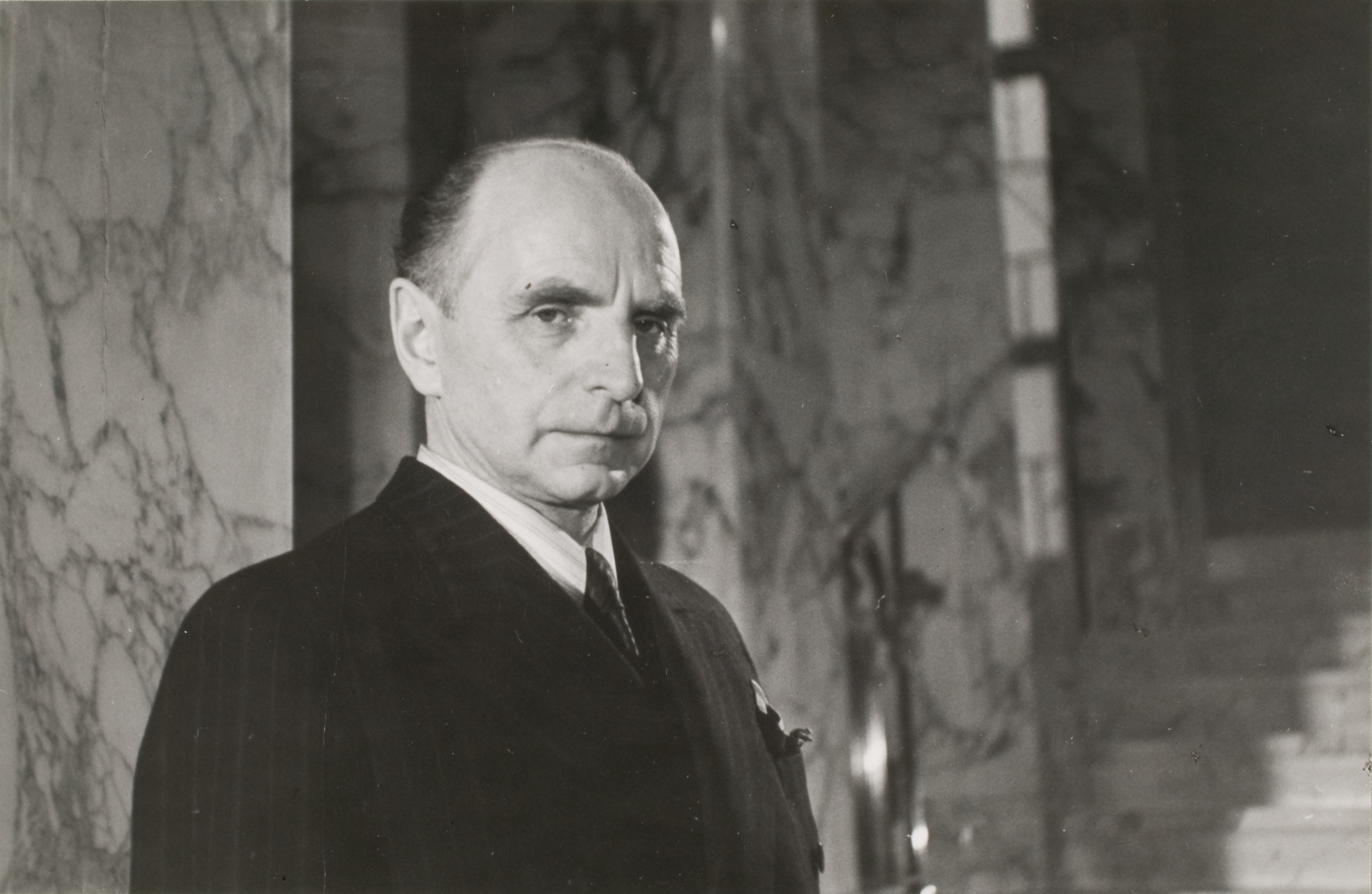
Johan Sigfrid Sirén

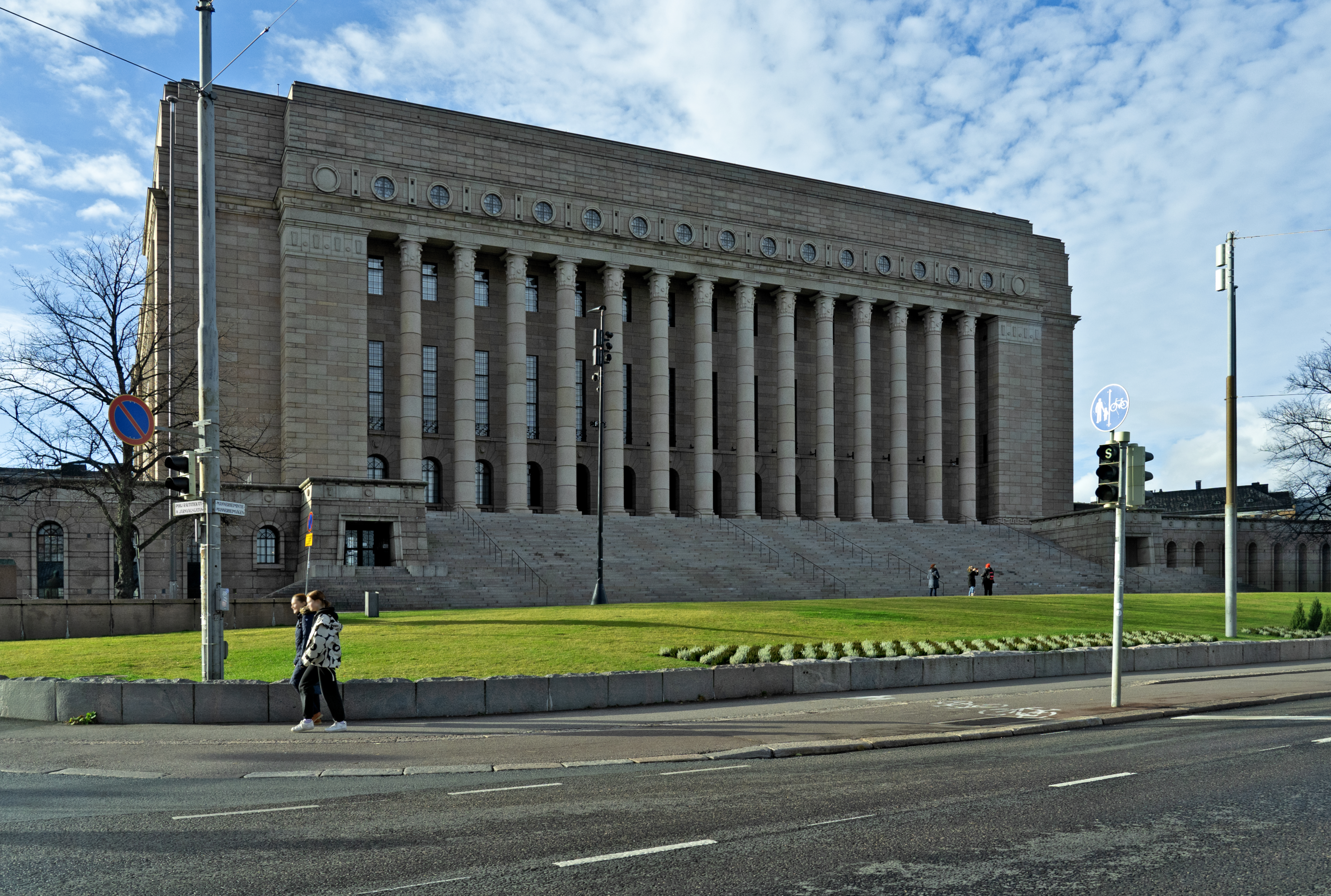
Parliament House (1931)

Johan Sigfrid Sirén (27 May 1889 – 5 March 1961) was a Finnish architect. He is best known for designing the Parliament House, the seat of Parliament of Finland.

== Career ==
Sirén was born in 1889 in Ylihärmä. In 1907, he graduated from high school and started his studies at the Helsinki University of Technology. After receiving his diploma in 1913, Sirén worked for Jung & Fabritius until 1917. In 1918, he founded an office with Kaarlo Borg and Urho Åberg. In 1924, they won a contest for the design of the Parliament House of Finland. The three soon parted ways and Sirén continued work on the Parliament House alone. During the construction period from 1926 to 1931, he acted as a supervisor.

Sirén went on to hold his own office, and his later work included the expansion of the main building of the University of Helsinki. In 1931, Sirén was also appointed a professor of architecture at the Helsinki University of Technology. He retired from the position in 1957, and died in Helsinki in 1961. He is buried in the Hietaniemi Cemetery in Helsinki.

Sirén's son Heikki Siren was also a renowned architect, as was his daughter-in-law Kaija Siren.
