= Lumber yard =

Site of wood processing or storage

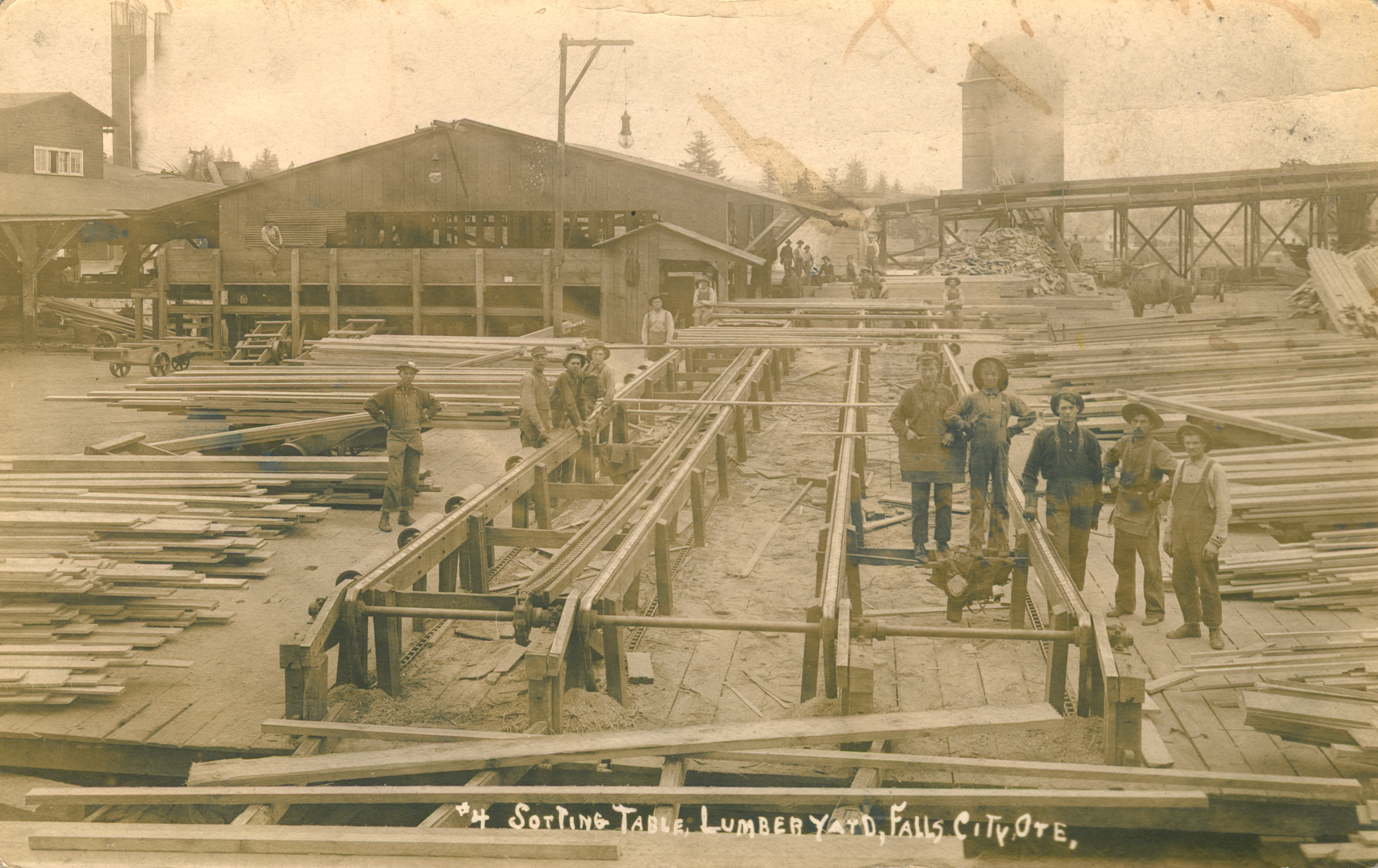
A lumber yard sorting table in Falls City, Oregon

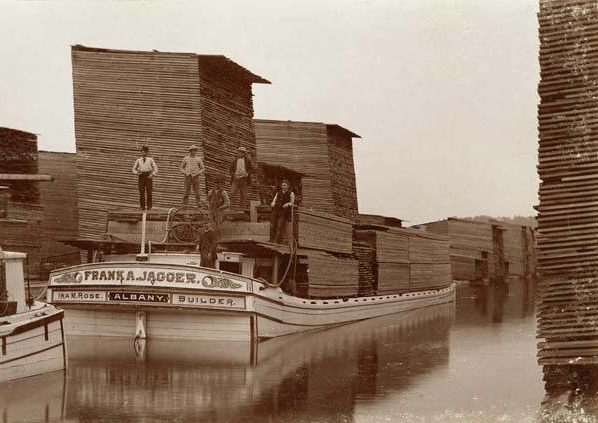
Frank A. Jagger loads his boat full of lumber at the Albany Lumber District in Albany, New York in the 1870s

A lumber yard (or lumberyard) is a location where lumber and wood-related products used in construction and/or home improvement projects are processed or stored. Some lumber yards offer retail sales to consumers, and some of these may also provide services such as the use of planers, saws and other large machines.

Generally, timber yards are locations where raw logs and other wood or forest products are processed and stored. The terms "lumber yard" and "timber yard" are sometimes used interchangeably, and timber yards may include additional aspects that lumber yards encompass, and vice versa.

== Overview ==
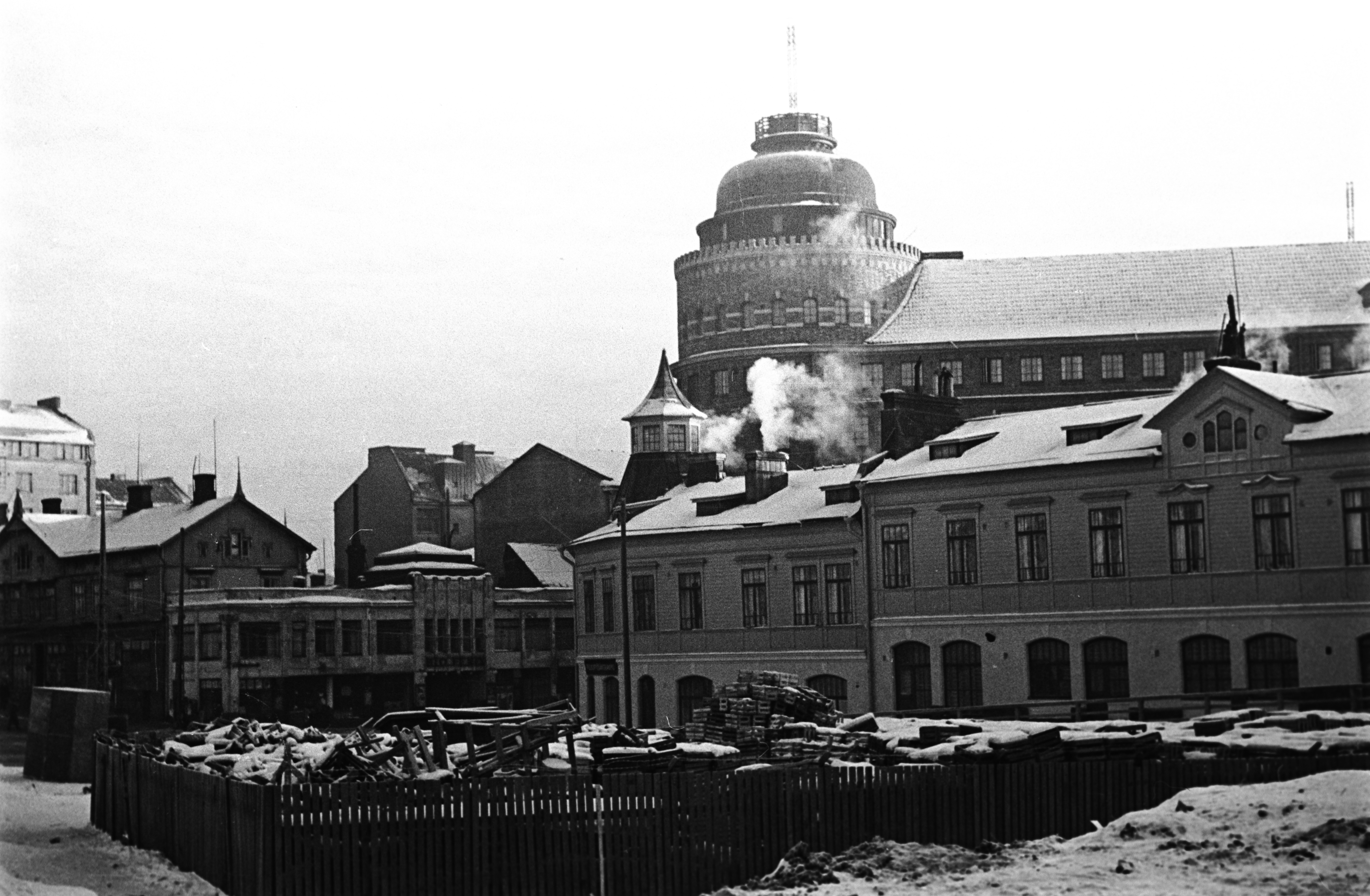
Buildings and a fenced lumber yard (on the site of the current Ympyrätalo) in Helsinki, Finland in the 1950s

Lumber yards sell products made at lumber mills, where customers pick up products at the yard themselves or request that an order be built and delivered to them by the lumber yard. Lumber yards may also sell wood-plastic composites, such as Trex, any other type of construction material or supplies, and general hardware store items. Lumber yards are the primary resources for contractors and homeowners when construction material is needed. Some big box stores, such as Home Depot, Lowe's, and Menards, also have lumber sections, but this may not be considered a lumber yard, although it serves the same purpose. Lumber yards use forklift trucks to move the large heavy units of lumber around the yard. Saws may also be available to cut boards to a desired length for customers.

At timber yards (also sometimes referred to as lumber yards), logs and other forest products are processed and stored. Additional activities include inspection for signs of rot, utilizing stacking techniques to prevent rot from forming, and the removal of bark and spraying of pesticides to prevent insect infestation. Some lumber/timber yards use cranes to move logs, and sprinklers to keep the logs moist.

== By country ==
=== United Kingdom ===
==== England ====
Ransfords, located in Shropshire, England, operates one of the largest timber yards in Europe, and processes 70,000 tonnes of logs annually.

=== United States ===
==== Products ====
Some lumber yards sell products that are assessed and certified by the Forest Stewardship Council's (FSC), per its standards. One lumber yard in Portland, Oregon limits its product line to only those that meet or exceed FSC's requirements. In 2008, Sustainable Northwest, a nonprofit environmental group in Portland, Oregon, began operations sourcing and purveying environmentally friendly "green wood" products. The group specializes in offering wood products that are sourced from trees in non-threatened forests.

==== Fires ====
In the United States, the National Fire Protection Association has been documenting incidences of lumber yard fires since 1998. Products at lumber yards are very prone to fires, and electrical problems at lumber yards are a significant cause of fires. In Murray, Utah, after a large lumber yard fire caused approximately US$1 million in damage at the CECO Concrete Construction company, city residents called for companies in the city to take further preventative actions to prevent fires from occurring. In some cities, such as Phoenix, Arizona, city fire protection and prevention codes for lumber yards exist.

== History ==
In Sydney, Australia, convicts have worked at a place called "The Lumber Yard" as a part of serving their sentences, to facilitate lumber and product production and to provide convicts with skills training. A timber yard that was associated with The Lumber Yard was also in operation, where workers pulled and stacked logs floated downstream on the Lane Cove River. The Lumber Yard was a government lumber yard, and operated as such from circa 1791 to 1834.

== See also ==
- Logging
- Sawmill

== Bibliography ==
- Beckett, Gordon (2013). The Coghlan Factor. Trafford Publishing. pp. 125–132. ISBN 149070020X
