= Coast guard academy =

Military academy that trains members of a coast guard

A coast guard academy is a military academy that trains members of a coast guard, typically at the national level.

Examples of coast guard academies include:

- Canadian Coast Guard College, founded in 1965, based in Westmount, Nova Scotia
- Border and Coast Guard Academy, Finland
- Indian Coast Guard Academy, currently under construction in Azhikkal, Kannur, Kerala
- Japan Coast Guard Academy, founded in 1951, based in Kure, Hiroshima
- Korea Maritime and Ocean University established in November 1945, based in Busan
- United States Coast Guard Academy, founded in 1876, based in New London, Connecticut
