= Fat Lizard =

Finnish craft brewery

Fat Lizard Brewing Company Oy
- Type: Osakeyhtiö
- Industry: Beverage
- Founded: 10 December 2013; 12 years ago
- Headquarters: Espoo, Finland
- Area served: Finland
- Key people: Eero Kukko, Heikki Ylinen, Tuomas Koskipää, Topi Kairenius.
- Revenue: ▲€4.3 million (2022)
- Net income: ▲€15,000 (2022)
- Number of employees: 22
- Website: fatlizard.beer

Fat Lizard is a Finnish craft brewery founded in Espoo in 2014. The CEO of the brewery is Jussi Arposalo. The brewery started operating in Kivenlahti with an annual production of 30,000 litres. Nowadays the premises of the brewery are in Otaniemi. In 2020, the brewery estimated its annual production to exceed 500,000 litres. In 2021 over 1 million liters of beer was produced by the brewery.

== History ==
The company founders Heikki Ylinen and Tuomas Koskipää started brewing beer in 2013 in Koskipää's garage in Kattilalaakso, Espoo using a 20-litre vat. After having reached a repeatable process, the brewery moved to Kivenlahti in late 2014. In Kivenlahti, the founders built a 300-litre brewing machine from old industrial kitchen parts, which could brew 30,000 litres of beer per year. The first beer to be sold in restaurants was brewed in 2015.

In 2017, the brewery moved to its current premises in Otaniemi. There the company acquired a 6000-litre brewing machine, which reached a yearly production of 300,000 litres. The Otaniemi premises allowed the company to expand to canned beer sold in retail in addition to tap beer sold in restaurants.

From 2014 to 2020 the CEO of the brewery was Heikki Ylinen and from 2021 to 2022 Eero Kukko.

== Brand ==
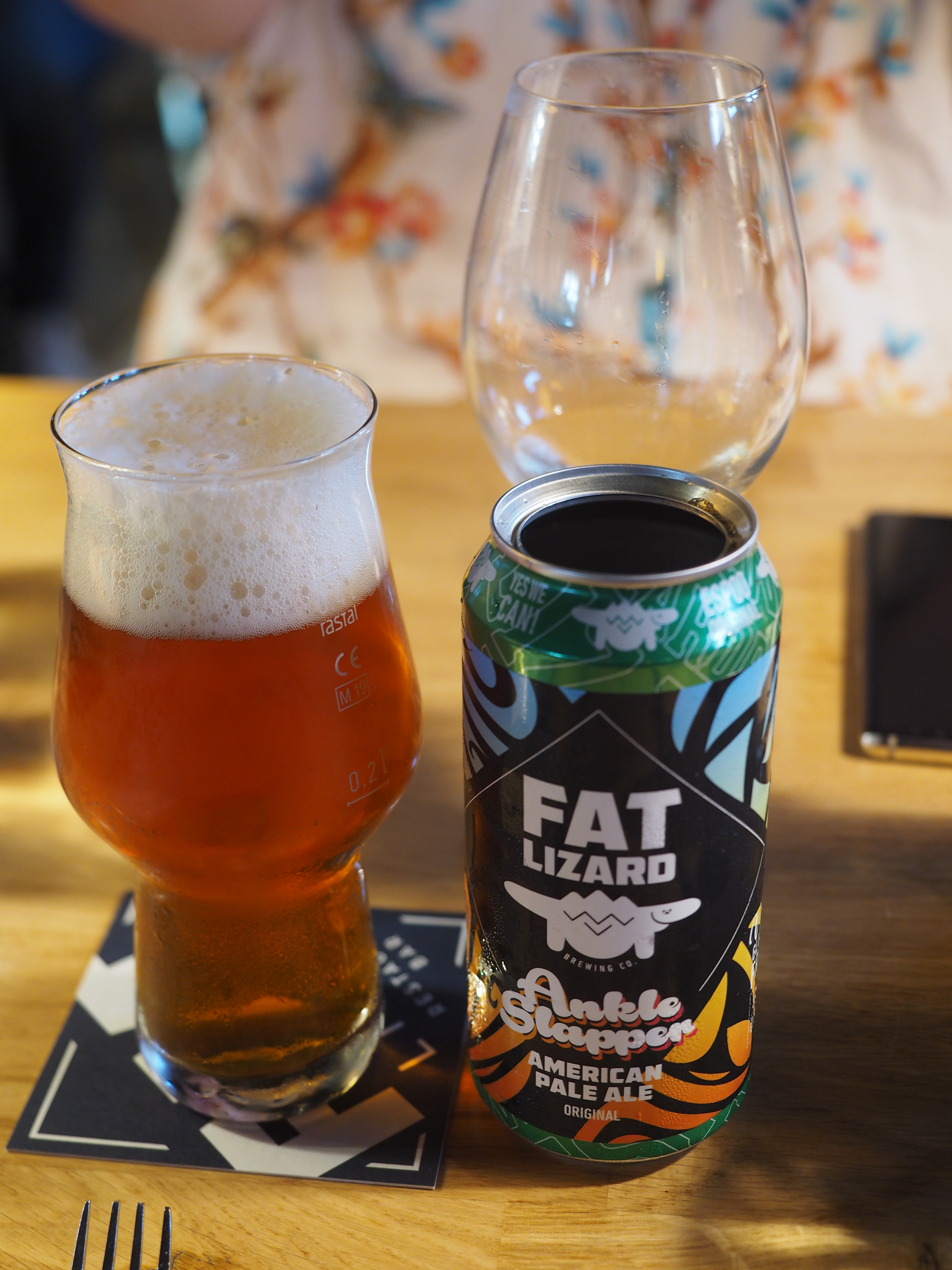
Fat Lizard Ankle Slapper

Fat Lizard has been built consciously as a recognisable brand. According to founder Ylinen "the first beer is bought because of the brand, the next ones because of the taste". The company puts effort to be visible in social media, where it tries to evoke a laid-back feeling.

The company sponsors two beach volley playing sisters from the Helsinki University of Technology, Team Fat Lizard Metsäkoivu/Metsäkoivu.

== Products ==
The company started focusing on American-style beers "because American-style beers should be consumed fresh. Shipped here they are never fresh". According to Fat Lizard, the brewery brews beers its employees themselves want to drink. The company focuses on technical skill and knowledge of the equipment and process in brewing beer. Some of the beers are seasonal products and some are available all year round. The company produces an annual batch of Glims beer made from hops from Espoo, which is typically sold out in a flash.

== Awards ==
=== Suomen Paras Olut ===
Fat Lizard Track Day IPA 5.5% won the "Suomen Paras Olut" ("Finland's Best Beer") award in the category "American-style light and middle-dark ale" in 2016. Fat Lizard Ankle Slapper Surf Ale 5.2% won the same category in 2019.

== Functions ==
=== Brewery shop ===
Since 2018, the brewery has upheld a brewery shop for buying beer to take away. After exceeding an annual production of 500,000 litres, the Finnish alcohol law prohibits the company from selling beers over 5.5% to take away.

=== Taproom ===
The company opened a taproom adjacent to its brewery at the end of 2020 to allow for consuming stronger products in-house. After the COVID-19 pandemic caused delays to the initial founding schedule of the taproom, the company has a Biergarten beer terrace on its courtyard which opened in summer 2020.

The company plans on focusing on selling its own beers in the taproom. The company also plans on importing such special beers from the United States that its employees themselves are interested in tasting.

=== Partner restaurants ===
The company has three partner restaurants, one in Espoo and two smaller ones in Helsinki. Since 2018, restaurant Fat Lizard Otaniemi has been functioning a short walk away from the brewery. In 2020, the company opened a second restaurant in Herttoniemi. The company opened a third restaurant in central Helsinki in December 2020.

== Van theft ==
In summer 2020, a van full of beer was stolen from the company courtyard. The chairman of the board Tuomas Koskipää stopped the theft by driving his 1977 Chevrolet Corvette in front of the van. The incident attracted considerable media attention. Later the company honoured the incident with a new beer named Vigilante Mission New England IPA as a playful reference to popular culture. The name is probably an allusion to the Grand Theft Auto missions where the player plays a law enforcement officer chasing criminals.
