= HOAS =

HOAS may refer to:

- Helsingin seudun opiskelija-asuntosäätiö, a student housing provider in Helsinki, Finland
- Higher-order abstract syntax, representing the abstract syntax of a programming language
