= Brucknerhaus =

Concert hall in Linz, Austria

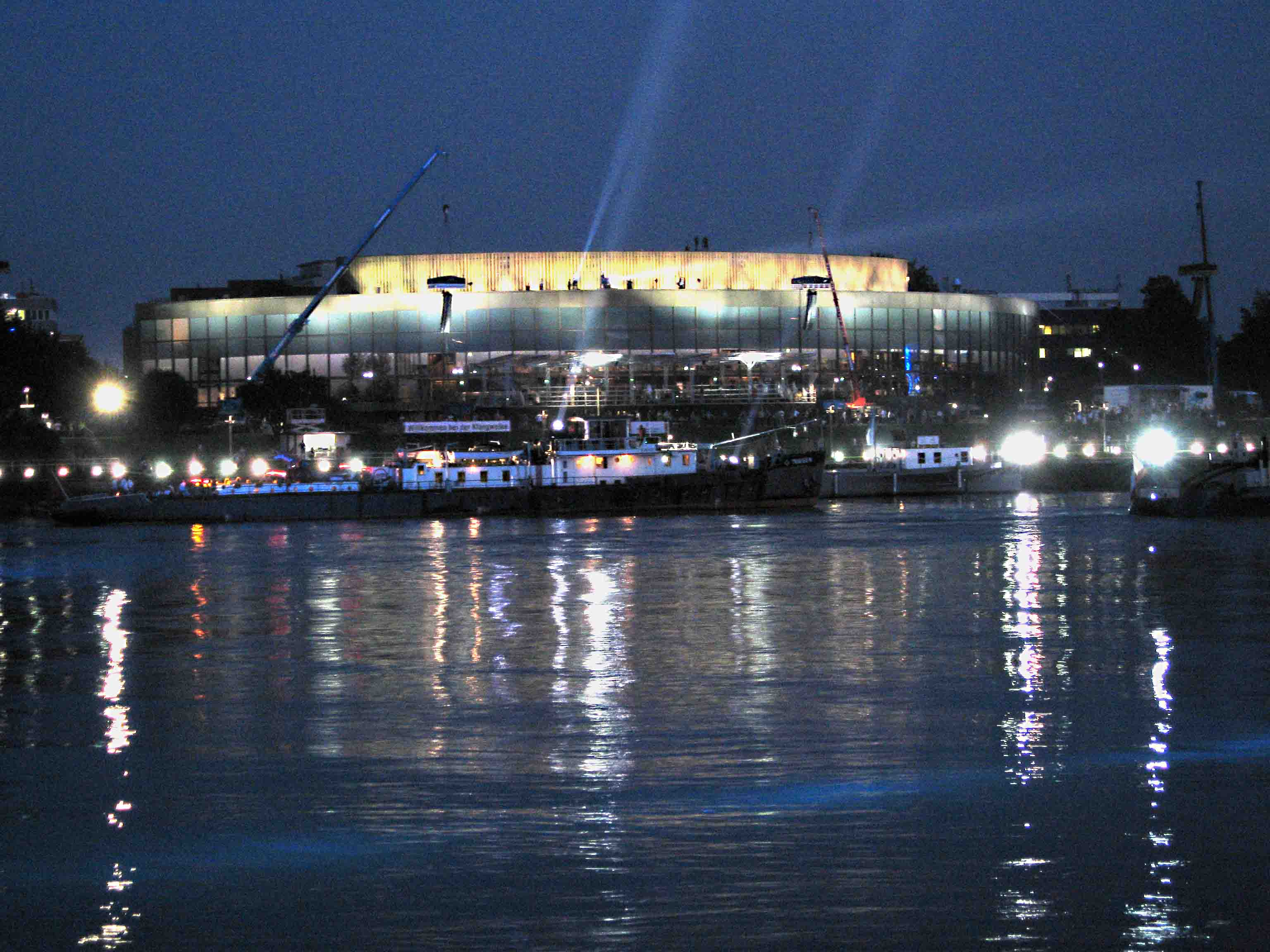
- Brucknerhaus
- Interactive map of Brucknerhaus
- Location: Linz, Austria
- Coordinates: 48°18′37″N 14°17′33″E
- Type: Festival and congress centre

Construction
- Built: 1969-1973
- Opened: 23 March 1974
- Architects: Heikki and Kaija Siren

Website
- https://www.brucknerhaus.at/en

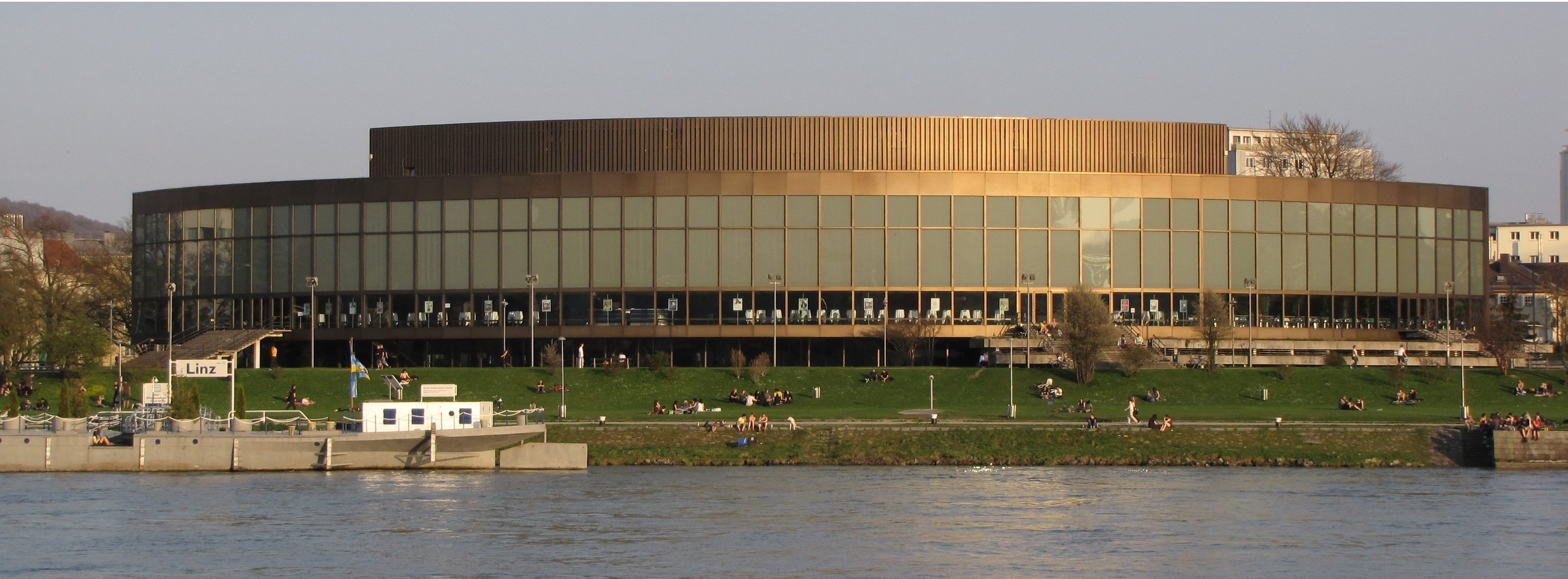
Brucknerhaus in the light of the evening sun

The Brucknerhaus (German pronunciation: [ˈbʁʊknɐˌhaʊs]) is a festival and congress centre in Linz, Austria named after the Austrian composer Anton Bruckner. The building was designed by Finnish architects Heikki and Kaija Siren. Its construction took place from 1969 to 1973. It was opened on 23 March 1974 with Herbert von Karajan leading the Vienna Philharmonic in a performance of Bruckner's Symphony No. 7.

It holds about 200 performances per year, with a yearly attendance of about 180,000. It is home to the International Brucknerfest Linz and the Linzer Klangwolke, two annual musical events.

Brucknerhaus has three main halls:

- Large or Brucknersaal (named after Anton Bruckner): 1,420 seats, standing room for 150;
- Middle or Stiftersaal (named after Adalbert Stifter): 352 seats, standing room for 40;
- Small or Keplersaal (named after Johannes Kepler): 100–150 seats.
