= Ympyrätalo =

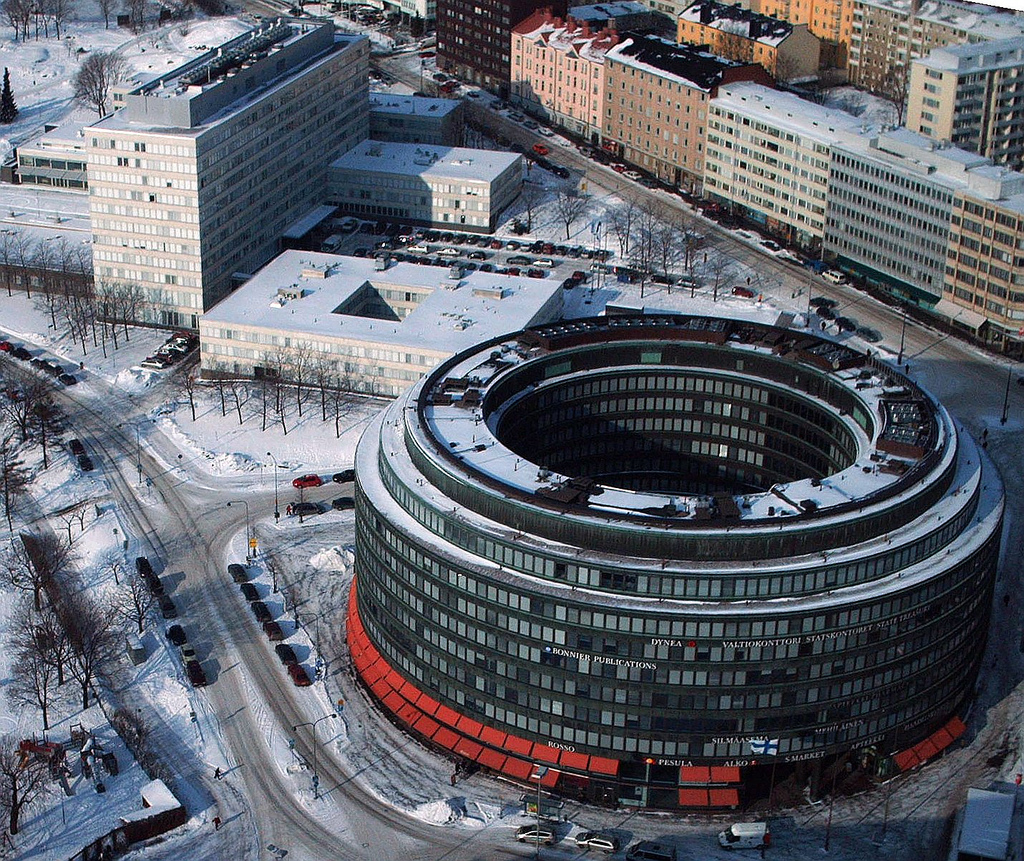
- An aerial view of Ympyrätalo. The white Kallio administrative building in the background is by the same architects.
- Interactive map of the Ympyrätalo area

General information
- Type: Office and commercial building
- Location: Siltasaarenkatu 18–20, Helsinki, Finland
- Coordinates: 60°10′49″N 24°56′55″E
- Construction started: 1960
- Completed: 1968
- Renovated: 2002–2004

Design and construction
- Architects: Heikki and Kaija Siren

Ympyrätalo (Swedish: Cirkelhuset; lit. "Circle House") is a circle-shaped office building located in the Hakaniemi district of Helsinki, Finland. The building is a local landmark.

== History ==
Before Ympyrätalo was built, the block outlined by Siltasaarenkatu, Eläintarhantie and Porthaninrinne contained several wooden houses and a couple of stone buildings, such as the Wendt House which was designed by Gustaf Estlander and completed in 1903. All these buildings were demolished to make room for Ympyrätalo.

Ympyrätalo was designed by architects Heikki and Kaija Siren and work lasted eight years. It opened in 1968. It originally served as offices for Kansallis-Osake-Pankki. Outside the building are three booths that functioned as a drive-through bank until its closure in the 1970s due to low demand.

The building's architecture has been seen as a high point in 1960s Finnish office building architecture as other buildings of the decade, such as the Säästökulma building by Antero Pernaja, the Scandinavian Bank building and the Helsinki Telephone headquarters, were considered to be mediocre by comparison. At the same time Ympyrätalo, as well as the neighboring Kallio administrative building (1965) by the same architects, has been polarizing with its monumentality. Before completing these buildings the Siren architects had created a small stage for the Finnish National Theatre (1954) as well as being entrusted with the plans for the renovation of Helsinki Cathedral (1961–1963). The local architects went on to design important buildings in Paris, Japan, Austria and Iraq.

Ympyrätalo was renovated in the early 2000s to comply with modern technical and functional standards. The renovation project was completed in 2004. One of the architects responsible for the renovation was Jukka Siren, son of the Sirens who designed the building. The building's exterior, entrances, inner courtyard and stairways are protected by a zoning ordinance.

The building is currently owned by the insurance company Ilmarinen and tenants include an S-Market grocery store, an Alko liquor store, a Mehiläinen private clinic and a pharmacy.

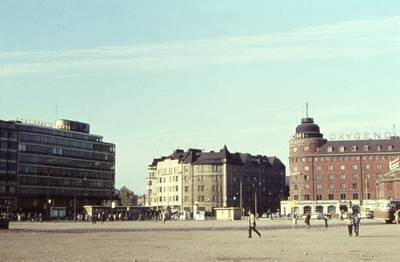
Hakaniemi Square in 1961. The Wendt House in the middle was later torn down to make room for Ympyrätalo.

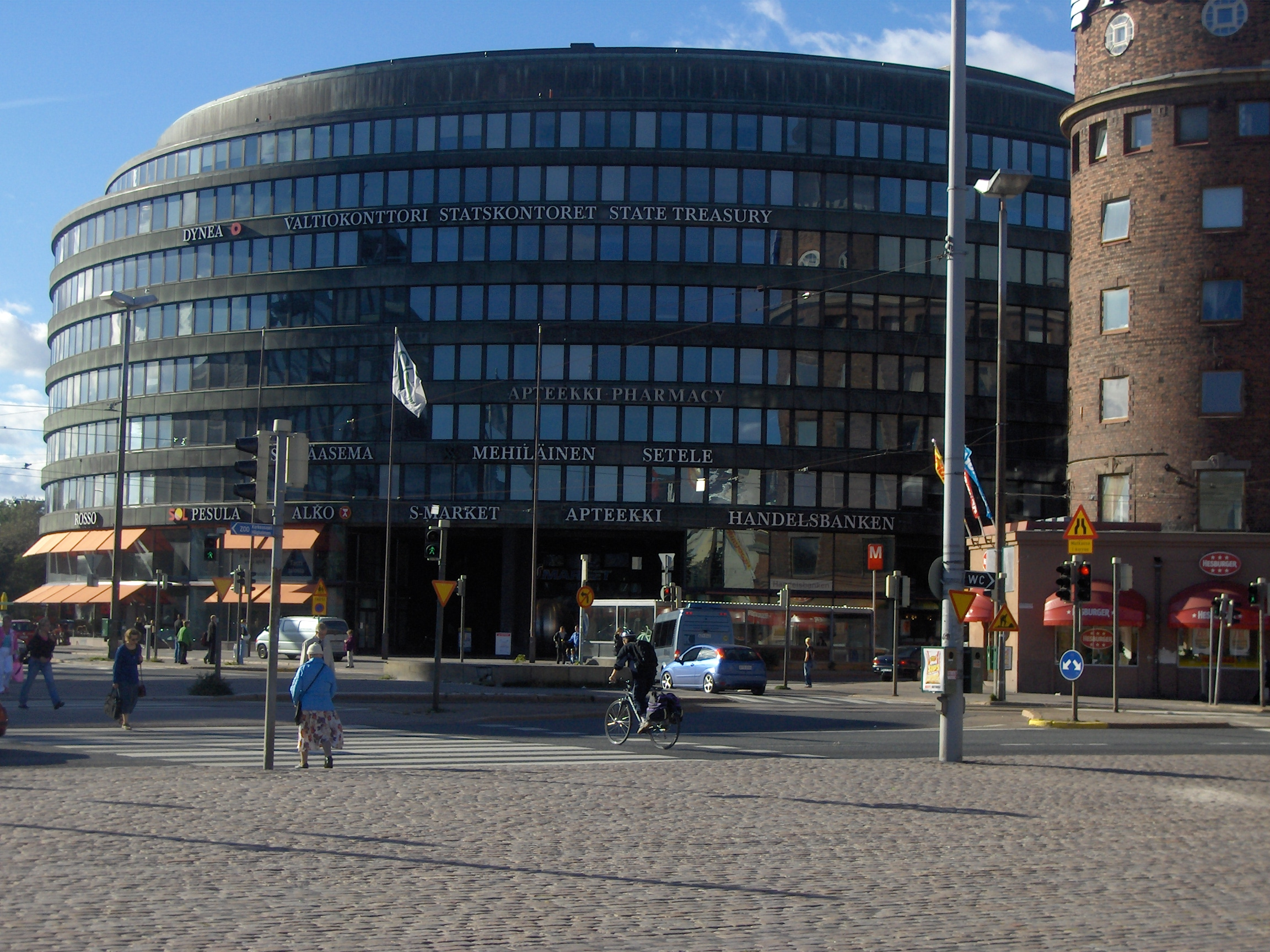
Ympyrätalo viewed from Hakaniemi Square.

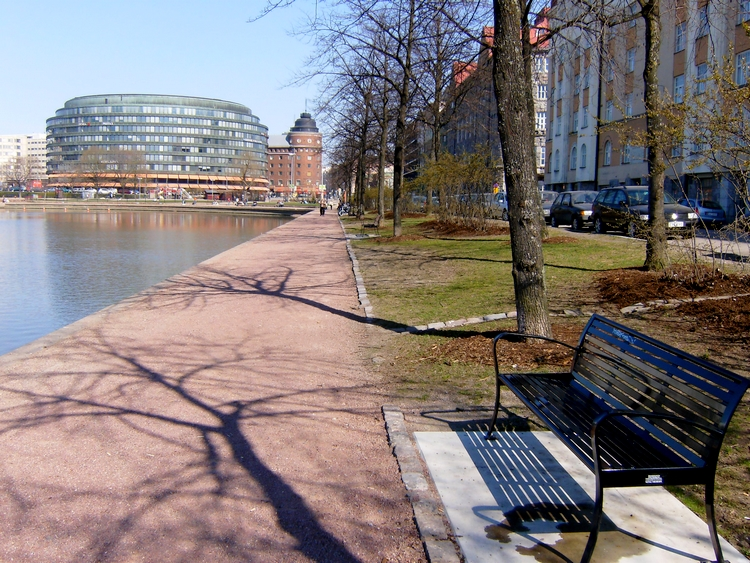
View to Ympyrätalo from Säästöpankinranta.

== Transport connections ==
Entrances to Hakaniemi metro station of the Helsinki Metro are located just outside Ympyrätalo. It has been suggested that the metro station could be directly connected to Ympyrätalo in the future but these plans have so far been postponed. Tram lines 1, 3, 6, 7 and 9 pass by Ympyrätalo. The nearby bus stops are serviced by numerous local and regional bus lines driving Hämeentie to and from the Rautatientori terminus, including bus 615 to Helsinki Airport.

== Public art ==
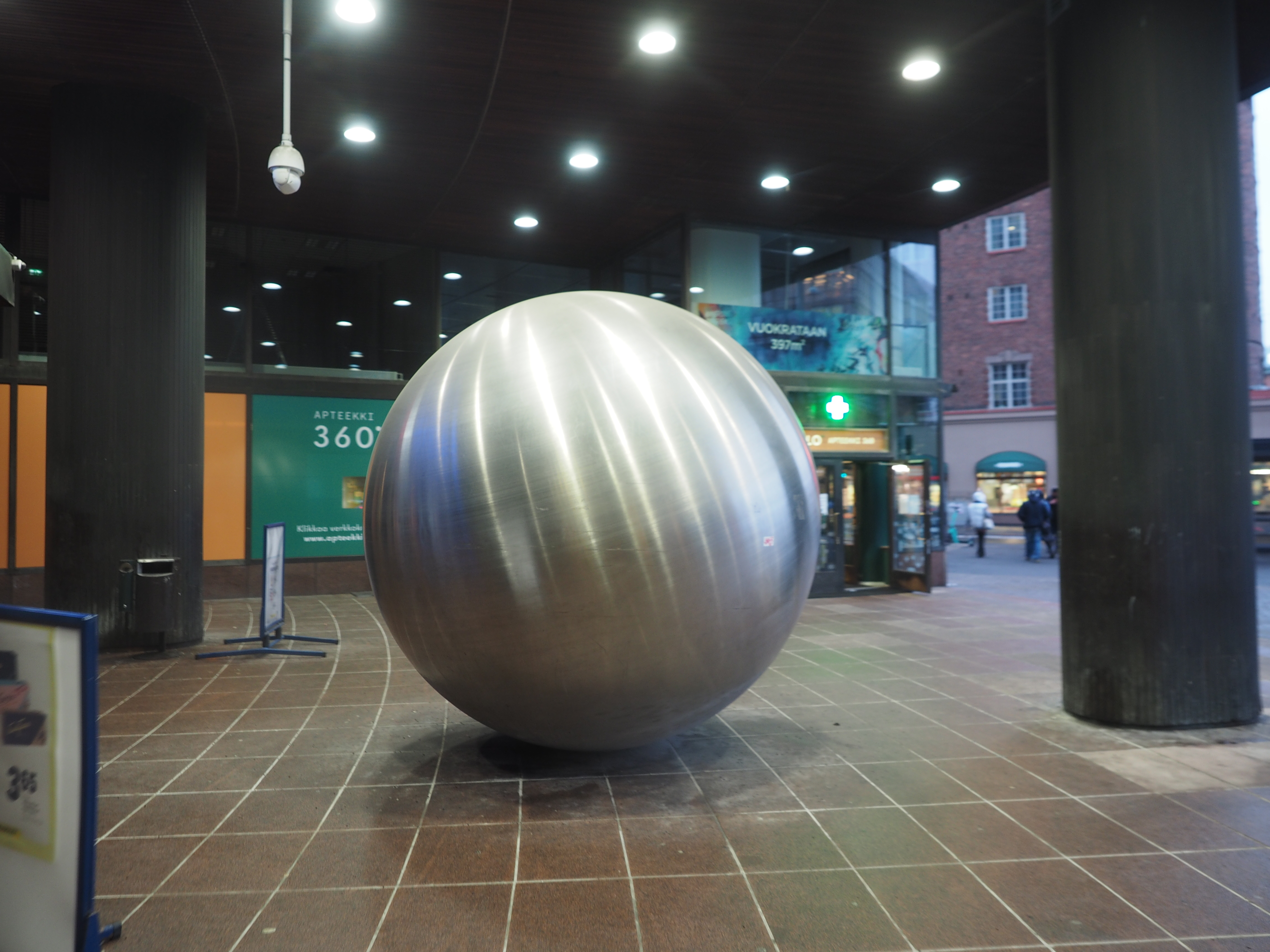
"The Symbol" is a 3-meter steel ball in front of the main entrance to Ympyrätalo.

Ympyrätalo features a minimalist sculpture called "The Symbol": a 3-meter steel ball designed by Hannu Siren, the son of the architects Heikki and Kaija Siren, and installed in 1985 to one of the building's entrances.

== See also ==
- Otaniemi Chapel
