= Otaniemi Chapel =

Chapel in Espoo, Finland

Coordinates: 60°11′22″N 24°50′14″E

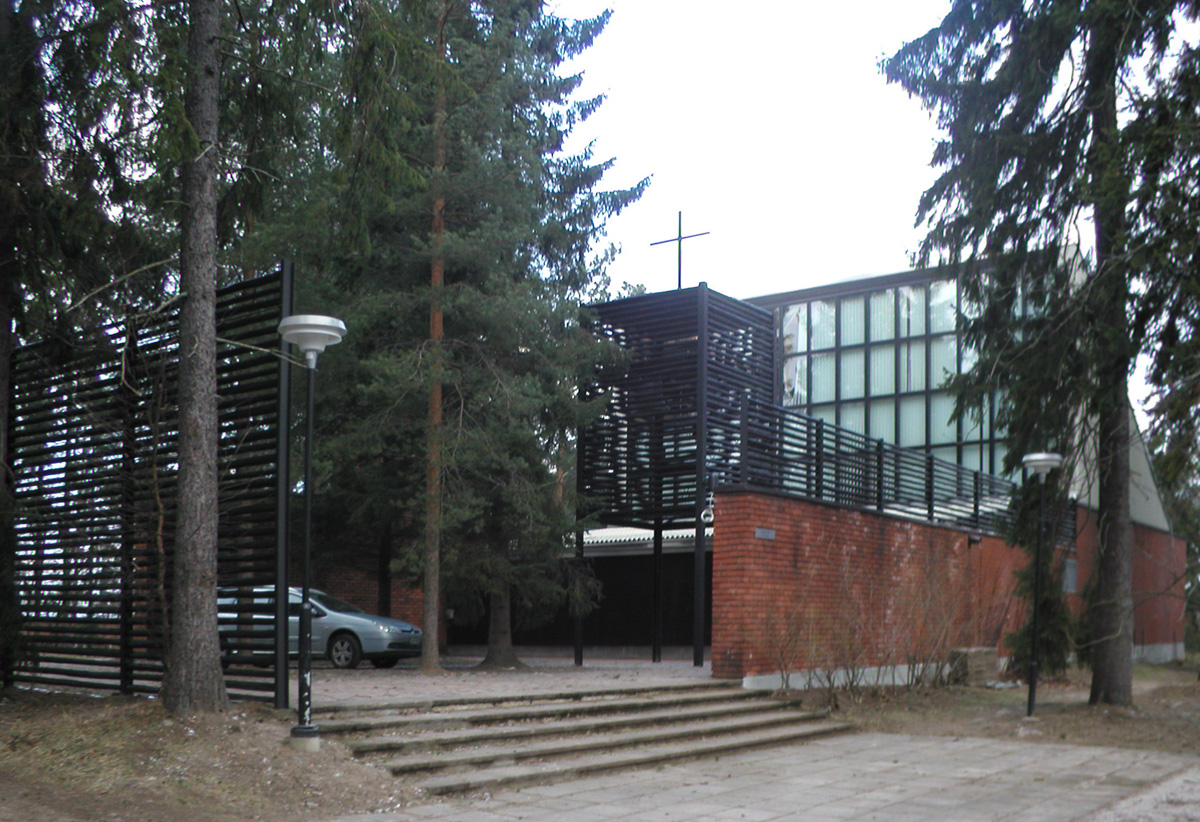
Otaniemi Chapel in 2008. The walled courtyard with the bell tower in front.

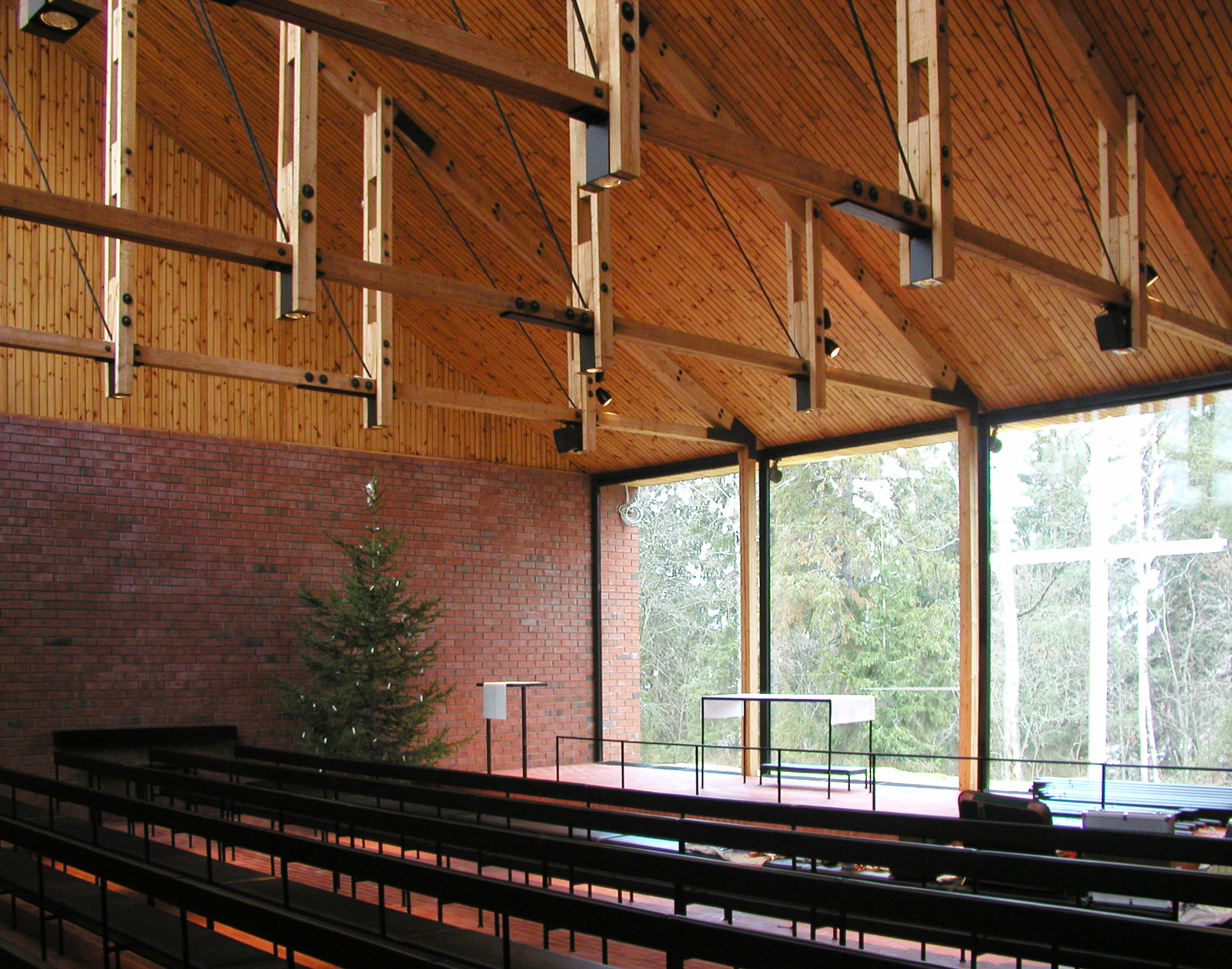
Chapel interior with the glass altar wall and the cross standing outside.

Otaniemi Chapel (Finnish: Otaniemen kappeli, Swedish: Otnäs kapell) is a Lutheran chapel located in the Otaniemi campus of Aalto University in Espoo, Finland.

== History ==
The chapel was designed by the architect couple Heikki and Kaija Siren for a 1954 architectural competition, completed in 1956 and inaugurated in 1957. Located in the Student Village of the Otaniemi campus, the chapel was originally built by the student union of the Helsinki University of Technology. The students wanted something to remind them of "the wholeness of life and the values of human life" in the middle of their technical studies. The student union sold the chapel to Espoo parish in 1972.

On 22 July 1976 the chapel burned down due to arson. It was built again to its original form in 1978.

The chapel has been gradually renovated in recent years: the technical systems of the building in 2008, the organ in 2009 and the sacristy in 2011.

== Architecture ==
The chapel is located on a small hill in the woods, surrounded by pine and birch trees. The main materials of the chapel are red brick and wood, tying the chapel together with other brick buildings in the campus area, including the main university buildings designed by Alvar Aalto.

The entrance of the building is through a walled courtyard that also has a bell tower. The chapel itself, past a clubroom, has two side walls made of bricks. The parallel walls "channel a progression from a secular to a spiritual view of nature": the altar wall is made of glass, opening to the surrounding nature with a white cross standing among the trees. The presence of nature is almost pantheistic.

== Functions ==
The chapel currently belongs to Tapiola parish and hosts baptismal ceremonies, weddings and funerals. It is also the gathering place for many associations, such as Christian student organizations and Bible study groups. The chapel has 150 seats and a 10-stop organ by Kangasala organ factory.

== Awards and recognition ==
In 2009 the chapel was awarded the International Carlo Scarpa Prize for Gardens. The jury called the building "masterly" simple and transparent, hailing the way nature, architecture and society come together at the site.

The National Board of Antiquities has listed the chapel as a nationally significant built cultural heritage site as part of the Otaniemi campus and Docomomo has selected the building as a significant example of modern architecture in Finland.

== See also ==
- Aalto University
- Dipoli
