= Glims Farmstead Museum =

Museum in Espoo, Finland

Coordinates: 60.2210°N 24.6798°E

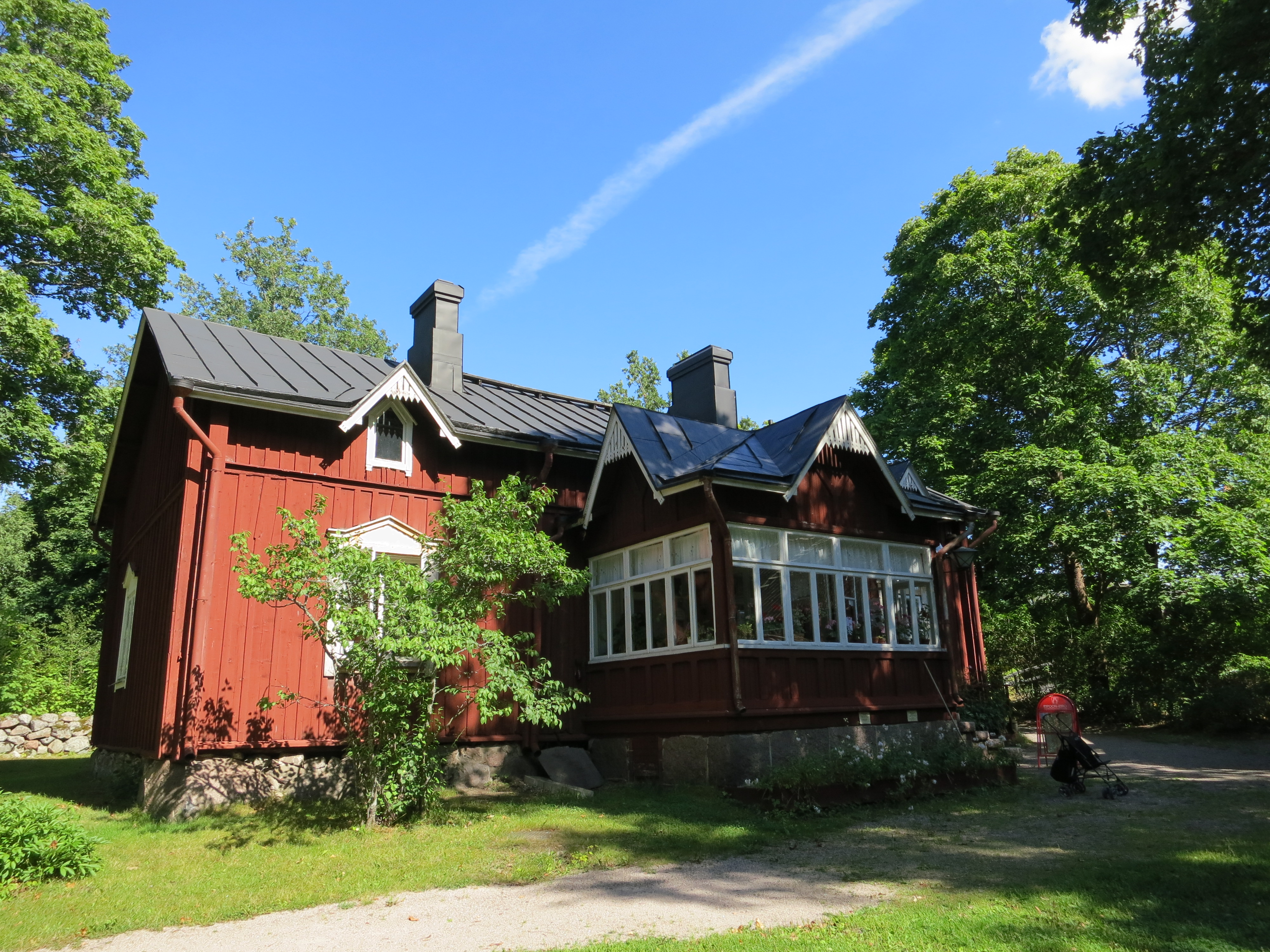
The main building of the Glims farmstead museum.

Glims Farmstead Museum is a museum located in Espoo, Finland and a branch of the Espoo City Museum. Glims tells about farming culture and rural life in the past centuries. The Glims farm was still a working farm in the beginning of the 20th century and it has been a museum since 1958. The museum area is located next to Jorvi Hospital.

== History ==
The Glims farm has a large yard accompanied by 11 original buildings. Most of the buildings are from the 19th century but the oldest ones were built in the 18th century. The Glims farm is part of the Karvasmäki village which has been inhabited since the Stone Age. The name Glims appeared in formal documents for the first time in the 16th century. The farm was owned by the Lönnberg family between 1800 and 1950. The farm was sold to the city of Espoo in 1950. After that, the farm buildings were used as rental lodgings.
