= Border and Coast Guard Academy =

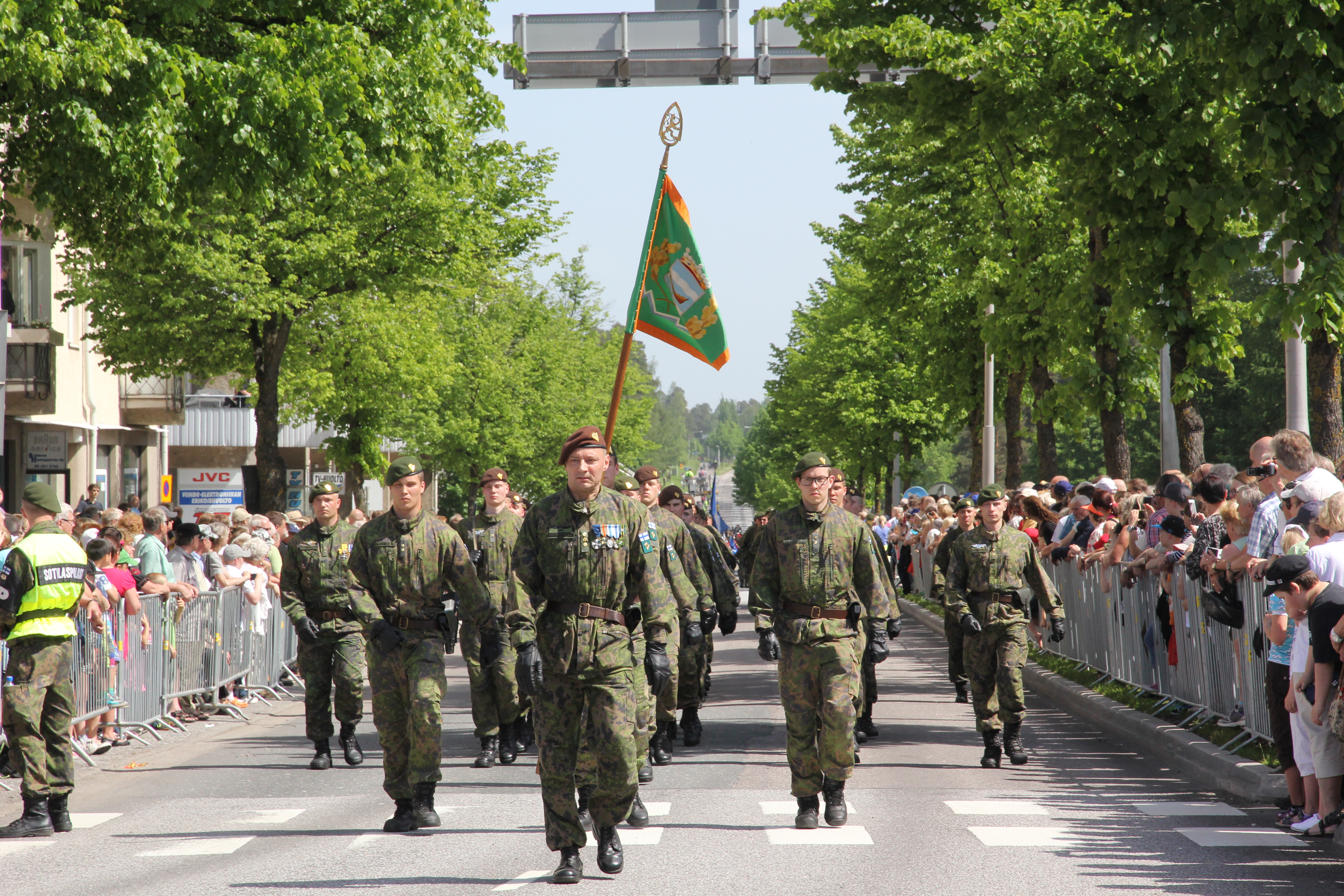
Border and Coast Guard Academy personnel on parade. Note the brown berets of the special border jaegers and the Cross of Freedom for peace-time combat merits worn by the senior lieutenant at the extreme left of the formation.

The Border and Coast Guard Academy (Finnish: Raja- ja merivartiokoulu, Swedish: Gräns- och sjöbevakningsskolan) is the educational institution responsible for training conscripts and all career personnel of the Finnish Border Guard. The activities of the Border and Coast Guard Academy are divided between two education centres located in Otaniemi, Espoo and Imatra.

The main training activities of the Border Guard academy are:

- Special border jaeger training for conscripts volunteering for special operations forces of the Border Guard.
- Basic course of the Border Guard for career personnel and their continuing education
- Professional officer education for the students of National Defence University

The special jaeger course accepts volunteer youths who apply to serve their conscription in special border jaeger training. The service term is 347 days and all special Border jaegers receive at least an NCO training.

The basic course of the Border Guard trains career personnel of the Border Guard for duties in border control, military defence and law enforcement. When operational needs require, special training courses are held for personnel destined for coast guard duties or for duties as aviation mechanics. Regardless of the specialization, the basic course lasts a year. All other ranks personnel of the Border Guard start their careers via the basic course. To be eligible for the course, the applicant needs to be a Finnish citizen who has passed conscription and is mentally and physically suitable for the work as border guard. Later, the career of the border guard may bring them again to the Academy for advanced and master border guard courses.

There are four main branches of border guard officer education: border guard, coast guard, border guard pilot and border guard aviation technology officer. The commissioned officers of the Border Guard take their bachelor's degrees in the National Defence University together with the career officers of the Finnish Defence Forces. The prospective officers of the Border Guard attend the Border and Coast Guard Academy during their second and third study years, while their Defence Force counterparts study in Army, Navy and Air Force Academies. The studies end in promotion to lieutenant. After five years in service as lieutenants, the commissioned officer may return to the National Defence University to study for master's degree. The service-specific part of the studies of border guard officers takes place in the Border and Coast Guard Academy also in the master's degree phase.

There is no possibility apply directly to border guard officer duties, but the prospective officers apply for National Defence University in general. The specialisation as a Border Guard officer is selected after the autumn of the second study year: those studying to become naval fleet officers may select to specialise in coast guard work, and the army cadets may select the border guard as their branch of service. To be eligible for education as a professional officer, the prospective student needs to be a Finnish citizen of less than 26 years of age and to have passed conscription with at least NCO training. Those who are not reserve officers need to pass reserve officer training before the start of their studies.

The Border and Coast Guard Academy is a Partnership Academy of Frontex, the European Union agency for external border security. The Academy participates in planning and organising border security training and research co-ordinated by Frontex. The special responsibility of the Academy is to train teachers and Schengen Border Evaluators.
