= Heikki Siren =

Finnish architect

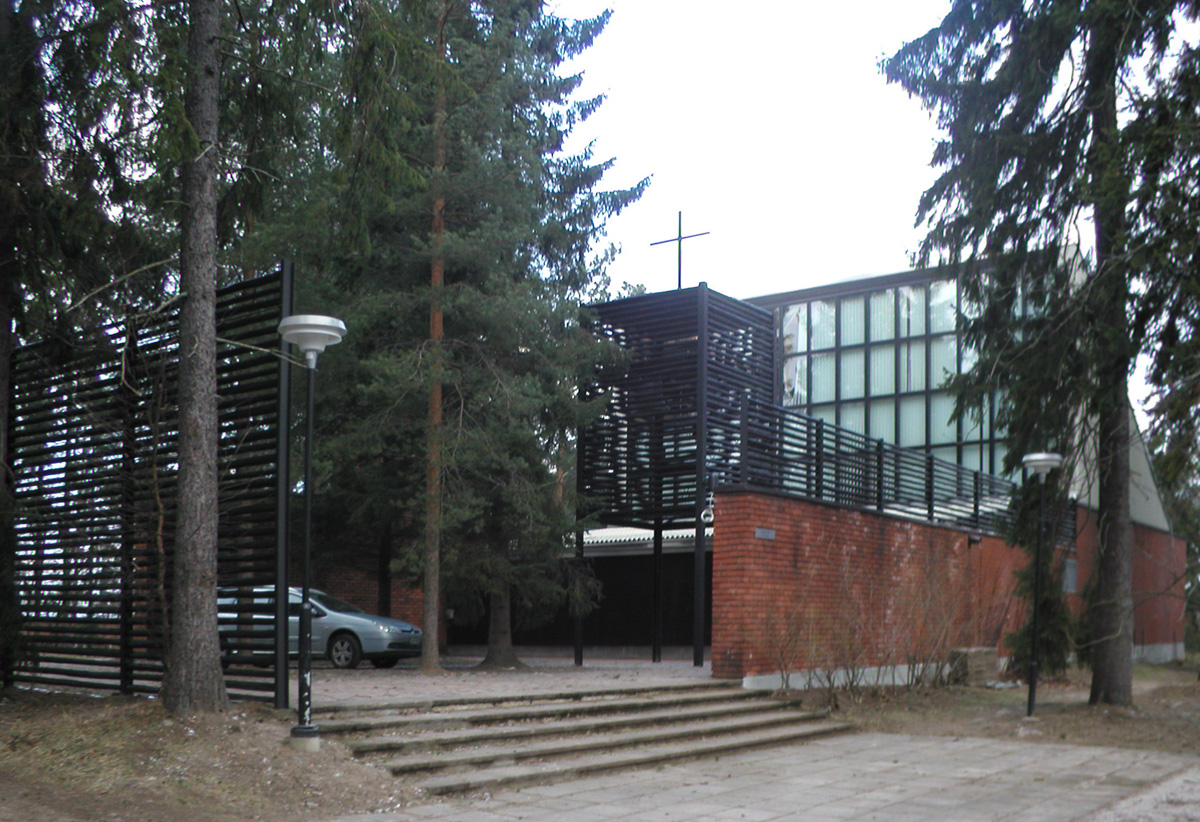
Otaniemi Chapel

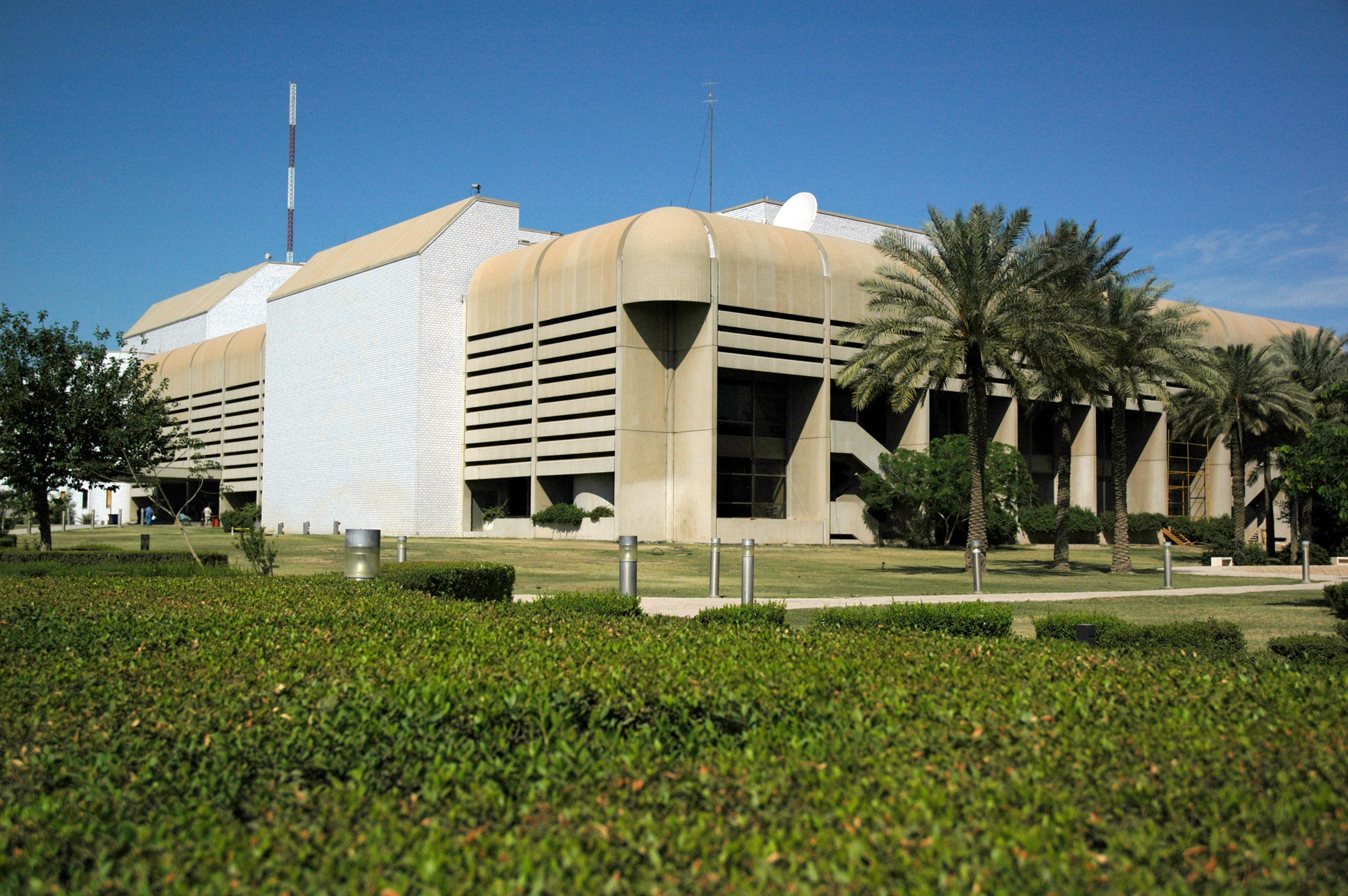
Baghdad Conference Palace

Heikki Siren (5 October 1918 in Helsinki – 25 February 2013 in Helsinki) was a Finnish architect. He graduated from the Helsinki University of Technology in 1946 as a student of his father J. S. Sirén. Heikki Siren designed most of his works together with his spouse Kaija Siren.

== Famous works ==
- Finnish National Theatre Small Stage, Helsinki, 1954
- Otaniemi Chapel, Espoo, 1956
- Kallio Municipal Offices, Helsinki, 1965
- Ympyrätalo, Helsinki, 1968
- Brucknerhaus, Linz, 1973
- Graniittitalo, Helsinki, 1982
- Baghdad Conference Palace, Baghdad, 1983
