= Foundation for Student Housing in the Helsinki Region =

Student housing provider

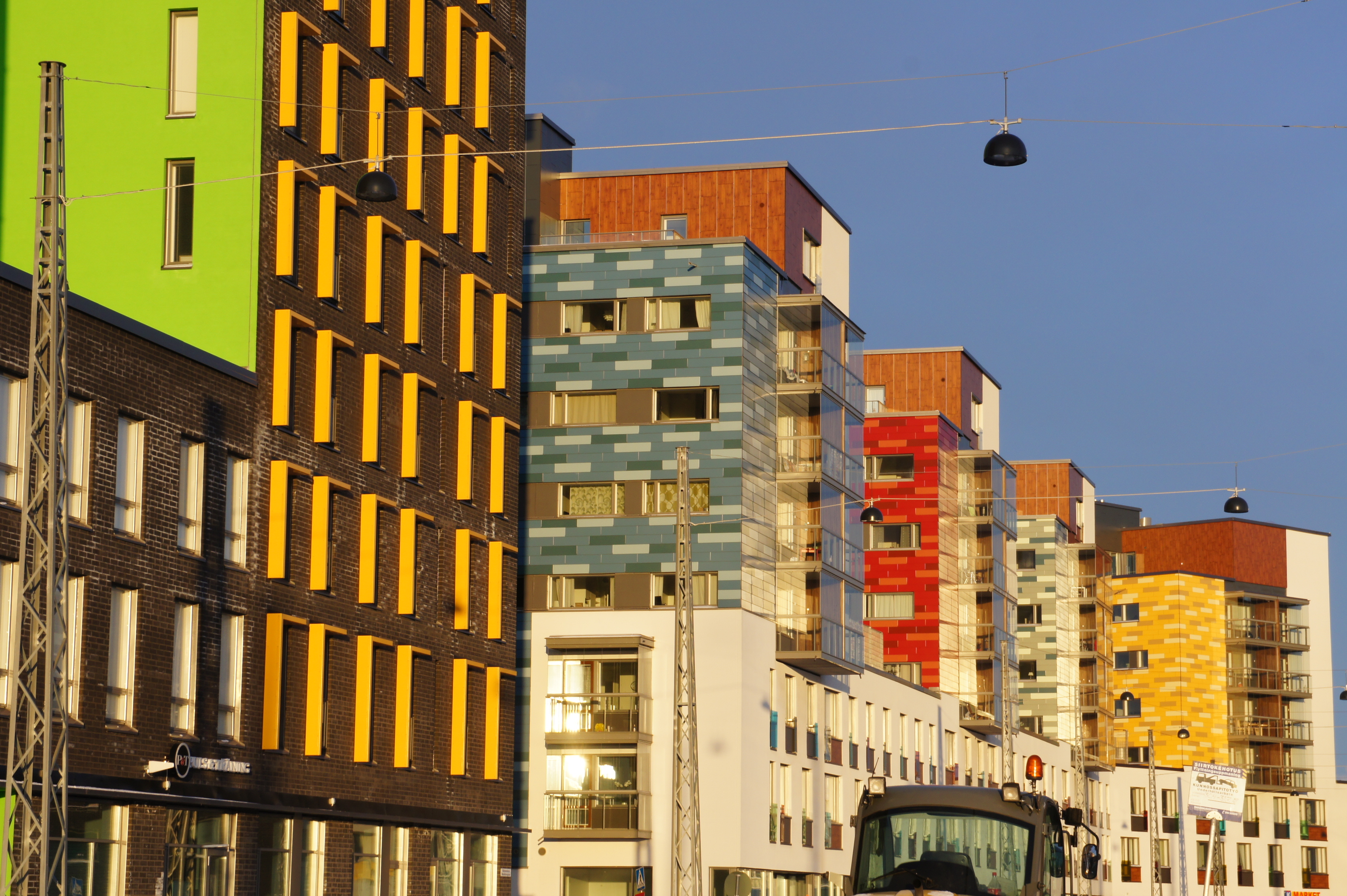
HOAS housing (right) in Jätkäsaari, Helsinki

Foundation for Student Housing in the Helsinki Region (HOAS, Finnish: Helsingin seudun opiskelija-asuntosäätiö, Swedish: Helsingforsregionens studentbostadsstiftelse) is a student housing provider operating in the Helsinki metropolitan area.
