= Kaija Siren =

Finnish architect

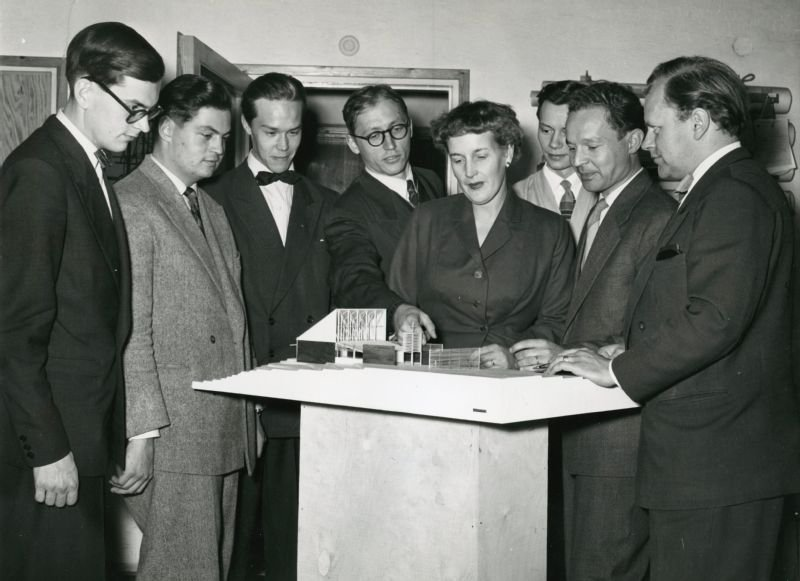
Kaija Siren with a model of Otaniemi Chapel in 1954.

Katri (Kaija) Anna-Maija Helena Siren (née Tuominen; October 23, 1920 – January 15, 2001) was a Finnish architect. She graduated as an architect from the Helsinki University of Technology in 1948. Siren designed most of her works together with her spouse, the prominent Finnish architect Heikki Siren.

Siren was born in Kotka. She and her husband Heikki Siren set up their own architectural office in 1949. The Sirens worked together as architects their entire lives. The Otaniemi Chapel is noted for its delicate balance between features of Finnish rural architecture and a modernism, influenced by Alvar Aalto's redbrick period of the 1950s. Their later work is noted for its monumentality.

She is buried in the Hietaniemi Cemetery in Helsinki.

== Major works ==
- 1954 Finnish National Theatre Small Stage, Helsinki, Finland
- 1956 Otaniemi Chapel, Espoo, Finland
- 1961 Orivesi Church, Orivesi, Finland
- 1965 Kallio Municipal Offices, Helsinki, Finland
- 1968 Ympyrätalo, Helsinki, Finland
- 1970 Lauttasaari School, Helsinki, Finland
- 1973 Brucknerhaus, Linz, Austria
- 1982 Graniittitalo, Helsinki, Finland
- 1983 The Conference Palace in Baghdad, Iraq

== Gallery of selected major works ==
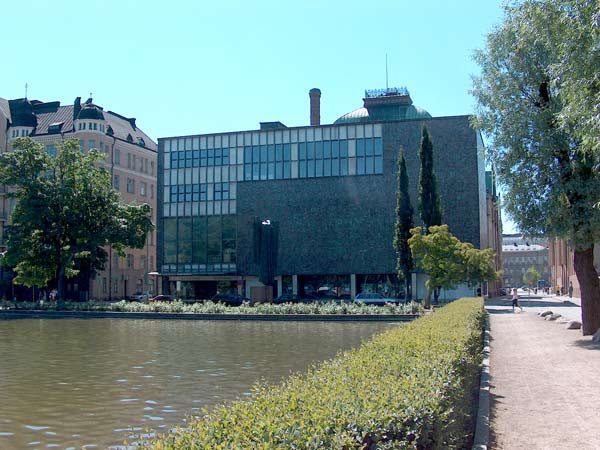
National Theatre extension, Helsinki (1954)

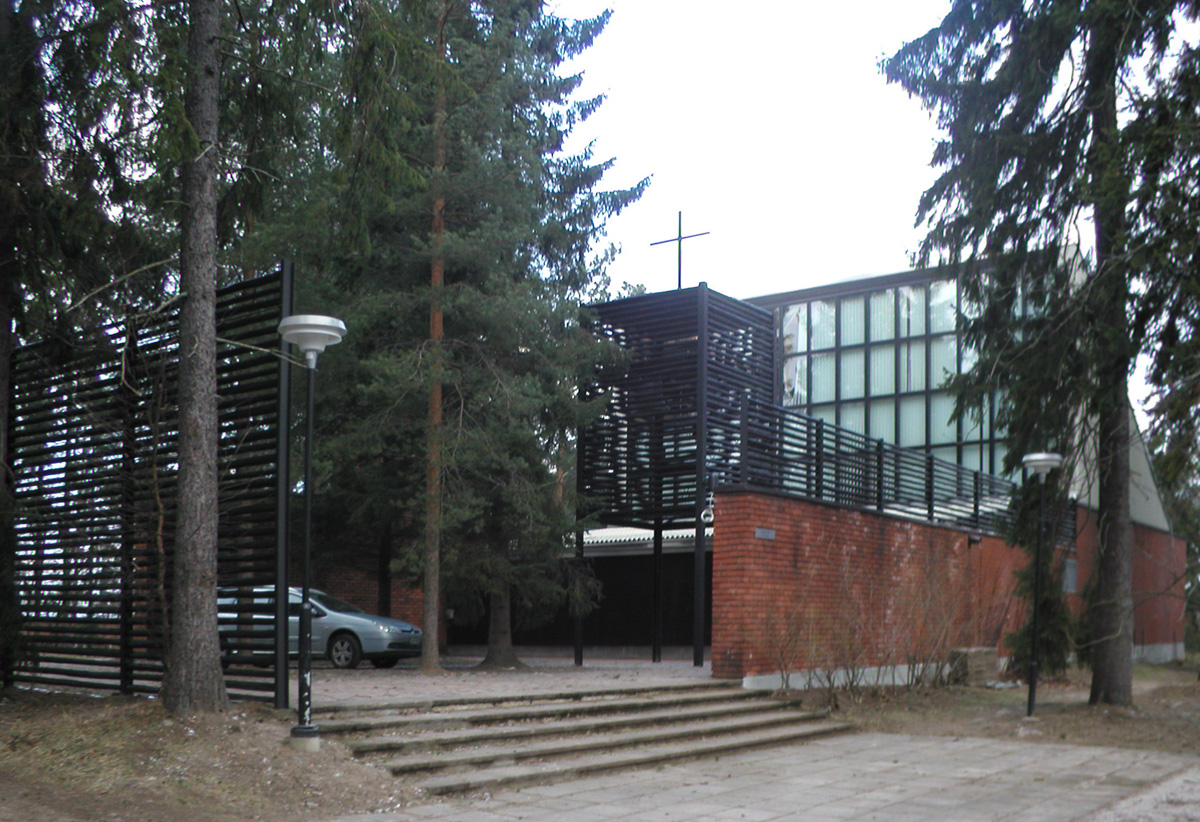
Otaniemi Chapel exterior, Espoo (1956)

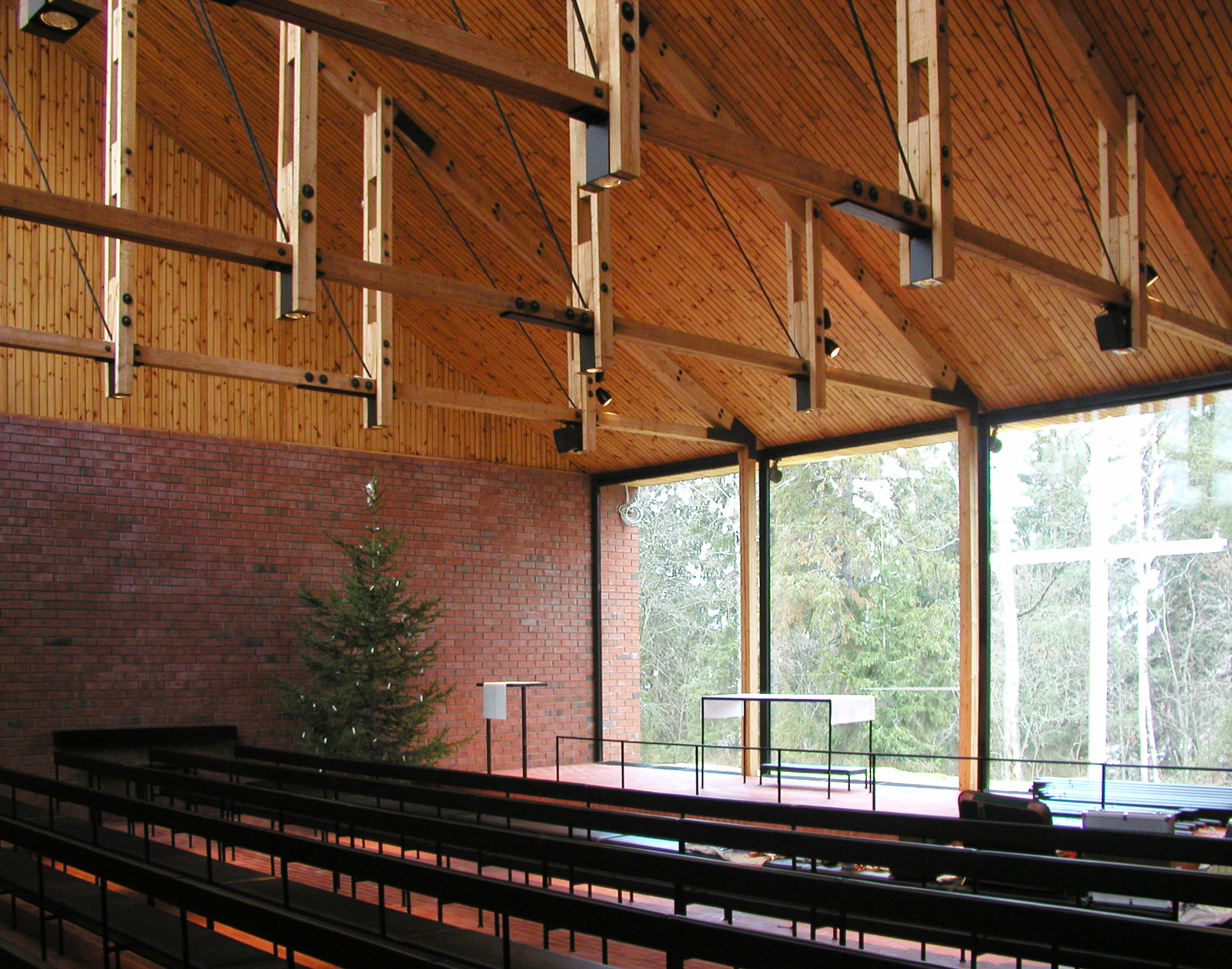
Otaniemi Chapel interior, Espoo (1954–57)

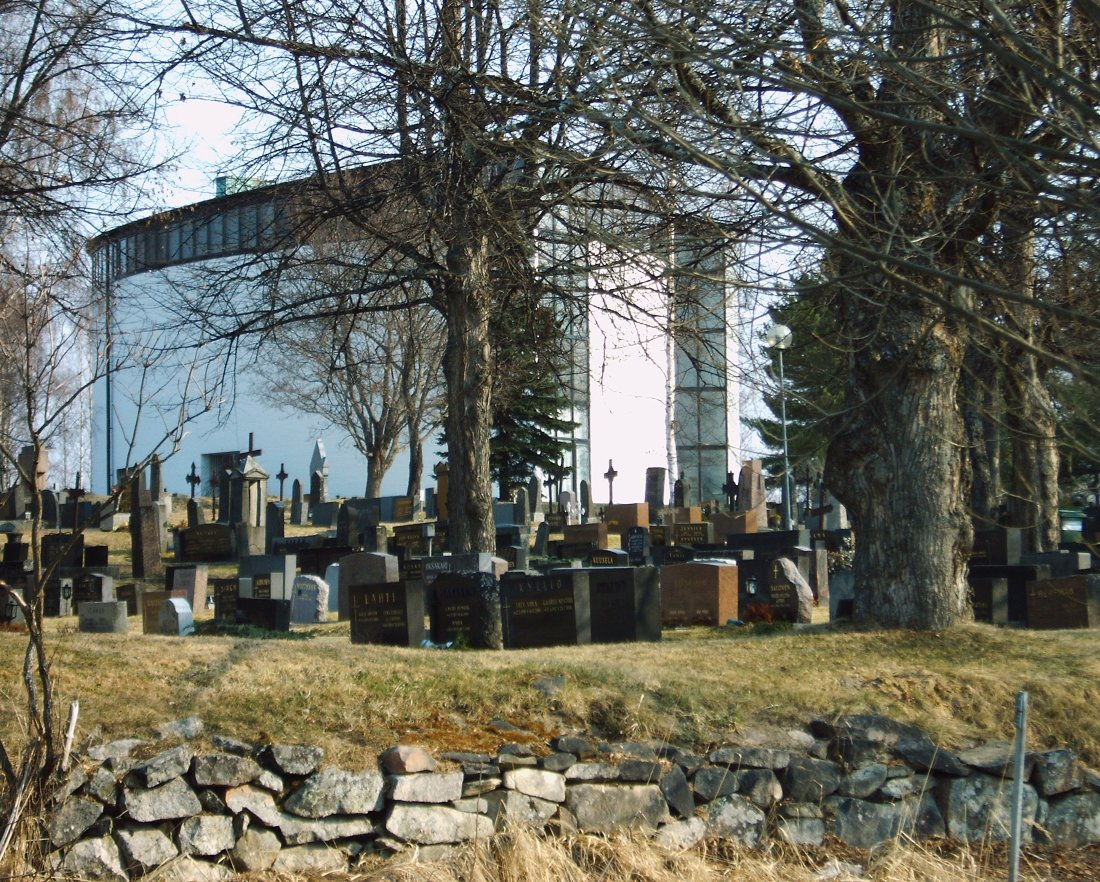
Orivesi Church, Orivesi (1961)

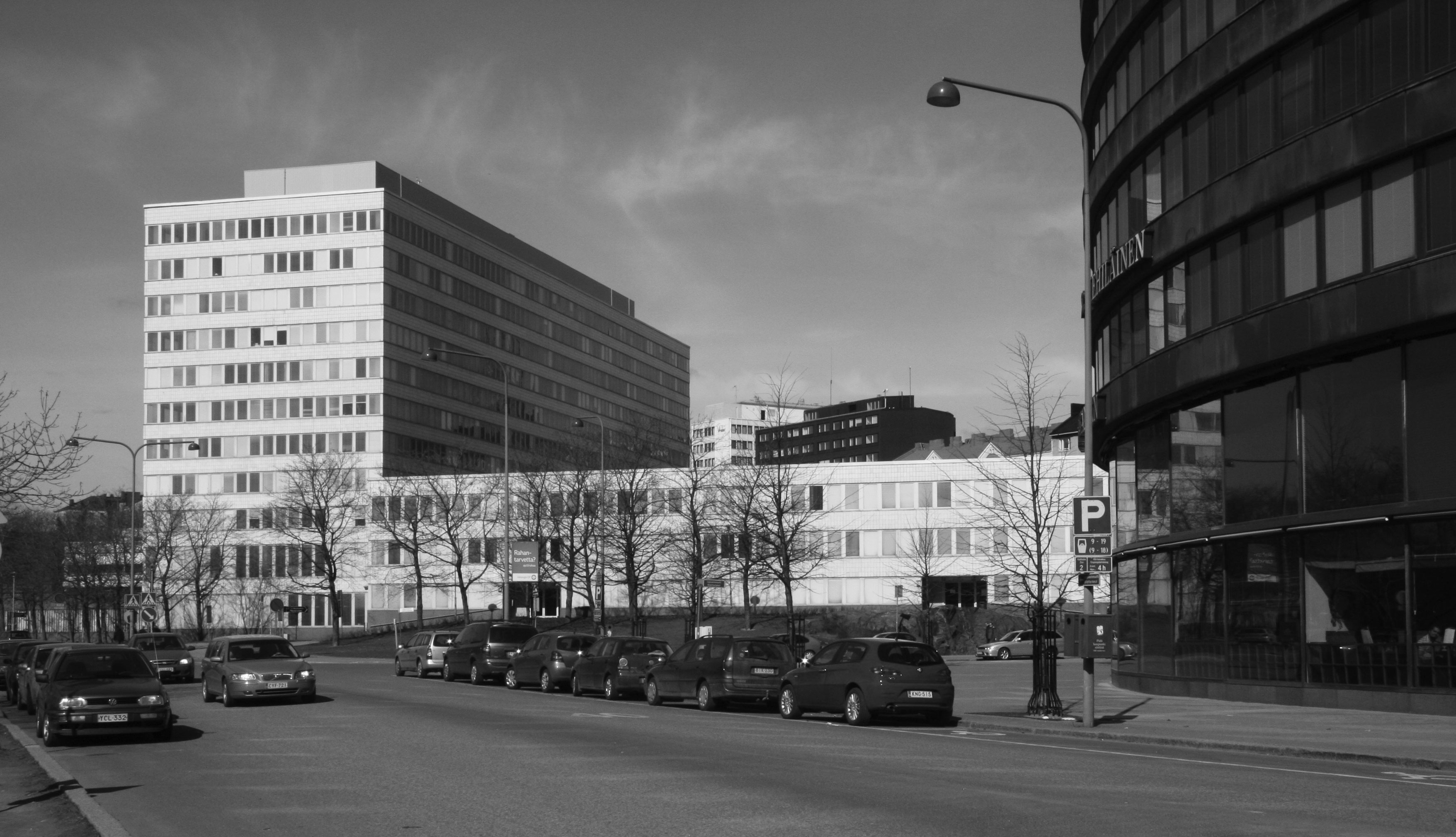
Kallio Municipal Offices, Helsinki (1965)

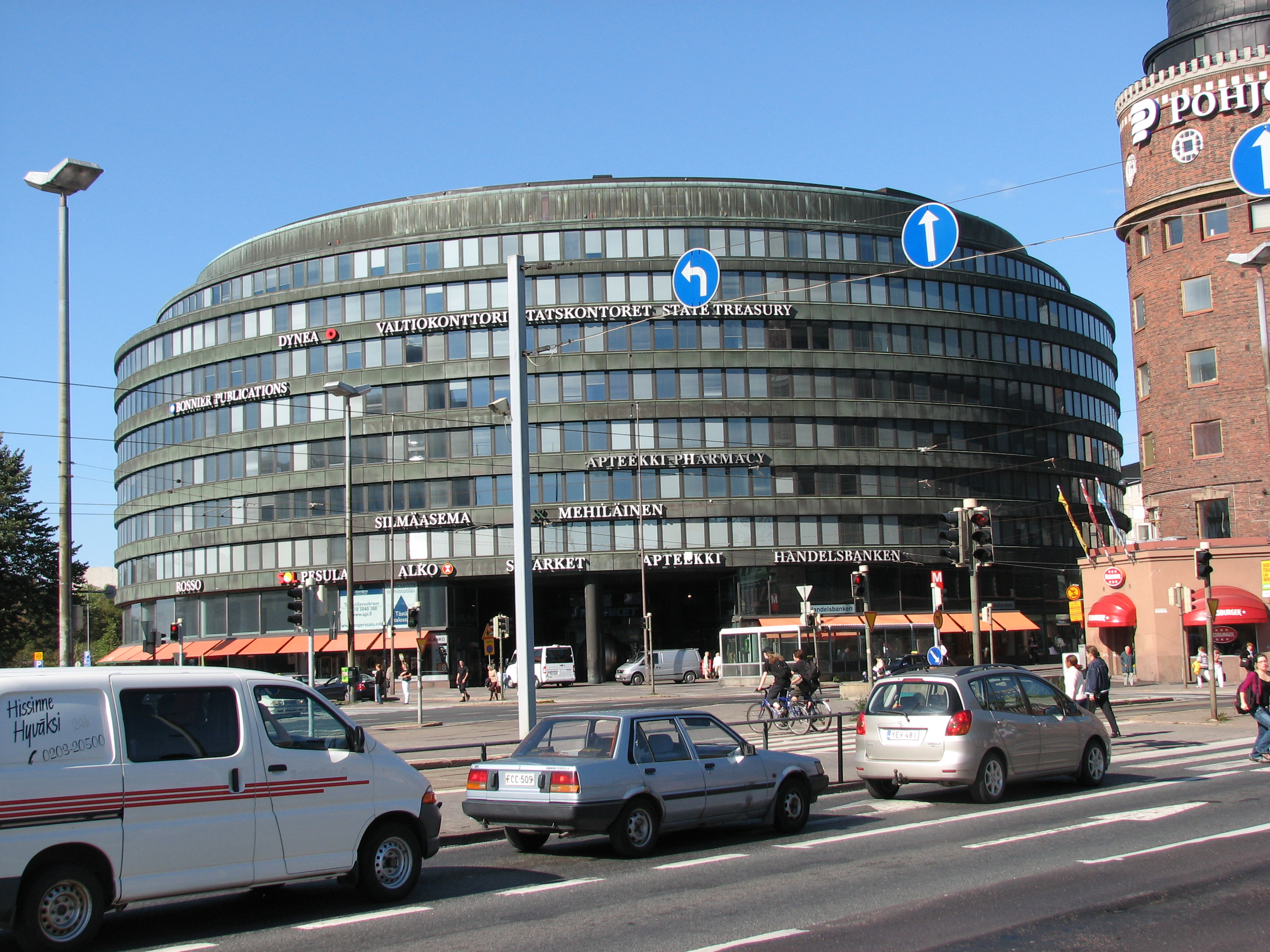
Ympyrätalo, Helsinki (1968)

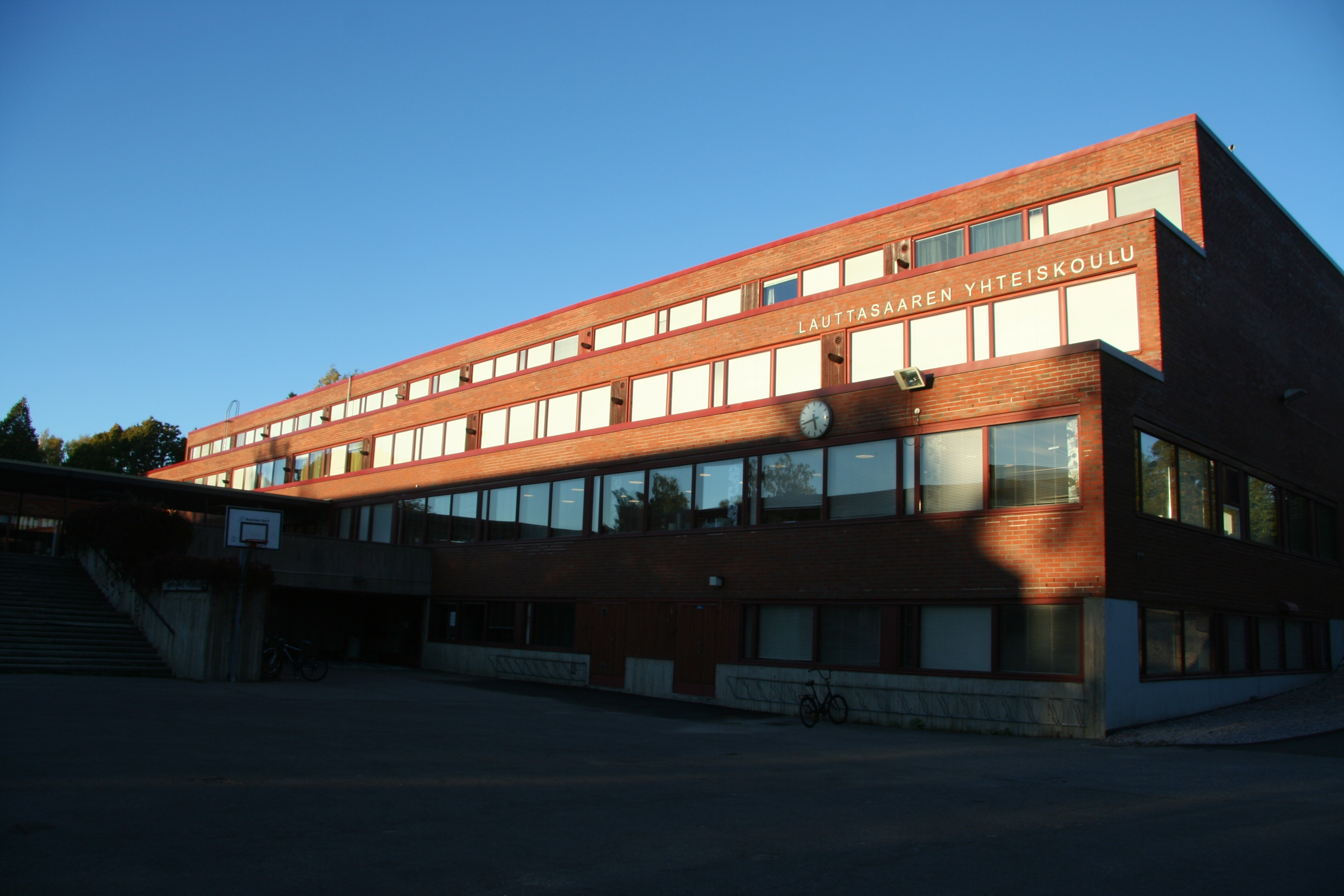
Lauttasaari School, Helsinki (1970)

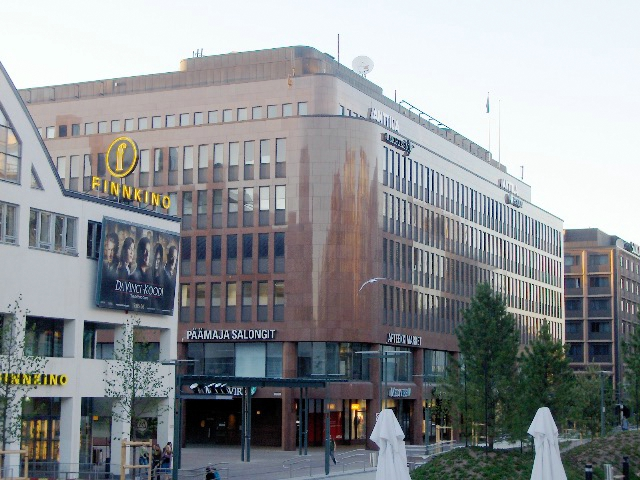
Graniittitalo, Helsinki (1982)

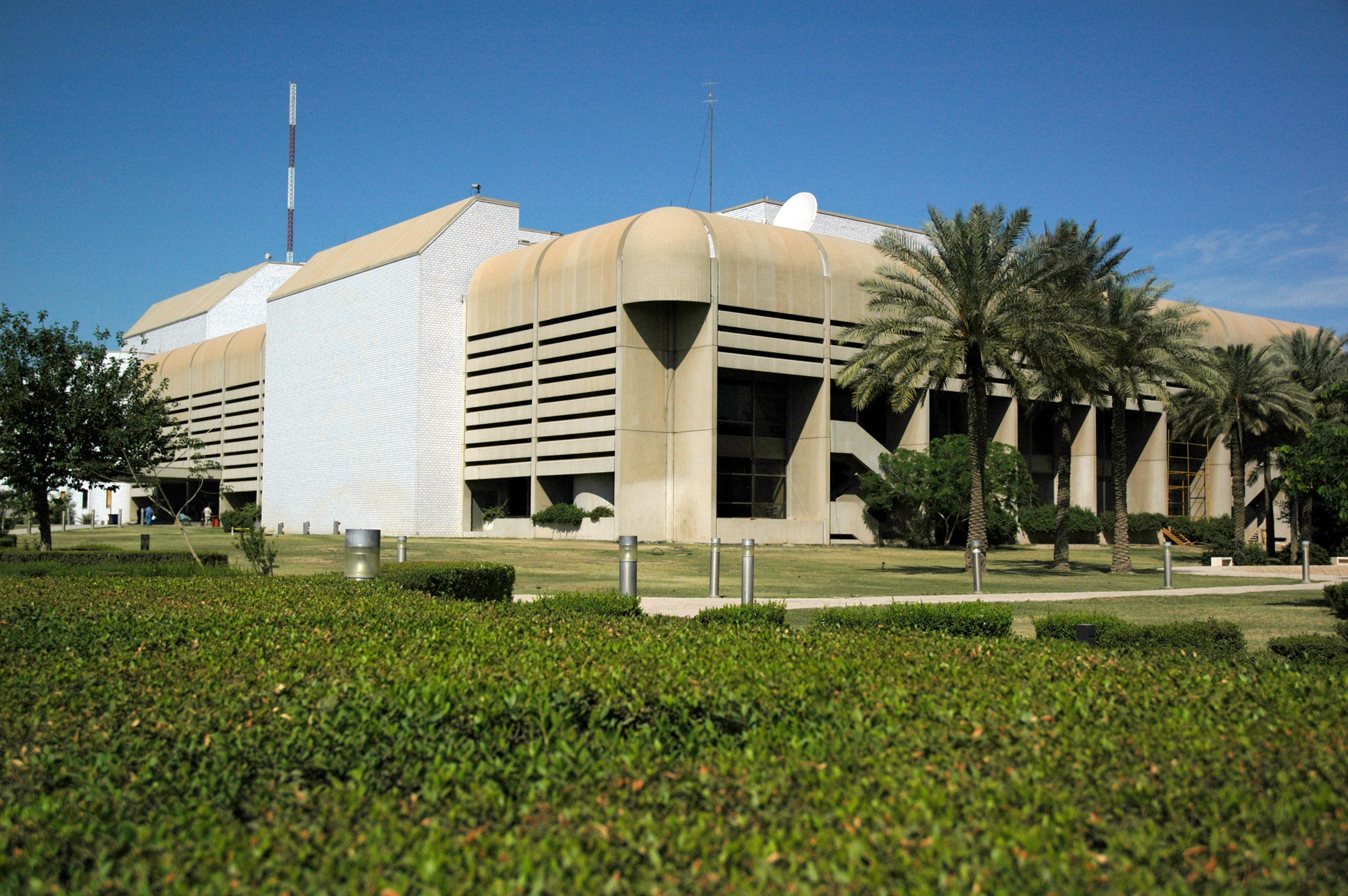
Conference Palace, Baghdad (1983)
