= Länsiväyläjuoksu =

Running event in Espoo, Finland

Coordinates: 60°11′8.23″N 24°50′5.27″E

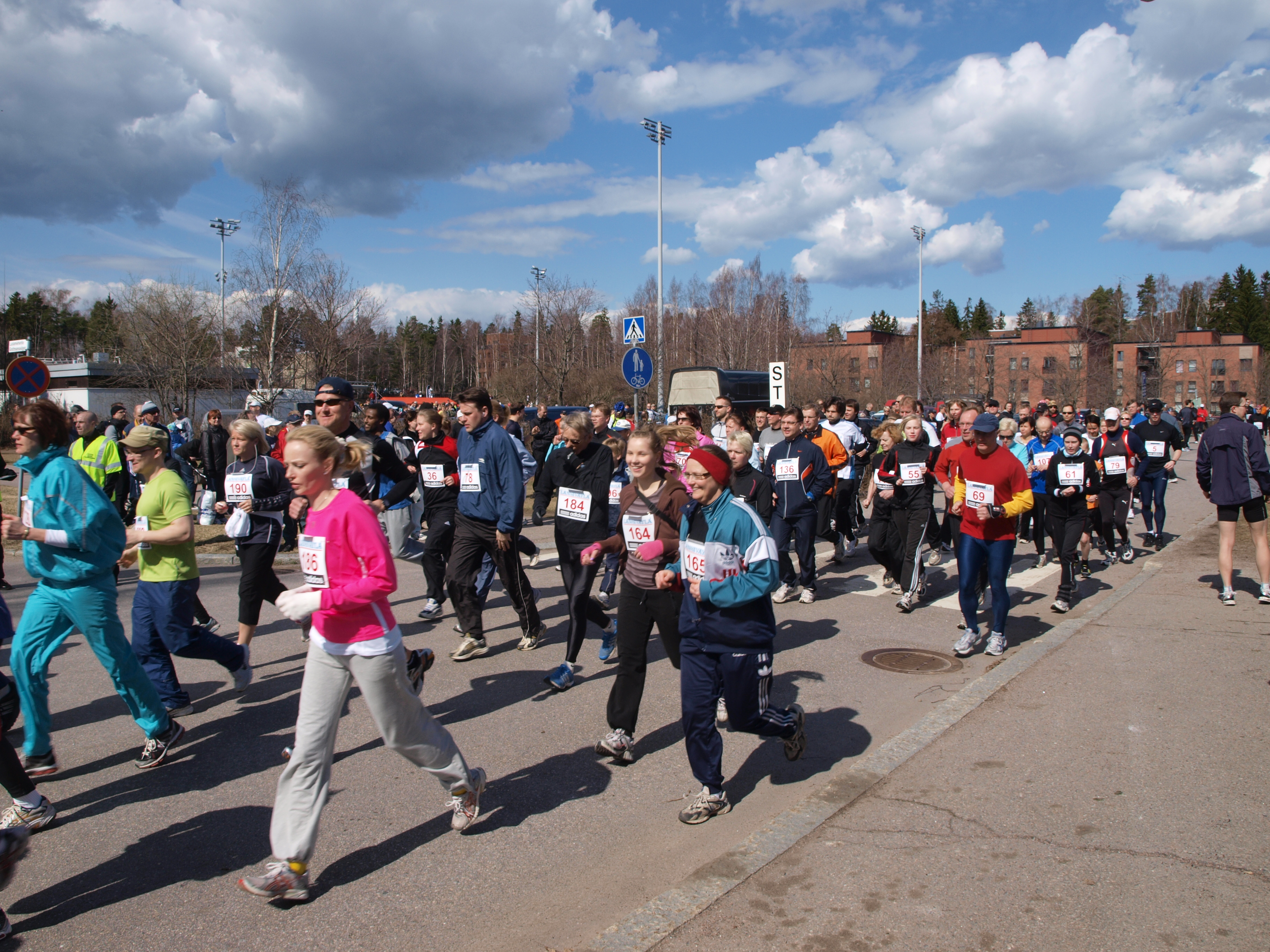
Participants of Länsiväyläjuoksu XXXIV in April 2010.

Länsiväyläjuoksu is an annual running event held in Espoo, Finland since 1976. Länsiväyläjuoksu is organised in conjunction by several private sporting clubs, and is open for everyone, both men and women, both adults and children, for a small participation fee.

There are three different options available in Länsiväyläjuoksu:

- Long-distance run (the main Länsiväyläjuoksu event): 17.4 km
- Short-distance run: 6.5 km
- Walk: 6.2 km

All options start and finish in Otaniemi, Espoo. From there all routes go to Tapiola, after which the short-distance run and walking routes turn back to Otaniemi. The long-distance run route goes from Tapiola to Mankkaa, then to Leppävaara and Laajalahti, crosses the municipality border to Munkkiniemi, Helsinki, then to Kuusisaari and Lehtisaari, crosses the municipality border back to Keilaniemi, Espoo and finally back to Otaniemi.

Participants in the running events are given individual participant numbers and RFID tags which provide real-time recordings of their running times. Participants of the walking event do not get any individual participant identification. All participants who successfully finish any event are given a commemorative medal as a reward.
