= Finago Tower =

High-rise office building in Keilaniemi, Espoo, Finland

Coordinates: 60.17491°N 24.83081°E

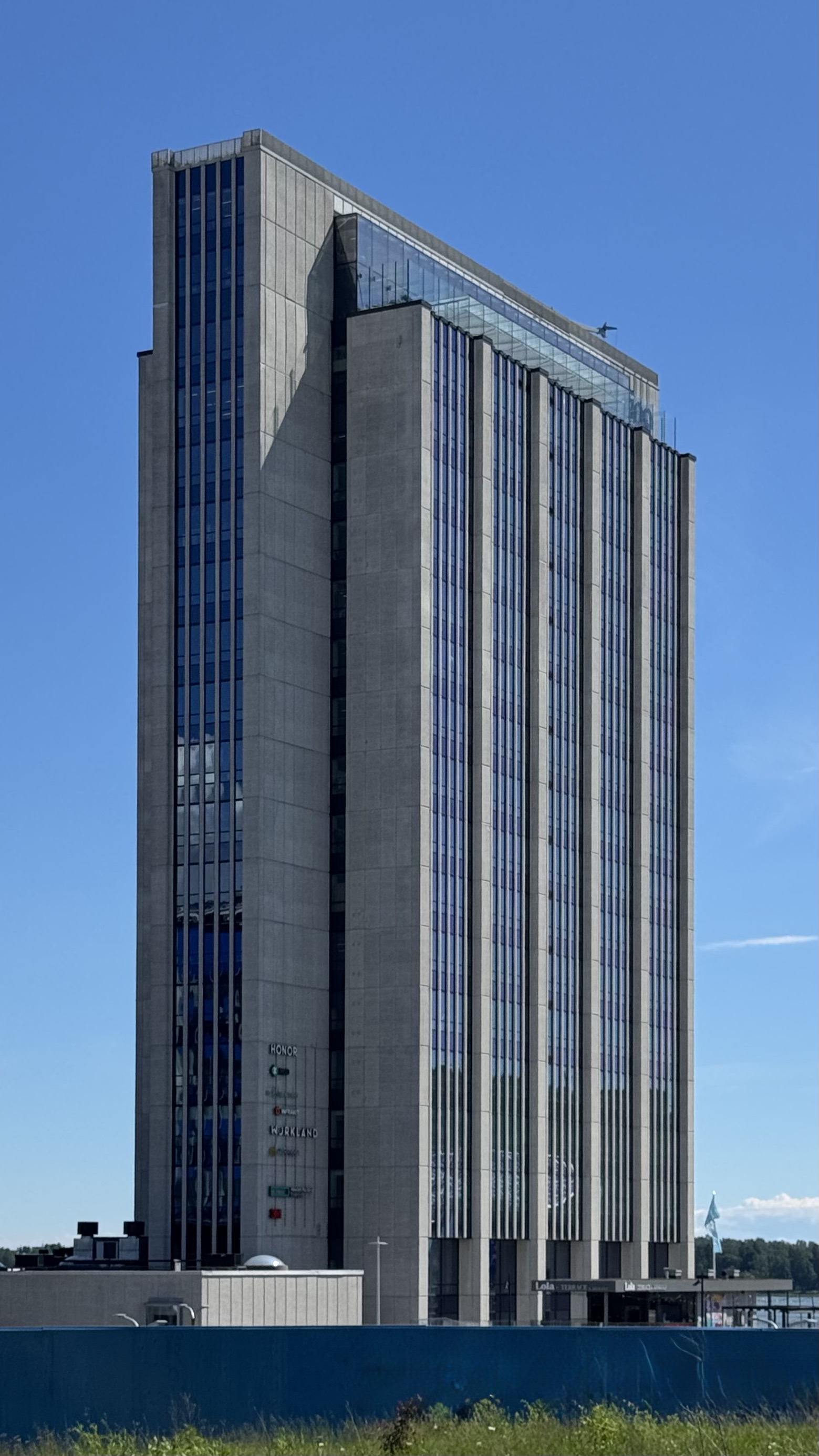
The building as Finago Tower, 2026.

Finago Tower (formerly known as Accountor Tower) is a high-rise office building, designed by architects Castrén–Jauhiainen–Nuuttila, located in the Keilaniemi district of Espoo, just outside Helsinki, the capital of Finland. With a height of 84 metres (274 feet), it is currently the 11th tallest habitable building in Finland, and was the tallest building in Finland from its construction in 1976 until 2006, when the Cirrus residential building in Vuosaari, Helsinki surpassed its height. It was also the tallest office building in Finland until 2025 when it was surpassed by the Horisontti building in Kalasatama, Helsinki.

Formerly known as the Fortum Head Office and before that Neste Tower, as of May 2018 it is the headquarters of the Nordic financial software company Accountor. Since November 2025, the building has been called Finago Tower.

When Imatran Voima merged with Neste, the merged company Fortum took the building as its headquarters. However, in the demerger six years later, the building was not returned to Neste Oil, but was retained by Fortum, the electricity producer. Consequently, Neste Oil had to construct a new office building nearby.

In 2017 the building was sold to Regenero Oy. Fortum's head office moved in the start of 2018 into a multi-space office located near the old office at Keilalahdentie 2-4. In addition to Fortum, the new head office building houses Tieto Oyj and Microsoft Oy. Regenero Oy leased the building to Accountor in early 2018. And since 2025, the primary tenant has been Accountor Software, later called Finago.

== Overview ==
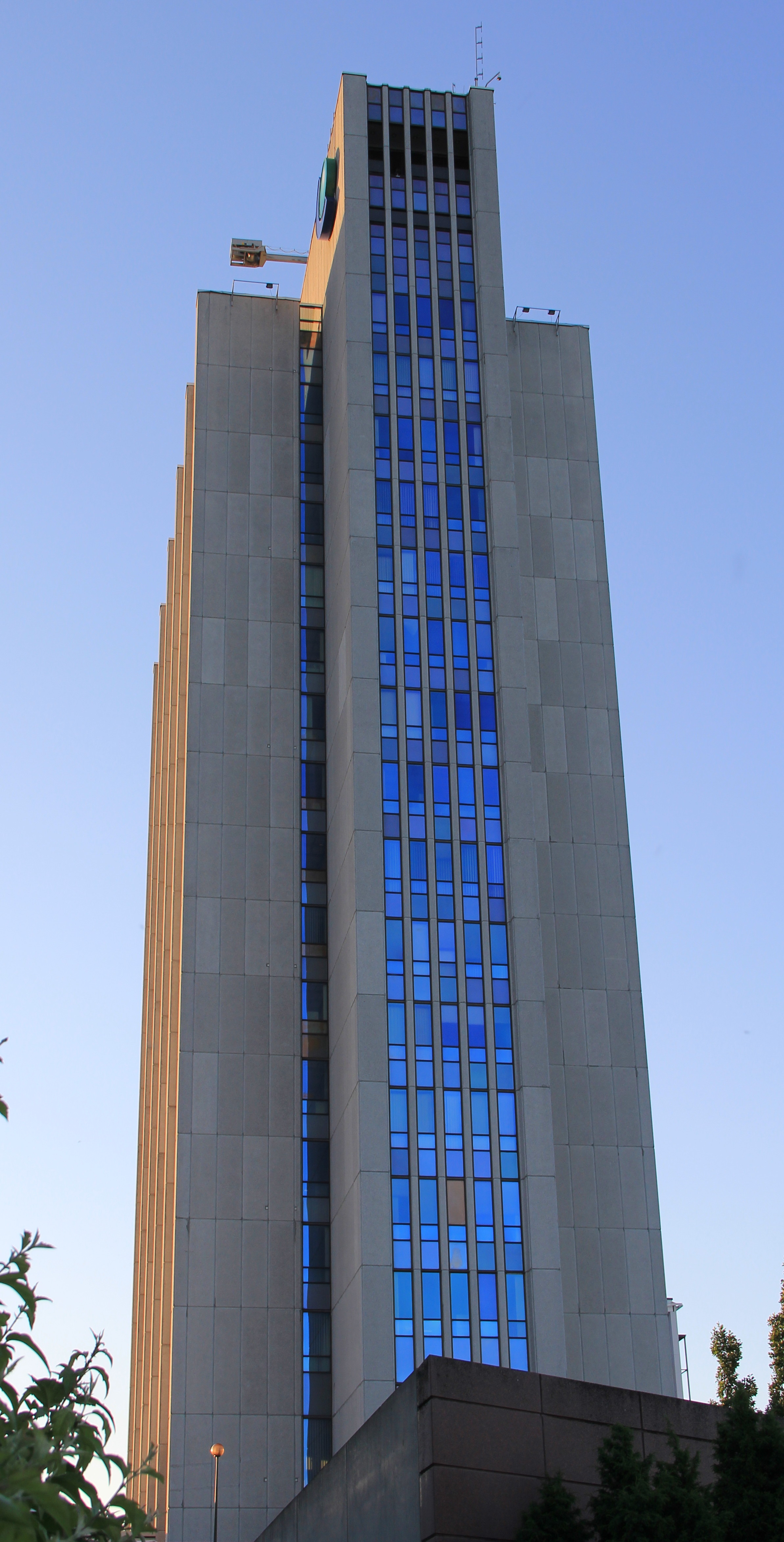
Vertical stripes of windows and pillars extending outwards highlight the height of the building. A view from the south.

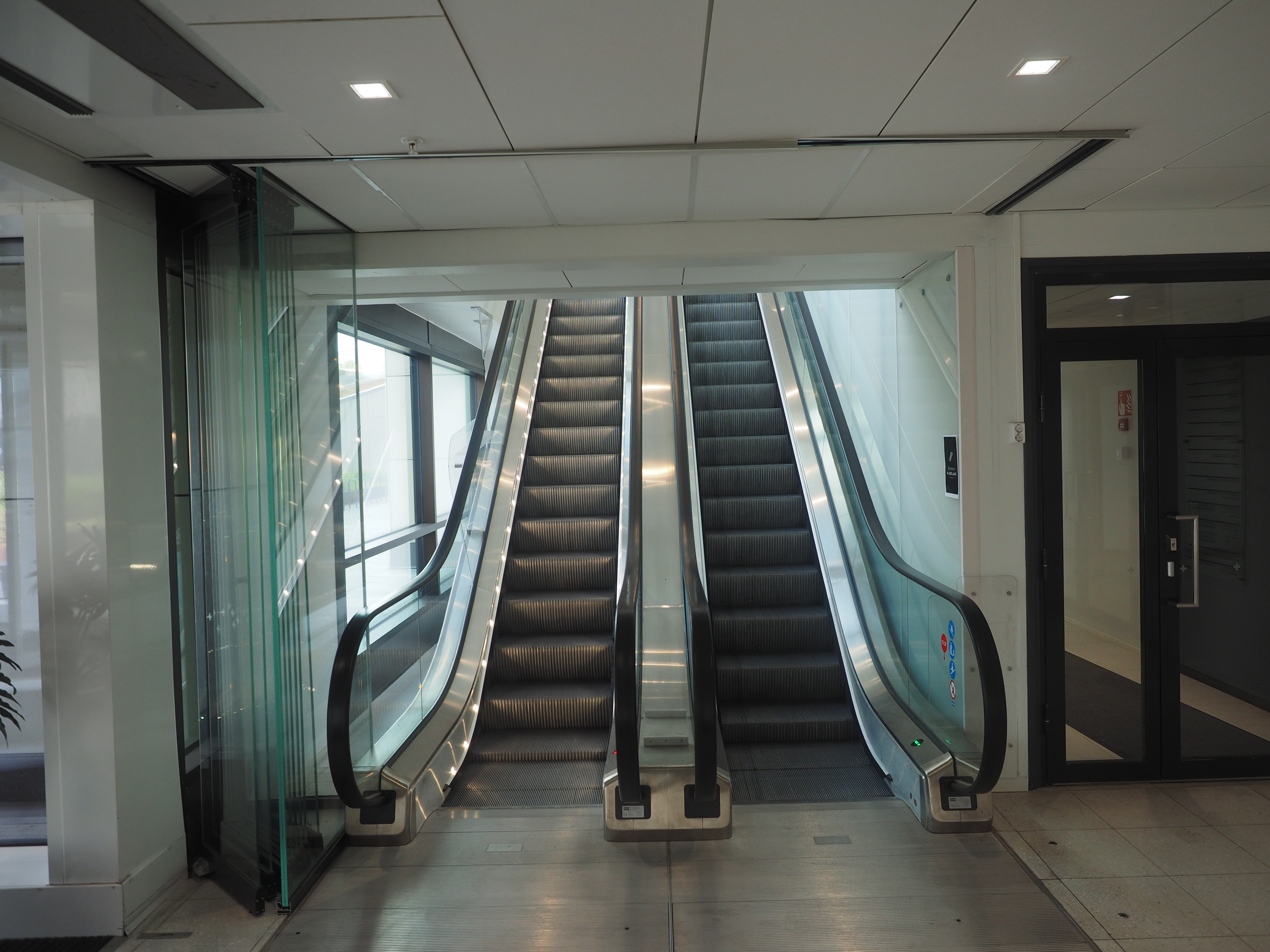
Escalators at the ground floor of the Finago Tower, leading to the second floor containing a lunch restaurant.

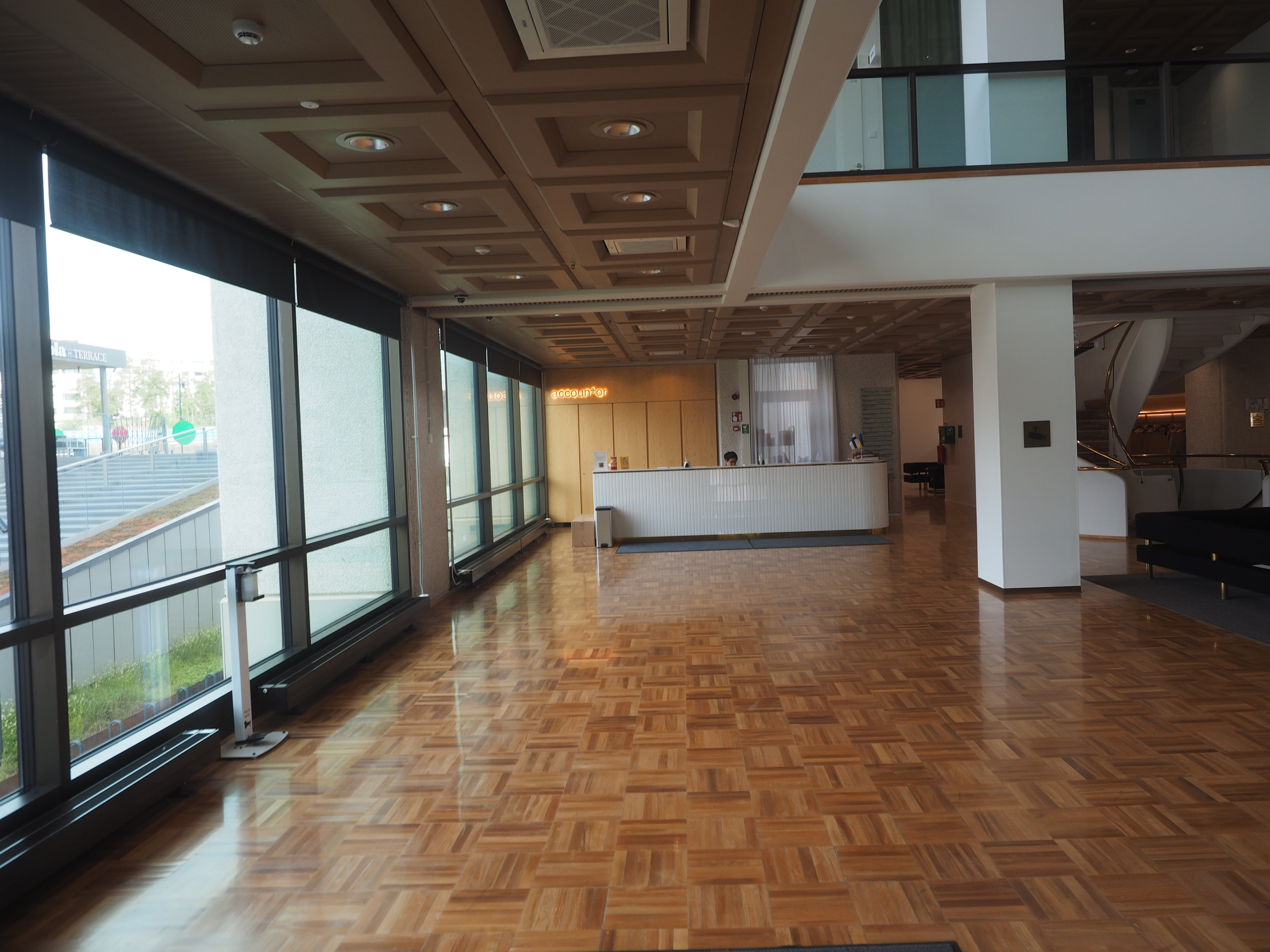
The reception desk of the Finago Tower is on the second floor.

The tower has twenty floors overground and two floors underground, and its height is 83.6 metres. The total floor surface area of the building is 25,444 square metres.

The facade of the tower is built of white limestone from Sipoo and the windows have a blue tint. The cross section of the tower is rectangular in shape, and both ends of the rectangle shape have parts extending outward from the main mass. Most of the office floors consist of open office spaces, with the tower having enough office space for over one thousand workers. The base of the tower includes a lunch restaurant and exercise spaces.

Next to the tower is a three-story high additional building called Keilalampi, built in 1994. It is built of steel and has a cone-shaped glass roof. The Keilalampi building was designed by the architect bureau CJN, the successor to the architect bureau Castrén-Jauhiainen-Nuuttila.

== History ==
=== Construction ===
Construction of the tower started in 1974 and it reached its full height in 1975. The building was completed in 1976 and taken into use on 7 October in the same year.

At the time of the building's construction, Uolevi Raade was the manager of Neste, which merged and later demerged with Imatran Voima, the predecessor of Fortum. As a result, the building is sometimes referred to as Raaden hammas (lit. "Raade's tooth"). Raade oversaw the construction of the building carefully, down to the details in the interior. He also wanted that the executive offices at the top floor should have a view both to the Naantali oil refinery in the west and to the Porvoo oil refinery in the east. However, it is not possible to see to Naantali from the building.

In 1994 Neste expanded its head office by building a lower expansion building called "Keilalampi" next to the tower, giving it the official name Valovirta.

=== Later use ===
After the fusion of Neste and Imatran Voima the building was transferred to the ownership of the new power company Fortum in 1998, and the company Neste Oil which separated from Fortum built a new head office near the original building.

On 30 April 2014 Fortum announced plans to renovate the tower into a residential building. The underground floors would have hosted businesses while the Keilalampi building would remain in office use. The company saw that hosting modern transformable office spaces in the building was not possible. The Fortum Retirement Foundation owned the tower as well as the Keilalampi building, while the four lots in the area were owned by Fortum.

In 2017, Fortum and the Fortum Retirement Foundation sold the building to Regenero Oy, a joint company by YIT and HGR Property Partners. From 2017 to 2018 the Fortum head office moved to the nearby former head office of Nokia, which also hosts the head office of Tieto and the Finland head office of Microsoft.

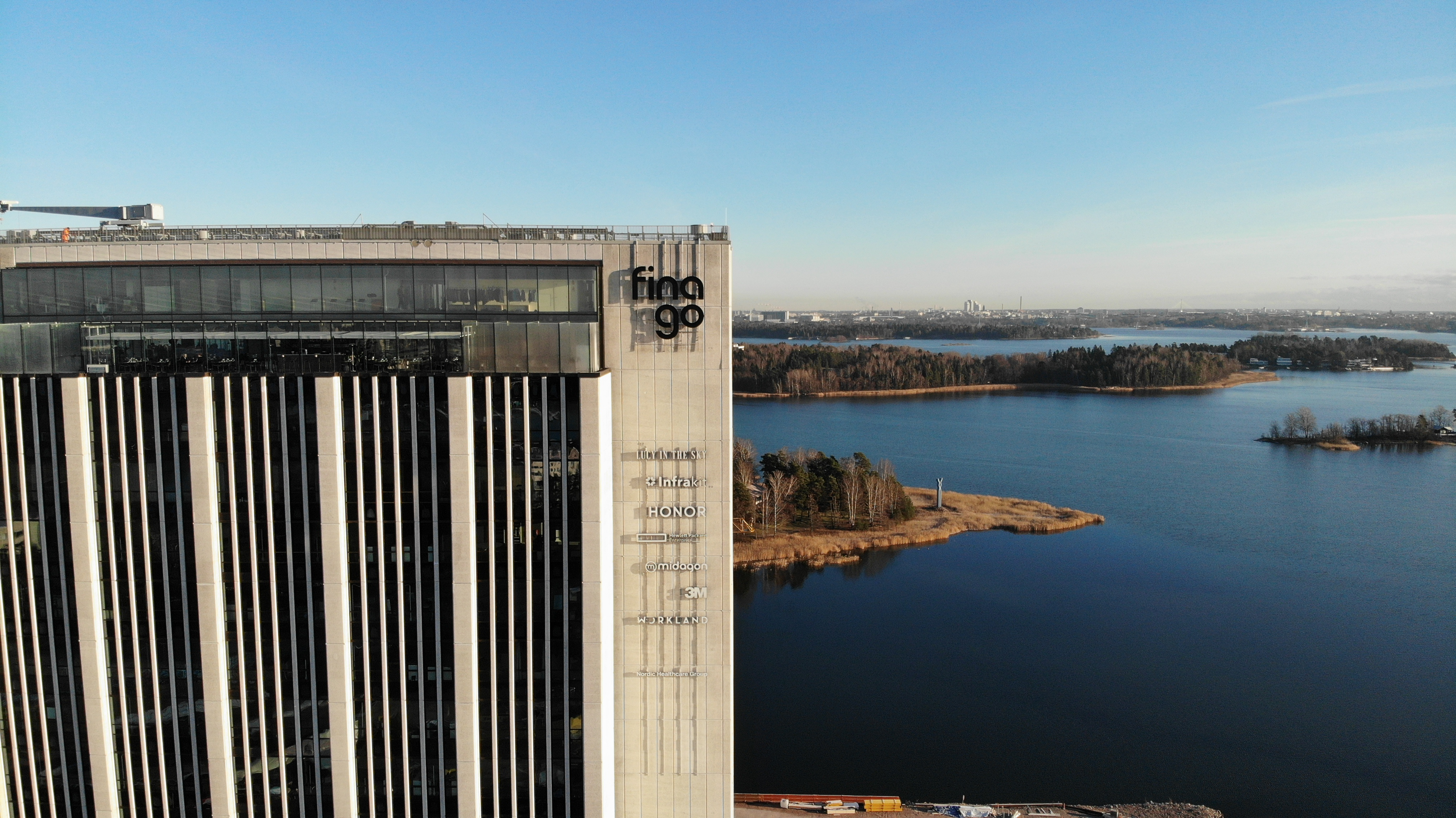
Image of Finago Tower in Keilaniemi, Espoo, Finland in 2025.

In 2018 the plan to convert the building into residential use was abandoned. The financial software company Accountor moved into the premises in late 2019. At the same time the building was renamed as the Accountor Tower.

In spring 2020 Hewlett Packard Enterprise moved its Finland head office to the Accountor Tower. Since November 2025, the building has been called Finago Tower.

== See also ==
- List of tallest buildings in Finland
