= Uolevi Raade =

Finnish businessman (1912–1998)

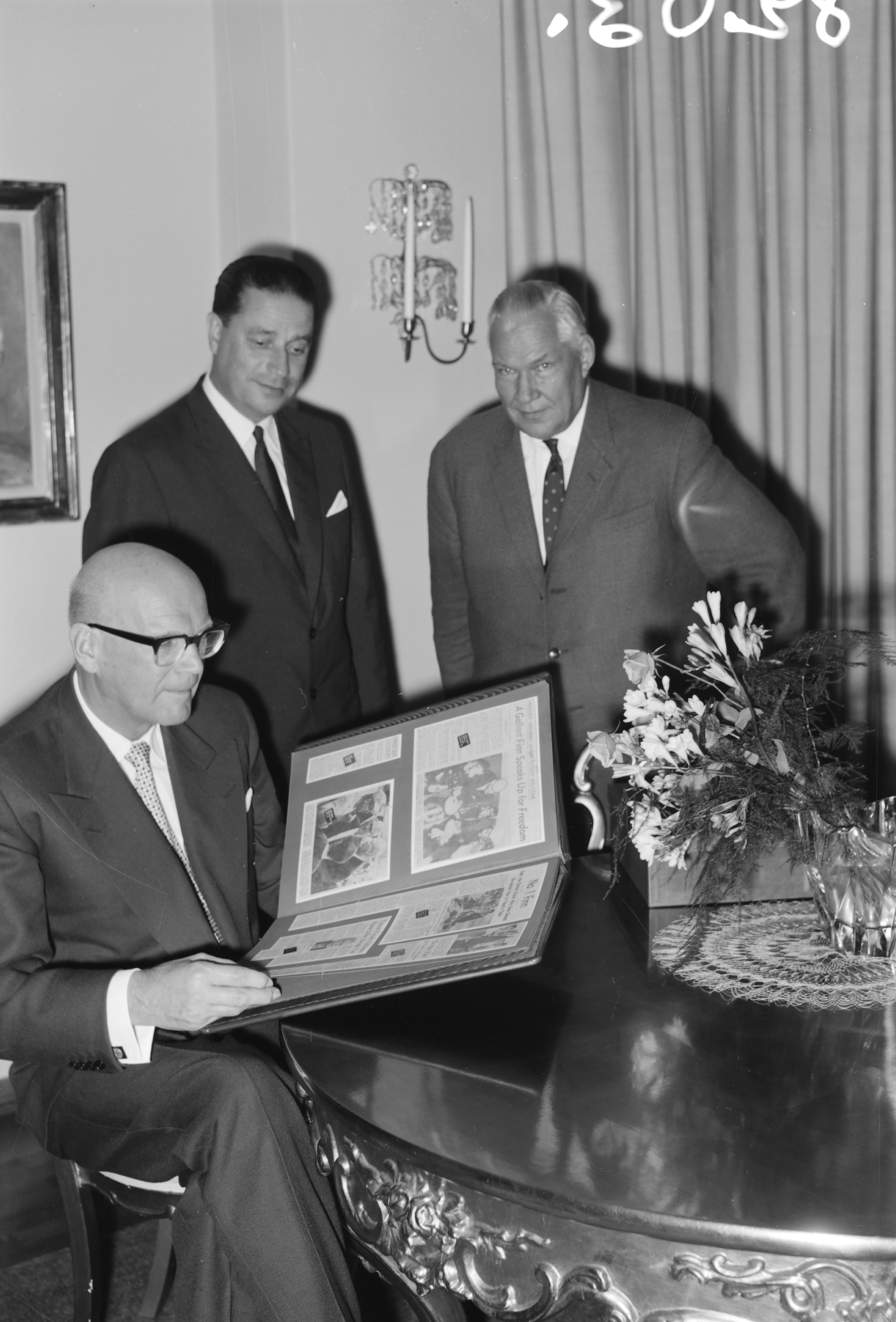
Uolevi Raade (standing to the left) with Urho Kekkonen (sitting) in 1961.

Tauno Uolevi Raade (5 July 1912 – 13 May 1998) was a Finnish industrialist and a long-time managing director of Neste (now Neste Oil), the Finnish national oil refining company.

== Biography ==
Uolevi Raade was born in 1912 in Turku to parents Kaarle Raade (previously Randell), a deputy president of the court and Agnes Wittfooth, an artist belonging to the old Wittfooth merchant family. He matriculated from the Turku Lyceum and received university degrees from Helsinki University of Technology (TKK) in 1935 and Åbo Akademi in 1942. At TKK, he was one of the founders of the student flying club. During the Second World War he initially served as a fighter pilot, but was soon transferred into the industry.

Raade's career started in industry from 1937 to 1942 (for example at Lokomo). In 1945, he was appointed the director of Ministry of Trade and Industry, where he planned the payment of war reparations stipulated by the Soviet Union. Raade is said to have made detailed plans and schedules for the war reparations, thanks to which Finland managed to pay its war reparations to the Soviet Union in full. Already in this role he was involved in the founding of the Finnish oil industry. In 1955, he was appointed managing director of Neste. The first oil refinery at Naantali was brought on stream a couple of years after this.

Raade and his friend, Prime Minister and from 1956 President of the Republic Urho Kekkonen were responsible for promoting the project; Kekkonen rallied the politicians and Raade took care of relations to industry at home and abroad. Kekkonen got the politicians to cooperate in the project, while Raade handled industry connections both home and abroad. Right from the start, Neste was a very international company. Its technology came from the United States, the raw oil came from the Soviet Union and the money to finance this came from various countries such as France. As well as his work at Neste, Raade served as a member or chairman of the board at various central industry unions and 37 different companies. In 1959, Raade also became the chairman of the board at Neste. He acted in both positions until his retirement in 1979. In addition to this post, he was also active in industrial federations and committees and was a member or chairman of the board of 37 corporations.

During the last years under Raade's leadership, Neste ordered the most efficient naval rescue ship in Finland from Germany. The ship was given to the Finnish Naval Rescue Society. There are various stories about Raade's involvement in ordering the ship. There was a suggestion to name the ship as Uolevi Raade, but it ended up being named Ossi Barck after the company's first and longest-serving captain.

The former headquarters building of Neste, now occupied by Accountor, is colloquially called Raaden hammas "Raade's tooth". It was constructed from 1973 to 1978 and was the tallest office building in Finland until 2025. Raade oversaw the construction of the new office building carefully, down to the minute details.

Raade received the honorary title of vuorineuvos (the highest one awarded to industrialists) in 1962. Under Raade's leadership, Neste became the largest company in Finland at the time. He was invited as an honorary member of the Finnish Academy of Technical Sciences in 1977. He was one of the first Finnish businesspeople to have acquired a great deal of fame abroad. In 1971 the New York Post published an article about a bathroom with golden faucets and dubbed Raade as "the oil sheik of the North". The Aleksis Kivi Society in Finland awarded Raade the "Eskon puumerkki" prize in 1981.

Raade died in Helsinki in 1998 and is buried at the Naantali cemetery.
