= Lehtisaari shopping centre =

Shopping mall in Helsinki, Finland

Coordinates: 60°10′50.34″N 24°50′59.85″E

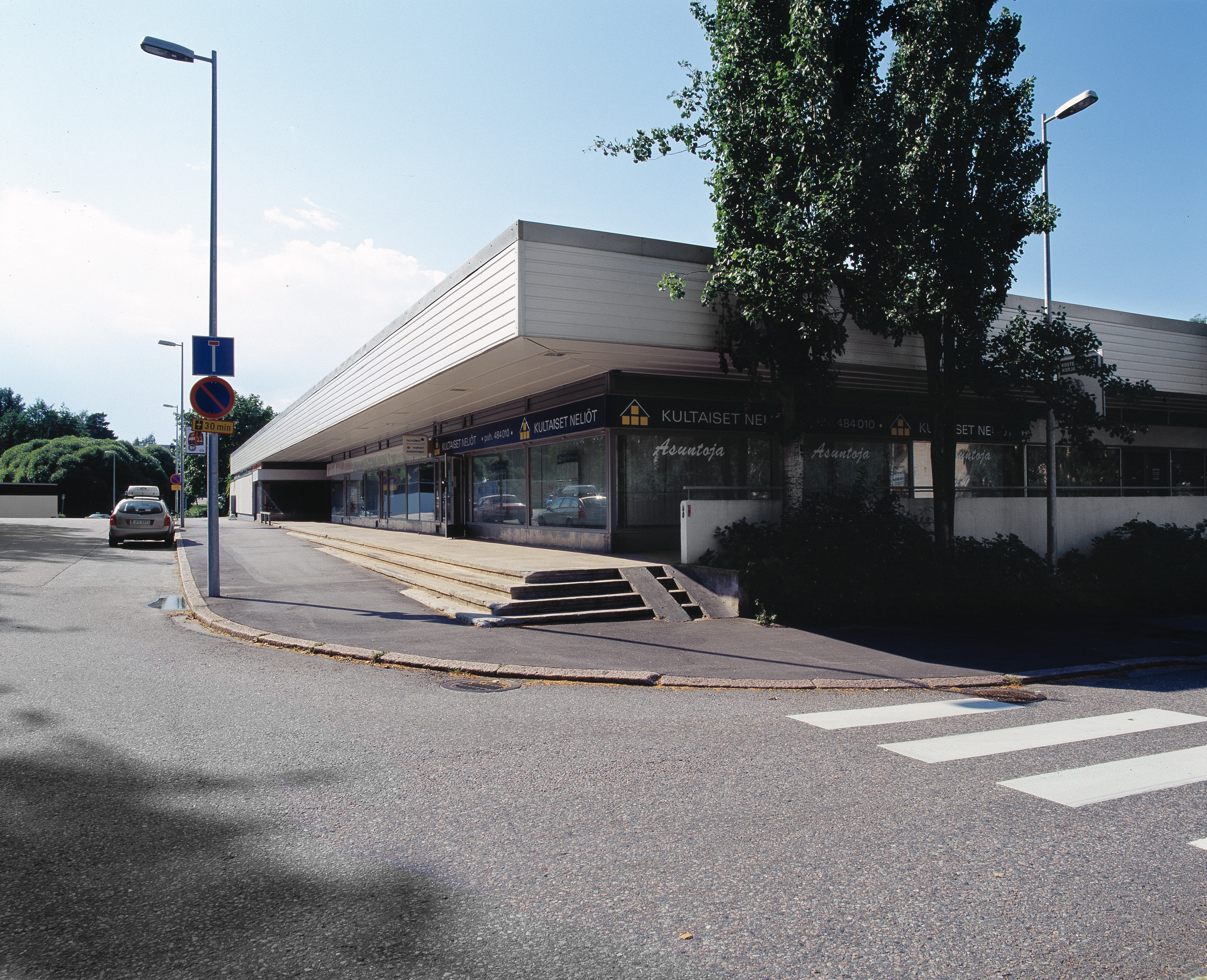
The shopping centre seen from Lehtisaarentie in 2004

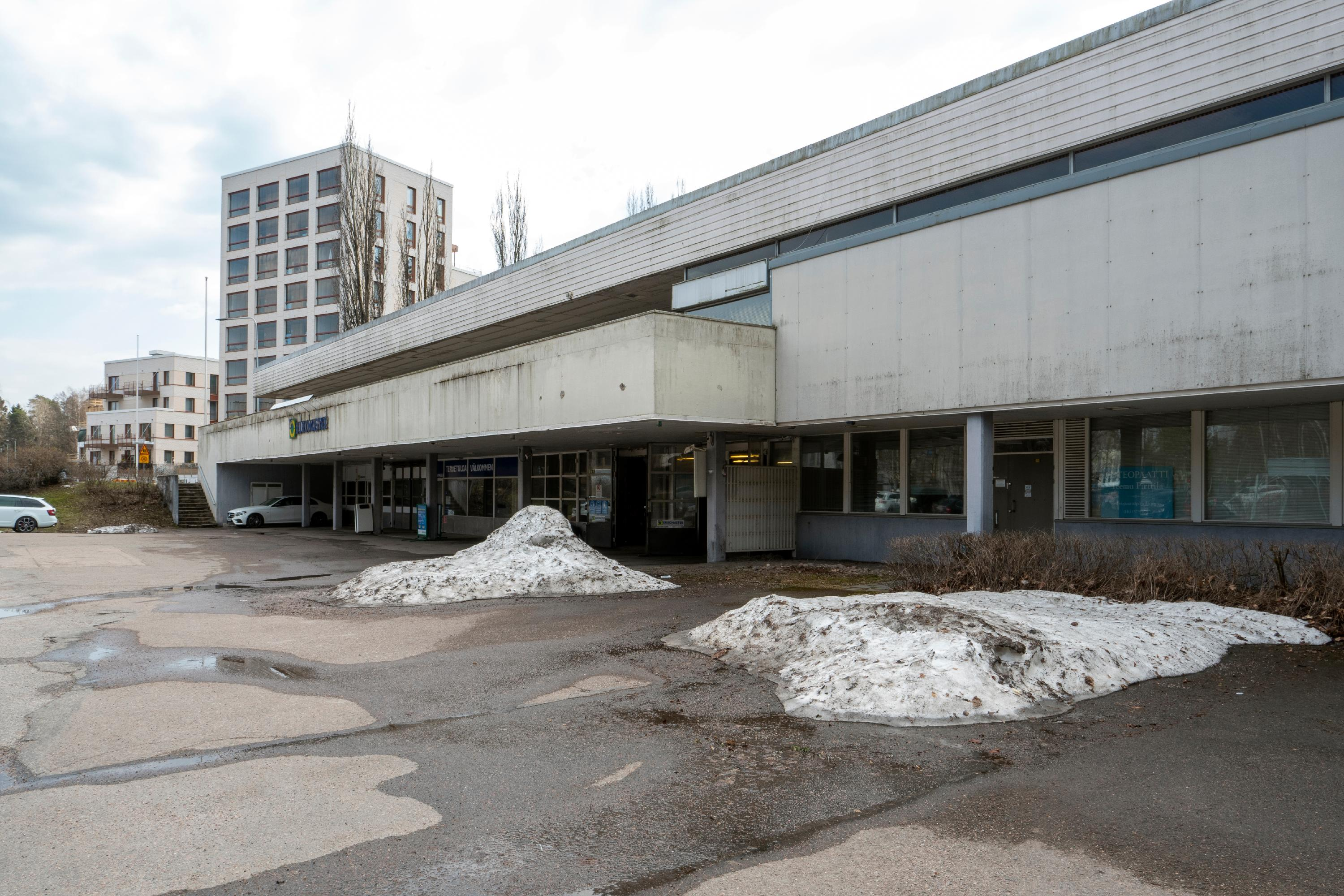
The building seen from the parking lot on its northern side in spring 2023

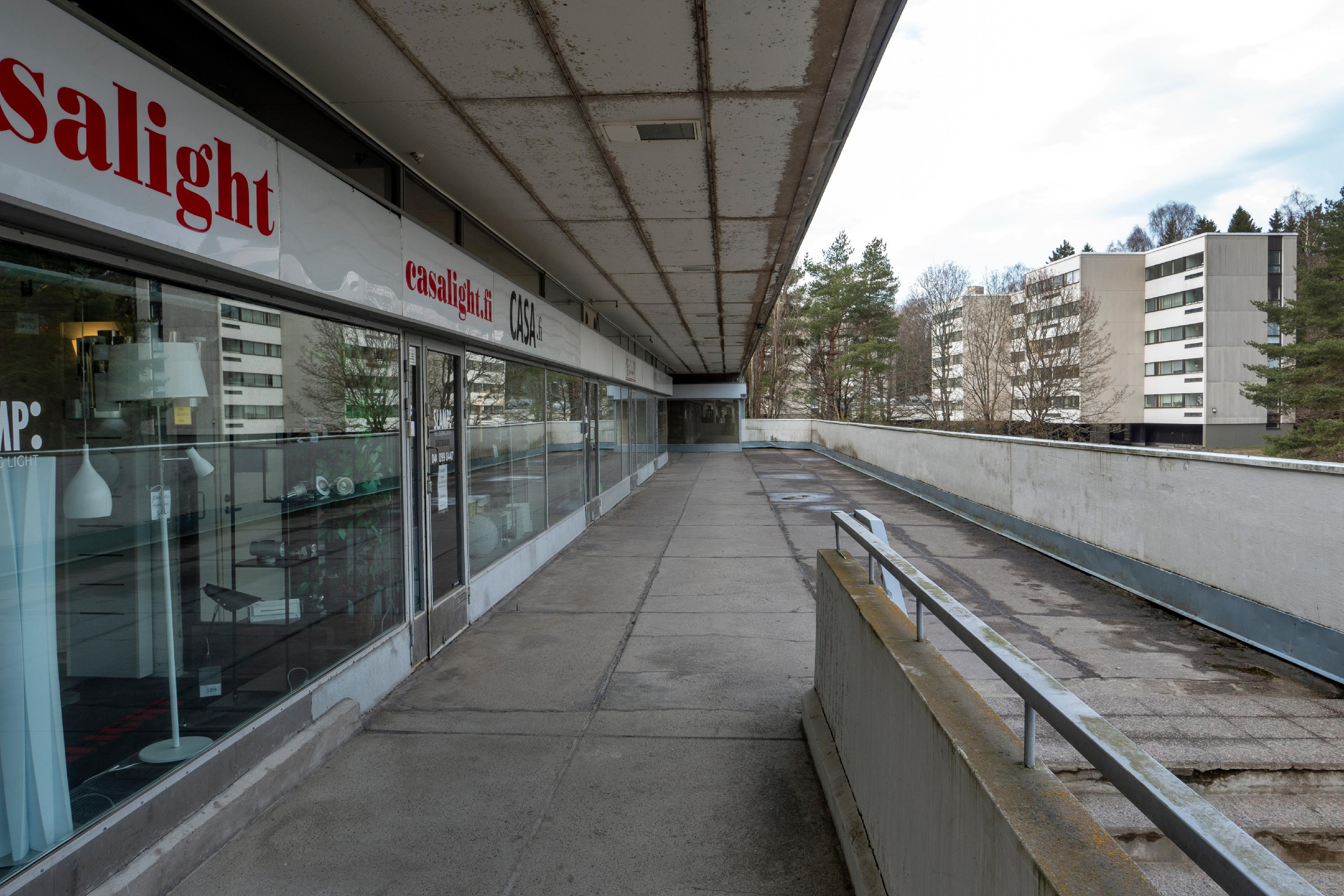
A view of the terrace

The Lehtisaari shopping centre was a two-floor shopping centre located in Lehtisaari, Helsinki, Finland built in 1967. It was designed by the architect Olli Kivinen who was responsible for the zoning of the area. The shopping centre activities stopped in 2023 and the building was demolished in 2025.

== Building ==
According to the Helsinki City Museum, the rectangular-shaped shopping centre had been very thoroughly designed and finalised. The flat-roofed building was prominently horizontal and the facades were ordered in a ribbon-like structure. There was a corridor between the business spaces, leading to an outdoor terrace surrounding the southern and eastern parts of the building. The facades were made of concrete painted white and of facade material painted white.

== History ==
The lower floor of the building hosted spaces originally meant for a filling station, which had since hosted a tire sales company. Other services included a grocery store, a bank and a post office. In the 1980s an unmanned filling station was built on the yard of the shopping centre. The Vantaa Congregation Association which owned the lot leased it to the company Lehtisaaren Liikekeskus which owned the building. The congregations of Helsinki and Vantaa owned the lands of the Lehtisaari island almost completely.

In 2007 the city planning bureau of Helsinki decided that the building should be demolished. The City Council of Helsinki decided the matter in 2009. A sheltered housing facility for old people was supposed to be built on the site of the building. In the end, the facility was built on a lot next to the shopping centre. Permission to demolish the building was given in 2009 and a new zoning plan allowing new construction was approved at the same time. A lot contest held in 2023 was won by the company Hausia Oy, which planned to build three apartment buildings and one terraced house building in place of the shopping centre, with a total of about 80 new apartments. New brick and mortar stores were planned at the ground floor of the apartment buildings.

In 2019 it was reported that all businesses in the shopping centre were still in use; the shopping centre housed a café, restaurants, a kindergarten and a property sales office. Still in summer 2023 there were about 20 businesses at the shopping centre, such as restaurants, offices and a vintage clothing store. The first rent contracts ended in August 2023, and by the end of the same year the rest of the businesses also ceased activities.

In spring 2025 there was news that the building had been vandalised. At the same time Hausia Oy announced it would withdraw from its reconstruction project. The shopping centre was demolished between August and October 2025, and no new construction plans had been made by October.
