= Lehtisaari, Helsinki =

Coordinates: 60°10′43″N 24°51′07″E

Lehtisaari Lövö
- Helsinki Subdivision
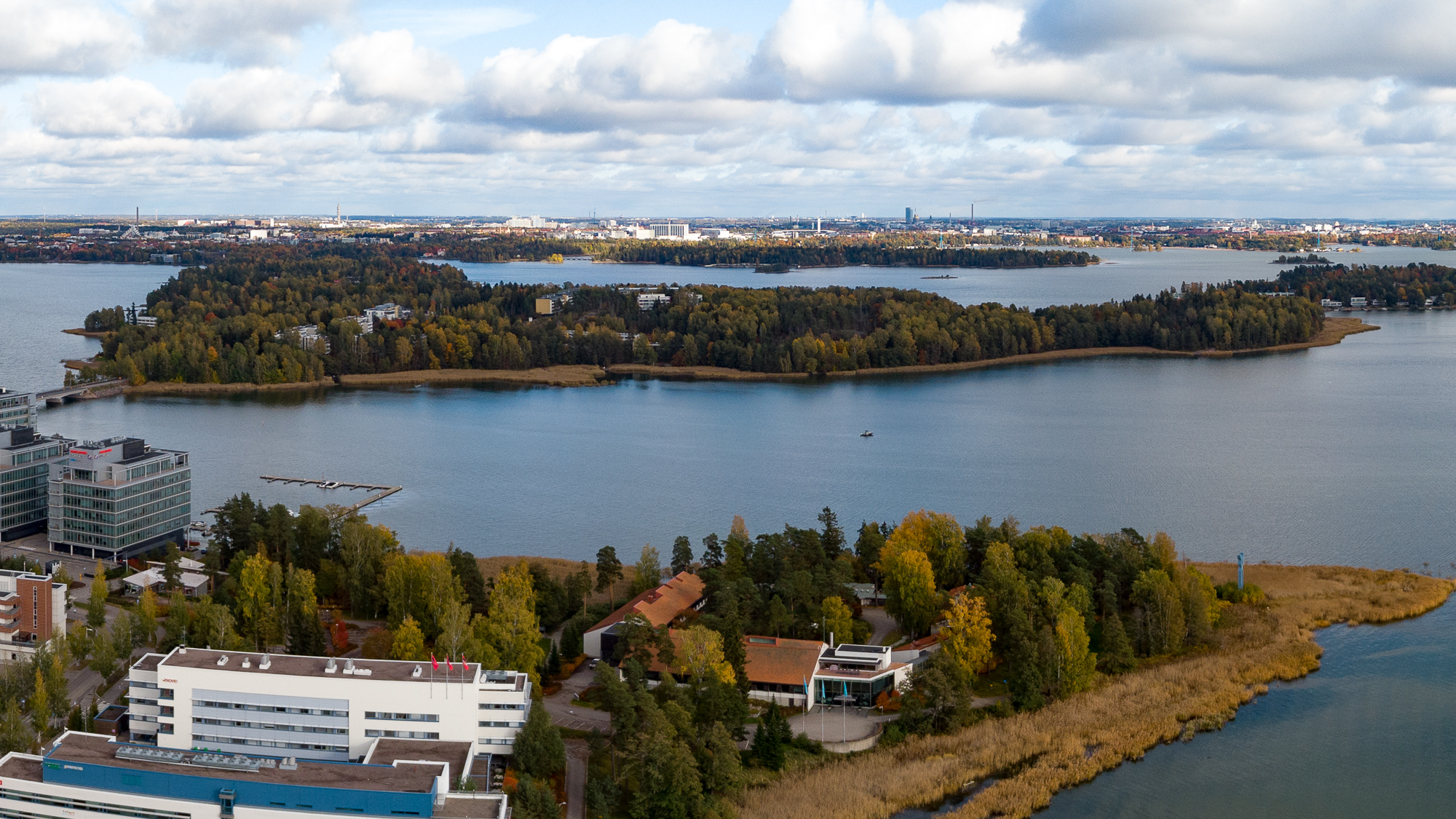

- Position of Lehtisaari within Helsinki
- Country: Finland
- Region: Uusimaa
- Sub-region: Greater Helsinki
- Municipality: Helsinki
- District: Western
- Subdivision regions: is a quarter of the Munkkiniemi neighbourhood
- Area: 0.79 km^{2} (0.31 sq mi)
- Population: 1,152
  - Density: 1,460/km^{2} (3,800/sq mi)
- Postal codes: 00340
- Subdivision number: 303
- Neighbouring subdivisions: Kuusisaari, Lauttasaari, Espoo

Lehtisaari (Finnish: [ˈlehtiˌsɑːri]; Swedish: Lövö; lit. 'Leaf Island') is an island and part of Munkkiniemi, a neighborhood in western Helsinki, Finland.

Lehtisaari's overall appearance is coastal and wooded. Lehtisaari contains a portion of the jogging route that is used by the Helsinki City Marathon. The island's residential zoning began in the 1950s. The island's residential area was mostly built in the 1960s.

The street Kuusisaarentie runs through Lehtisaari from Munkkiniemi to the districts of Otaniemi and Keilaniemi in the neighbouring city of Espoo and to the Ring I beltway. The street includes a small bridge from Kuusisaari to Lehtisaari and a longer bridge from Lehtisaari to Otaniemi near Keilaniemi. Lehtisaari also has a bridge to Kaskisaari, with a narrow and winding street Lehtisaarentie leading there, and also a light traffic bridge to Lauttasaari.

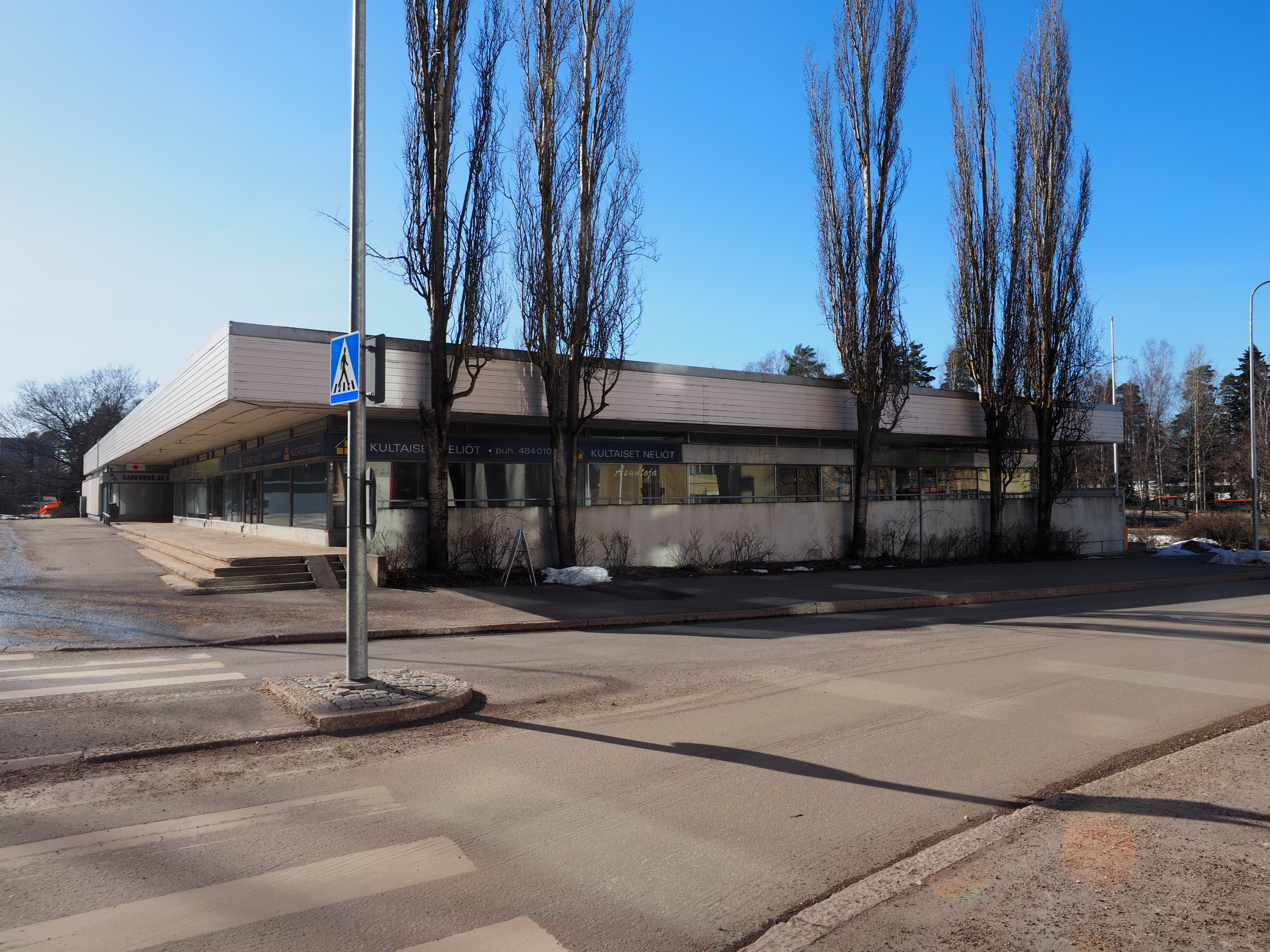
The Lehtisaari shopping centre

Lehtisaari has had a shopping centre built in the 1960s. After a quieter period in the late 1990s the Lehtisaari shopping centre was in nearly completely full use. It had a restaurant, a tire shop, a kindergarten, a café, a space for art galleries, several construction shops, an import office for ship equipment and engines, a financial audit office, an architect bureau, a lawyer office, a building maintenance office, a real estate broker agency, a catering company, a masseur and a carpet shop. The Lehtisaari shopping centre has been completely disused since late 2023 and was demolished in 2025.

According to statistics, Lehtisaari had a total of 205 jobs in the end of the year 2015.

The nature of Lehtisaari is more lush than that of Kuusisaari, especially in the southern part of the island, which functions as a park. There is a walking trail on the eastern shore and a narrow road to Kaskisaari paved with asphalt.

Lehtisaari has been one of the areas in Helsinki where apartment prices have risen the least between 2009 and 2014 and in 2014 the prices have even come down. This is probably because the public traffic in the area has decreased and the diocese owning the rental lots has proposed a significant increase in rent, which would cause increases in costs in housing cooperatives, even though there are privately owned apartments in the area.

Lehtisaari is known as the childhood home of Alexander Stubb, the 13th president of Finland.
