= Kaarle Raade =

Finnish jurist and politician (1866–1945)

Karl (Kaarle) Eugen (K. E.) Raade (14 October 1866 – 16 July 1945; surname until 1906 Randell) was a Finnish jurist and politician, born in Turku. He was a member of the Parliament of Finland from 1916 to 1917, representing the Finnish Party. He was the father of Uolevi Raade.
