= Keilaniemi =

District in Espoo, Finland

Coordinates: 60°10′16″N 024°49′39″E

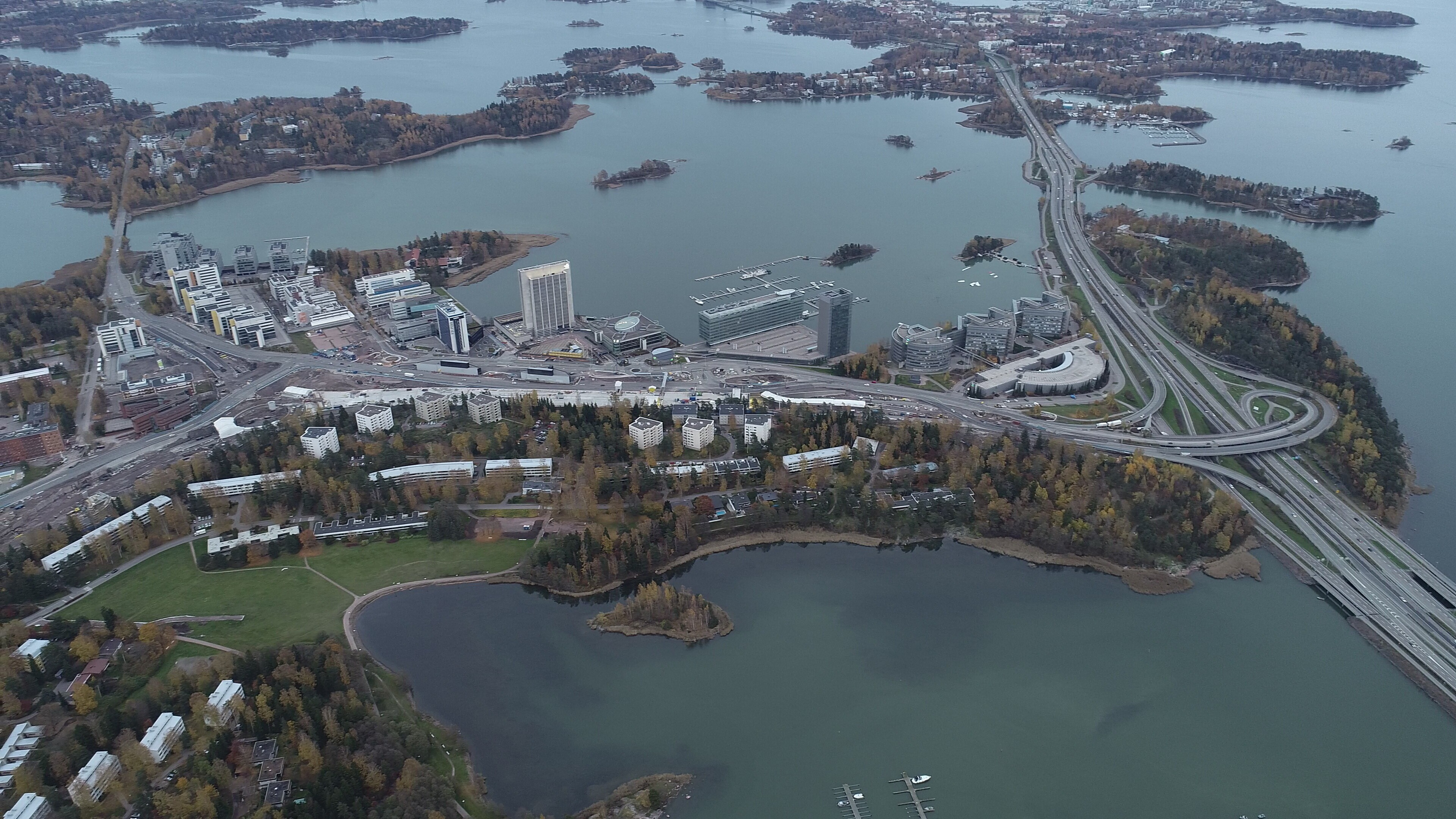
An aerial view of Keilaniemi.

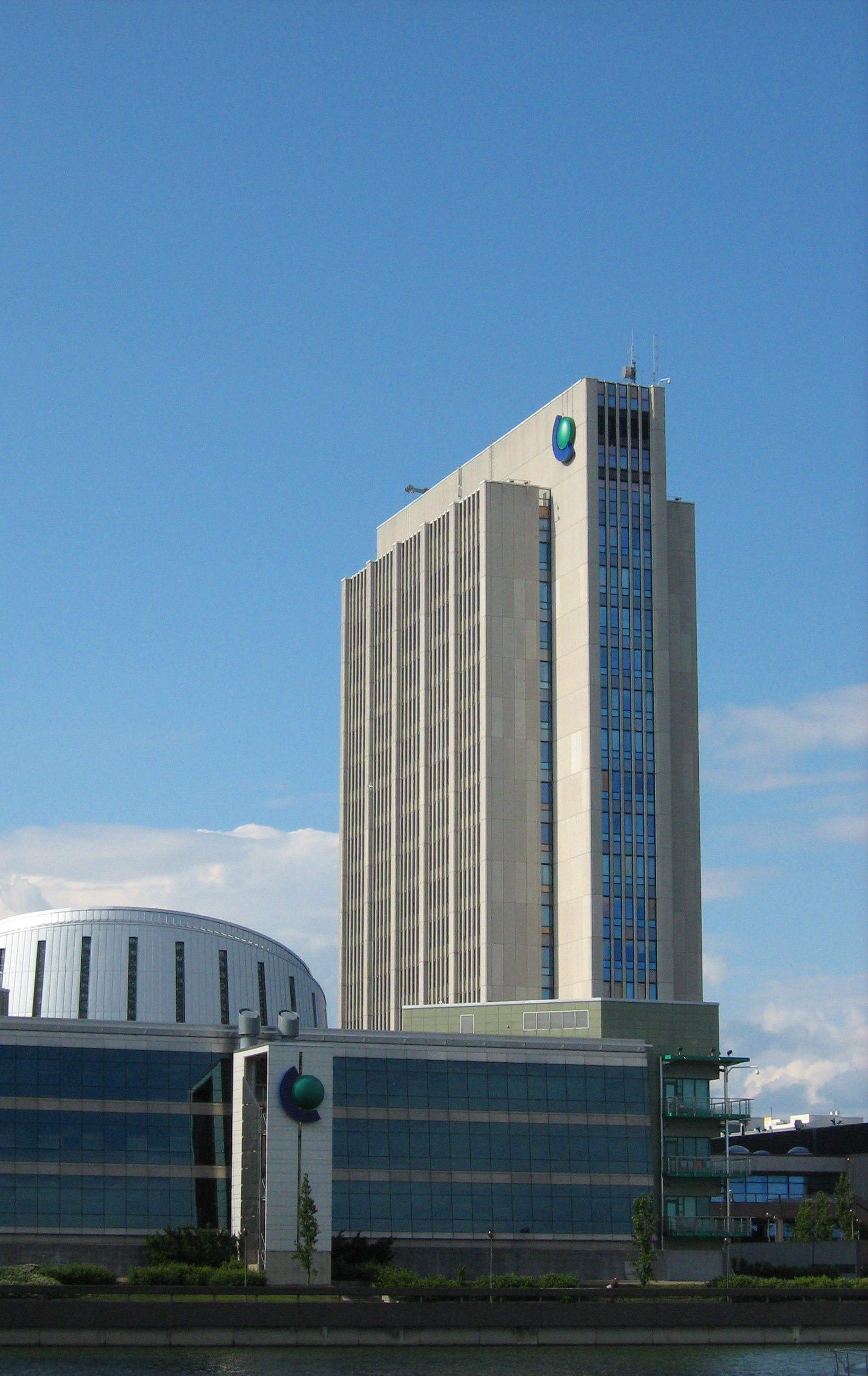
Finago Tower is located in Keilaniemi.

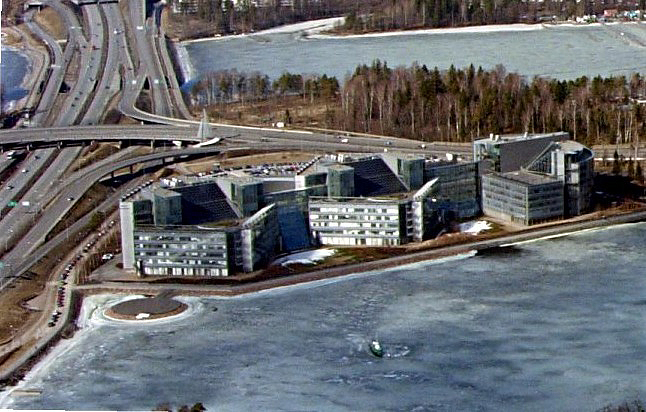
The Tieto Keilalahti Campus.

Keilaniemi (Finnish pronunciation: [ˈkei̯lɑˌnie̯mi]; Swedish: Kägeludden; lit. 'pin cape') is a neighbourhood in the south-eastern part of Espoo, Finland. Keilaniemi is one of Finland's most important corporate hubs. The metro opened in 2017 as part of the Länsimetro extension.

== History ==
Keilaniemi is part of the district of Otaniemi. The medieval Otaniemi village, which consists of Keilaniemi and the current areas of Tapiola and Westend, originally belonged to the Hagalund manor. The manor has been owned by the families von Wright, von Numers, Sinebrychoff and Grahn.

A particular time of splendour for the manor was the ownership by the Sinebrychoff family from the 1860s to the 1920s. The manor served as the summer resort for the family, which was in fashion at the time. The people wanted to visit the unspoilt nature, and thanks to steam ship traffic, wealthy families in Helsinki could acquire summer villas at the peaceful countryside next to Helsinki.

The Sinebrychoff family ordered extensive repair and extension work in the Hagalund manor. They changed it to a well-kept model farm and also took notice of the farming and forestry economy. The benevolence and fair treatment of staff by the Sinebrychoff family was appreciated, and the family became known as "the good people of Hagalund". Thanks to this good reputation, the people at the farm were left in peace during the Finnish Civil War, unlike many other families.

The traffic connection to Helsinki improved greatly when the Jorvaksentie road was completed in 1937, which attracted the attention of people needing apartments to the sparsely-populated southern Espoo, which could previously only have been reached by ship. Arne Grahn, who owned the mansion at the time, sold off some of the lands as zoned lots, and from the 1930s to the 1950s the villa town of Westend, the garden city of Tapiola as well the Helsinki University of Technology and the science community in Otaniemi rose on the lands.

In 1949, the Kansallis-Osake-Pankki bank started commissioning vacation homes and an entertainment centre for their staff in northern Keilaniemi. The collective, designed by architect Aarne Ervi, included 50 summer cottages, two saunas and the Otaniemi Casino built in 1951, currently housing the restaurant Keilaranta. The vacation resort served as a training centre for the bank from 1954 and as the training centre of the Finnish state from the 1970s. A separate training building has later served as the headquarters of the Finnish sugar manufacturer Sucros and the shipping company Tallink Silja.

== Geography ==
Keilaniemi is bordered by the university district of Otaniemi to the north, the commercial/residential district of Tapiola to the west, the Keilalahti bay separating Espoo and Helsinki to the east, and the Gulf of Finland to the south. The distance from Keilaniemi to the centre of Helsinki along the Länsiväylä highway is about 8 km.

There are numerous islands and islets in Keilaniemi, including Fröknarna and Leppäluoto.

== Offices ==
Keilaniemi is a high-rise business district mostly known for the numerous head offices of large corporations located there. The district includes the head offices of Tieto (in land formerly occupied by Nokia), Microsoft Finland, Kone, Fortum, Neste Oil, Valmet, and many smaller corporations such as Rovio Entertainment. The large office buildings serve as landmarks in the area. Keilaniemi rose to the position of a corporate concentration in 1976, when the Finago Tower (formerly Fortum Head Office) was built there. The 20-storey building is still one of the tallest office buildings in Finland.

== New construction ==
Significant new construction in Keilaniemi is planned: construction of new tower blocks for office and residential use has been approved, and there have been alterations to the ground level in the vicinity of the metro station, including the introduction of cafes, to make the area more "urban".

There are plans for four circular apartment buildings in Keilaniemi, with the highest of which has 40 storeys. The building would be 127 metres tall above sea level. Two of the other houses would have 36 storeys and the fourth would have 32 storeys. The buildings would contain a thousand new apartments. The buildings have been designed by the architecture bureau SARC and they would be constructed by SRV.

There are plans to build a 26-storey high-rise building in the area. Fortum is also building a new 16-storey building next to its original building. Other buildings in the area include Elisa, Microsoft and Kone. Life Science Center consists of five buildings of 7 to 11 storeys, containing offices of various companies. These will be accompanied by six buildings of 7 to 10 storeys, for example the Neste head office and HTC Keilaniemi were built in 2008 and 2009. There are also plans to connect Keilaniemi to the neighbouring areas of Tapiola and Otaniemi with new buildings. The Ring I beltway passing between Keilaniemi and Tapiola will go in a tunnel with a cover with a park over it. This park will serve as a recreation area for both Keilaniemi residents and inhabitants of neighbouring areas. There are also plans for new parks, a boulevard and reuse of the coast as a public space.

The trend of new corporate construction has continued in the 2020s. Fiskars Group moved its headquarters to a new building in Keilaniemi in early 2022, constructed by NCC. Another significant office project, Keilaniemen Portti, began construction in 2023. The 14-storey building is being developed by Varma and will become the head office for CSC – IT Center for Science upon its completion, which is expected by the end of 2026. Other planned developments include the 20-story Fööri office tower.

== Improvement of the area ==
The Keilaniemi area has been part of the Energizing Urban Ecosystems (EUE) research project by the research institute Tekes, aiming to develop future urban ecosystems according to the principles of sustainable development. The T3 area, consisting of Otaniemi, Keilaniemi and Tapiola, is planned to become a unique activity and development environment for universities, companies as well as the public and third sectors. The project is coordinated by RYM Oy. Other participants include SRV, Fortum, Kemira, Kone, the city of Espoo and the environmental services of the Helsinki region (HSY). Research institutes include various branches of the Aalto University and the Finnish Environment Institute (SYKE).

== Transport ==
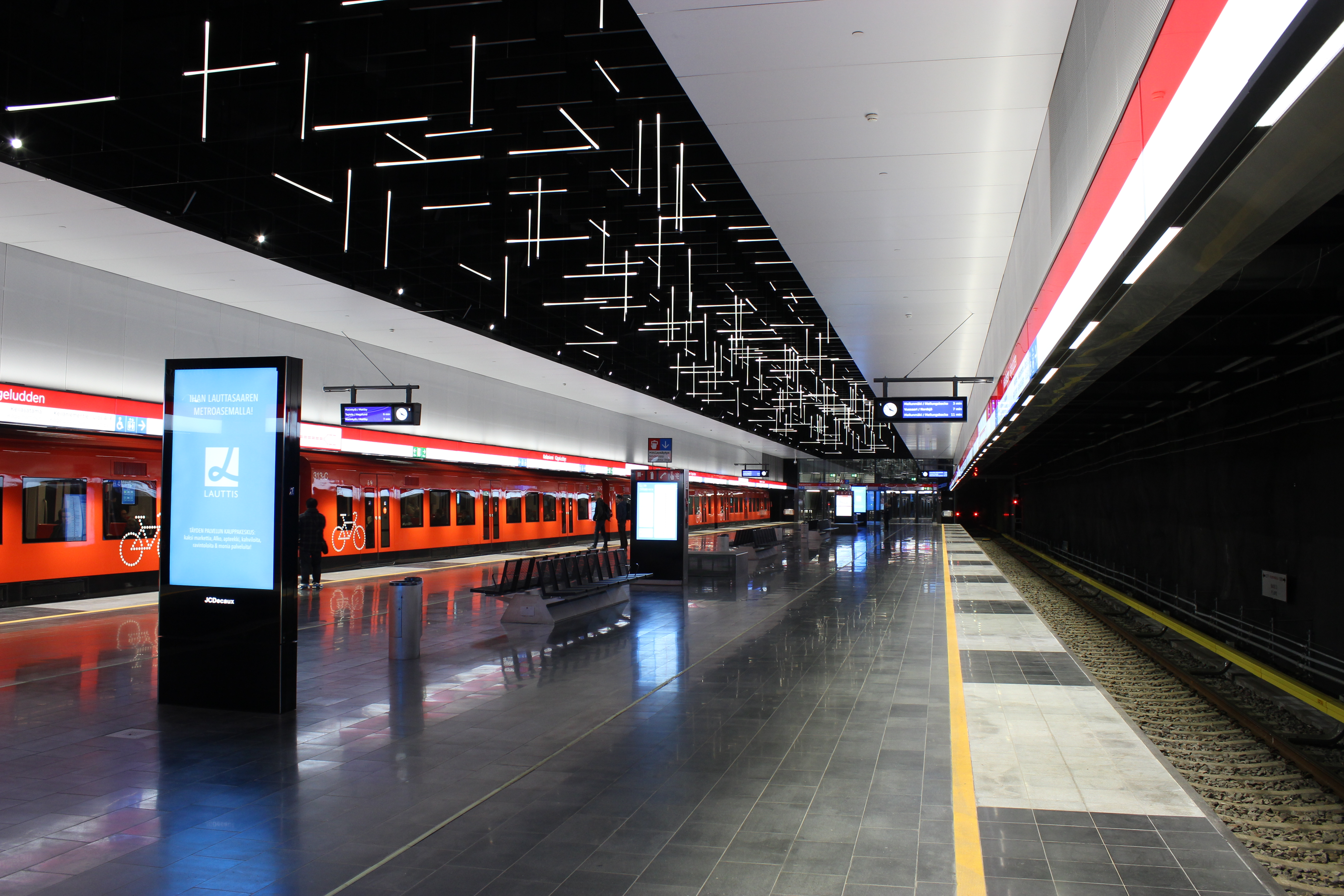
The Keilaniemi metro station.

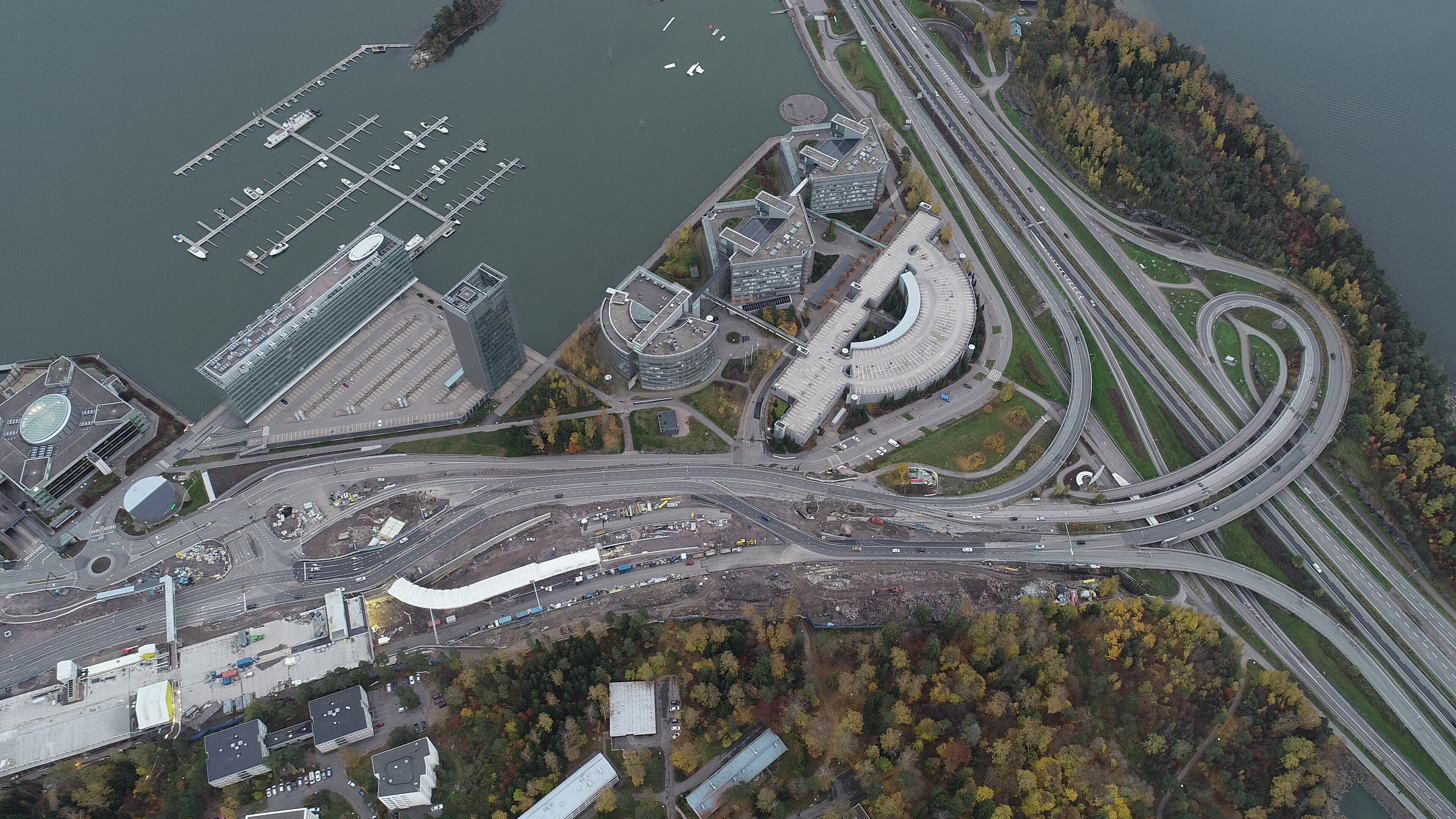
The intersection between Ring I and Finnish national road 51.

Keilaniemi is located at the intersection between Länsiväylä and Ring I. Keilaniemi is served by a station of the Helsinki metro. The extension (Länsimetro) was completed in 2017. The area can be accessed via all buses travelling along Länsiväylä. The area also has a bus connection via Leppävaara to western Vantaa.

The Jokeri light rail, also known as Line 15, has its terminus in Keilaniemi. The line began operations in October 2023, connecting Keilaniemi to Itäkeskus in Helsinki and enhancing cross-town travel.

There is also a small boat harbour in Keilaniemi.

Immediately south of Keilaniemi proper, there is the small peninsula of Karhusaari, where a 19th-century mansion, the Sinebrychoff mansion, is located. The mansion, owned by the City of Espoo, houses the Karhusaari Art Centre and is used for weddings and other events.

== Panorama ==
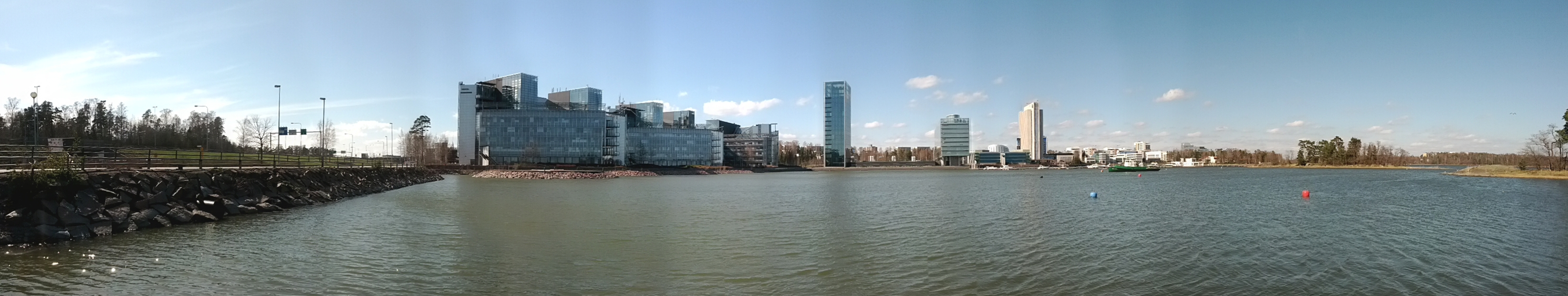
Panorama of Keilaniemi, seen from Keilalahti bay.

== See also ==
- Keilaniemi metro station
- Keilaranta Tower
- Districts of Espoo
