= Karhusaari Art Centre =

Coordinates: 60°10′2.19″N 24°50′7.48″E

The Karhusaari Art Centre (originally known as Villa Sinebrychoff / Villa Karhusaari) is a Neo-Renaissance wooden villa situated on a high stone base in Karhusaari in south-eastern Espoo, Finland. It has been described as the most architecturally interesting of the 19th century villas in Espoo.

Björnholm, known in Finnish as Karhusaari, is these days a north-eastern part of Westend, a large part of which is covered by the Länsiväylä highway running to the north of the art centre. Björnholma was separated for the use of Nicolas Sinebrychoff from the Hagalund manor owned by the Sinebrychoff family in 1890. The villa was designed by architect Karl August Wrede; he had returned from Italy at the time, and the Italian influence in the villa's design is clearly visible. The villa includes a special flat roof with wide eaves. The villa had once also been a small farm with its economic buildings, some of which still remain. Some of the buildings, such as the pier with its changing room were demolished when the Länsiväylä was built.

Also the interior decor of the villa represents Neo-Renaissance. The ceiling paintings, the panels and the masonry heater have been artistically made.

Right next to the villa there are defence walls dating back to the Crimean War.

Villa Sinebrychoff played the part of a Roman villa in the melodrama Katariina ja Munkkiniemen kreivi directed by Ossi Elstelä in 1943.

== Images ==
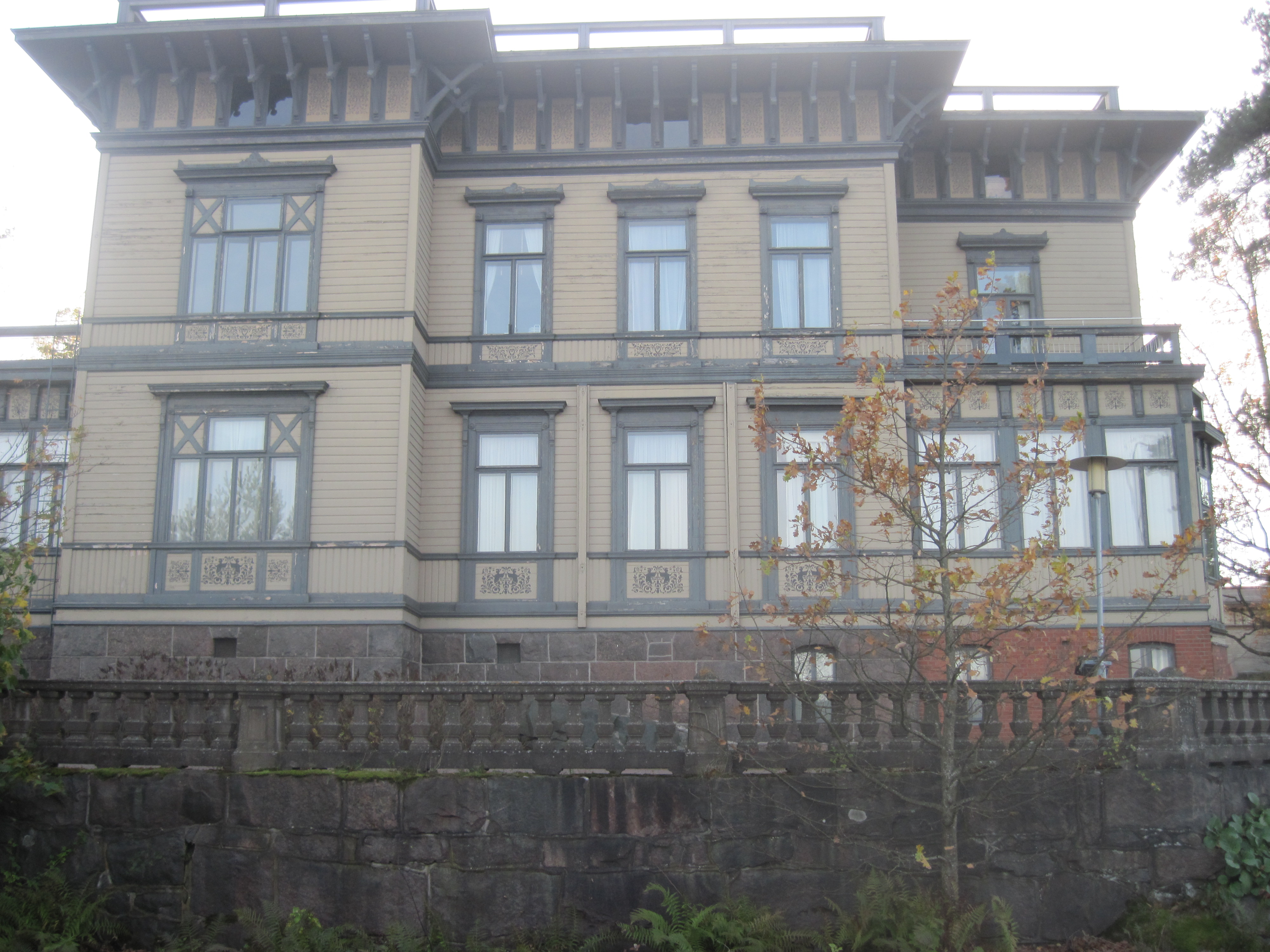
The Karhusaari Art Centre viewed from the pedestrian route running next to the Länsiväylä highway.

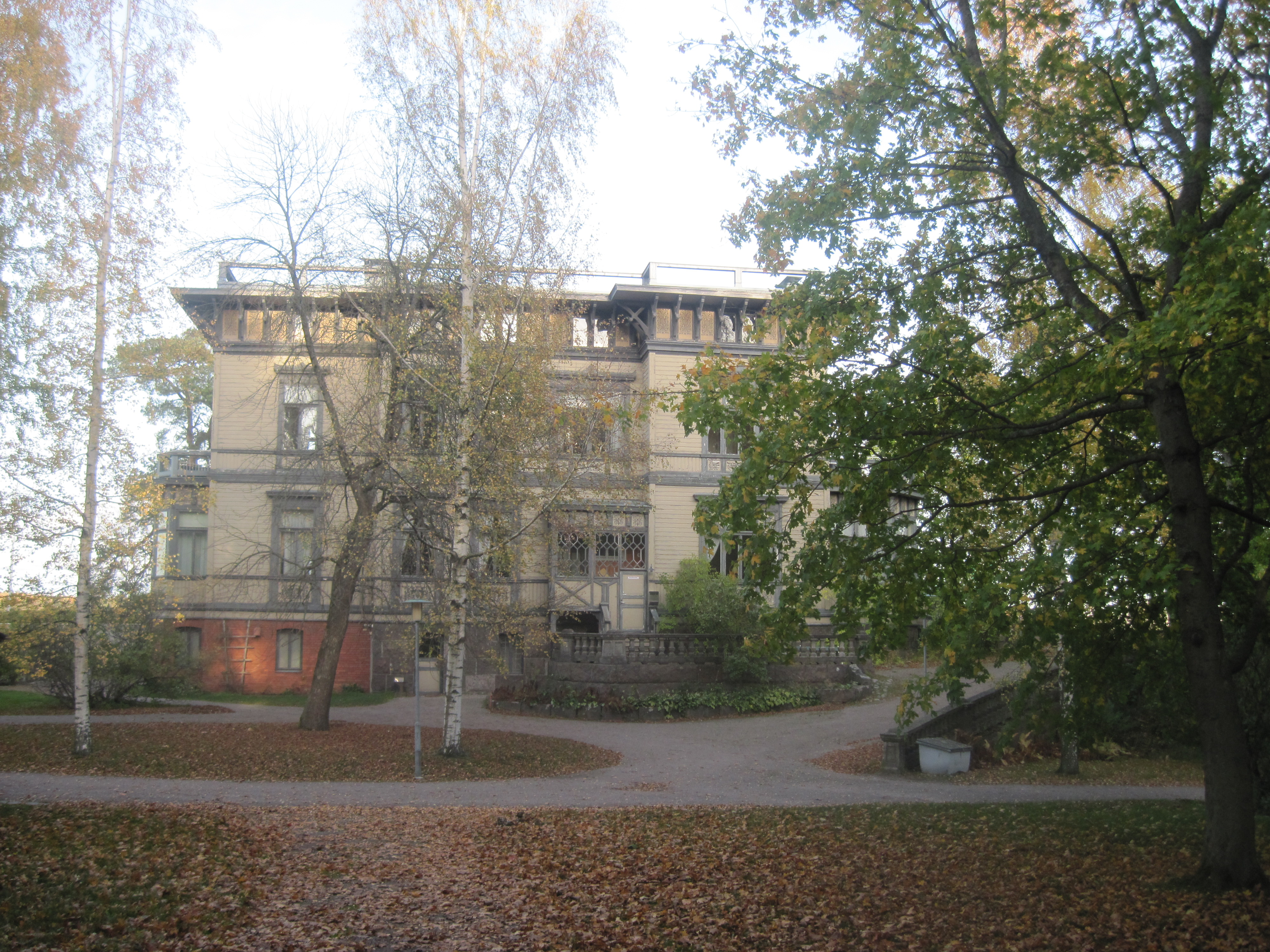
The Karhusaari Art Centre viewed from the inner yard.

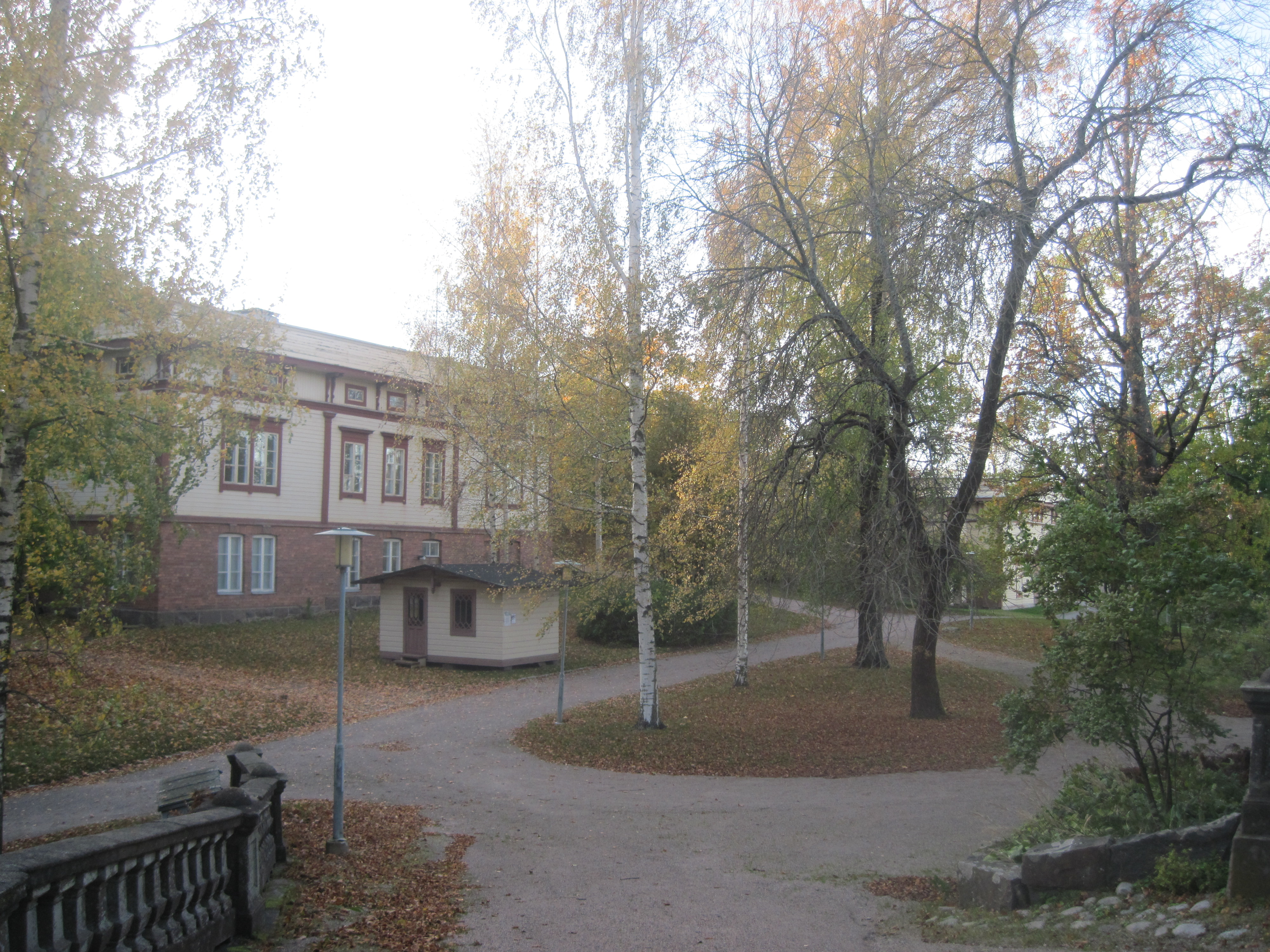
Yard buildings of the Karhusaari Art Centre.

== Sources ==
- Härö, Erkki: Espoon rakennuskulttuuri ja kulttuurimaisemat : Byggnadskulturen och kulturlandskapet i Esbo. Second, revised edition. Helsinki: Espoon kaupunginmuseo / Esbo stadsmuseum, 1991. ISBN 951-857-182-1.
