= Keilaranta Tower =

Unbuilt building in Finland

Keilaranta Tower was a planned high-rise building to be built in Keilaniemi, Espoo, Finland. After completion it would have been 117 metres tall with 26 floors, which would have made it Finland's highest office building and one of the highest buildings in Finland overall.

The building was commissioned and invested in by the insurance company Ilmarinen. The constructor and lessor of the premises was Hartela. The tower would have offered spaces for about 3000 people, and there would have been be 1200 parking places in the vicinity. Keilaranta Tower would have been designed by the architecture bureau Pekka Helin & Co.

Information on the building's height varies upon the source. This article uses Ilmarinen's press release from 30 April 2014.

Construction of the building was never started. In 2016 Ilmarinen and Hartela presented a new concept of a hybrid project to build a high-rise office building, a hotel and apartment buildings at the spaces on Keilaranta 9 and Keilaranta 11. This hybrid project was never started either. There were numerous attempts to start the construction, but the long time it would take for the construction of a project of this scale and for the building's end users to commit to it has practically prevented the project from happening, according to the materials of the city of Espoo. Hartela has withdrawn from the project.
