= Tieto Keilalahti Campus =

Office building in Espoo, Finland

Coordinates: 60.17°N 24.829°E

Tieto Keilalahti Campus/Microsoft Talo
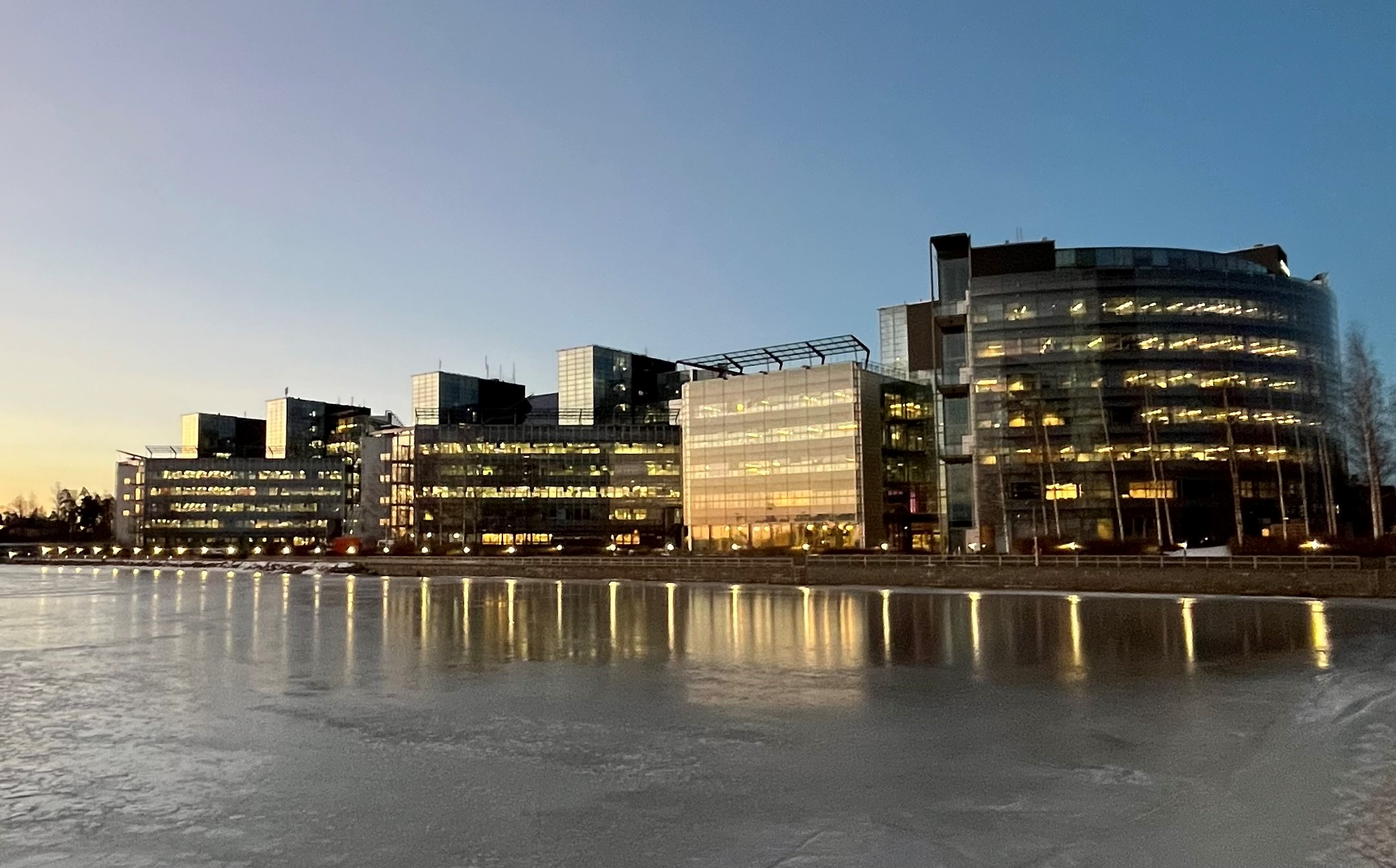
- Built: 1997
- Location: Keilalahdentie 4, Keilaniemi, 02150 Espoo; Espoo, Finland
- Architect: Pekka Helin, Tuomo Siitonen
- Area: 38,300 m^{2} (412,000 sq ft)
- Volume: 200000 m³
- Owner: Deutsche Asset Management

Tieto Keilalahti Campus/Microsoft Talo (formerly named Nokia House) is the head office building of Tieto, Microsoft Finland and Fortum located in Keilaniemi, Espoo, just outside Helsinki, the capital of Finland.

== History ==
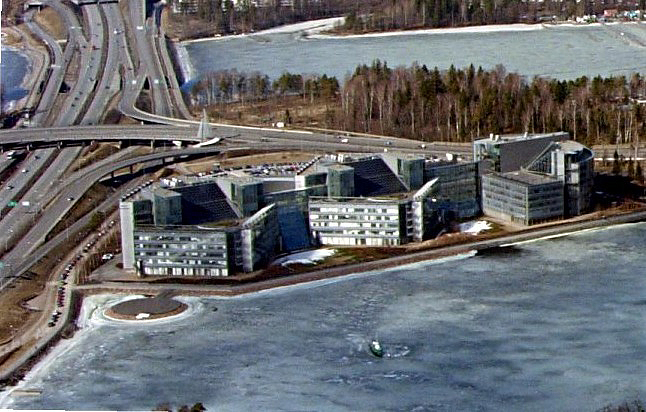
Aerial view

The campus was built between 1995 and 1997 as headquarters for Nokia by architect Pekka Helin. It comprises three separate structures: The two most southern parts of the building were built in the early 1990s and the third, most northern part was built in 2000.

Nokia operated in the building from 1997 to 2014, with around 5000 employees working in the premises. They owned the building up until December 2012, when it was announced that it had been sold to Finland-based Exilion for €170 million. Nokia continued using the building as its head office, leasing it on a long-term basis. The building was transferred to Microsoft Mobile as part of the sale of Nokia's mobile phone business to Microsoft in April 2014, at which point the building was renamed Microsoft Talo (literally Microsoft House). Nokia subsequently relocated its headquarters to its former Nokia Networks offices in Karaportti to the north.

In 2015 Tieto announced its intention to move its head office to part of the building, with the move taking place in early 2017. Microsoft Mobile closed down in 2017 when its assets were acquired by HMD Global, however, Microsoft is still a major tenant in the building complex, where they usually held events like the Keilaniemi Toastmasters until 2021.

In December 2017, Exilion sold the building to Germany-based Deutsche Asset Management (part of Deutsche Bank) for 164 million euros.

== Gallery ==
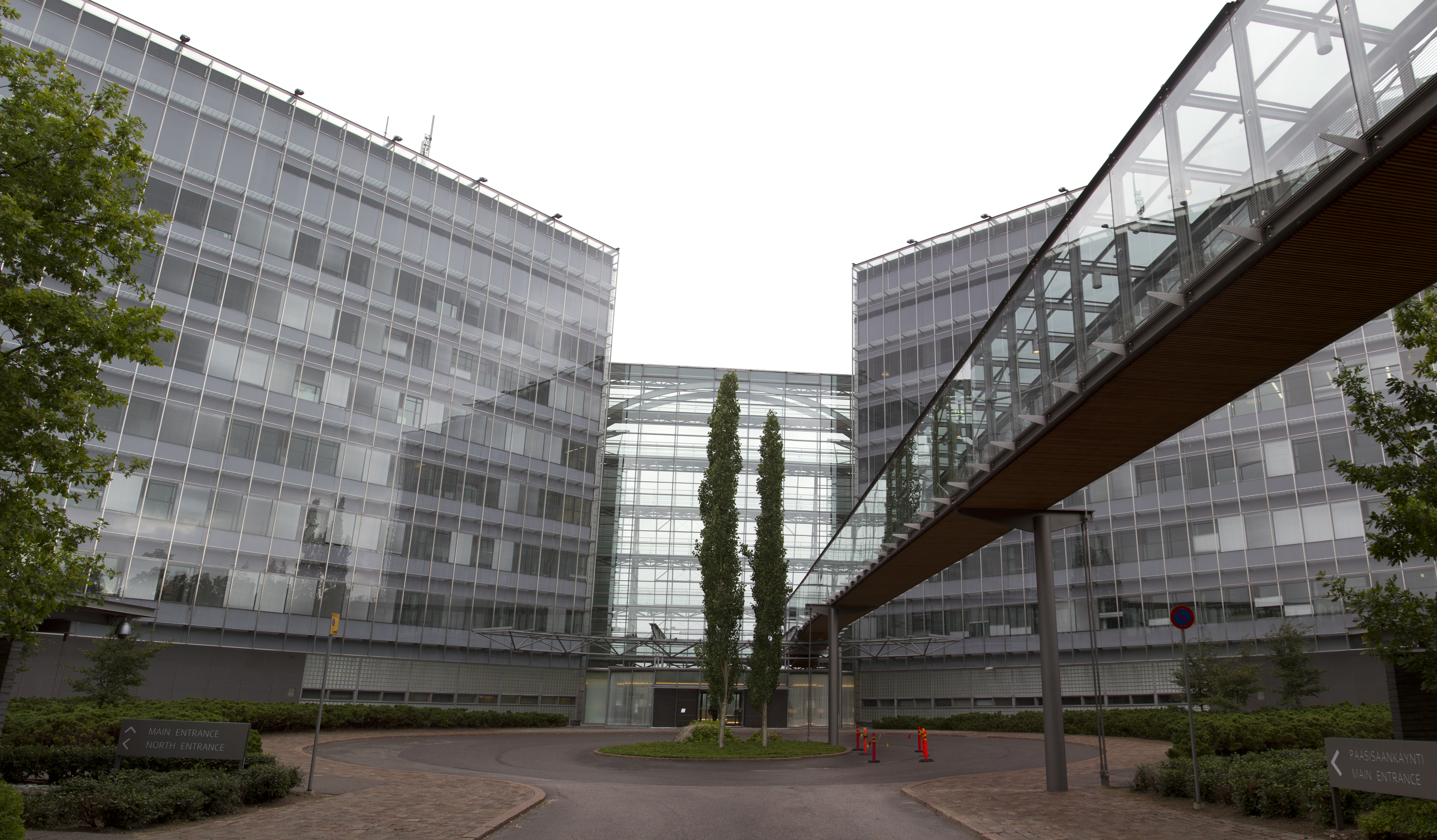
Main entrance

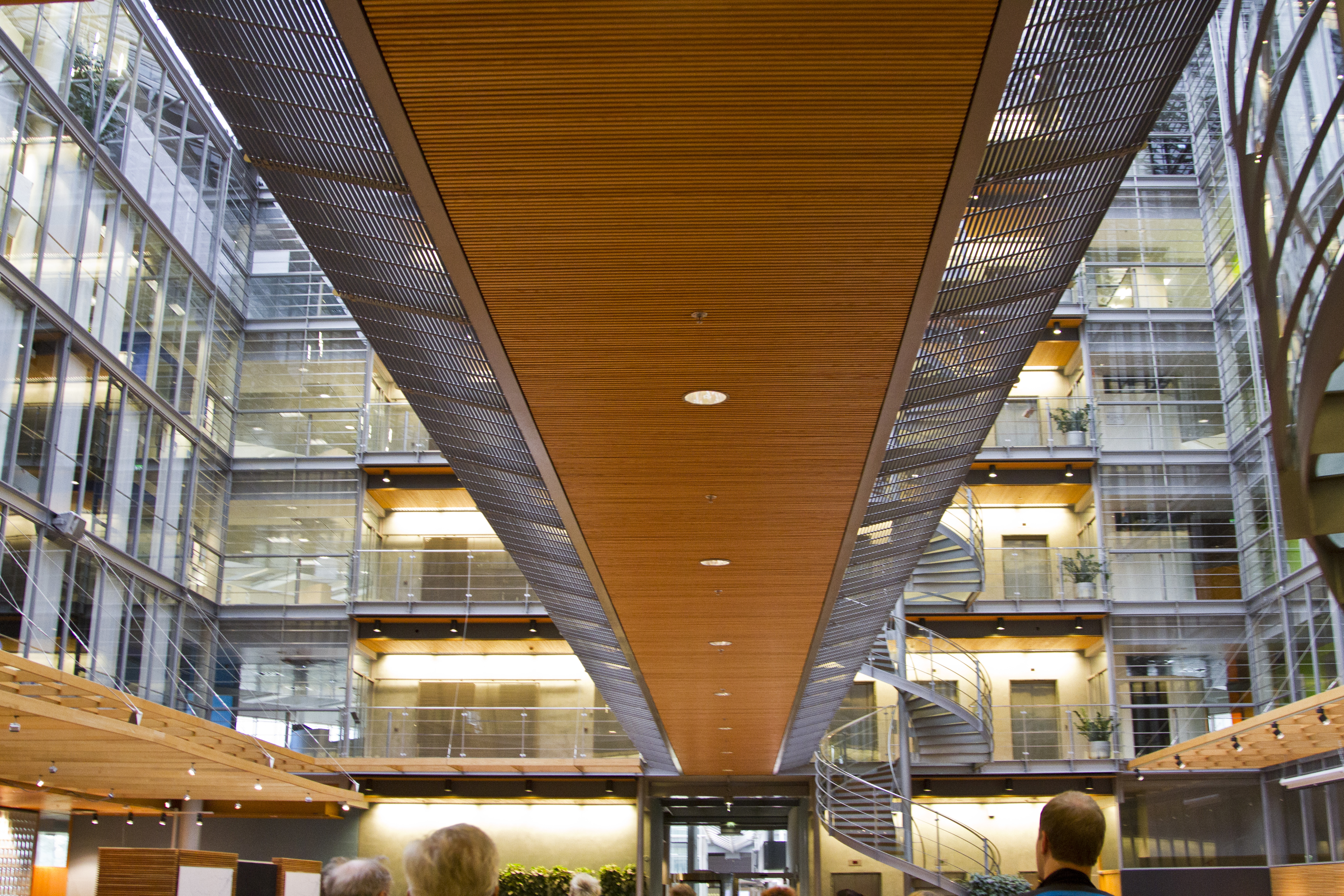
Inside

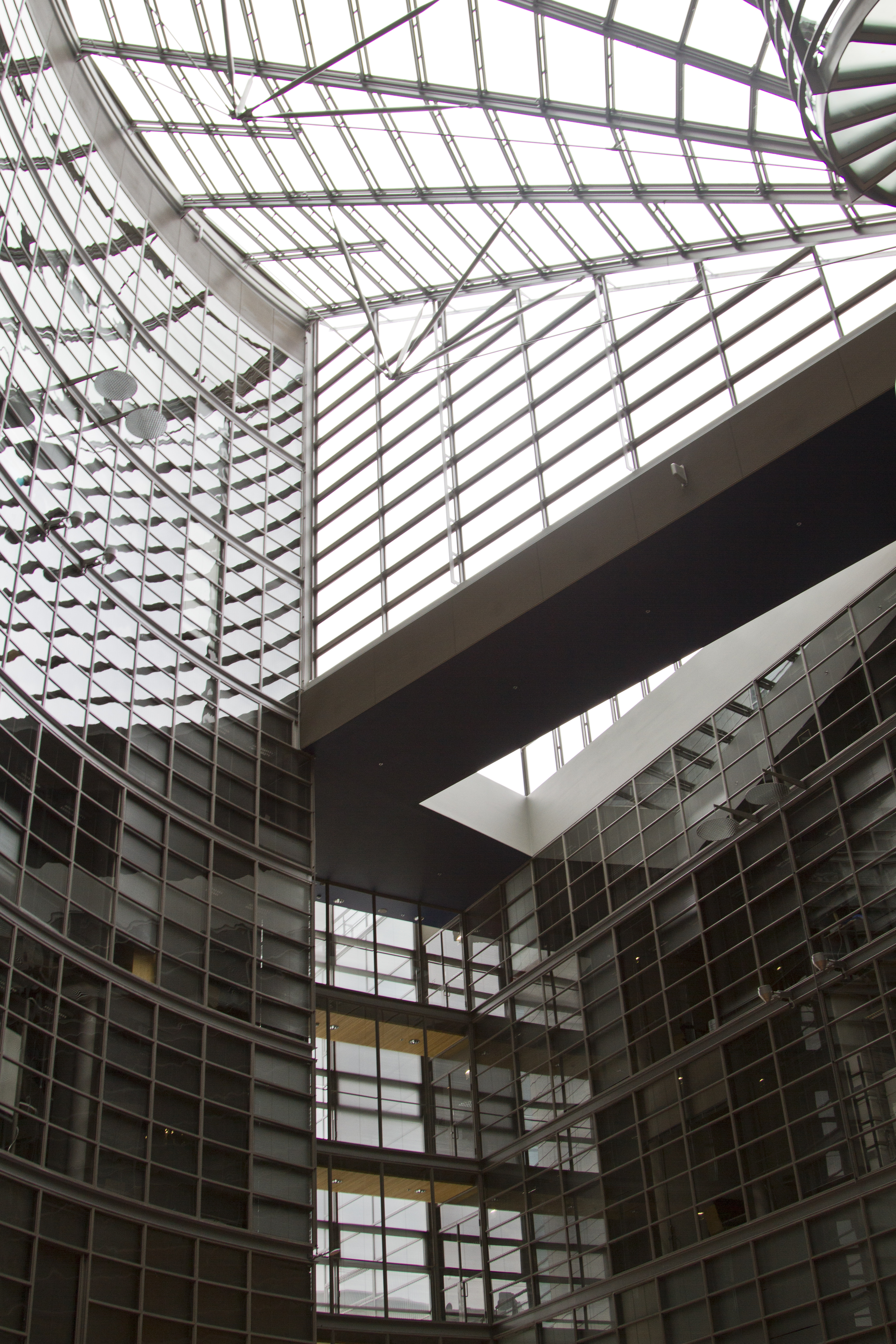
Inside

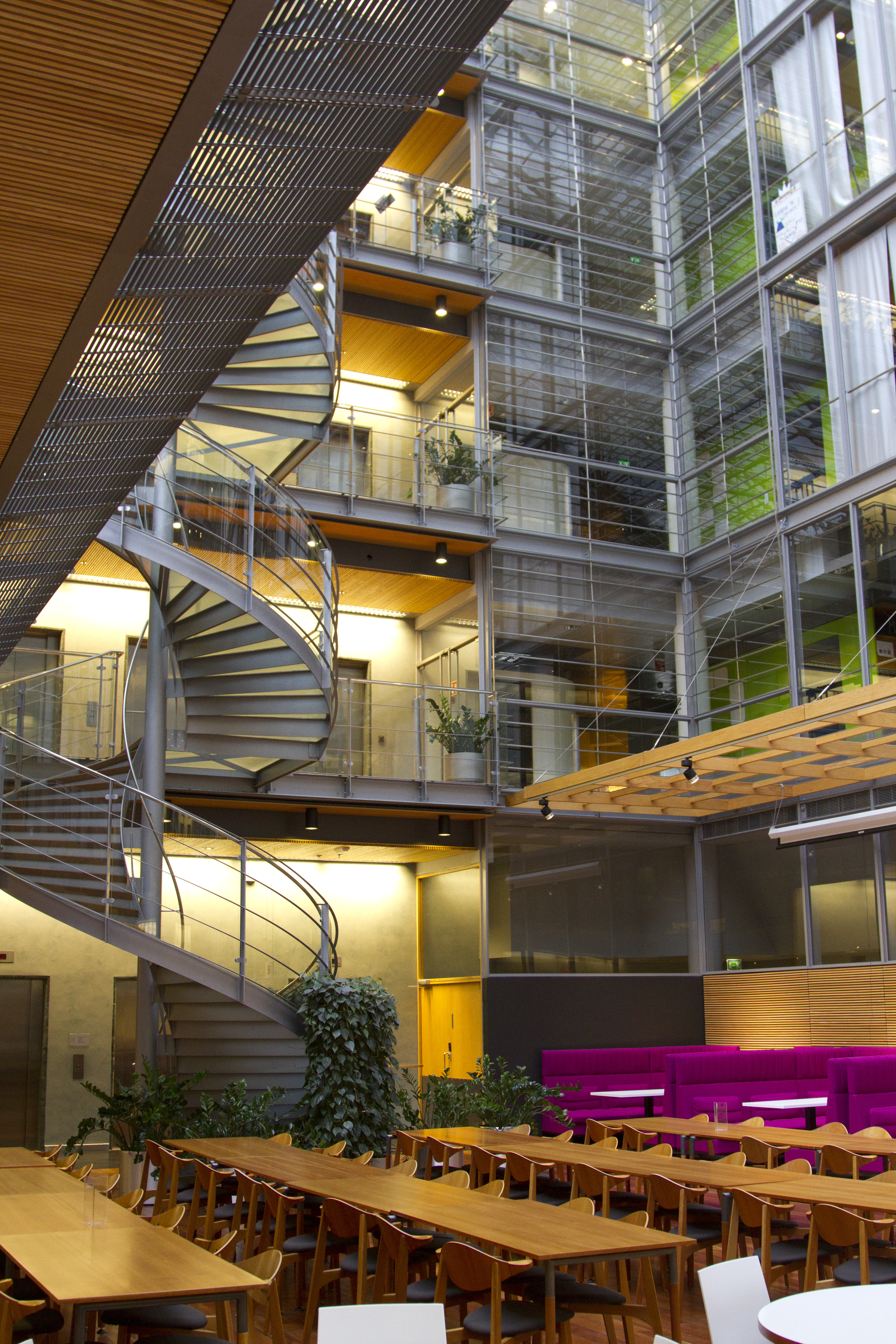
Inside

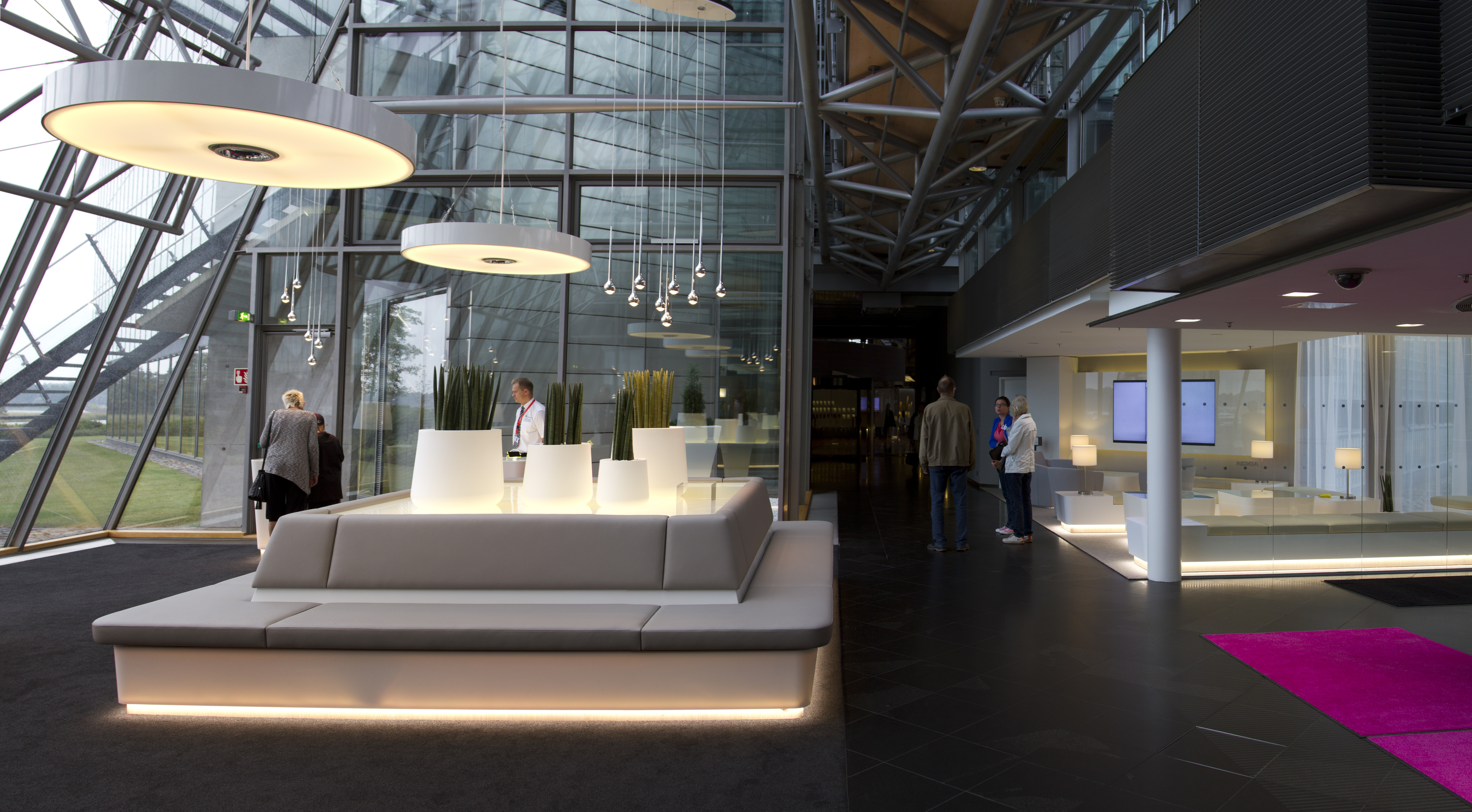
Inside

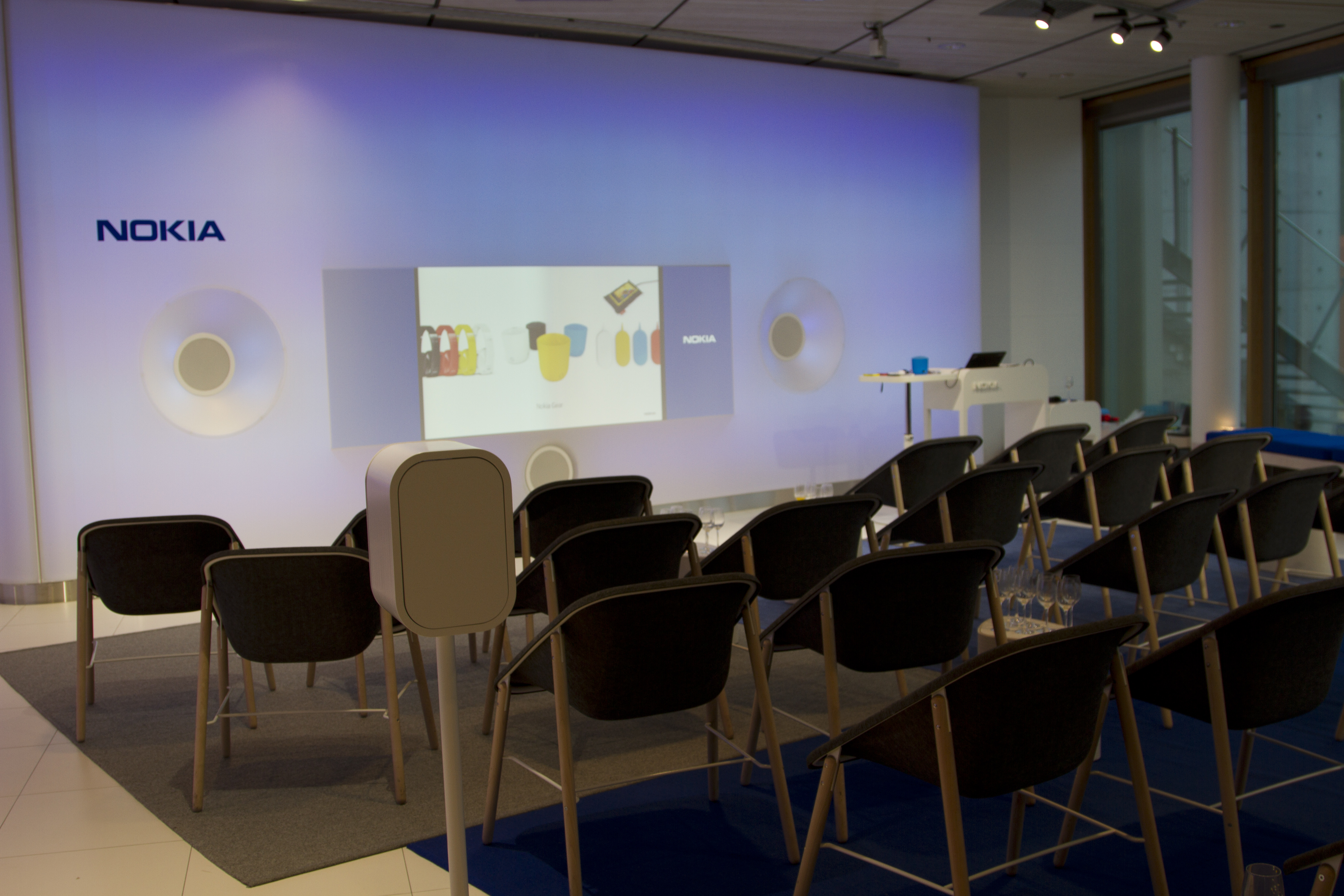
Inside

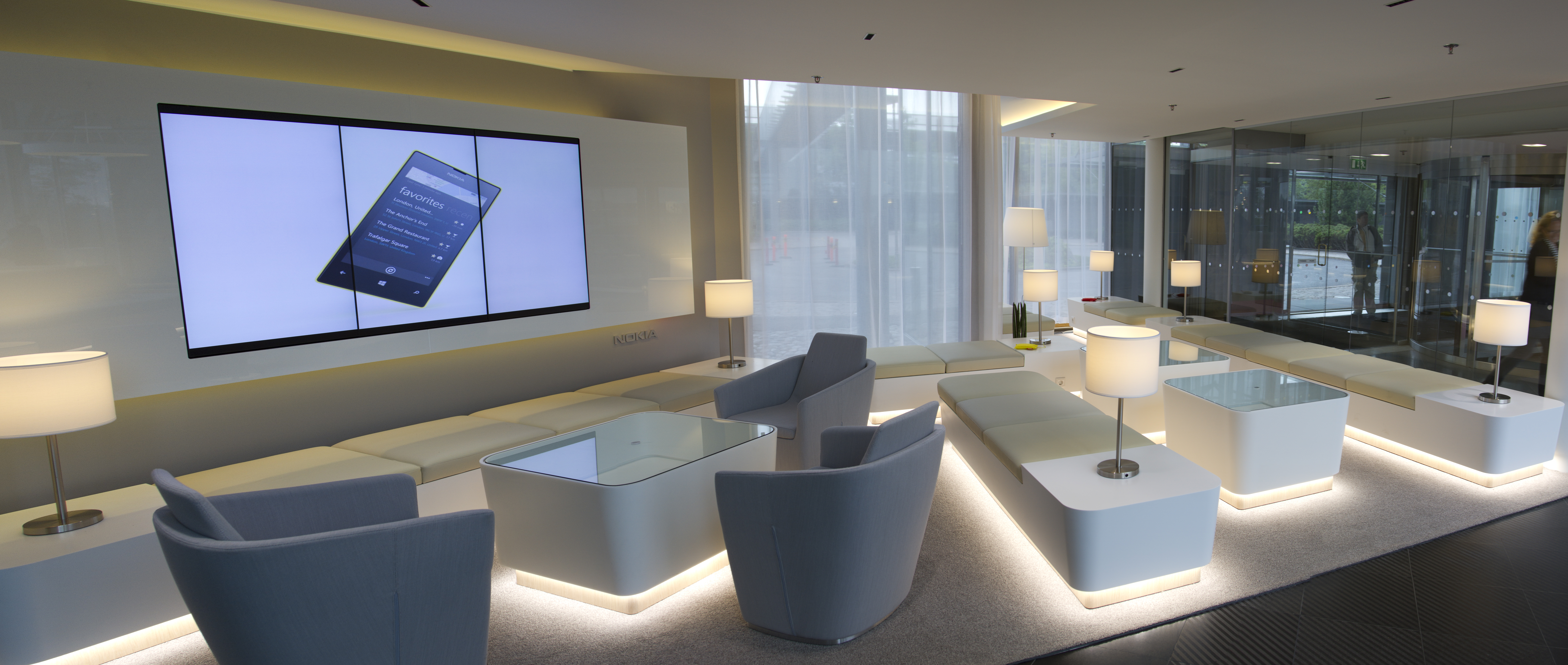
Inside

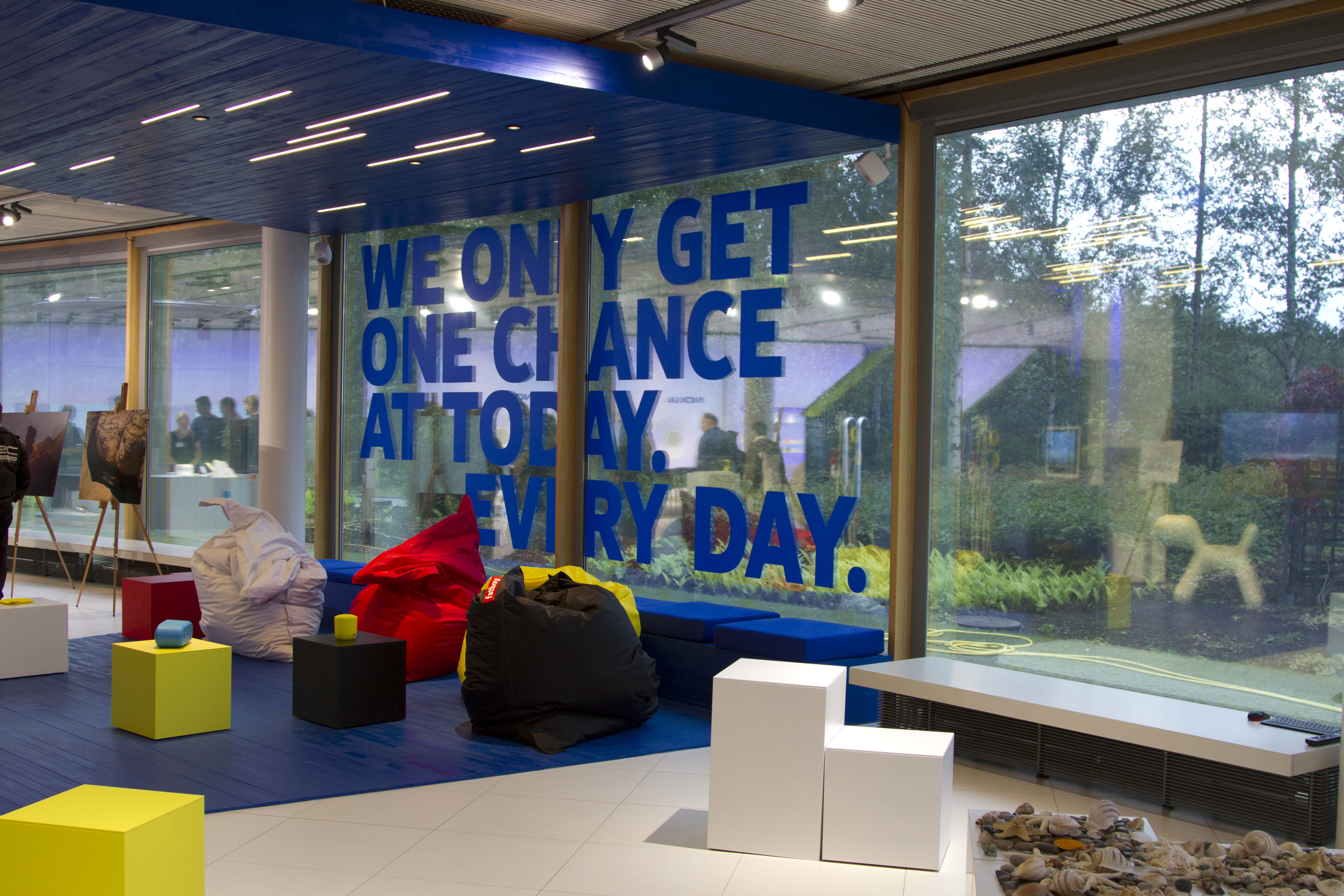
Inside

== See also ==
- Apple Infinite Loop campus
