= Hagalund manor =

Coordinates: 60°10′56.6″N 24°49′12.3″E

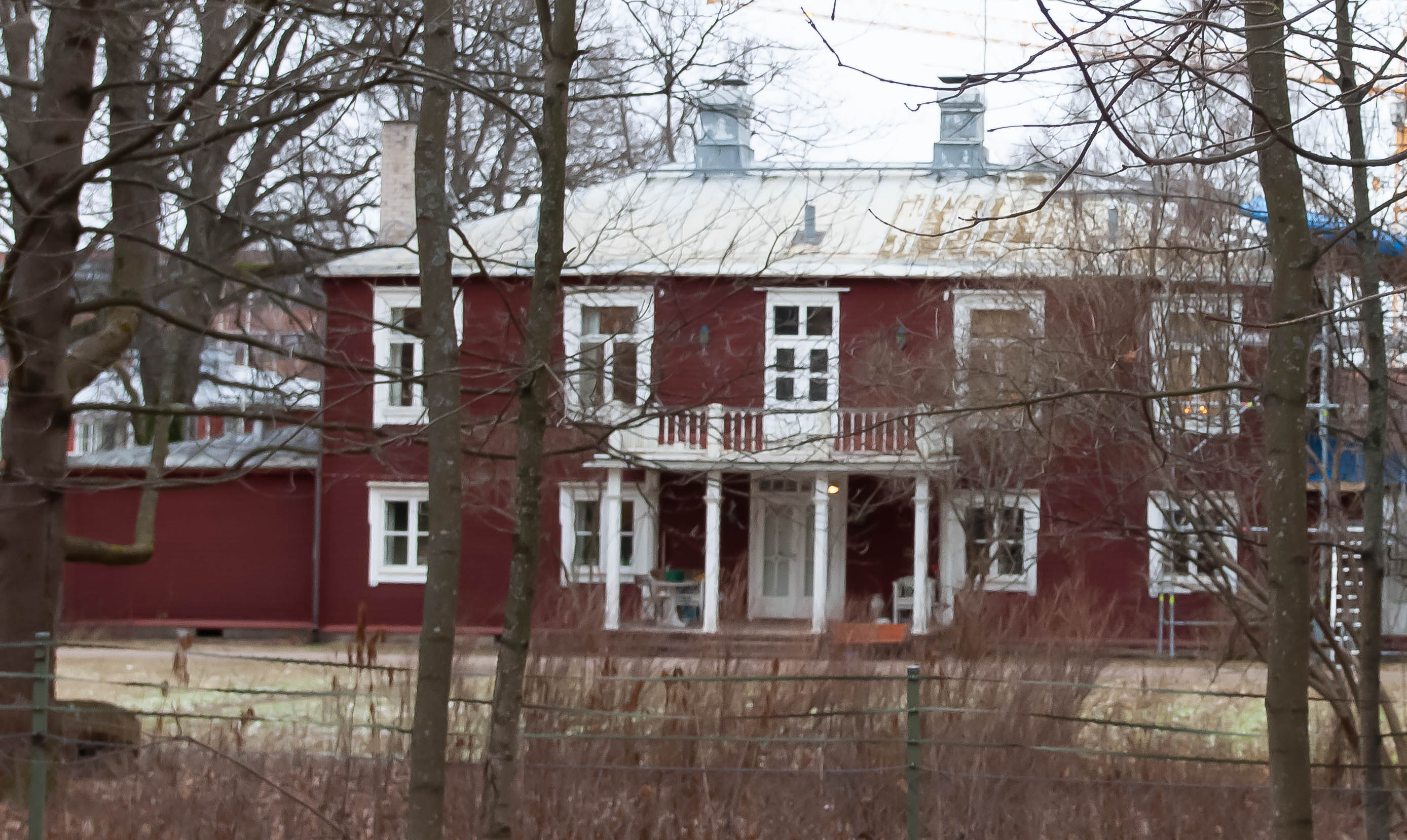
The main building of the Hagalund manor.

The Hagalund manor (Finnish: Hagalundin kartano, Swedish: Hagalund gård) is a manor in Espoo, Finland located in the Tapiola and Otaniemi areas. It has been owned by the families of von Wright, von Numers, Sinebrychoff and Grahn.

The history of the manor starts from the 1540s. The main building is from the early 19th century, it was built by Carl Johan von Numers. From 1857 the manor was owned by Pavel Sinebrychoff. In the 1920s it was transferred to Arne Grahn, nephew of Fanny Sinebrychoff, widow of Pavel Sinebrychoff's son Paul Sinebrychoff. In the 1950s the substantial lands of the manor were converted into a residential area, which later formed into Tapiola and part of Otaniemi.

Of the buildings in the manor, the main building and three old residential and economical buildings remain in Otaniemi in connection to the campus area of Aalto University. The Tapiola riding school is located at the stables of the manor.

The Hagalund manor is also connected to the history of the Otnäs manor.
