= Accountor =

Finnish finance management company

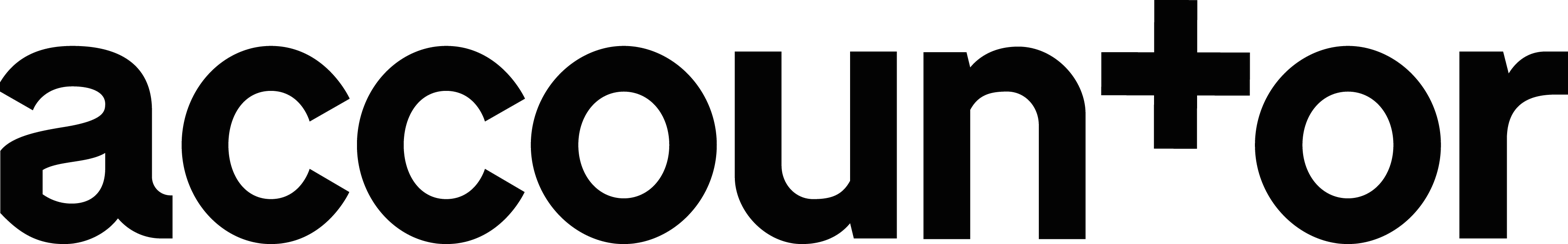
- Type: Subsidiary
- Industry: Financial Administration
- Founded: 1944
- Products: Statutory accounting, Tax, VAT and other legal reporting, Management accounting, Controller services, Payroll processing, HR Services.
- Revenue: Group c. €318 million (2024)
- Number of employees: Group employees 3100 (2024)
- Parent: Aspia Group
- Website: https://www.accountor.com/en

Accountor (formerly known as Pretax Group) is a provider of accounting, payroll, HR and advisory services operating in Finland, Sweden, Norway and Denmark. Founded by Asko Schrey and headquartered in Espoo, Finland. The company became part of Aspia Group in July 2024.

Following the acquisition, Accountor's operations were integrated into Aspia, a Nordic provider of accounting, payroll, tax and advisory services. The group employs approximately 3,100 people and operates in Finland, Sweden, Norway, Denmark, the Netherlands and Ukraine. In 2024, the group reported revenue of approximately €318 million.

Since the acquisition, the Accountor brand has been replaced by the Aspia brand in Finland, Sweden, Norway and Denmark. The business continues to operate under the Accountor brand in the Netherlands and Ukraine.

Prior to 2024, Accountor Group consisted of both outsourcing and software businesses. The software portfolio included products such as Procountor, Isolta, Apix, Mepco and eTasku. Following the sale of the outsourcing business to Aspia in 2024, the software business temporarily continued under the name Accountor Software before being rebranded as Finago. KKR acquired a majority stake in the company from Vitruvian Partners in July 2024.

== History ==
Accountor traces its origins to Pretax, an accounting firm founded in Finland in 1986 by Asko Schrey. In 2000, Pretax merged with Konekirjanpito, another Finnish accounting company. This merger created the largest accounting firm in Finland at the time, with 350 employees.

As Pretax grew, it expanded beyond Finland through a series of acquisitions and partnerships in the Nordic countries and elsewhere in Europe. This internationalization phase began in the late 1990s and early 2000s, and Pretax progressively established a presence in Norway, Sweden, Denmark, the Netherlands, Russia, and Ukraine, and expanded to ultimately serving companies of all sizes, from SMEs to multinational corporations.

In 2013, Pretax adopted the unified "Accountor" brand, consolidating more than a hundred acquired local companies under a single identity.

In July 2024, Aspia Group acquired Accountor's outsourcing business, integrating it into its accounting, payroll, tax and advisory services operations. Following the transaction, the outsourcing operations became part of Aspia but continued to operate under the Accountor brand.

Following the acquisition of the outsourcing business, the software business operated temporarily as Accountor Software before being rebranded as Finago. KKR acquired a majority stake in the software business from Vitruvian Partners in July 2024.

In 2026, the Accountor outsourcing business was rebranded as Aspia in Finland in February, Norway in March and Denmark in May. The Accountor brand continues to be used in the Netherlands and Ukraine.
