= Kytö =

Island in Espoo, Finland

Coordinates: 60°3′54″N 24°43′5″E

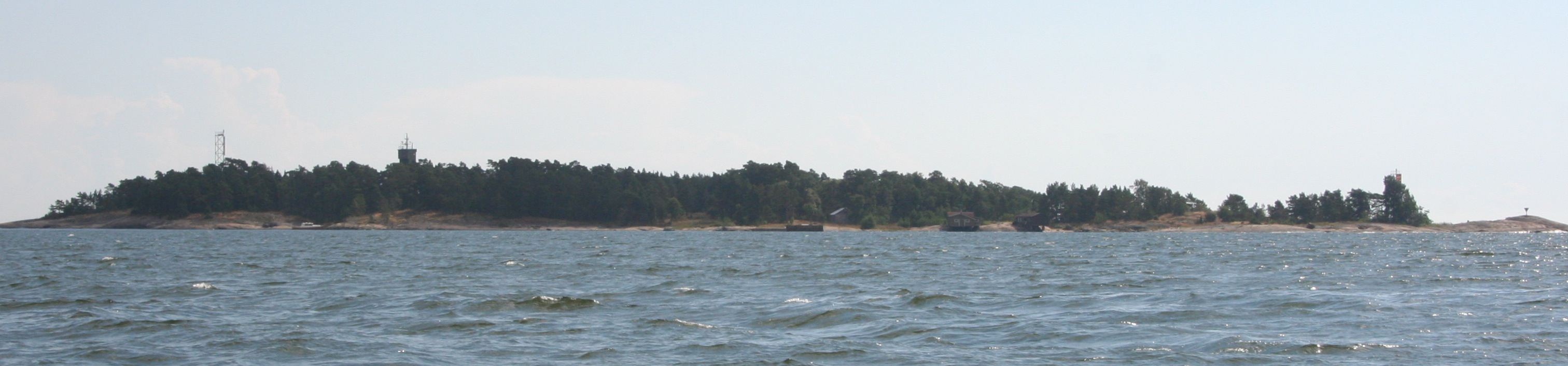
Kyto - One of the Espoo southernmost island

Kytö is an island in Espoo, Finland. It is one of Espoo's southernmost islands, and beyond it lies mostly only open sea. For decades, Kytö was used by the Finnish Defence Forces as a private training ground, and admittance to it was severely restricted. However, in the early 2000s, the Defence Forces abandoned use of the island, and since then there has been discussion about who really owns the island. Three parties have claimed it as their property: the Defence Forces, the City of Espoo, and a private family who claims that their ancestors owned the island already in the 19th century.

In 2005, the verdict of the highest court in Finland was that the Island is privately owned by the family.
