= History of trams in Helsinki =

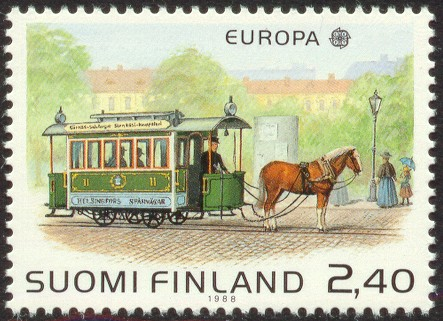
A Finnish postage stamp depicting a horse-drawn tram in Helsinki.

Until 2021, Helsinki was Finland's only remaining city with tram traffic. Two other cities—Turku (see Trams in Turku (1908–1972)) and Vyborg (Finnish: Viipuri, Swedish: Viborg, Russian: Вы́борг; now part of Russia)—have had tram systems. Vyborg abandoned its trams in 1957 after it was ceded to the Soviet Union after the end of World War II. Turku withdrew its trams in 1972.

In August 2021 Tampere became the fourth city in Finland with a tram system and the second one to still have trams in service through the opening of the Tampere light rail system.

== 1890–1900: Horse-drawn single-track lines ==
The first proposals for the construction of a tram system in Helsinki were made in the 1870s, but were unsuccessful. Public transport in Helsinki was initiated in 1888 by Helsingin omnibussiosakeyhtiö, using horse-drawn omnibuses. In 1889 Helsingin Omnibussiosakeyhtiö acquired the right to construct tram lines. The next year, the company changed its name in Helsingin raitiotie- ja omnibussiosakeyhtiö (abbreviated HRO). Electric traction was considered as a power source for the new system, but due to lack of funds, and the city council's negative attitude towards electric trams, the decision was made to use horse-drawn trams instead. The new system was built to a track gauge of 1,000 mm (3 ft 3 3/8 in). Test traffic started in December 1890, but the network wasn't officially opened until June 1891. The capacity of the horse tram system soon proved insufficient, but the conversion to electrified trams was postponed until the price of electrification of the network reached lower levels. The network was 8.5 kilometres in length.

The slow pace of the electrification process was a source of conflict within the HRO. In the latter half of the 1890s, Julius Tallberg acquired the right to construct an orbital tram system around the city that would have linked the existing HRO lines and parts of the city not covered by the HRO lines. After negotiations, Tallberg and his associates transferred the construction permit of the orbital line to the HRO in return for a large number of HRO stock shares.

== 1900–1908: Electric single-track lines ==
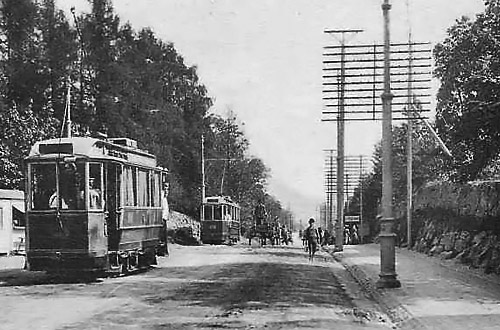
O. L. Kummer built the first electric trams for Helsinki, photographed here on Läntinen Viertotie (present-day Mannerheimintie).

In 1897 HRO received the right to construct an electrified tramway into Helsinki. A call for bids was sent out the following year, and the contract was awarded to the Germany-based O.L. Kummer. By terms on the agreement Kummer had to construct and electrify the new tram system as well as construct the trams used on it, and the company would be responsible for trafficking the new system for up to three years in order to ensure good quality of construction. Electrification of the network was mostly completed in 1900, with one short horse-drawn line lingering until 1901. Kummer had made notable profits from operating the new electrified system, and already in 1901 HRO assumed responsibility for operating the tram network. Following the electrification the number of lines grew into four, but all lines remained single-track. At the same time colours were taken into use as line identifiers.

Within a few years the single-track lines proved insufficient to meet the passenger demand, but the majority of stock owners were unwilling to fund the conversion into double track, while Julius Tallberg and his associates were strongly for the conversion. In 1906 Tallberg and his supporters acquired a stock majority in the HRO, and during the same year the company applied for and received a permission to convert their track network into double track. The contract also specified certain lines that HRO had to operate, as well as certain extensions that had to be built.

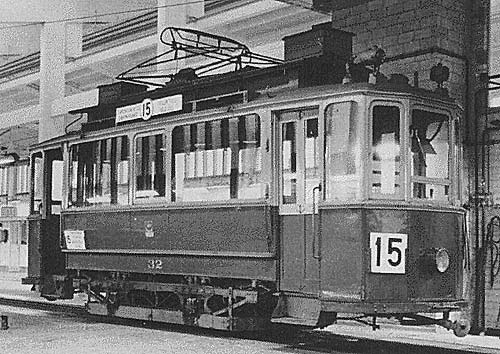
ASEA delivered 67 trams of this type, nicknamed "Pikkuruotsalainen" (English: Little Swede), to HRO between 1908 and 1918. HKL 32 (originally HRO 77) photographed on line 15 in 1954.

== 1908–1945 ==
The contract for converting the tram network into double track was awarded to the Swedish ASEA. Conversion work begun in 1908 and was completed in 1910. From 1908 until 1919 ASEA also supplied the HRO with a total of 78 trams and 70 trailers. In 1909 Brändö Villastad Ab, a company constructing a garden city in the island of Kulosaari (then a part of Helsingin maalaiskunta), and HRO reached an agreement for linking Kulosaari into the Helsinki tram network. The track onwards from the existing HRO line in Sörnäinen was built by Brändö Villastad Ab, who was also responsible for the upkeep of the track, as well as the tram ferry required to cross the Kuorekarinsalmi sea area between Sörnäinen and Kulosaari. Traffic on the new connection was operated by HRO, and service begun in 1910 using existing HRO trams. In 1916 Brändö Spårvägsaktiebolag, which had been created as a separate company to take care of the Kulosaari tram tracks, ordered two new trams of its own. Due to World War I these were not delivered until 1919, and even after they had been delivered HRO remained in charge of trafficking the line. In 1919 a bridge between Kulosaari and the mainland was also completed.

In 1913 the HRO begun expanding its tram network for the first time since 1901, when the tracks were expanded from Hakaniemi to Alppila. During the same year the City of Helsinki acquired the stock majority of HRO, but HRO remained an independent company. The following year the network was also expanded into Taka-Töölö and Hermanni. After this, World War I made it impossible to acquire electric wires and points required for construction.

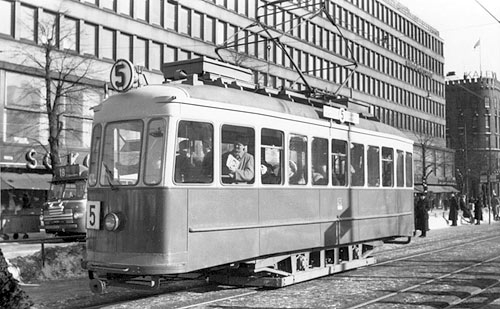
The first trams built in Finland for Helsinki came from Suomen autoteollisuus in 1940–1941. HKL 169 photographed on line 5 in 1957.

The construction of non-HRO owned tram lines continued when in 1914 new tram tracks owned by Aktiebolaget M.G. Stenius were opened to traffic, linking the existing HRO tracks in Töölö to Munkkiniemi and Haaga. As with the Kulosaari tramline, HRO was responsible for trafficking on these lines. In 1926 HRO acquired Aktiebolaget M.G. Stenius and two years later Brändö Spårvägsaktiebolag also passed under HRO ownership. As a result, HRO again became the sole owner and operator of trams in Helsinki. During the same year line numbers and letters were taken into use as line identifiers alongside colours. Lines serving the city were identified with numbers, while suburban lines were identified with letters.

The tram network reached its apex in 1930, when the network covered a larger area than ever before or after (as of 2008), and there were 14 lines in operation. By 1939 61 million tram journeys were being made annually.

== 1945–1975 ==
In the end of 1944 the City of Helsinki had acquired the entirety of HRO, which now became a municipal transport authority under the name Helsingin Kaupungin Liikennelaitos (HKL). This had little to no effect in tram operations. In 1950 secondary line identifier letters were taken into use to distinguish rush hour services from the standard routes (for example 1A, KA. The second letter was a capital letter but in a smaller size from the first). In 1953 the usage of letters as the primary line identifier ended, and the following year line colours were also abandoned.

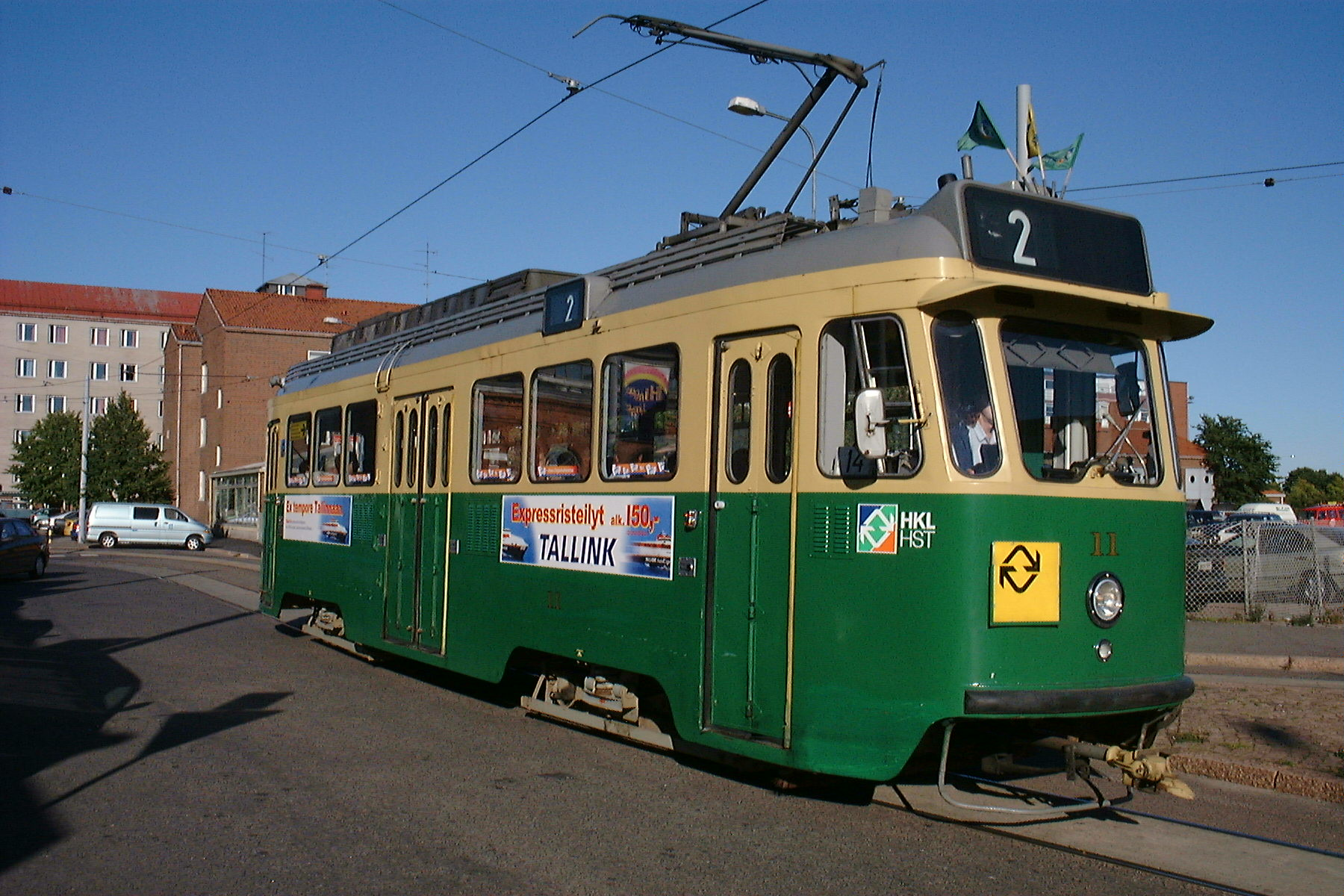
Tram number 11, type HM V, on Line 2 in September 1999.

Trams remained the main public transport system until the 1950s and 1960s, when the city rapidly sprawled and private cars became increasingly common; the new suburbs came to be served mainly by buses and commuter trains. During the 1940s and 1950s plans were drawn for a large light rail network incorporating into the tram system, which would have served major suburban centers; in preparation for this the new Kulosaari bridge (built 1956) featured a reserved space for tram tracks, while the new tram depot was built in Koskela next to a planned northeast light rail line – new tracks had to be built linking the depot to the existing network. As of August 2008, this track along Kustaa Vaasan tie has never been used in normal passenger traffic. During the 1950s a total of 105 Finnish-built double-bogie trams (Karia types HM IV and HM V, Valmet types RM 1 and RM 3) were delivered to the HKL.

During the 1960s all plans for expanding the tram network were put on hold while resources were concentrated on the planning of the metro and additional bus connections. At the same time plans were drawn for the termination of the tram network by the year 2000. In 1969 Helsinki city council made the decision that in the future tramlines would be confined to the inner city, while the metro would serve the suburban areas; the tram system would be terminated, at earliest in the year 2000. This decision required the acquisition of new trams to replace the last two-axle trams, the oldest of which dated from the 1920s. Originally the plan was to acquire fairly new second-hand articulated Duewag GT6 trams from Copenhagen, but the deal fell through and in the end new articulated trams were acquired from Valmet (type Nr I) in 1973–1975. These trams were planned to be the last trams to be acquired for traffic in Helsinki. In a break from tradition the Nr I trams were originally painted in an orange/grey colours scheme instead of the traditional green/yellow, integrating their visual appearance with the Dm 8 and Dm 9 express DMUs of the Finnish State Railways, as well as the Helsinki metro, which was in testing phase at the time.

== 1976–1998 ==
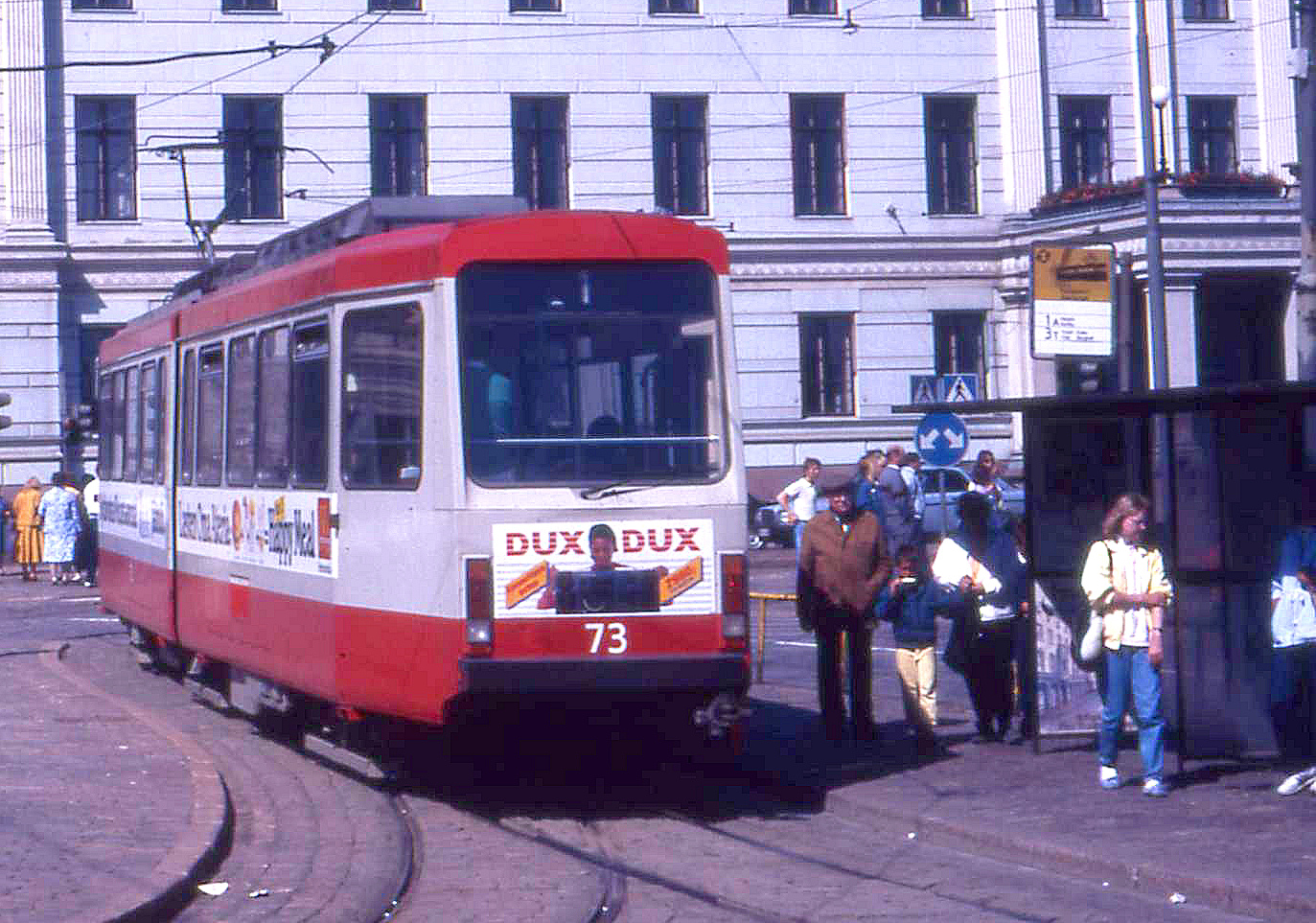
NrI- and NrII-class trams were originally painted in an orange and grey livery, but it proved unpopular and both classes were later repainted in the traditional yellow and green colours. NrII number 73 in Market Square on line 1, 1987.

During the early 1970s the decision to terminate the tram system was reconsidered and eventually reversed. In 1976, the tram network was expanded for the first time since 1955, when the new connection into Itä-Pasila was opened (then line 2, present line 7). Another expansion was opened in 1980, when tracks in Katajanokka were expanded eastward to a new residential area (then line 5, present line 4). In 1981 another group of articulated trams, based on the Nr I type, were ordered from Valmet. Classified as Nr II, these trams were delivered between 1983 and 1987, allowing the withdrawal of the majority of the 1950s-built trams (types HM IV and RM 1 in their entirety), as well as withdrawal of all trailers. In 1985 the tram network was extended to West Pasila (line 7). In the mid-1980s the tram lines were radically reorganised: line 5 was closed down and the routes of lines 2, 3B, 3T, 4, 7A, 7B, 8 and 10 altered to a smaller or larger degree.

The next expansion of the network occurred in 1991, when the connection from Ruskeasuo to Pikku Huopalahti was opened (line 10). In the 1990s wide-ranging plans were made for expansion and improvement of the tram system. These included the Jokeri orbital light rail line connecting Itäkeskus to Leppävaara, extensions of the system to Munkkivuori, Koskela, Viikki, Malmi, Arabianranta and to the harbour areas Jätkäsaari, Munkkisaari and Kalasatama, which were to be freed from shipping activities and to become brownfield sites for residential and office development. In addition to the extensions, the plans included a partially tunneled light rail line linking Erottaja to Pasila via Töölö.

== 1999 onwards ==
Starting in 1999, HKL received deliveries a fleet of low-floor Variotram trams from Adtranz (Bombardier Transportation since 2001). The new generation trams suffered from persistent technical difficulties and frequent break-downs, the entire batch needing to be refitted by the manufacturer in Germany. To cover for the missing trams, the city bought ten second-hand trams from Mannheim, Germany. To help pay for the second-hand trams, HKL was allowed to cover six of the extra trams completely in advertising, a sight rarely seen before on the streets of Helsinki. The purchase of the Bombardier trams was never completed due to the reliability problems. Instead, a deal was reached that required Bombardier to keep a certain minimum number of trams in operation. Bombardier opened its own depot in Helsinki for this purpose in mid-2008.

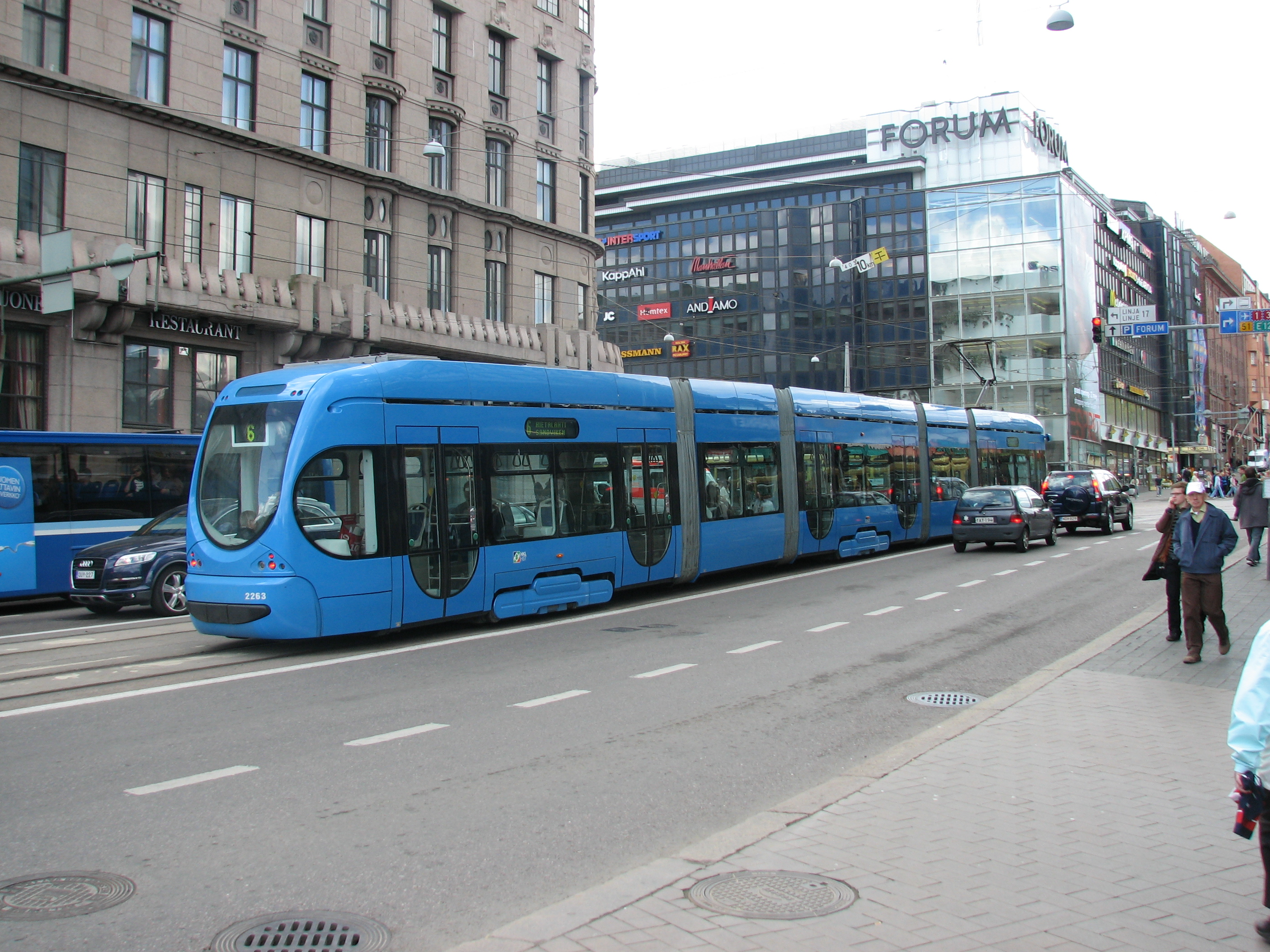
A Crotram TMK 2200 tram in test use on line 6.

The purchase of a new series of 40 low-floor trams was initiated in 2007, and the trams were eventually ordered from the Finnish manufacturer Transtech in December 2010. In preparation for the acquisition, in 2007–2008 one Crotram TMK 2200 type tram built in Croatia was used for test running in Helsinki. Due to the hilly nature of Helsinki's tram network compared to that of Zagreb (for which the TMK 2200 type was designed), the TMK 2200 could be operated only on the relatively flat-terrain lines 6 and 8. The tram performed technically without problems. Passenger feedback was largely negative, but mostly concerned issues – such as the seating arrangements – that would be changed if the type were mass-produced for HKL. During the initial phase of the call for bids opened in late 2008, Alstom, Bombardier Transportation, CAF, Končar (Crotram), ON's Industry, Siemens, Škoda, Transtech and Vossloh (reportedly in collaboration with Heiter Blick) submitted tenders. Of these, Bombardier, CAF, Škoda, Transtech and Vossloh were selected for the second phase of the call for bids. In the end, Bombardier, CAF and Transtech submitted tenders and Transtech's tender was chosen.

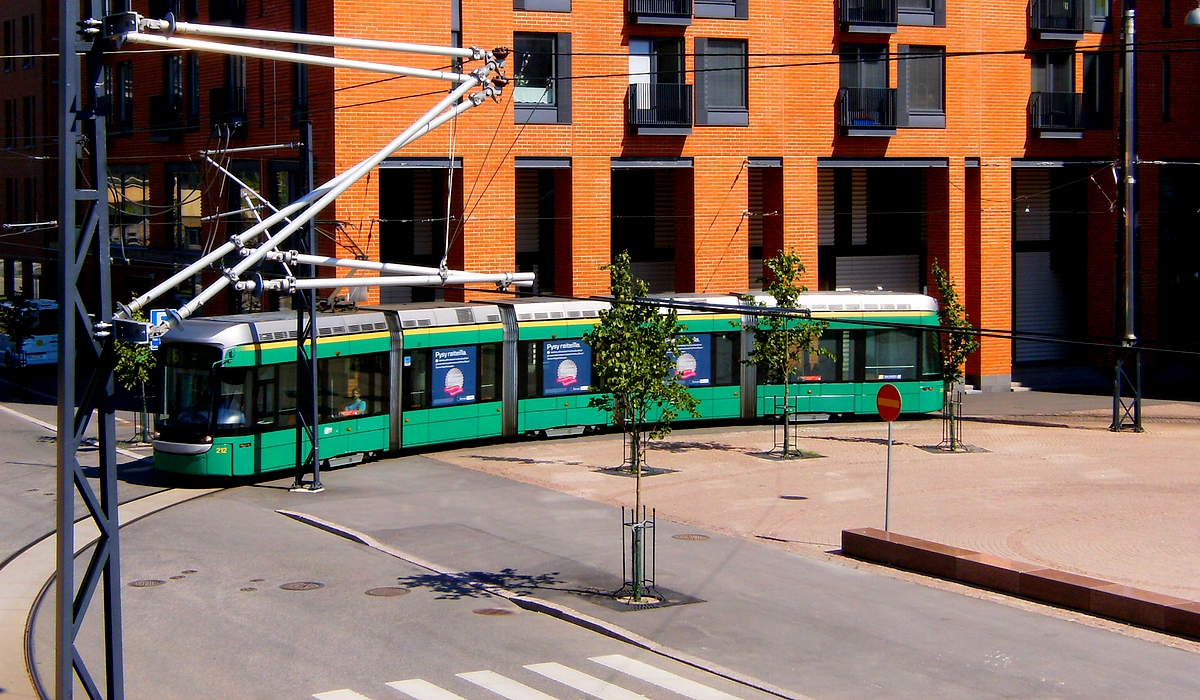
Variotram number 212 on the 2004-built northern terminus of lines 6 & 8 in Arabianranta.

The extension of the network from Arabia into the new residential development area in Arabianranta (lines 6 and 8) was eventually realised and opened in 2004. Line 6 was extended from Arabia to Arabianranta in 2004 and line 8 from St. Paul's church in 2007. The new number 9 line opened on 10 August 2008, connecting Kolmikulma in central Helsinki to East-Pasila and replacing bus line number 17, albeit having been truncated from both ends compared to the initially planned version. This marked the opening of the first new tram line in Helsinki since the (re-)opening of line 2 in 1976.

The first phase of the extension of line 8 to Jätkäsaari was opened on 1 January 2012, and the extension of line 9 to the ferry terminal in Jätkäsaari via Kamppi on 13 August 2012 (see below). The Kalasatama connection (see below) is in planning stages as of 2012, as the construction of buildings in the former harbour has begun.

Various changes to improve the average running speeds in the system were proposed from the late 1990s onwards, and the benefits of these improvements were estimated to outweigh the costs by a large margin. E.g. a detailed plan to speed up line 8 was approved in 2011. Despite this, the improvements have been left unrealised.

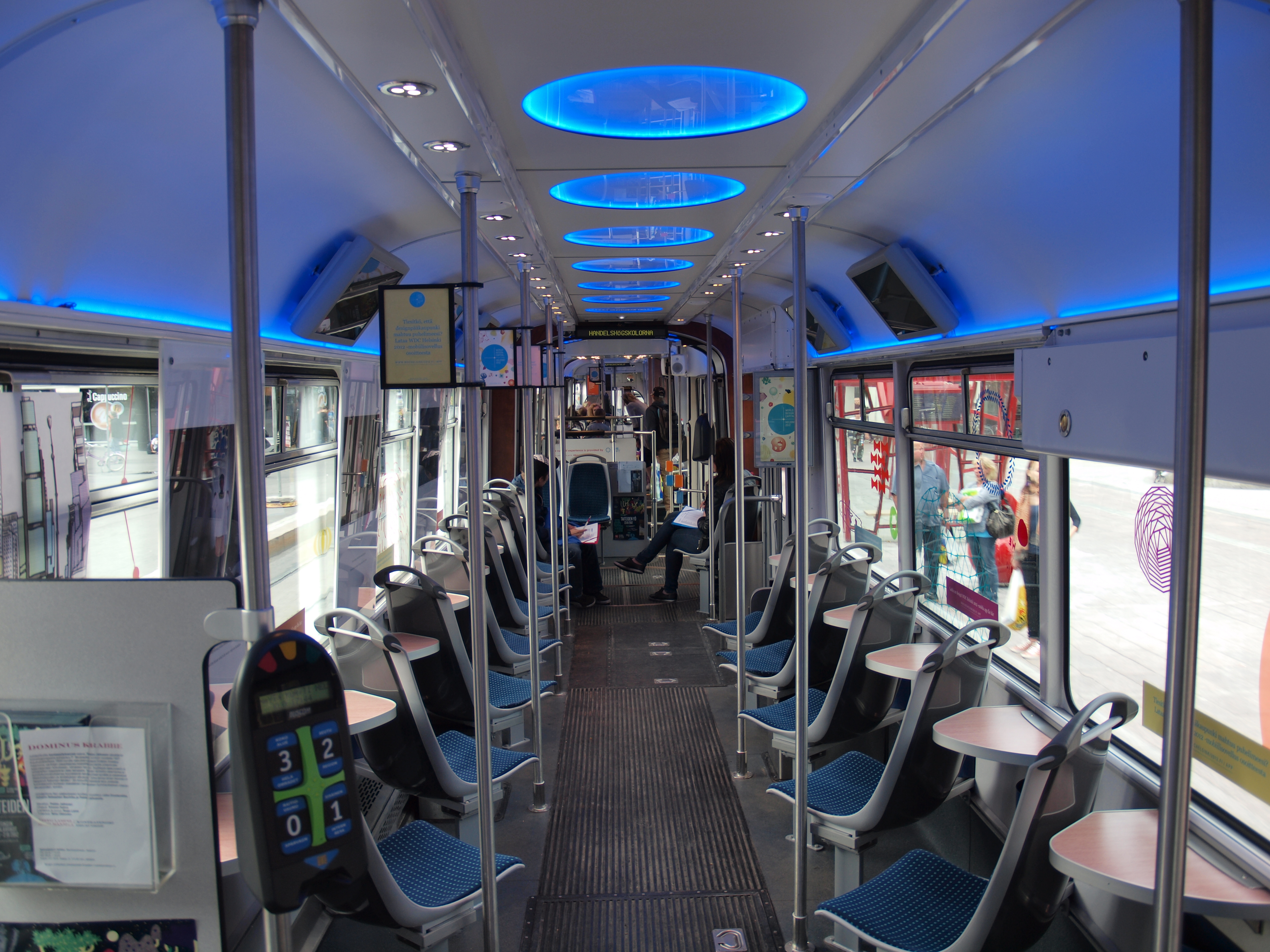
Line 5 Culture Tram from the inside.

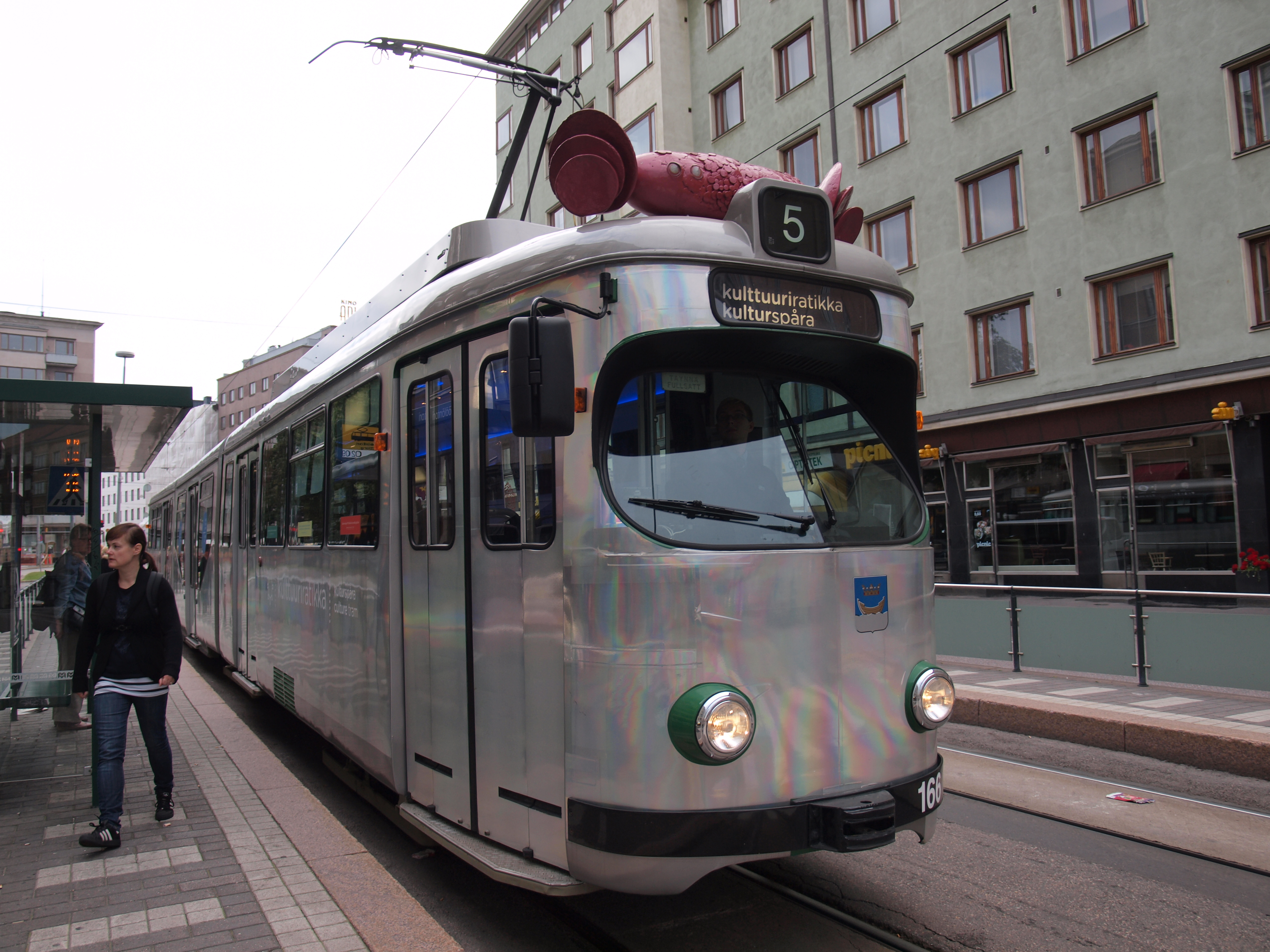
Line 5 Culture Tram from the outside.

From the autumn of 2010 to December 2012, a Culture Tram was operated for limited hours on three days of the week (Wed, Thu, Fri) on the additional line no. 5, whose route ran from Ooppera to Linjat via Rautatientori. The Culture Tram had various art exhibitions and performances on board. Highlights included performances by the singers of the Finnish National Opera and concerts as a part of the Flow Festival. A single eight-axle Duewag tram, originally purchased from Mannheim, Germany, and refurbished specifically for this purpose, served as the Culture Tram. HKL decided to discontinue the regular operation of the Culture Tram by the end of 2012 because the vehicle was deemed too slow in relation to other, frequent tram traffic that shares the same tracks. HKL planned to keep the Culture Tram in the fleet and make it available on charter basis for events that could use the equipment installed in it, such as the audio system.

In August 2013, tram lines 3B and 3T were renumbered to 3 and 2, and at the same time the northern endpoint was labeled as "Nordenskiöldinkatu" instead of "Eläintarha" (engl. Zoo), presumably to avoid confusion with the actual zoo located elsewhere.

== Route history ==
During the history of tram traffic in Helsinki, the routes of various lines have been altered, sometimes radically, and line designations have been changed or swapped between different routes. For instance, the still-existing line 1 (also known as the green line 1900–1926) has run on 22 different routes/route variants since the line was first opened in 1890. The following is a simplified list designed to give a basic impression of what the tram network was like during different eras. Various short-lived route changes and rush hour services are ignored to ease reading.

=== 1890–1901: horse-drawn trams ===
- Töölö–Kaivopuisto. Shortened, then closed down in 1900. Replaced by the Yellow Line in the new electrified tramway.
- Sörnäinen–Lapinlahdenkatu. Shortened in 1900, closed down in 1901. Replaced by the Green and Red Lines in the new electrified tramway.

=== 1900–1909 ===
- Green: Eira–Sörnäinen (1900–1901), Katajanokka–Eira–Sörnäinen (1901–1907, combination of green and blue lines), Kauppatori–Sörnäinen (1907–1910).
- Yellow: Töölö–Kaivopuisto (1900–1908).
- Blue: Töölö/Mariankatu (present-day Presidential Palace)–Hietalahti (1900–1901). Combined into the Green Line 1901–1907. Katajanokka–Hietalahti (1907–1909).
- Red: Ylioppilastalo/Lapinlahti–Kruununhaka (1900–1907), Lapinlahti–Kallio (1907–1909).

=== 1909–1926 ===
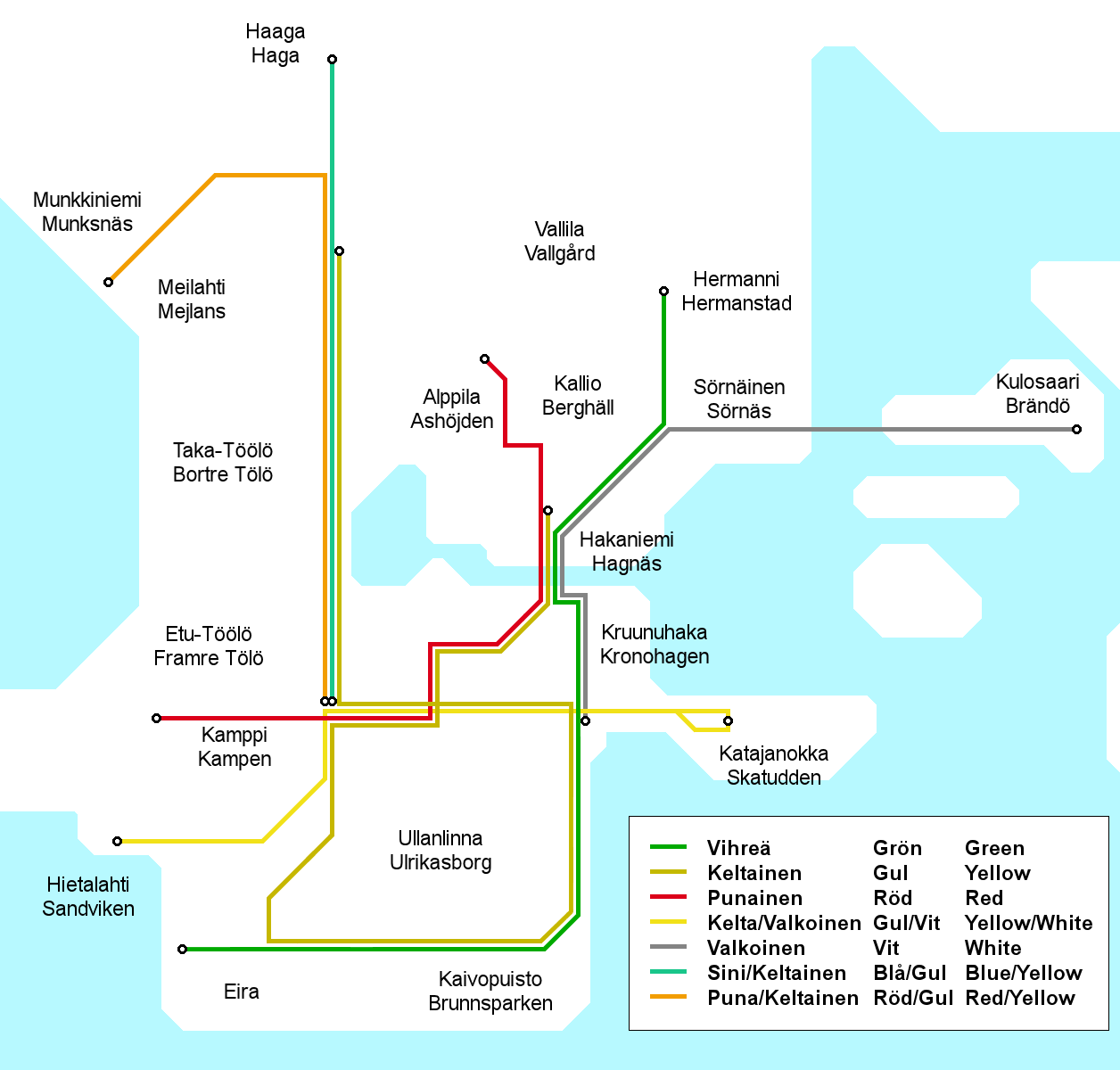
Helsinki tram network in 1920–1922.

In addition to the lines owned by Helsingin Raitiotie- ja Omnibussiosakeyhtiö, one line was owned by Brändö Spårvägsaktiebolag, two lines by Aktiebolaget M.G. Stenius as well as one line owned by Julius Tallberg in Lauttasaari.

- Green: Eira–Hermanni (1910–1931).
- Yellow: Töölö–Kaivopuisto–Rautatientori/Hakaniemi (1908–1922), Eira–Kallio–Töölö–Kauppatori–Eira (figure-of-eight circular, 1922–2009)
- Yellow-white: Katajanokka–Hietalahti (1909–1926), Etu-Töölö–Kirurgi (1924–1926). Two lines operated under the same colours 1924–1926.
- Red: Lapinlahti–Hakaniemi/Alppila (1909–1925).
- White: Sörnäinen/Kauppatori–Kulosaari (1910–1951). Brändö Spårvägsaktiebolag owned the line from Sörnäinen onwards as well as the rolling stock. HRO operated the service. Between 1910 and 1919 the trams were carried across Kuorekarinsalmi sea area by a ferry.
- Blue-Yellow: Ylioppilastalo/Kauppatori–Haaga (1914–1926). Aktiebolaget M.G. Stenius owned the line from Laakso onwards. HRO operated the service using their own trams.
- Red-Yellow: Ylioppilastalo/Kauppatori–Munkkiniemi (1914–1926). Aktiebolaget M.G. Stenius owned the line from Laakso onwards. HRO operated the service using their own trams.
- Lauttalaituri–Katajaharjunniemi (1913–1917). A Julius Tallberg–owned horse tram line operated on the island of Lauttasaari, using former HRO trams.

=== 1926–1953 ===
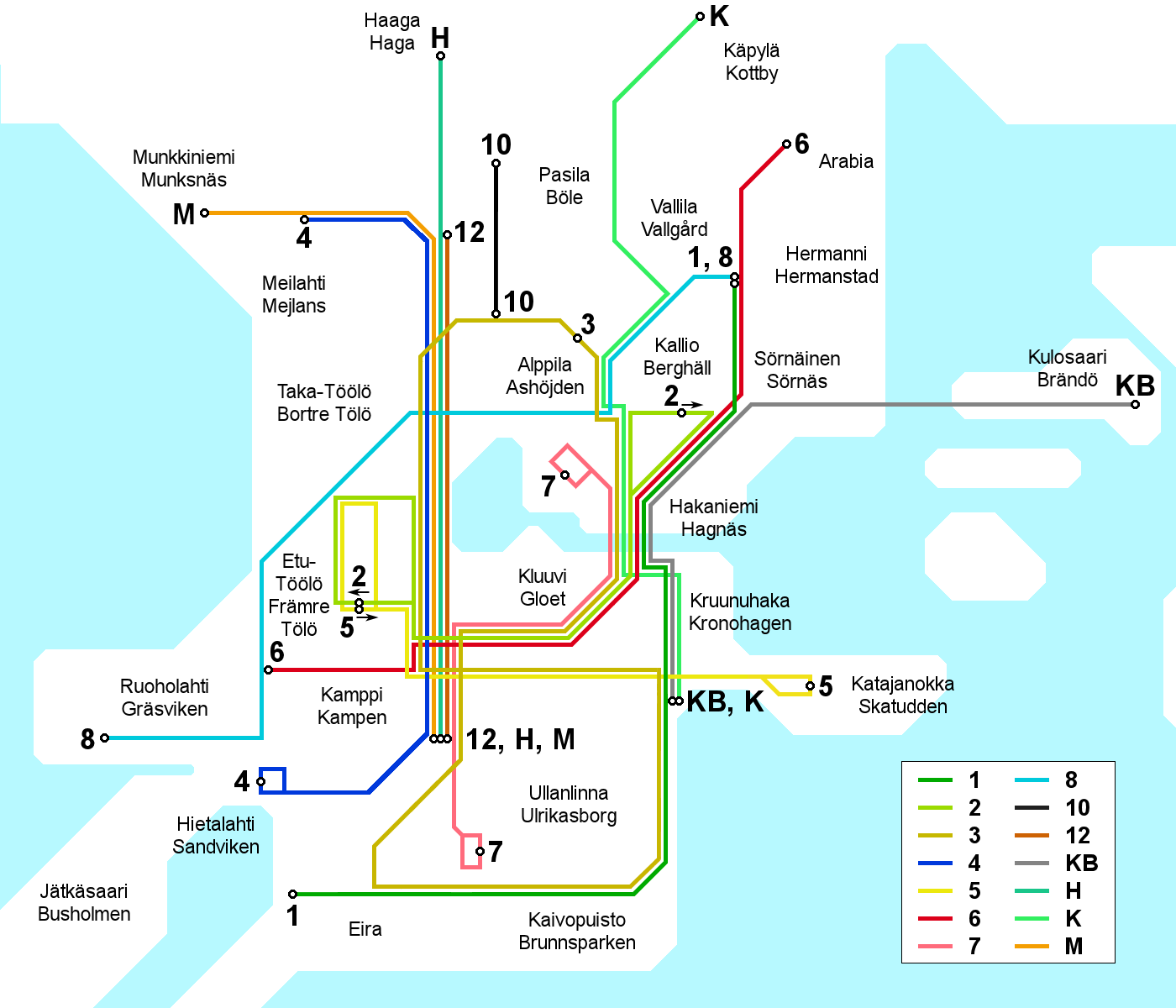
Helsinki tram network in 1946–1949.

In 1926 HRO acquired both Aktiebolaget M.G. Stenius and two years later Brändö Spårvägsaktiebolag, becoming the sole tram operator in Helsinki. During 1926 year numbers and/or letters were taken into use as identifiers of different lines alongside colours. Numbers were used for inner city lines, letters for suburb lines.

- 1 (green): Eira–Hermanni/Arabia (1910–1949), Eira–Vallila–Salmisaari (1949–1953, combination of lines 1 and 8).
- 2 (green-white): Kauppatori–Hermanni (1926–1928). Not operated 1928–1939. Etu-Töölö–Hakaniemi/Harjutori (1939–1951). Not operated 1951–1976.
- 3 (yellow): Eira–Kallio–Töölö–Kauppatori–Eira (1922–2009), figure-of-eight circular.
- 4 (blue): Hietalahti–Töölö/Meilahti (1926–1951), Hietalahti–Munkkiniemi (1951–1959).
- 5 / 5A (yellow-white): Etu-Töölö–Katajanokka (1926–1955; 1929–1939 as 5A).
  - 5B: Etu-Töölö–Kauppatori (1929–1939).
- 6 (red): Lapinlahti–Hakaniemi (1926–1928), Lapinlahti–Hakaniemi–Hermanni (1928–1945), Lapinlahti–Hakaniemi–Arabia (1945–1959).
- 7 (red-white): Kirurgi–Linjat (1926–1949). Not operated 1949–1951. Töölö–Sörnäinen–Rautatientori (circular, 1951–1980).
- 8 (blue-white): Ruoholahti/Salmisaari–Töölö/Vallila (1929–1949). Not operated 1949–1953 (combined into line 1).
- 9 (blue-yellow): Erottaja–Ruskeasuo (1939–1946).
- 10 (white): Eläintarha–Länsi-Pasila (1928–1952).
- 11 (white): Kauppatori–Hermanni (1944).
- 12 (white, later red-yellow): Erottaja–Taka-Töölö (1944–1945), Erottaja–Kuusitie (1945–1949), Kirurgi–Kuusitie (1949–1957).
  - 12S: Arabia–Ruskeasuo (1950–1955), rush hour and night-time service.
- B/KB (white, later green-yellow): Kauppatori–Kulosaari (1913–1951). Tram traffic to Kulosaari terminated in 1951, in part due to the poor condition of the wooden bridge connecting the island to the mainland.
- H (blue-yellow): Erottaja–Haaga (1926–1939), Ruskeasuo–Haaga (1939–1946), again Erottaja–Haaga (1946–1949), Diakonissalaitos–Haaga (1949–1953).
- K (green-red): Vallila/Kauppatori–Käpylä (1925–1953). Combined into line 1 in 1953
- M (red-yellow): Erottaja–Munkkiniemi (1926–1951). Combined into line 4 in 1951.
- W (green-white): Kauppatori–Arabia (1926–1931).

=== 1953–1985 ===
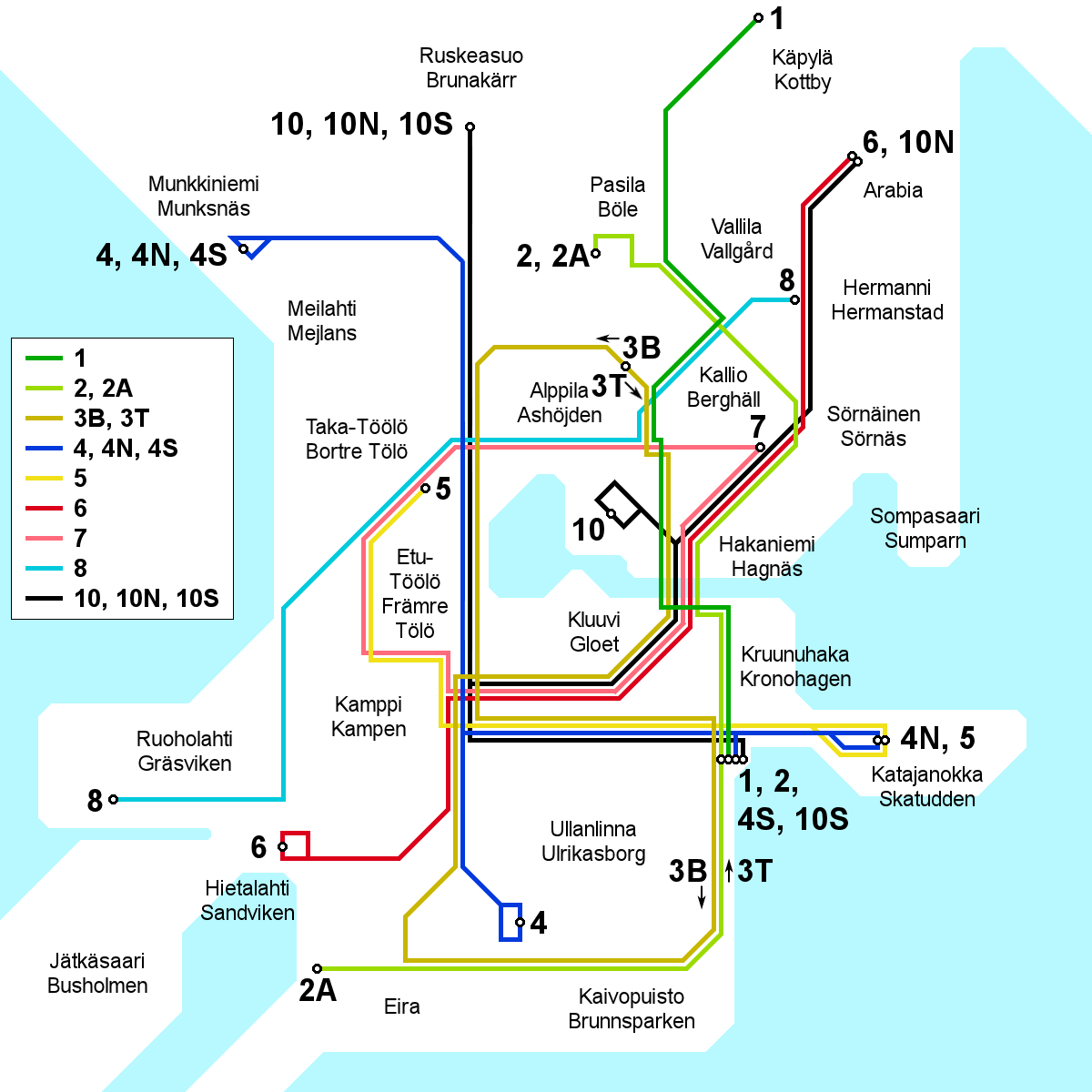
Helsinki tram network in 1976 and 1977.

The usage of letters as the main line identifier ended in 1953. Line colours were abandoned in 1954.

- 1: Eira–Kauppatori–Käpylä (1953–1954), Kauppatori–Käpylä (1954 onwards).
  - 1A: Eira–Käpylä (1954–1976), rush hour service.
- 2: Kauppatori–Itä-Pasila (1976–1985).
  - 2A: Eira–Itä-Pasila (1976–1985), rush hour service.
- 3B, 3T: Eira–Kallio–Töölö–Kauppatori–Eira (1922–2009), figure-of-eight circular.
- 4: Hietalahti–Munkkiniemi (1951–1959), Kirurgi–Munkkiniemi (1959–1985).
  - 4S: Kauppatori–Munkkiniemi (1951–1981), rush-hour service.
  - 4A: Erottaja–Munkkiniemi (1956–1966), rush-hour and night-time service.
  - 4N: Katajanokka–Munkkiniemi (1973–1985), night-time service.
- 5: Katajanokka–Töölö (1955–1985).
- 6: Lapinlahti–Arabia (1945–1959), Hietalahti–Arabia (1959 onwards).
- 7: Töölö–Sörnäinen–Rautatientori (circular, 1951–1980), Hakaniemi–Töölö–Harjutori (1980–1984).
- 8: Salmisaari–Vallila (1953–1984).
  - 8K: Salmisaari–Käpylä (1953–1962), rush-hour service.
- 9: Kauppatori–Vallila (1953–1976).
- 10: Erottaja–Ruskeasuo (1955–1957), Kirurgi–Ruskeasuo (1957–1959), Linjat–Ruskeasuo (1959–1985).
  - 10A: Käpylä–Ruskeasuo (1955–1958), rush-hour service; Arabia–Ruskeasuo (1959–1964), night-time service.
  - 10S: Kauppatori–Ruskeasuo (1955–1977), rush-hour service.
  - 10N: Erottaja–Ruskeasuo (1957–1959), Arabia–Ruskeasuo (1965–1977), night-time services.
- 12: Kirurgi–Kuusitie (1949–1957), Linjat–Kuusitie (1957–1959), Hietalahti–Kuusitie (1959–1962).
  - 12S: Arabia–Ruskeasuo (1950–1955), rush hour and night-time service.
- 15: Linjat – Töölön tulli (1954–1957).

=== 1985 onwards ===
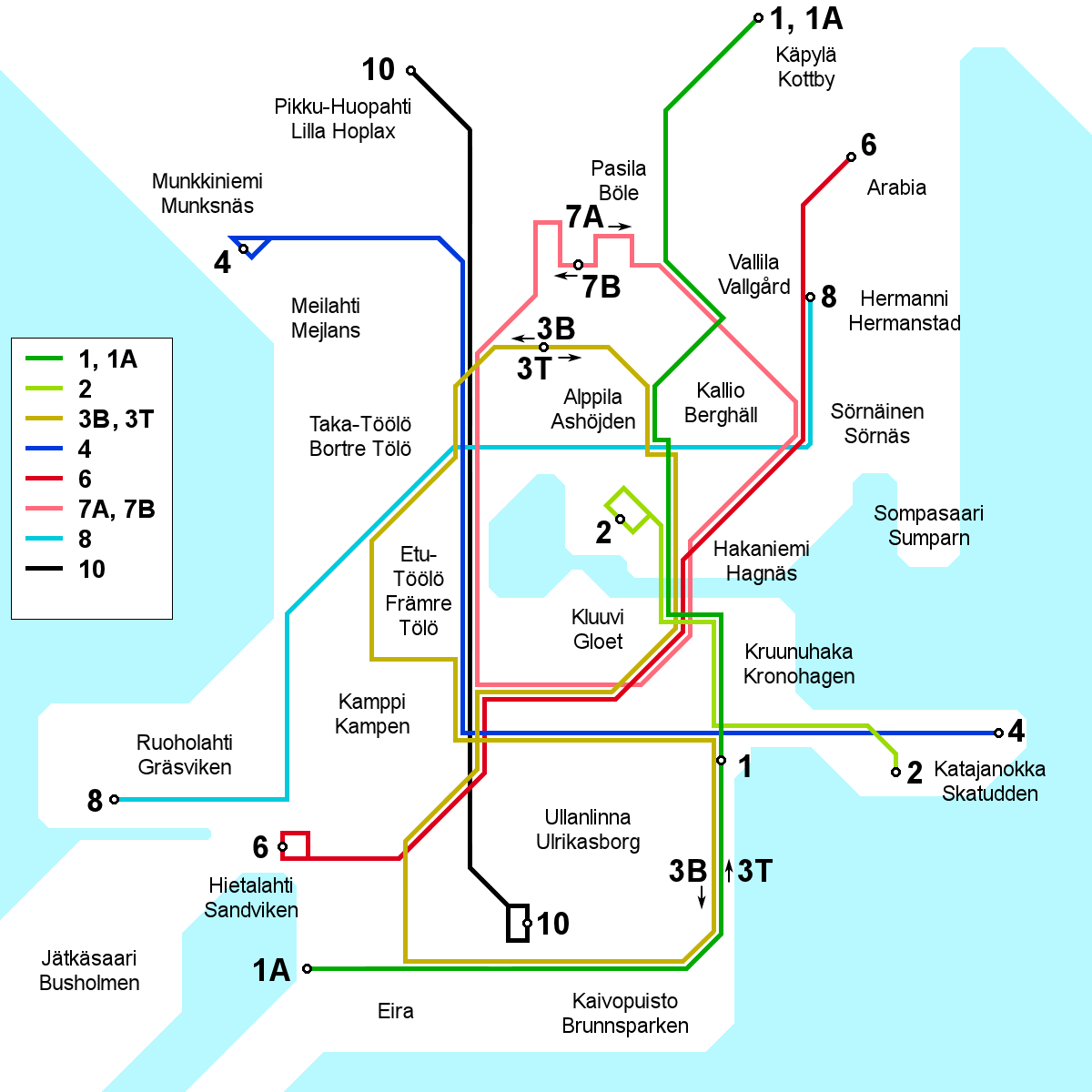
Helsinki tram network in 1992–1995

- 1: Kauppatori–Sörnäinen–Käpylä (1954–1985), Kauppatori–Kallio–Käpylä (1985–2017), Eira–Töölö–Sörnäinen–Käpylä (2017 onwards).
  - 1A: Eira–Käpylä (1985–2017), rush hour service.
- 2: Kauppatori–Linjat (1985–1992), Katajanokka ferry terminal – Linjat (1992–2005),
  Not in use (2005–2013)
  same as 3T (2013–2017) (see below), Olympiaterminaali–Töölö–Eläintarha–Pasila (2017 onwards).
- 3B, 3T: Eira–Kallio–Töölö–Kauppatori–Eira (1922–2009), figure-of-eight circular.
  - 3B: Kaivopuisto–Eira–Kallio–Eläintarha (2009–2017, 2013–2017 as line 3), forms a figure-of-eight circular together with line 3T/2.
  - 3T: Kaivopuisto–Kamppi–Töölö–Elaintarha (2009–2017, 2013–2017 as line 2), forms a figure-of-eight circular together with line 3B/3.
- 3: Olympiaterminaali–Eira–Kallio–Eläintarha–Meilahti (2017 onwards)
- 4: Katajanokka–Munkkiniemi (1985 onwards).
  - 4T: Katajanokka ferry terminal – Munkkiniemi (2004–2016).
- 5: Katajanokka ferry terminal – Central railway station (2016 onwards)
- 6: Hietalahti–Arabia (1959–2021), Eiranranta–Hietalahti–Arabia (2021 onwards).
- 7A, 7B: Pasila–Töölö–Rautatientori/Senaatintori–Sörnäinen–Pasila (1985–2017), circular.
- 7: West Harbour ferry terminal – Kruununhaka–Sörnäinen–Pasila (2017 onwards)
- 8: Salmisaari–Sörnäinen–Vallila (1984–2007), Salmisaari–Sörnäinen–Vallila–Arabia (2007–2011), Saukonpaasi–Sörnäinen–Vallila–Arabia (2012 onwards).
- 9: Kolmikulma–Kallio–Itä-Pasila (2008–2012), West Harbour ferry terminal – Kallio – Itä-Pasila (13 August 2012 – 2017), Saukonpaasi–Kallio–Pasila (2017–2021), West Harbour ferry terminal – Saukonpaasi–Kallio–Pasila (2021 onwards)
- 10: Kirurgi–Ruskeasuo (1985–1990), Kirurgi–Pikku-Huopalahti (1991 onwards).
- Museum line (unnumbered): Kauppatori–Kruunuhaka–Rautatientori–Kauppatori (2009 onwards), circular.
- PUB: Rautatientori–Kallio–Töölö–Kauppatori–Rautatientori (1995 onwards), circular, restaurant line.
- Sightseeing: Rautatientori–Eira–Töölö–Kallio–Rautatientori (2010 onwards), circular, sightseeing line.

== Bibliography ==
Helsinki City Transport

- Herranen, Timo (1988). Hevosomnibusseista metroon - Sata vuotta Helsingin joukkoliikennettä (in Finnish). Helsingin kaupungin liikennelaitos. ISBN 951-771-733-4.
- "Historiallinen lisäys Helsingin rataverkkoon" (in Finnish). 2008-08-08. Archived from the original on 2008-09-13.
- "HKL:n uusien ratikoiden tarjouskilpailu etenee" (in Finnish). 2009-06-26. Archived from the original on 2009-07-09.
- "HKL-Raitioliikenne" (in Finnish). Archived from the original on 2011-07-20.
- "Johdinautoliikenteen toteutettavuusselvitys" (PDF) (in Finnish). 2009. Archived from the original (PDF) on 2011-06-11.
- "Jätkäsaaren joukkoliikennevaihtoehdot" (in Finnish). 2008-06-23. Archived from the original on November 22, 2010.
- "Kroatialainen raitiovaunu matkustajaliikenteeseen" (in Finnish). 2008-01-18. Archived from the original on June 11, 2011.
- "Linjastovaihtoehdot 0, 1, 2 ja 3" (PDF) (in Finnish). Archived from the original (PDF) on 2011-06-11.
- "Raide-Jokeria suunnitellaan" (in Finnish). 2008-10-15. Archived from the original on 2008-10-23.
- "HLJ 2011 draft" (PDF) (in Finnish). 2010-10-26. Archived from the original (PDF) on 2011-01-02.
- "Helsingin uudet raitiovaunut toimittaa Transtech" (in Finnish). HKL. 2010-12-02. Archived from the original on 2010-12-13.

Finnish Tramway Society

- "Helsingin raitiotielinjat 3" (in Finnish). pp. Linja 1 Linja 2 Linja 3 Linja 4 Linja 5 Linja 6 Linja 7 Linja 8 Linja 9 Linja 10 Linja 11 Linja 12 Linja 15 Linja B / KB Linja H Linja K Linja M Linja W Spårakoff Linja "Sightseeing" Museolinja. Archived from the original on 2015-09-24.
- "6-axle three-truck five-sectioned low-floor articulated tram HKL (ZET) 2263" (in Finnish and English).
- "Helsingin raitiotielinjat 1: Hevosraitiotielinjat 1890 - 1901" (in Finnish). Archived from the original on 2008-07-24.
- "Helsingin raitiotielinjat 2: Yksiraiteiset sähköraitiotielinjat 1900 - 1909" (in Finnish). Archived from the original on 2008-05-18.
- Niskanen, Toivo (1995). "Kulosaaren Raitiotie". Raitio (in Finnish) (1/1995). Archived from the original on 2008-07-24.
- "Helsingin raitiotiet / Tramways of Helsinki" (in Finnish and English).
- "Tramways of Helsinki: Other Companies" (in Finnish and English). Archived from the original on 2008-07-24.
- Virta, E.; Rauhala, J. "Helsingin raitioteiden linjavärit" (in Finnish). Archived from the original on 2012-03-12.
- Price, Walter (2002-10-14). "Tramways of Helsinki".
- "Metro Helsinki, historiikkia / Metro Helsinki, historical survey" (in Finnish and English). 2008-07-19. Archived from the original on 2017-09-14.
- "Metrovaunut / Metro EMUs" (in Finnish and English). 2008-07-19. Archived from the original on 2010-01-08.
- Rauhala, Jorma. "Lauttasaaren hevosraitiotie" (in Finnish). Archived from the original on 2008-05-18.
- "Helsinki: Current plans on developing the tram network" (in Finnish and English). Archived from the original on 2008-06-07.
- "Tram depots" (in Finnish and English). pp. Töölö Vallila Koskela.
- "Tram repair shop: Bombardier Transportation" (in Finnish). Archived from the original on 2008-10-02.

Helsingin Sanomat

- Punkka-Hänninen, Päivi (2009-02-25). "Jokeri-linja halutaan raiteille jo 2016" (in Finnish).
- Salonen, Juha (2007-05-17). "Vikojen vaivaamat raitiovaunut pysyvät Helsingin liikenteessä" (in Finnish).
- Seuri, Ville (2007-12-18). "Ongelmalliset matalalattiavaunut" (in Finnish).
- Seuri, Ville (2007-12-19). "Kroaattivaunun ensikyyti Helsingin raiteilla sujui tiukasti katua hipoen" (in Finnish).
- "Croatian-made tram criticised as "cramped and noisy"". 2008-03-28.
- Westerback, Christian (2008-05-08). "1960-luvun mannheimilaiset paikkaavat raitiovaunutarvetta" (in Finnish).
- Oksanen, Kimmo (2008-08-19). "Raitiolinja 9:ää aiotaan yhä jatkaa Etelä-Helsinkiin" (in Finnish).
- Salonen, Juha; Karumo, Markku (2009-04-22). "Trollikka voi tulevaisuudessa kuljettaa matkustajia Helsingissä" (in Finnish).

Miscellaneous

- Alku, Antero; Peltola, Janne; Wahlbeck, Jonas (2008-12-19). "Esisuunnitelma raitiolinjasta Itä-Pasila – Arabia" (PDF) (in Finnish). Archived from the original (PDF) on 2009-03-18.
- Alku, Antero (2008-08-13). "Helsingin kantakaupungin raitioteiden laajennukset". www.kaupunkiliikenne.net (in Finnish).
- Alku, Antero (2008-07-31). "Helsingin raideliikenteen historiaa". www.kaupunkiliikenne.net (in Finnish).
- Alku, Antero (2008-06-27). "Helsinki: Laajasalon raitiotie". www.kaupunkiliikenne.net (in Finnish).
- Alku, Antero (2008-06-21). "Jokerilinja". www.kaupunkiliikenne.net (in Finnish).
- Alku, Antero (2006-01-12). "Joukkoliikenteen yhteydet Kumpulan kampukselle". www.kaupunkiliikenne.net (in Finnish).
- Alku, Antero (2004-04-12). "Metron ja pikaraitiotien yhteensovittaminen". www.kaupunkiliikenne.net (in Finnish).
- Alku, Antero (2002). Raitiovaunu tulee taas (in Finnish). Jyväskylä: Kustantaja Laaksonen. pp. 20–21. ISBN 951-98475-3-7.
- Haltia-Holmberg, Mirva (2008-08-21). "Enimmäkseen upeita lautakunnan kokouskuulumisia 21.8.2008". Haltian vaaliyö (in Finnish).
- Haltia-Holmberg, Mirva (2008-09-15). "Ykkönen, riesasta ongelmanratkaisijaksi". Haltian vaaliyö (in Finnish).
- Haltia-Holmberg, Mirva (2008-09-28). "Messuraportti: Innotrans 2008". Haltian vaaliyö (in Finnish).
- Haltia-Holmberg, Mirva (2008-10-14). "Kokouskuulumiset: joukkoliikennelautakunta 14.10.2008". Haltian vaaliyö (in Finnish).
- Haltia-Holmberg, Mirva (11 December 2008). "Kokouskuulumiset: joukkoliikennelautakunta 11.12.2208". Haltian vaaliyö (in Finnish).
- Haltia-Holmberg, Mirva (2009-04-30). "HKL:n johtokunnan kokouskuulumiset 30.4.2009". Haltian kiskotyö (in Finnish).
- "Hankintailmoitus, erityisalat: Helsingin kaupunki: Raitiovaunujen hankinta". Hilma: Julkiset hankkinat. Helsingih kaupunki. 23 December 2008. Archived from the original on 22 January 2009.
- "Helsinki Public Transport Signal Priority and Passenger Information (HeLMi)". Public Transport Telematics. Helsinki Urban Traffic Control Centre. Archived from the original on 2008-06-11.
- Jompero, Sanna (2008-10-09). "Maanalaista varikkoa suunnitellaan Vallilaan" (in Finnish). Vartti.fi. Archived from the original on 2008-10-10.
- "Jätkäsaaren joukkoliikenteen järjestäminen" (in Finnish). Kaupunkisuunnittelulautakunta. 2007-06-08. Archived from the original on 2007-09-05.
- "Jätkäsaaren joukkoliikenne 2015/2025" (PDF) (in Finnish). Joukkoliikennelautakunta. 11 December 2008.
- Karjalainen, Marketta (2009-02-20). "Helsingin liitosalue saattaa jäädä kokonaan ilman metroa". Vantaan Sanomat (in Finnish). Archived from the original on 2011-07-20.
- "Laajasalon raidevaihtoehtojen järjestelmätarkastelu 2008" (PDF) (in Finnish). Helsingin kaupunkisuunnitteluvirasto. 2008-10-02.
- "Lausunto valtuustoaloitteesta (Wallden-Paulig) koskien eteläisen Helsingin joukkoliikenneyhteyden palauttamista" (in Finnish). Joukkoliikennelautakunta. 2008-08-08.
- Marttinen, Vesa (2009-03-07). "Joukkoliikennekadun tilalle tarjotaan kampusratikkaa" (in Finnish). Helsingin Uutiset. p. 4.
- "Museoliikennettä ratikoilla!" (in Finnish). Oy Stadin Ratikat Ab.
- Laaksonen, Kustantaja; Nummelin, Markku (2001). Raitiotiet / Tramways (in Finnish and English). Jyväskylä: Kustantaja Laaksonen. ISBN 951-98475-2-9.
- "Pikaraitiotietä kaavaillaan Porvooseen asti" (in Finnish). YLE. 2009-06-25. Archived from the original on 2010-08-18.
- "Päätöstiedote" (in Finnish). Joukkoliikennelautakunta. 2008-06-17. Archived from the original (DOC) on 2011-06-11.
- "Päätöstiedote 2.4.2009" (in Finnish). Kaupunkisuunnittelulautakunta. 2009-04-02.
- "Päätöstiedote nr 20" (in Finnish). Helsingin kaupunginvaltuusto. 12 November 2008. Archived from the original on 20 May 2009.
- "Raide-Jokerin alustava yleissuunnitelma, suunnittelun ja mitoituksen lähtökohdat" (in Finnish). Kaupunkisuunnittelulautakunta. 2005-12-15. Archived from the original on 2007-07-02.
- "RATIKKA 2015 – vaihtoehdot" (PDF) (in Finnish). Kaupunkisuunnittelulautakunta. Archived from the original (PDF) on 2009-03-18.
- Sirkiä, Hanna (October 2003). Hyvästi ny sitt – Raitsikat: Turun raitiovaunuliikenteen lakkautus 1961-1972 (PDF) (in Finnish). Turku: University of Turku. pp. 10–12. Archived from the original (PDF) on 2007-09-27.
- "Vallilan maanalaisen raitiovaunuvarikon asemakaavan muutos: osallistumis- ja arviointisuunnitelma" (PDF) (in Finnish). Kaupunkisuunnitteluvirasto. 2008-09-26.
- "Valtuutetut penäävät ysilinjalle muutoksia". Ylen aikaisen uutiset (in Finnish). YLE. 2008-10-10. Archived from the original on 2008-10-12.
- "Sijaintikartta: Vallilan maanalainen raitiovaunuvarikko" (PDF) (in Finnish). Kaupunkisuunnitteluvirasto. 2008-09-29. Archived from the original (PDF) on 2009-03-18.
- "Raide-Jokeri Alustava yleissuunnitelma 2009" (PDF) (in Finnish). The City of Helsinki, The City of Espoo, Helsinki Metropolitan Area Council, Ministry of Transport and Communications. May 2009. Archived from the original (PDF) on 2011-07-21.
- "Matalalattiainen raitiovaunu" (in Finnish). Transtech Oy.
- "Kulttuuriratikka poistuu linjaliikenteestä tilausajoon" (in Finnish). HSL (Helsinki Region Transport). 2012-12-14. Archived from the original on 2013-03-05.
