= NRV =

NRV may refer to:

- Net realizable value of an asset
- Norddeutscher Regatta Verein, a German yacht club
- Not Really Vanished, computer compression algorithm in UPX
- Nutrient Reference Value, also known as Dietary Reference Intake
- Valmet Nr I and Valmet Nr II Helsinki trams
- Non Return Valve (check Valve)
- The New River Valley region in Southwest Virginia in the United States
