= Trams in Helsinki =

Overview of the tram network in Helsinki, Finland

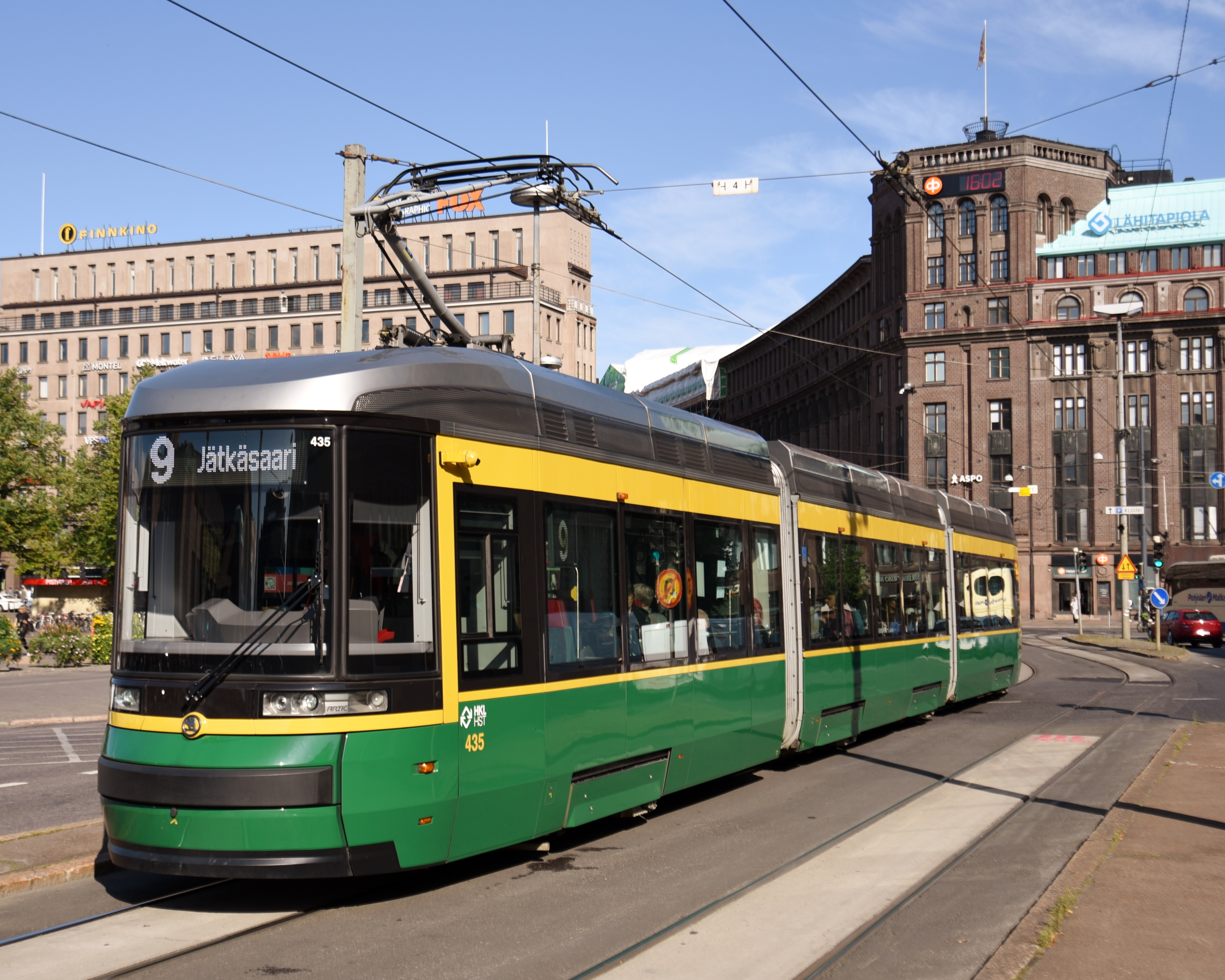
- Artic tram on Kaivokatu in 2019

Overview
- Owner: City of Helsinki
- Area served: Helsinki, Espoo
- Locale: Uusimaa
- Transit type: Tram
- Line number: 1-13, 15
- Number of stops: 344
- Annual ridership: 56.8 million

Operation
- Began operation: 1891
- Operator: Metropolitan Area Transport
- Character: At-grade street running with some segregated right-of-ways
- Number of vehicles: 137

Technical
- System length: Line length: 110.5 km (68.7 mi) (October 2023)
- No. of tracks: 2
- Track gauge: 1,000 mm (3 ft 3 3/8 in)
- Minimum radius of curvature: 15 m (49.2 ft)
- Electrification: 750 V DC
- Top speed: 70 km/h (43 mph)

A tram running on the Helsinki tram network, 2015

Trams in Helsinki form part of the public transport system organised by Helsinki Regional Transport Authority and operated by Metropolitan Area Transport (Finnish: Pääkaupunkiseudun Kaupunkiliikenne Oy, Swedish: Huvudstadsregionens Stadstrafik Ab) in Finland's capital city of Helsinki. The trams are the main means of transport in the city center, and 56.8 million trips were made on the system in 2019. In addition to the older tram network, there is a single light rail line that was opened in October 2023. Although technically compatible with the tram network, the light rail line is separate from the city center tram network.

== Current system ==
=== Lines ===
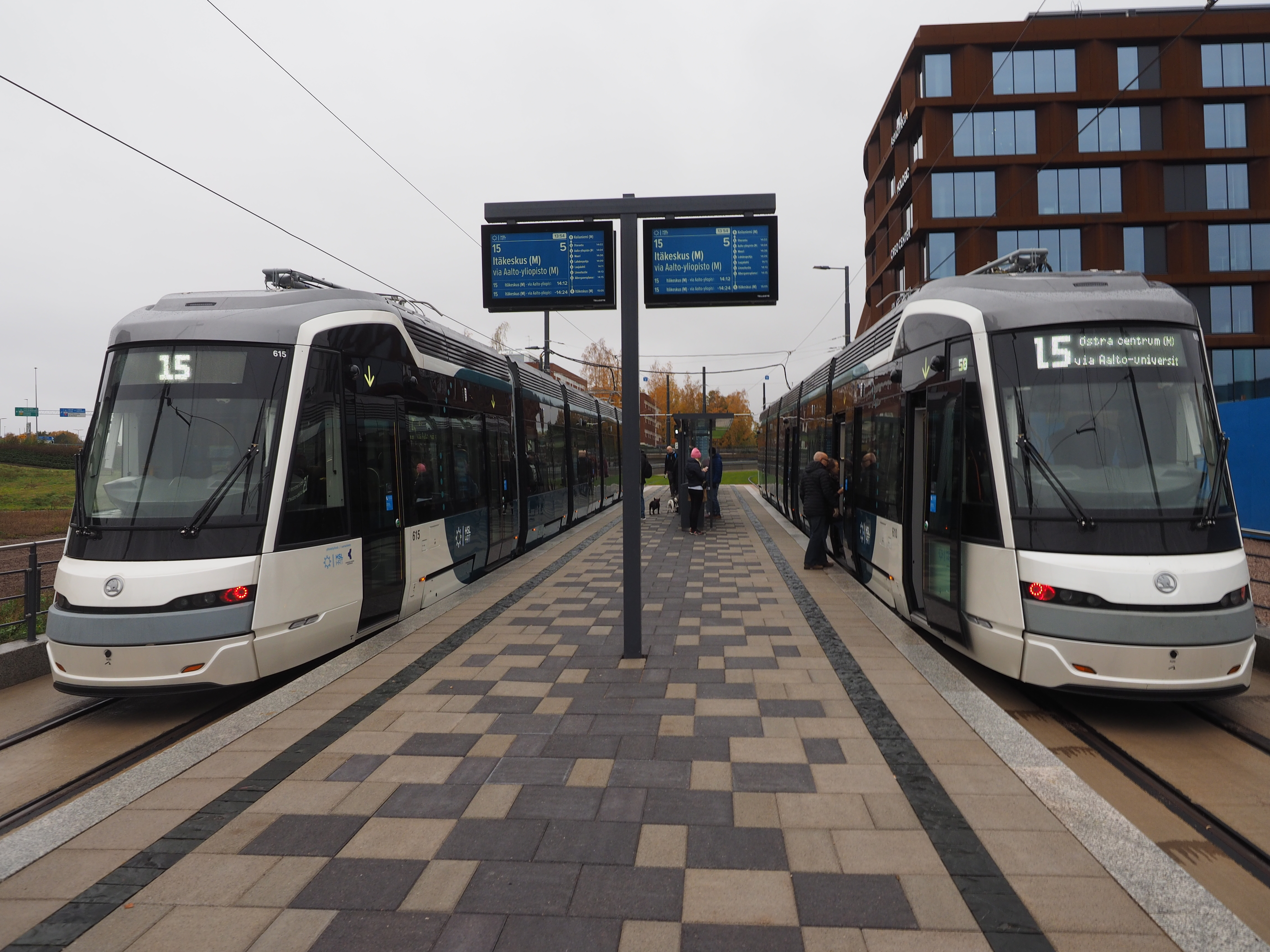
Light rail line 15 connects Keilaniemi in Espoo and Itäkeskus in Helsinki.

As of 7 November 2026, the network consists of 13 individually numbered city center tram lines and one numbered light rail line. Lines 1 and 8 operate on a slightly different route during weekends when they go to the West Harbour terminal, indicated with a "T" suffix on the line number. Lines 3N and 9N are operated on a slightly modified line 3 and 9 route respectively during night time. The light rail line 15 is currently the only tram line in Helsinki to also reach the neighbouring city of Espoo, all other lines travel inside Helsinki only.

Helsinki tram lines as of 7 November 2026
Line	Type	From	Via	To	Maps
1 (Note: Weekdays only.)	City center	Eira	Lasipalatsi, Töölö, Sörnäinen	Käpylä	uKBHFa uBHF uINT uBS2+l uBS2+r uBHF(L)g uBHF(R)f uKBHFe udCONTf
1T (Note: Weekends only.)	City center	West Harbour	Lasipalatsi, Töölö, Sörnäinen	Käpylä	uKBHFa uBHF uINT uBS2+l uBS2+r uBHF(L)g uBHF(R)f uKBHFe udCONTf
2 (Note: Trams on lines 2 and 3 do not turn around at their shared terminus at the Olympia Terminal, but change their line signs.)	City center	Olympia Terminal	Market Square, Central Railway Station, Kamppi, Töölö	Pasila	uSTR+l uSTR+r uBHF(R)f uSTR uABZg+l uBHFr(L)g uINT TRAIN2 uBHF udCONTf
3	City center	Olympia Terminal	Eira, Central Railway Station, Hakaniemi	Pikku Huopalahti	uKBHFa uBHF uBHF(L)g uINT TRAIN2 udCONTf
3N (Note: Operates during night time only.)	City center	Olympia Terminal	Eira, Central Railway Station, Hakaniemi	Meilahti	uKBHFa uBHF uBHF(L)g uINT TRAIN2 udCONTf
4	City center	Katajanokka	Alppila	Munkkiniemi	uKBHFa uBHF uINT uBHF(R)f uKBHFe
5 (Note: Ferry arrival and departure times only.)	City center	Katajanokka ferry terminal		Central Railway Station	uSTR+l uSTR+r uSTR uBHF(R)f TRAIN2 uBHF(L)g uKRWg+l uKRWr uBHF uKBHFe
6	City center	Eiranranta	Central Railway Station, Sörnäinen	Arabia	uKBHFa uBHF uINT uBHF(L)g TRAIN2 uKBHFe
7 (Note: Trams on lines 7 and 9 do not turn around at their shared terminus at the West terminal, but change their line signs.)	City center	West Harbour	Central Railway Station, Kruununhaka, Sörnäinen, Pasila	Meilahti Hospital	uKBHFa uBHF uINT TRAIN2 uBHF(L)g udCONTf
8	City center	Jätkäsaari	Ruoholahti, Töölö, Sörnäinen	Arabia	uKBHFa uBHF uINT uBS2+l uBS2+r uKBHFe udCONTf
8T	City center	West Harbour	Ruoholahti, Töölö, Sörnäinen	Arabia	uKBHFa uBHF uINT uBS2+l uBS2+r uKBHFe udCONTf
9	City center	West Harbour	Kamppi, Central Railway Station, Kallio, Pasila	Ilmala	uKINTa TRAIN2 uBHF uINT uBHF(R)f uBHF(L)g uBS2+l uBS2+r uKBHFe udCONTf
9N (Note: Operates on Friday and Saturday nights only.)	City center	Jätkäsaari	Kamppi, Central Railway Station, Kallio, Pasila	Ilmala	uKINTa TRAIN2 uBHF uINT uBHF(R)f uBHF(L)g uBS2+l uBS2+r uKBHFe udCONTf
10	City center	Ullanlinna	Lasipalatsi	Vallila	uKBHFa uBHF uINT uKBHFe
11	City center	Länsi-Pasila	Pasila, Kalasatama, Sompasaari	Kruunuvuorenranta	ubvvBHF(L)gqWSLa uBHF(R)f uSTR uABZg+l uBHFr(L)g uINT TRAIN2 uBHF uKBHFe
12	City center	Central Railway Station	Nihti	Yliskylä	uKINTa TRAIN2 uBHF uINT uKBHFe
13	City center	Länsi-Pasila	Pasila, Kalasatama	Nihti	ubvvBHF(L)gqWSLa uBHF(R)f uSTR uABZg+l uBHFr(L)g uINT TRAIN2 uBHF uKBHFe
15	Light rail	Keilaniemi	Otaniemi, Laajalahti, Leppävaara, Huopalahti, Oulunkylä, Viikki	Itäkeskus	leer udKINTa uHST udINT ueSTR+GRZq udKINTe lCONTg@F orange udKHSTa-L; lvINT tdINT-R orange udÜST tdSTR orange udHST udÜSTr udHST-L; lvINT c; udHST tSTRl orange tdCONTfq orange cRP2q uSKRZ-G2o STR+l dCONTfq umvINT udÜSTl dSTR cRP4q umvSKRZ-G4u umvHST-STR dHST udTUNNEL1 ABZg+l STRc2 STR3+1h; uINT SHI4c4 dCONT1- uHST; STRc4 uSKRZ-G4u dCONT2- ud-KRZ2+4u; d-STR2+4 dSTRc3 udINT; lvINT; dSTRc1 dSTR+4 STRl uÜSTr uABZgl+l uCONTfq cd; CONT4+f orange d; ABZgl+l orange uSTRu; KSTRaq orange CONTfq orange c; PORTALf dSTR orange tdINT orange; lvINT udKHSTe tABZgl orange CONTf@Fq orange; PORTALr tCONTf orange

In addition, the SpåraKoff pub tram has operated during the summer months since 1995.

=== Network ===
The tram network is built almost exclusively on the streets of Helsinki, making it a traditional tram system rather than light rail. The track gauge is one metre. The network consists almost entirely of double track rail. In some parts the tracks are separated from other road traffic; elsewhere they share road space with cars and buses.

The trams are powered with electricity conveyed by 750 V DC overhead wires, after the voltage was raised from 600 V in 2025. Trams have their own traffic lights, distinguished from normal lights in that they are based on symbols of single colour: an upward-pointing arrow signifies "go", a horizontal line "prepare to go/stop" and the letter S "stop". The traffic lights are synchronised to allow tram and bus traffic to flow relatively smoothly. This system is called HeLMi (Helsinki Public Transport Signal Priority and Passenger Information). Line 15 uses a different system based on inductive loops and requests from the trams themselves. Line 15's traffic lights also have a fourth aspect: a circle above the letter S, which signifies that the traffic light has acknowledged receipt of a request for the tram. On the inner-city network, a small flashing LED is provided with the S aspect.

=== Rolling stock ===
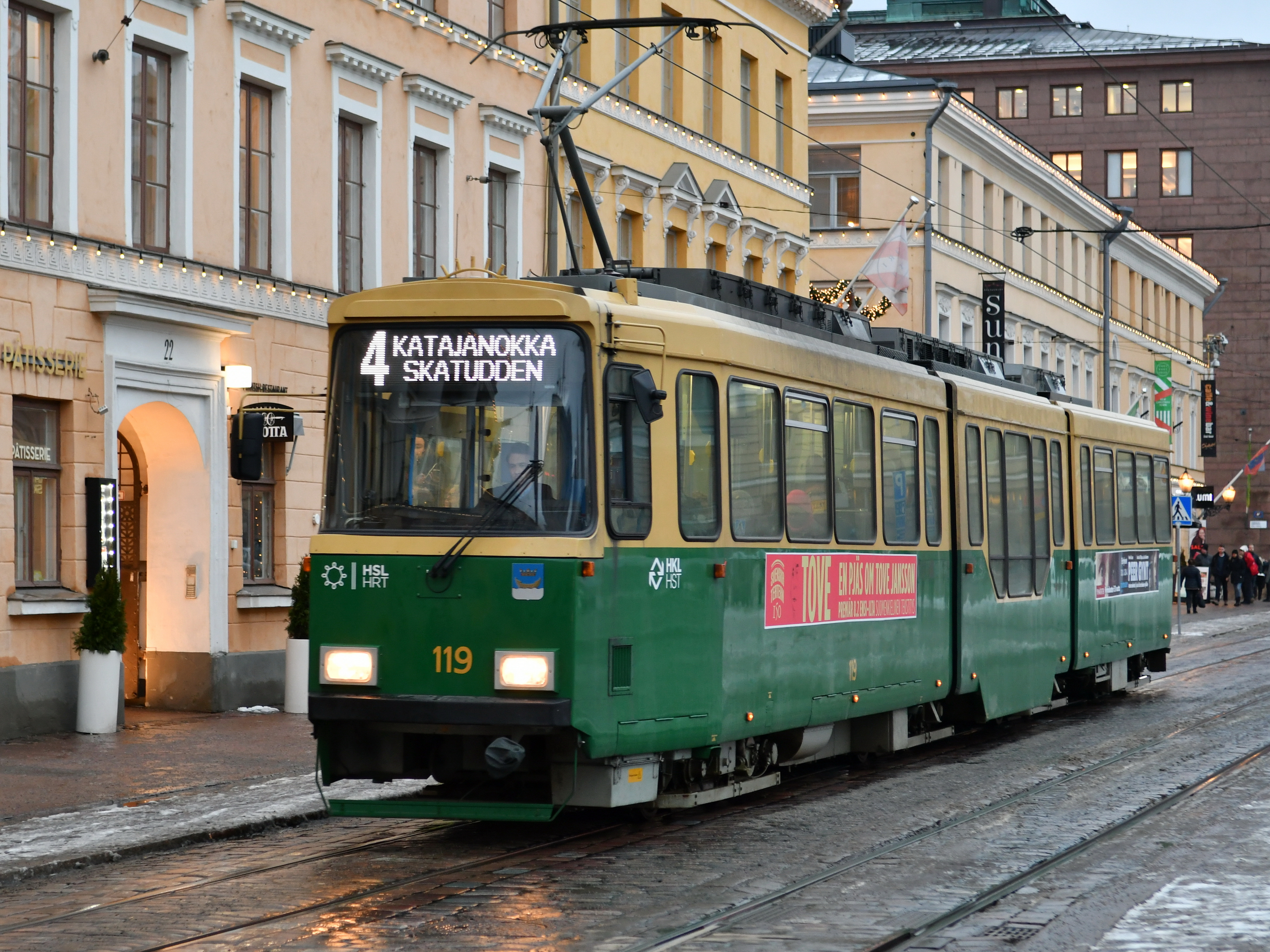
MLNRV I tram on line 4.

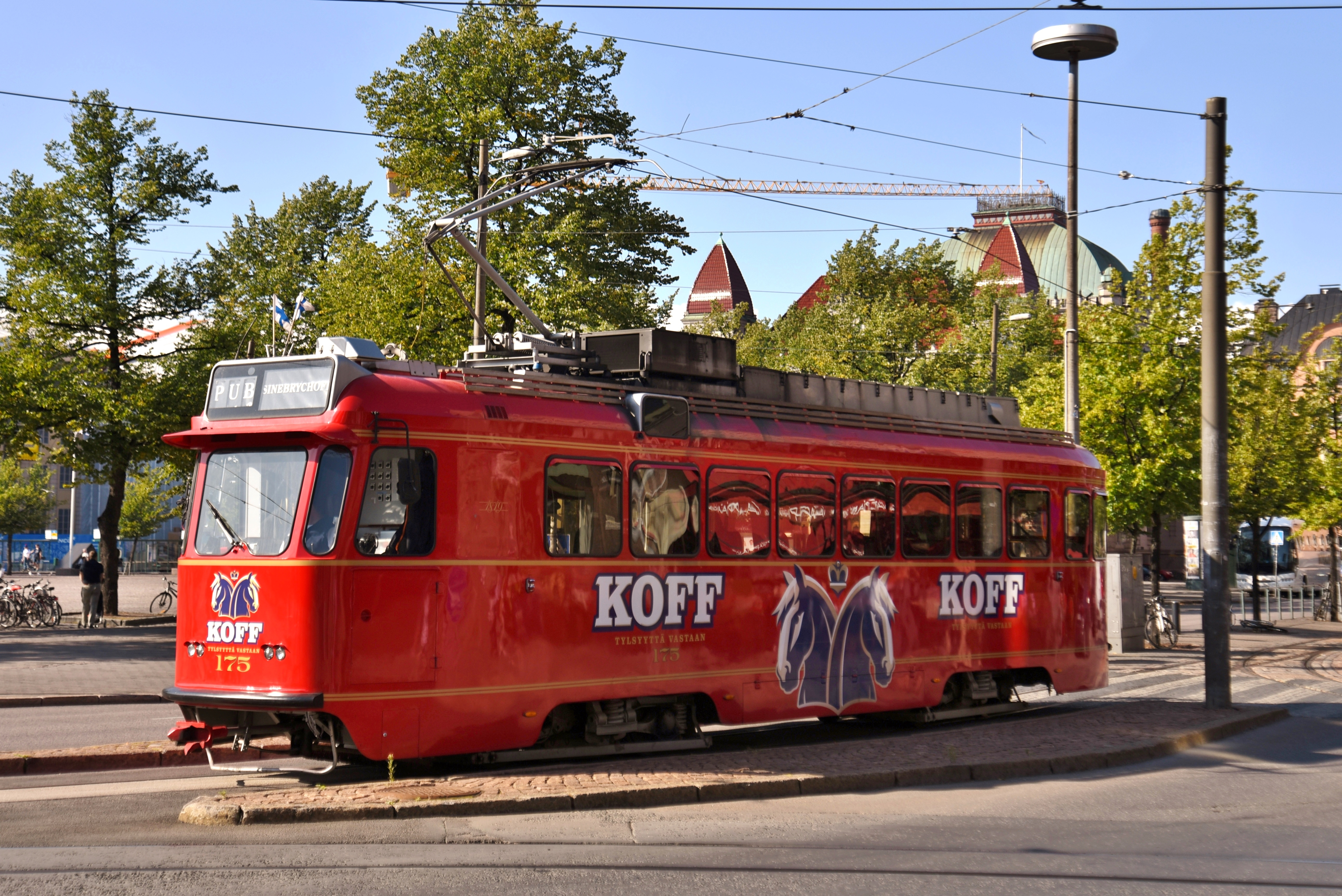
SpåraKoff, the so-called "pub tram", departing from Helsinki Railway Square

Tram on line 13 on the street Pasilansilta in Pasila.

As of November 2022, HKL has 122 tram units in scheduled passenger service. Additionally, there are trams in reserve and in charter use. The MLNRV I and II series (rebuilt Valmet Nr I and Valmet Nr II units) and Škoda Artic series comprise the city center fleet, and the light rail line 15 uses bidirectional Škoda Artic X54 units.

In 2006–2011, all Valmet Nr II (at that point known as NRV II) vehicles underwent a major modification process in which a 6.5 m (21 ft 4 in) low-floor midsection was added to the tram. The type designation was changed to MLNRV II to reflect the modifications made, and the longer trams were re-introduced in traffic gradually as the modification works were completed. During the process, HKL also rebuilt ten of the older Nr I trams (at that point known as NRV II) in the same way, which brought the total number of MLNRV trams to 52 upon completion in mid-2014.

The fully low-floor Variotram units, acquired in 1998–2003 from Adtranz (later Bombardier) and built by Transtech Oy in Otanmäki, proved to be unreliable, causing a shortage of operable trams. Starting in 2004, HKL purchased ten Duewag series second-hand trams from Mannheim in Germany to cover for the shortage. Eventually arrangements were made with Bombardier to keep a sufficient number of the units in operation. All of the Duewag units were either withdrawn or relegated to charter service by the end of 2014. All Variotrams were taken out of use in 2018 because of the problems.

Beginning in 2013, HKL acquired 72 new Artic trams. They have a double-articulated, eight-axle design, are 27.3 m (89 ft 7 in) long and have 74 fixed seats, 14 foldable seats and space for 75 standing passengers. The design has a 100% low floor and conventional, turning bogies designed to run without problems on Helsinki's challenging old-fashioned track network. Two prototype units were delivered in 2013, and each entered passenger service approximately two months after delivery. The first unit of the production series (out of 70), no. 403, arrived in Helsinki in January 2016. In 2018 both prototype units were sold to Schöneiche bei Berlin tramway.

Helsinki City Transport, the predecessor of Metropolitan Area Transport, has ordered 29 Artic X54 units for line 15, of which 15 are in service, and 23 for the Crown Bridges light rail lines. The first prototype unit arrived in Helsinki in April 2021.

Metropolitan Area Transport announced a tender in October 2023 to acquire new rolling stock to replace the aging MLNRV fleet and to support new services. In October 2025, Metropolitan Area Transport chose Stadler Rail to build 30 unidirectional and 33 bi-directional units based on the Stadler Tango platform for €271 million to replace old rolling stock as well as to support the Vantaa light rail and West Helsinki light rail extensions to the network. The contract was formally signed on 11 November 2026, with an option for up to 120 more units.

Rolling stock as of November 2022
Model	Type	No. of units	Car #	Built	Acquired	Modified	Seats	Standees	L	W	H
MLNRV I (Valmet Nr I)	City center	10	113–122	1973–75	1973–75	1993–2003, 2005, 2012–14	49	120	26.5	2.3	3.7
MLNRV II (Valmet Nr II)	City center	42	71–112	1983–87	1983–87	1996–2006, 2008–12	49	120	26.5	2.3	3.7
Škoda Transtech Artic	City center	70	403–472	2012–2019	2013–2019		88	125	27.6	2.4	3.8
Škoda Transtech Artic X54	Light rail	20 (32 more total on order)	601-652	2019–	2021–		78+4	136	34.0	2.4	3.8
Totals		122					8,708	14,990			

Former rolling stock
Tram type	No. of units	Car #	Built	Acquired	Modified	Seats	Standees	L	W	H
HRO A9	1	1 (Note: A replica of Brändö Spårvägs Ab tram number 1 from 1917.)	1917	2007	2007	28	0	11.5	2.2	
HRO A7	1	135	1928	1928	1988	21	26	10.2	2.1	3.7
HRO A4	1	157	1930	1930	1987	21	26	10.2	2.1	3.7
Karia HM IV	1	320	1955	1955	1985	29	69	13.5	2.3	3.6
Valmet RM 1	2	332, 339 (Note: Number 339 is owned by Oy Stadin Ratikat Ab.)	1955	1955	1987, 2003–04	29	69	13.5	2.3	3.6
Karia HM V	6	9–14, 175 (Note: Number 175, SpåraKoff, is a mobile bar.)	1959	1959	2004–07	31	57	13.5	2.3	3.6
Duewag GT8N	1	166	1962, 1964	2007–08	1991–92	55	120	25.7	2.2	3.8
Duewag GT8	1	150	1967	2004	1970, 2004	64	140	25.7	2.2	3.8
NRV (Valmet Nr I)	30	31–70	1973–75	1973–75	1993–2003, 2005	39	106	20.1	2.3	3.7
MLRV Bombardier Variotram	40	201–240	1998–2003	1998–2003		55	80	24.4	2.3	3.7
Škoda Transtech Artic (Prototype)	2	401-402	2013	2013		88	125	27.6	2.4	3.8

=== Depots ===
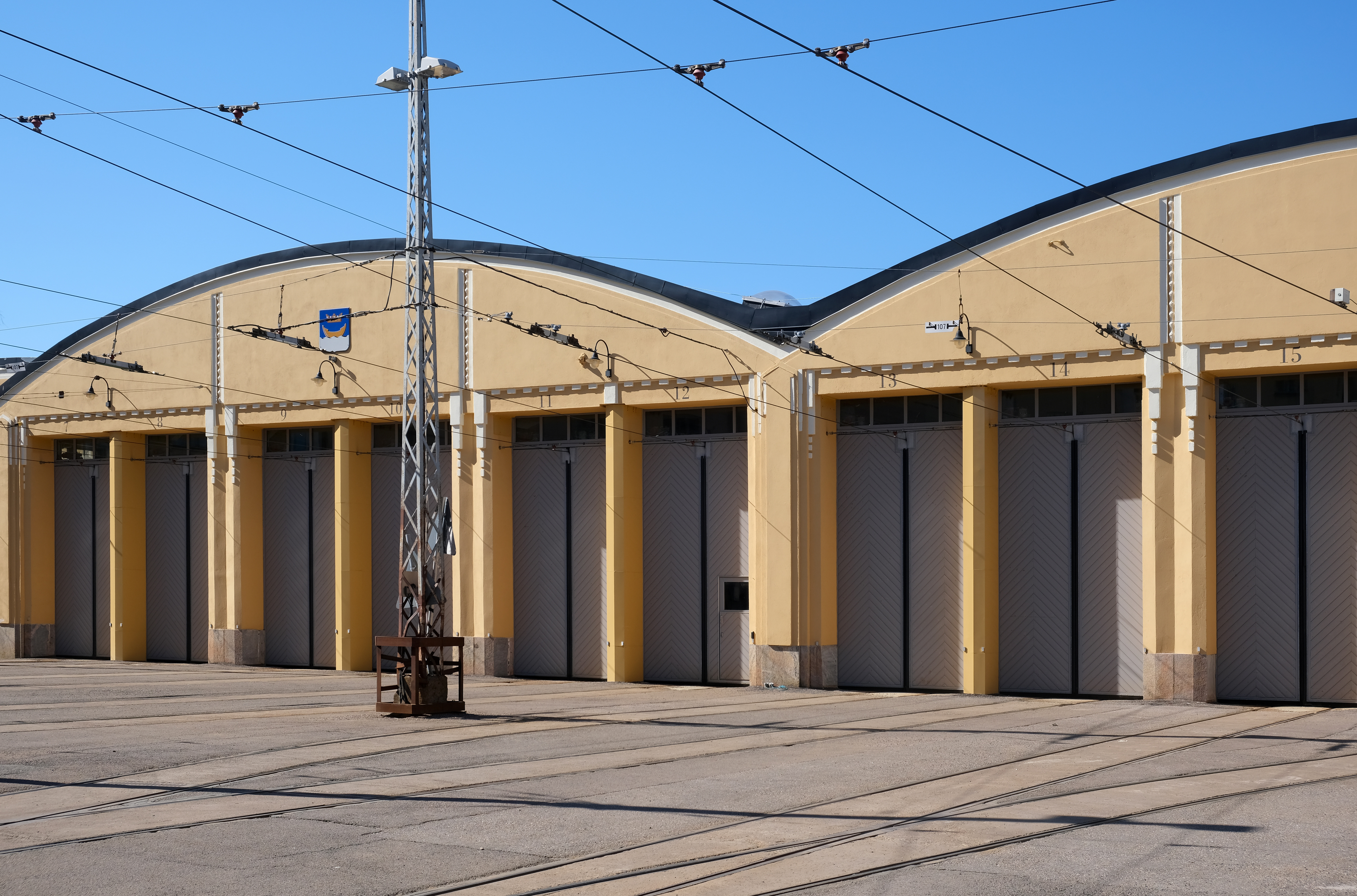
Töölö tram depot.

As of April 2023, there are several tram depots and workshops in Helsinki. The city center tram services currently use Töölö and Koskela and a maintenance facility in Vallila. A new depot for 100 trams and 200 buses is being built in Ruskeasuo and the new depot, combined with a rebuild of the aging Koskela depot, is planned to eventually fully replace the Töölö and Vallila facilities.

Line 15 (Jokeri light rail) has a separate depot in Roihupelto. The Crown Bridges light rail lines will have as separate depot constructed in Yliskylä, originally due to be completed in 2026.

== See also ==
- Helsinki Metro
- Trams in Finland
  - Tampere light rail

== Bibliography ==
Miscellaneous

- "Helsinki Public Transport Signal Priority and Passenger Information (HeLMi)". Public Transport Telematics. Helsinki Urban Traffic Control Centre. Archived from the original on 2008-06-11.
