= West Helsinki light rail =

Light rail project under construction in Helsinki, Finland

West Helsinki light rail (Finnish: Länsi-Helsingin raitiotie) is a public transit project under construction in Helsinki, Finland, to build about 5.5 kilometres (3.4 mi) of light rail track from Munkkiniemi along Huopalahdentie, Vihdintie and Kaupintie to Kannelmäki, and about 2.5 kilometres (1.6 mi) of track on Topeliuksenkatu to relieve capacity on the existing tracks on Mannerheimintie. The project was approved by the Helsinki City Council in January 2021 and construction began in 2026. As of 2023, the project was due to be completed 2030 or 2031.
