= Länsi-Pasila =

Coordinates: 60°12′N 024°55′E

Länsi-Pasila Västra Böle
- Helsinki Subdivision
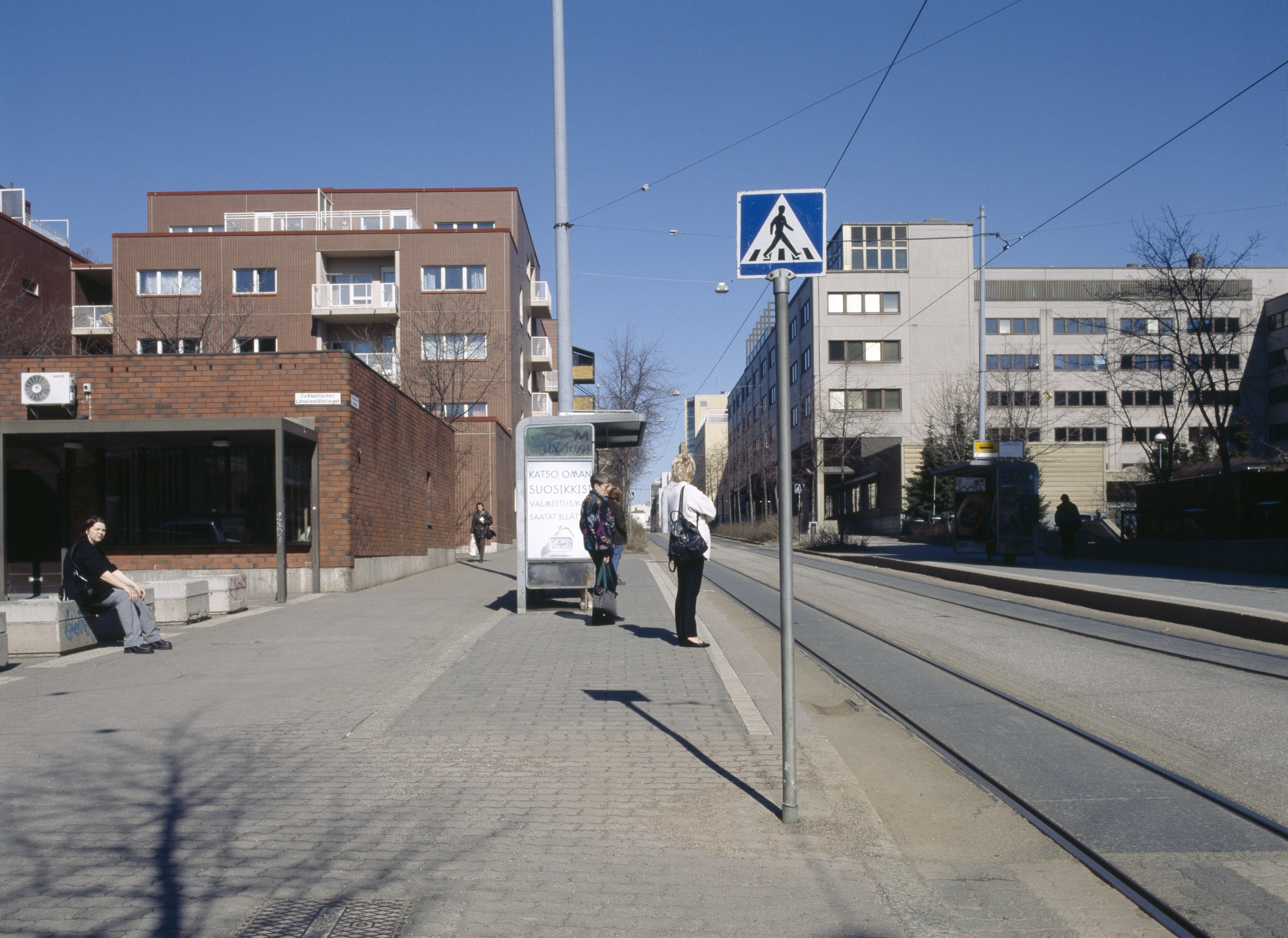

- Position of Länsi-Pasila within Helsinki
- Country: Finland
- Region: Uusimaa
- Sub-region: Greater Helsinki
- Municipality: Helsinki
- District: Central
- Area: 1.15 km^{2} (0.44 sq mi)
- Population: 4,308
  - Density: 3,746/km^{2} (9,700/sq mi)
- Postal codes: 00230, 00240, 00520
- Subdivision number: 171

Länsi-Pasila (Swedish: Västra Böle) is a subdivision of Pasila, Helsinki, Finland.
