= Valmet Nr II =

Nr II
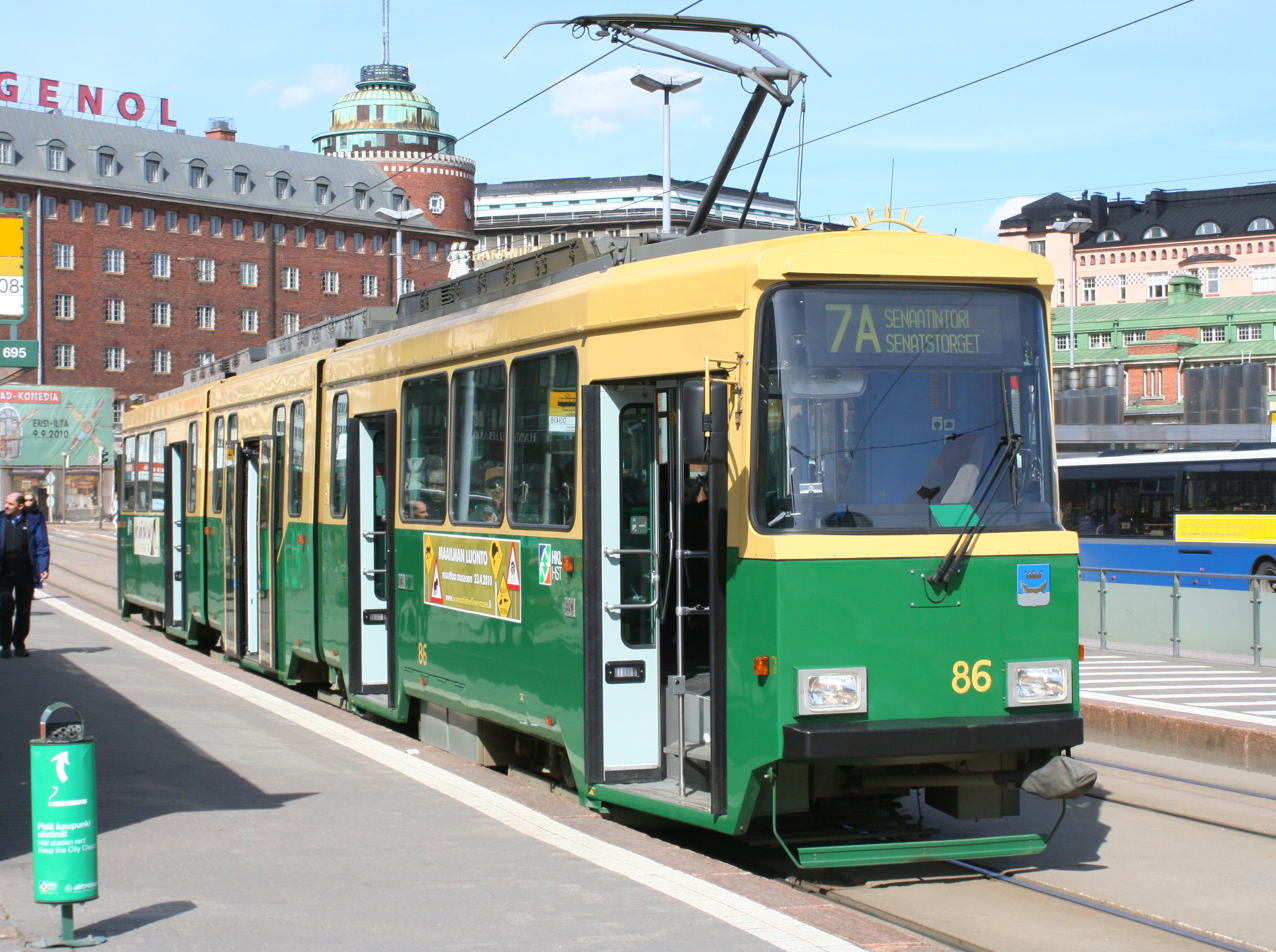
- An MLNRV II class tram (Nr II refitted with low-floor midsection) at Hakaniemi, Helsinki
- In service: 1983–present
- Manufacturer: Valmet
- Built at: Valmet airplane factory, Tampere
- Constructed: 1983–87
- Entered service: 1983
- Refurbished: 1996–2005; 2006‒2011 (addition of low-floor middle section)
- Number built: 42
- Number in service: 42
- Fleet numbers: 71‒112
- Capacity: 39 seats, 100 standing (original); 49 seats, 120 standing (low-floor)
- Operators: Helsinki City Transport (HKL)
- Lines served: All HKL tram lines

Specifications
- Car length: 20 m (65 ft 7 3/8 in) original construction 26.50 m (86 ft 11 1/4 in) with low-floor midsection
- Width: 2.3 m (7 ft 6 1/2 in)
- Height: 3.7 m (12 ft 1 5/8 in) with pantograph down
- Floor height: 0.91 m (2 ft 11 7/8 in); 0.39 m (1 ft 3 3/8 in) low-floor section
- Maximum speed: 60 km/h (37 mph)
- Weight: 27.2 t (26.8 long tons; 30.0 short tons) (original); 33.5 t (33.0 long tons; 36.9 short tons) (low-floor)
- Traction system: Electric
- Traction motors: 2 × Strömberg GHCU / H6232
- Power output: 2 × 130 kW (original); 2 × 156 kW (low-floor)
- Electric system(s): 600 V DC overhead lines
- Current collector(s): Pantograph
- Braking system(s): Track / disc / electric
- Track gauge: 1,000 mm (3 ft 3 3/8 in) metre gauge

Nr II is a class of articulated six-axle (B′2′B′ wheel arrangement), chopper-driven tram operated by Helsinki City Transport (HKL) on the Helsinki tram network. All trams of this type were built by the Finnish metal industry corporation Valmet between the years 1983 and 1987.

Between 1996 and 2005 all trams in the class were modernised by HKL and redesignated as Nr II+ class. From 2006‒2011, all trams of this class were rebuilt with a low-floor midsection and redesignated as MLNRV II.

== History ==
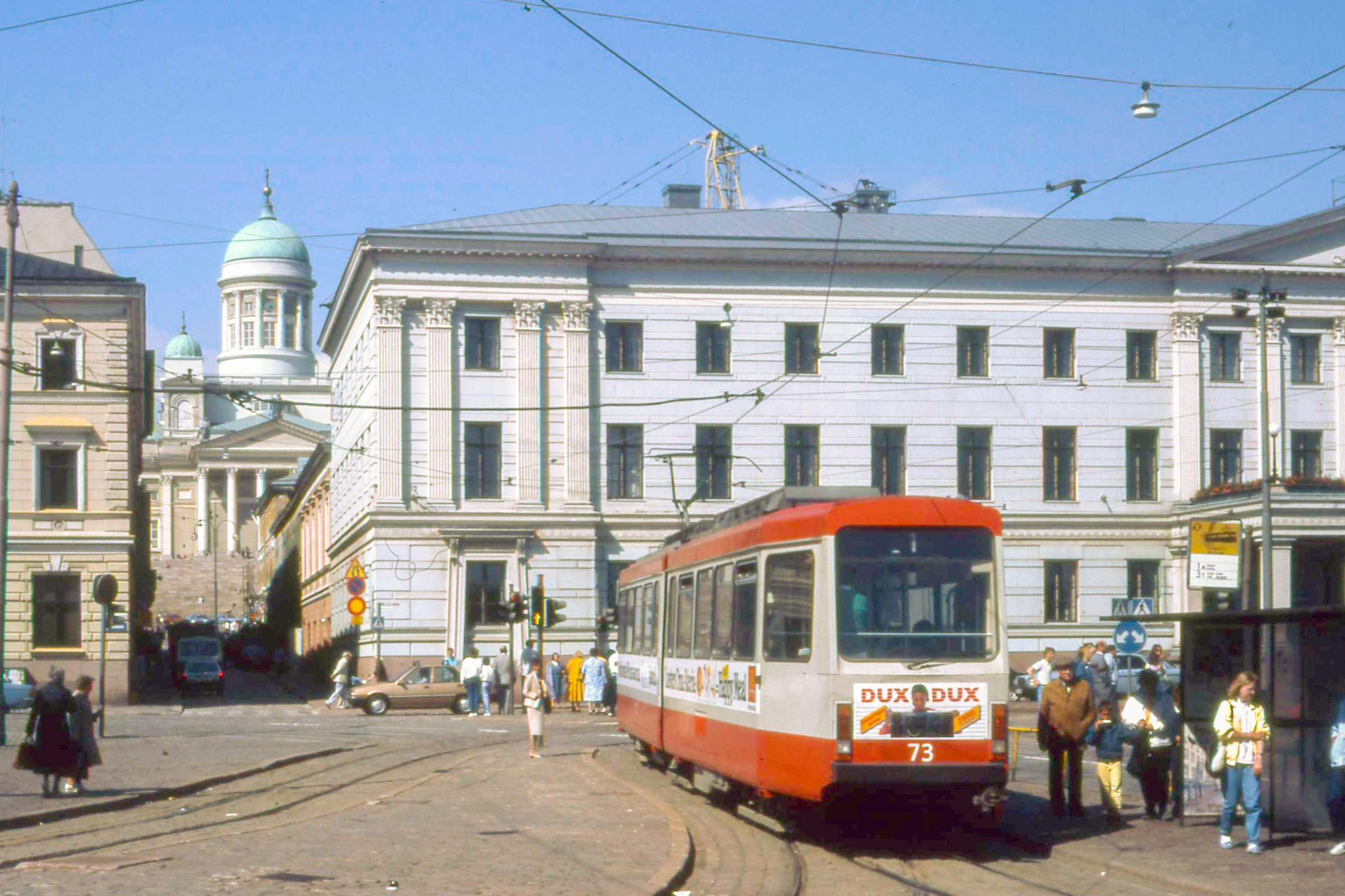
Nr II class tram in original orange/grey livery at Helsinki Market Square 1987.

The Nr II class was a further development of the Nr I class built by Valmet for the HKL between 1973 and 1975 (the Nr I was in turn based on the popular Duewag-built GT6 class). The Nr I and Nr II classes are virtually identical in their exterior and interior designs, with exception of the tail lights.

The first three Nr II class trams were delivered to Helsinki City Transport (HKL) in 1983, followed by an additional 11 in both 1984 and 1985, further ten in 1986, and the final seven in 1987.

The first tram in the class entered service for HKL in July 1983.

Between 1996 and 2005, all trams in this class were modernised with updates to the technics, changes to the interior layout, addition of electronic displays displaying the name of the next stop, as well as replacement of the original seats with new ones. Following the modernisation, the class was re-designated as Nr II+.

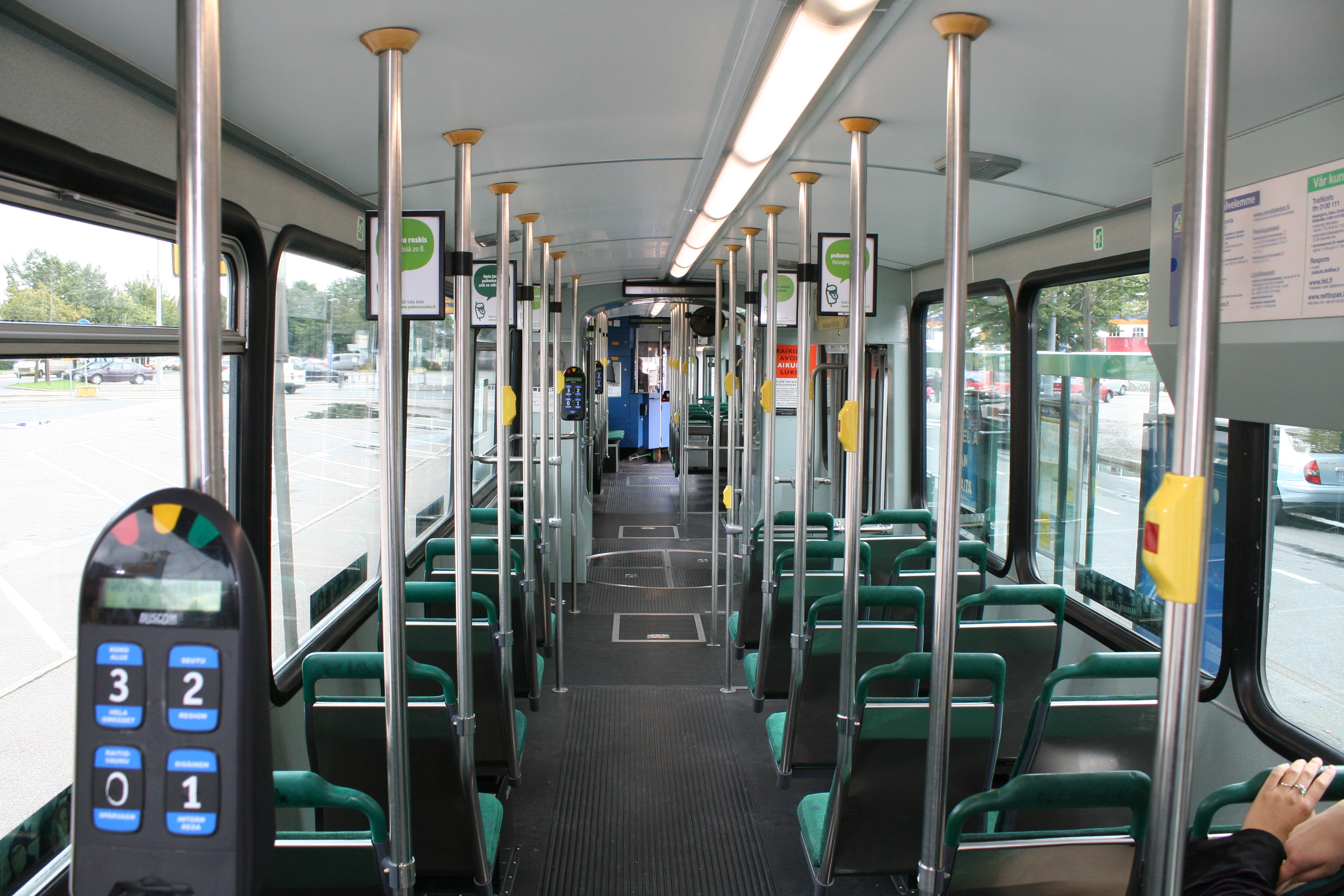
Interior of an Nr II tram after the 1996-2005 modernisation.

Between 2004 and 2007, all trams in the class were built with new line displays in the front and side of the tram, displaying both the number and destination on the line.

In 2006, tram number 80 was rebuilt with a new 6.5 m (21 ft 4 in) low-floor midsection, built by Verkehrs Industrie Systeme. As a result of the lengthening, the tram has a B′2′2′B′ wheel arrangement, and can accommodate 30 additional passengers. To cope with the added weight of the midsection, the output of the traction motors was increased by approximately 20%. Experiences with the prototype lengthened tram were positive, and the rest of the Nr II class were similarly rebuilt from 2008 until 2011.

== Accidents ==
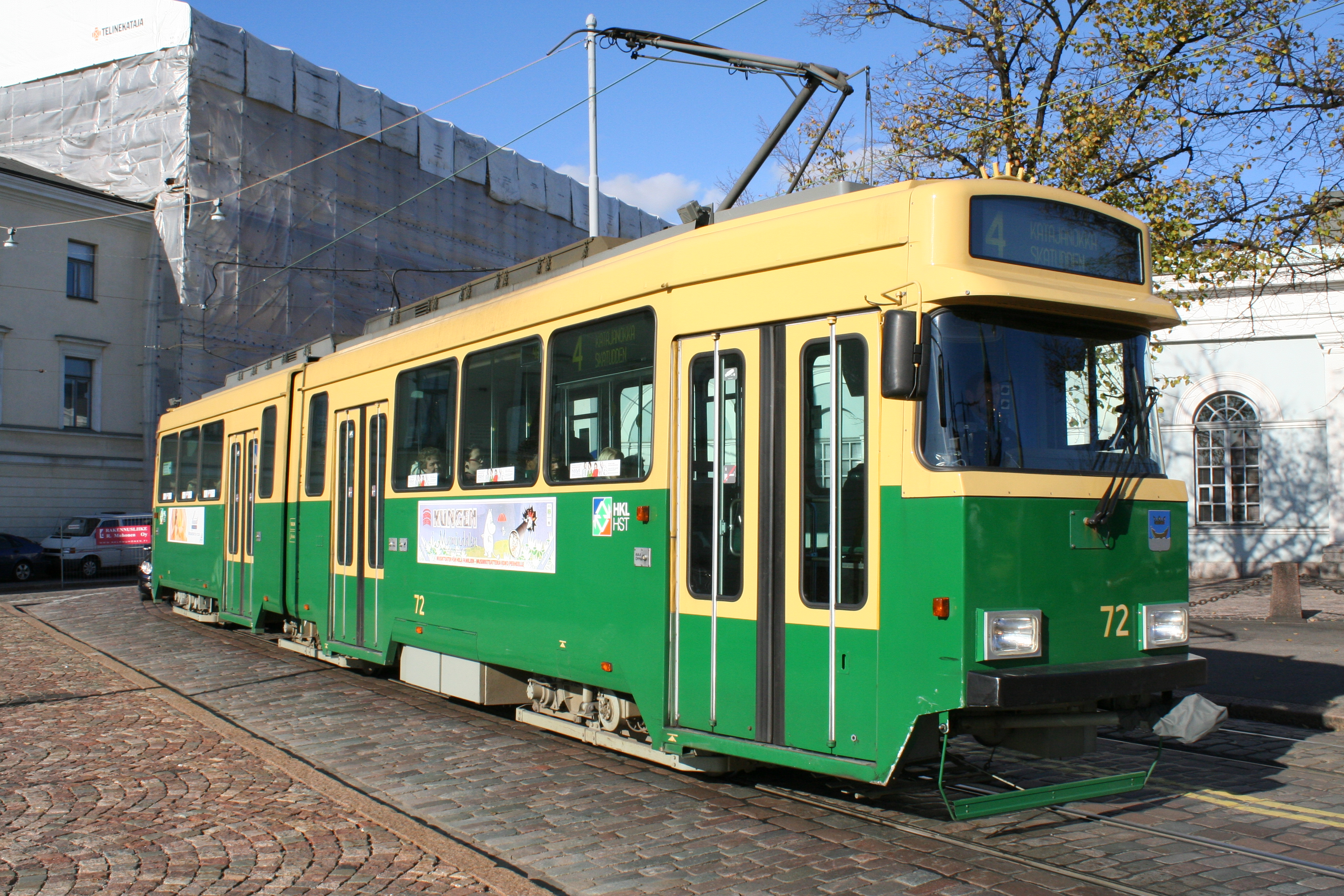
Number 72 was one of the three units rebuilt with a remodeled windshield following the accident in July 2003.

On July 21, 2003, one of the Nr II-class trams derailed at high speed in the junction between Mannerheimintie and Aleksanterinkatu in central Helsinki, and collided with a motorcycle, which resulted in the death of the motorcyclist.

An investigation into the causes of the accident revealed that the driver of the tram had lost consciousness shortly before the collision due to extreme heat in the cockpit of the tram. In 2005, as a result of the accident, HKL redesigned the windshield of three Nr II class trams, adding a large vizor that contains an air conditioning unit, which also shields the driver from direct sunlight. The visors were later removed and the original windshield restored.

== Future ==
The Nr II class are expected to remain in service at least until 2030.

== Liveries ==
Like the Nr I class, the first Nr II class trams were originally painted in an orange/grey colour scheme. In 1986 HKL abandoned the unpopular colour scheme, and from tram number 104 onwards the Nr II class trams were delivered in HKL's traditional green/yellow livery. By 1995 all units in the class had been repainted in the classic livery.

== See also ==
- Trams in Finland
