= Valmet Nr I =

Nr I
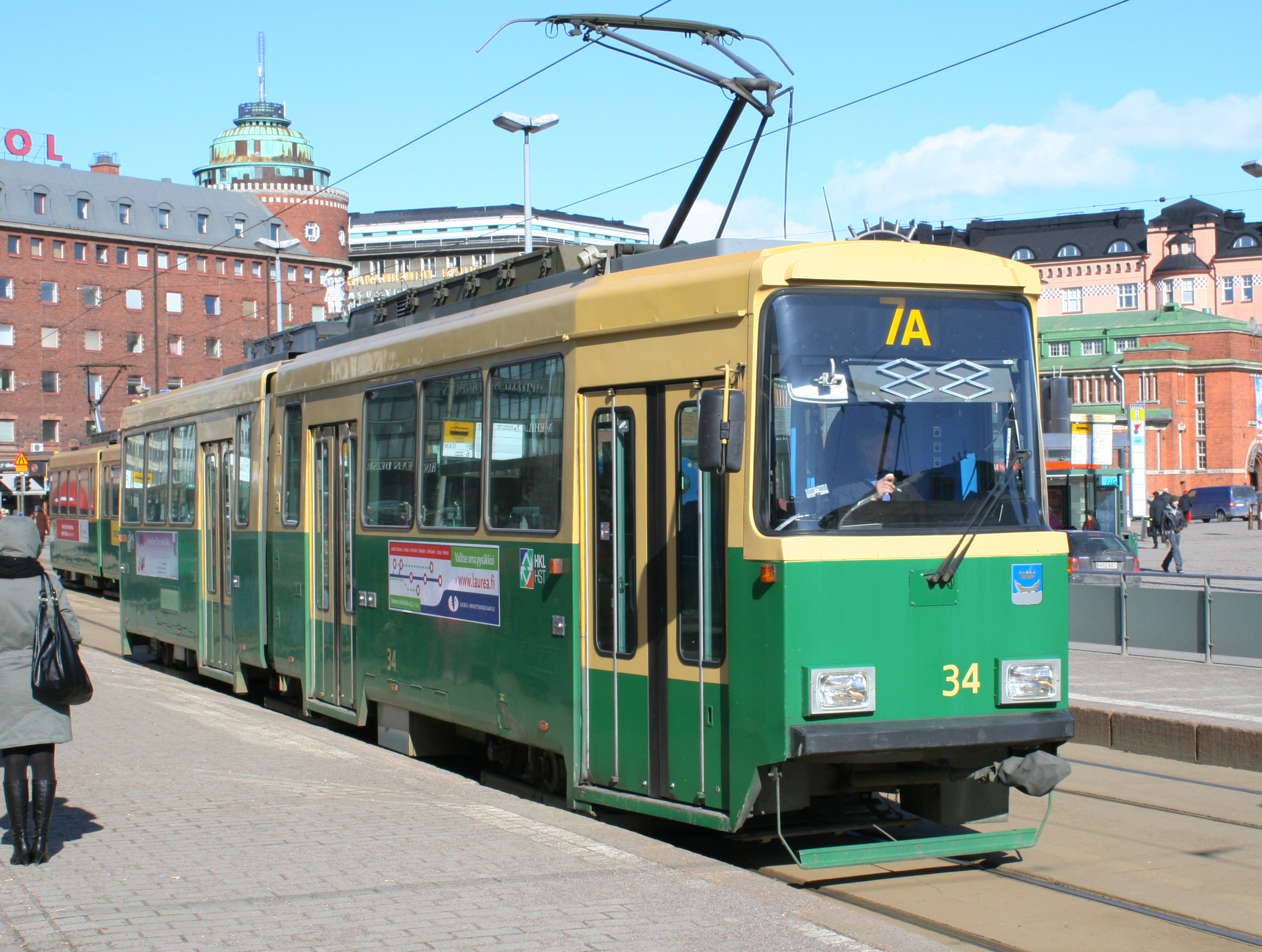
- An Nr I class tram at Hakaniemi in Helsinki
- In service: 1973–present
- Manufacturer: Valmet
- Built at: Valmet airplane factory, Tampere
- Constructed: 1973–75
- Entered service: 1973
- Refurbished: 1993–2003 (1st modernisation); 2005 onwards (2nd modernisation)
- Number built: 40
- Number in service: 10
- Fleet numbers: 31–70
- Capacity: 39 passenger seats; 106 standing places
- Operators: Helsinki City Transport (HKL)
- Lines served: All HKL tram lines

Specifications
- Car length: 20.10 m (65 ft 11 3/8 in)
- Width: 2.3 m (7 ft 6 1/2 in)
- Height: 3.7 m (12 ft 1 5/8 in) with pantograph down
- Floor height: Approx. 0.91 m (2 ft 11 7/8 in)
- Maximum speed: 60 km/h (37 mph)
- Weight: 28 tonnes (27.6 long tons; 30.9 short tons)
- Traction system: Electric
- Traction motors: 2 × Strömberg GHCU / H6232
- Power output: 2 × 130 kW (170 hp) / 260 kW (350 hp)
- Electric system(s): 600 V DC overhead lines
- Current collection: Pantograph
- Braking system(s): Track / disc / electric
- Track gauge: 1,000 mm (3 ft 3 3/8 in) metre gauge

Nr I is a class of articulated six-axle (B′2′B′ wheel arrangement), chopper-driven tram operated by Helsinki City Transport on the Helsinki tram network. All trams of this type were built by the Finnish metal industry corporation Valmet between the years 1973 and 1975.

Between 1993 and 2004 all trams in the class were modernised by HKL and redesignated as Nr I+ class. Currently HKL classifies them as NRV I.

== Overview ==
Nr I were the first type of articulated tram operated by the HKL. The design of the Nr I type trams was based on the GT6 type trams built by Duewag for various cities in western Europe since 1956, but the Nr I incorporated several technological innovations that had not been available when the GT6 was designed. The Nr I trams were delivered by Valmet between 1973 and 1975, with the first seven trams delivered in 1973, further 18 delivered in 1974 and the final 15 in 1975. As the first mass-produced tram type in the world, the Nr I featured thyristor chopper control. The first tram of this class entered revenue-earning service on 16 December 1973 on line 10. Although the trams of this type are numbered 31 to 70, the first unit was not the 31st tram to be used by the HKL. The HKL tram numbering system had been reset in 1959, with the numbering of new trams delivered that year beginning from 1.

In the early 80s the city of Gothenburg, the forerunner in creation of modern light rail systems in Europe, wished to purchase Nr I -based trams from Valmet for its own tram network. However, due to pressure from the Swedish government, Göteborgs spårvägar were forced to place an order with the Swedish ASEA instead. In Helsinki a further developed version of the Nr I, the Nr II class, was delivered by Valmet for HKL between 1983 and 1987. The Nr II class trams have an identical external appearance and very similar interior layout to the Nr I class.

From November 1993 onwards, starting with tram number 45, all Nr I units were modernised by HKL into Nr I+ class. The modernisation included updates to the technics of the trams, changes to the interior layout, addition of electronic displays displaying the name of the next stop, as well as replacement of the original seats with new ones. The last tram to be modernised was number 53, modernised in July 2004.

A second modernisation process, labelled "life extension programme" by the HKL, begun in 2005. Like the earlier process, this programme includes updating much of the technics and changes to the interiors. Additionally the chassis of the trams will be sand-blasted and given a new surface finish. For some trams the life extension programme will be carried out in Germany.

== Liveries ==
For the Nr I type trams, HKL decided to adopt a new livery. Instead of the traditional green/yellow colours, the new trams were painted light grey, with an orange stripes running along the top and bottom of the carriage. In 1986 HKL decided to abandon the unpopular orange/grey livery, and by 1995 all trams of this type were painted in the green/yellow colours, with the top half of the tram painted yellow and the bottom half green.

Tram number 45, the first to be modernised into Nr I+ class, was painted in an experimental livery coinciding with the modernisation. The livery was identical with the standard green/yellow colours, but had an additional narrow yellow stripe running along the bottom of the carriage. This livery was not adapted to any other trams, and number 45 later reverted to the standard livery.

== Interior layout and design ==
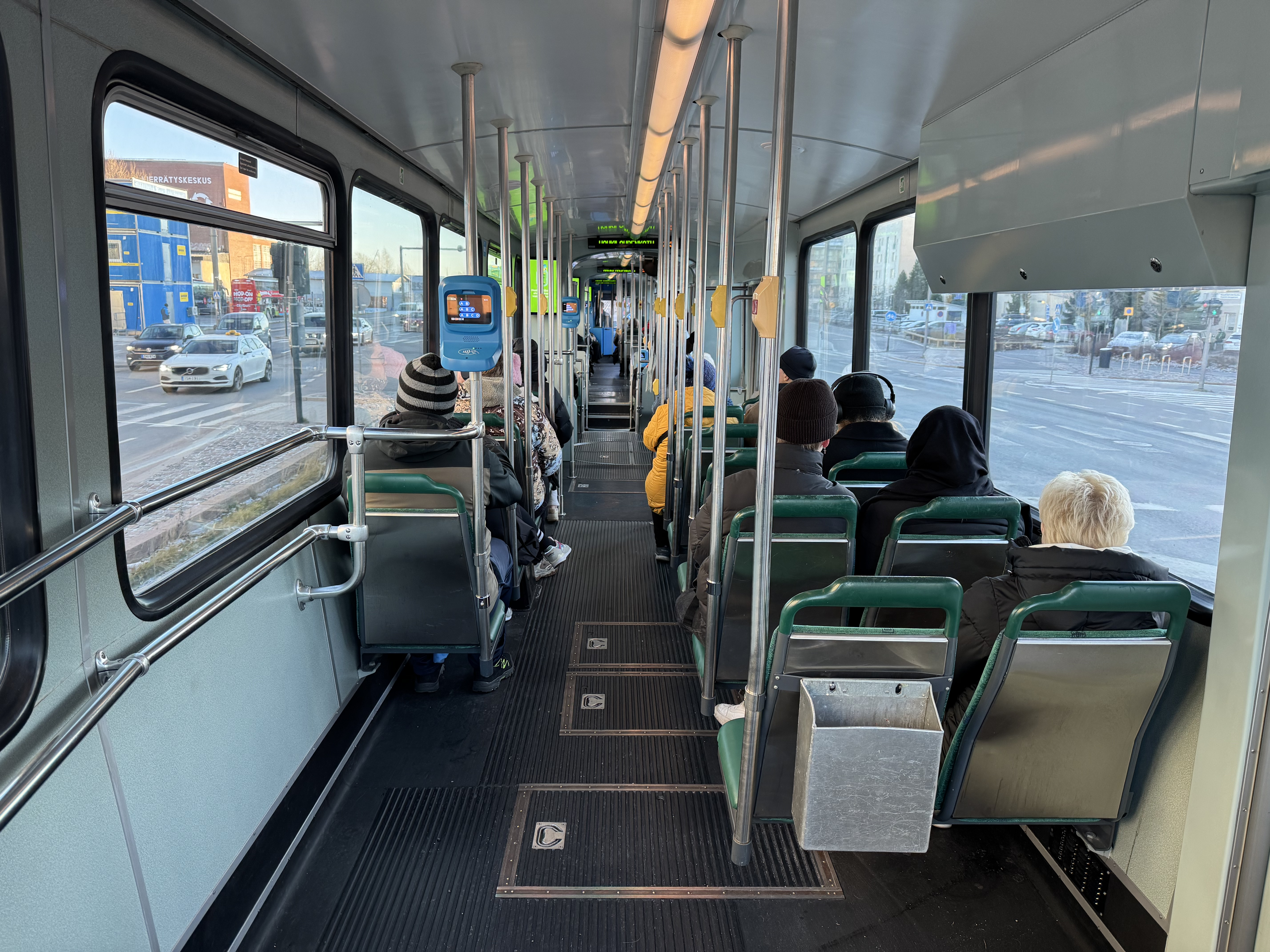
Interior of an Nr I tram with low-floor extension.

As built the Nr I class trams had a seating capacity of 41, with approximately 100 standing places, with the exception of the last tram of the class, number 70, which only had 39 passenger seats. Subsequently, the number of seats in all units was redecued by two, bringing the seating capacity down to 39 for numbers 31–69 and 37 for number 70.

From 1982 onwards the conductor's seat was removed from all units (from thereon tickets were sold by the driver), and coinciding with this the seating arrangements of all Nr I trams was standardised to 39 passenger seats. Following the 1993–2004 modernisation process, HKL officially gives the seating capacity of all units as 39, with 106 standing places.

Originally the seats of the Nr I class were covered beige-coloured artificial leather upholstery. As a part of the first modernisation process the original seats were substituted with ones upholstered in green fabric and featuring headrests made from green plastic.

== Future ==
HKL are planning to order 40 new low-floor trams to enter service between 2009 and 2016. Coinciding with this, some of the Nr I class units are planned to be withdrawn from service. The Nr II class trams have been fitted with a low-floor midsection from 2006 onwards, and fitting the Nr I class units with similar midsections to increase their lifespan is also reported to be under consideration (as of June 2008).

== See also ==
- Trams in Finland
