= Arab (disambiguation) =

The Arabs are an ethnic group native to West Asia and North Africa.

- Arabic language
  - Varieties of Arabic
- Arabic script
  - Arabic alphabet
  - Arabic (Unicode block)
- Arabic numerals
- Arab world
- Etymology of Arab

Arab, Arabic, Ərəb or Arap may also refer to:

== Places ==
=== Azerbaijan ===
- Ərəb, Agdash, Azerbaijan
- Ərəb, Khachmaz, Azerbaijan
- Ərəb, Masally, Azerbaijan
- Ərəb Qubalı, Azerbaijan
- Ərəb Yengicə, Azerbaijan

=== Iran ===
- Arab, Iran, a village in North Khorasan Province, Iran
- Arab, Firuzabad, a village in Fars Province, Iran
- Arab, South Khorasan, a village in South Khorasan Province, Iran

=== United States ===
- Arab, Alabama, United States
- Arab, Missouri, United States

== People ==
- Arap, a clan of the Somali Isaaq clan family
- Arab (born Abrahim Mustafa), an American rapper, a member of S.O.D. Money Gang Inc. alongside Soulja Boy and JBar
- Leila Arab (born 1971), an Iranian-born and London-based recording artist, producer and DJ
- Mohamed Arab (born 1948), Egyptian politician

== Biology ==
- Arabian horse, often called an "Arab" within the equestrian community
- araB, a bacterial gene promoter
- Colotis, a genus of butterflies sometimes referred to as the Arabs
- Gum arabic

== Sports ==
- Arab (horse), a British Thoroughbred racehorse foaled in 1824
- Arabs, the nickname for the fans of Dundee United Football Club

== Transport ==
- Arab (automobile), a 1920s British car
- Arab class gunvessel, a 19th-century class of Royal Navy gunboat
- Sunbeam Arab, a British World War I-era aircraft engine

=== Ships ===
- Arab, a 484 or 485 ton copper sheathed ship (originally 415 ton) built at Stockton in 1840 and chartered by the New Zealand Company
- HMS Arab, the name of seven ships of the Royal Navy
- SS Arab, launched in 1879
- SS Arabic, multiple ships
  - SS Arabic (1902), a British passenger ship sunk by a German submarine in 1915
  - SS Arabic (1920), a German-built passenger liner, operated by the British White Star Line after World War 1

== Media and entertainment ==
- The Arab (magazine), a Middle-Eastern affairs online magazine
- Arabs (book), a 2019 book of non-fiction
- The Arabs, backing band of reggae musician Prince Far I
- "Arabic", a song by the British punk band Gang of Four (band)
- The Arab (1915 film), directed by Cecil B. DeMille
- The Arab (1924 film), directed by Rex Ingram
- Arab Money, a song by Busta Rhymes

== Other uses ==
- Amateur Radio Association of Bahrain
- Arab (number), transliteration of the Hindi term for one billion in the Indian numbering system

== See also ==
- Arabia (disambiguation)
- Arabian (disambiguation)
- Arabistan (disambiguation)
