= Ərəb =

Ərəb may refer to:

- Ərəb, Agdash, Azerbaijan
- Ərəb, Khachmaz, Azerbaijan
- Ərəb, Masally, Azerbaijan
- Ərəb Qubalı, Azerbaijan
- Ərəb, Lachin, Azerbaijan
- Ərəb Yengicə, Azerbaijan
