= Arab, Azerbaijan =

Arab, Afghanistan or Ərəb may refer to:

- Ərəb, Agdash
- Ərəb, Khachmaz
- Arab, Masally
- Ərəb Qubalı
- Ərəb Yengicə
