= Arabia (disambiguation) =

Arabia may refer to:

== Geography ==
- The Arabian Peninsula
- The Arab world
- Saudi Arabia, the largest country in the Arabian Peninsula
- Latin and Achaemenid terms for parts of Arabia:
  - Arabia Deserta, the desert interior of the Arabian Peninsula in modern-day Saudi Arabia
  - Arabia Petraea, a Roman province
  - Arabia Felix, Roman term for what is today Yemen
  - Arabia (satrapy), a satrapy (province) of the Achaemenid Empire and later of the Sassanid Empire, by the name of Arabistan
- South Arabia, modern-day Yemen, southern Oman, and southwestern Saudi Arabia
- Arabia, Finland, a neighbourhood of Helsinki
- Arabia, Nebraska, a community in the United States

== People ==
- Arabia (daughter of Justin II), the daughter of Byzantine emperor Justin II (r. 565–578) and empress Sophia

== Language ==
- A romanized spelling of `Arabiyya = Arabic

== Astronomy ==
- 1157 Arabia, an asteroid
- Arabia Terra, a region of Mars' northern hemisphere
- Arabia quadrangle, one of a series of 30 quadrangle maps of Mars used by the United States Geological Survey Astrogeology Research Program

== Ships ==
- SS Arabia (1852), an ocean liner and mail steamer built for Cunard
- Arabia (steamboat), sunk in the Missouri River in 1856 and excavated from 1988 to 1989
- Arabia (barque), foundered in Lake Huron in 1884
- RMS Arabia (1897), an ocean liner and mail steamer built for P&O and torpedoed in 1916
- USS Arabia (ID-3434), a United States Navy patrol vessel in commission during 1918

== Other ==
- Arabia (company), a Finnish ceramics manufacturer
- Arabia (shopping centre), a shopping centre in Helsinki, Finland
- Arabia With Levison Wood, a travel documentary series

== See also ==
- Arab (disambiguation)
- Arabian (disambiguation)
- Arabistan (disambiguation)
