= List of ships named Arabia =

A number of ships have been named Arabia including:

- Arabia (1851), a paddle passenger and mail steamer launched for Cunard, sold to Royal Mail Line and completed as La Plata
- Arabia (1852), a paddle passenger and mail steamer built for Cunard, scrapped in 1867
- Arabia (1853), a steamboat sunk in the Missouri River in 1856 and excavated from 1988 to 1989
- Arabia (1853), a barque foundered in Lake Huron in 1884, now a diving site
- Arabia (1863), a passenger-cargo liner built for British India Steam Navigation
- Arabia (1883), a passenger-cargo liner built for Anchor Line
- Arabia (1896), a cargo liner built for Hamburg America Line, renamed Barcelona, and an Italian prize in WW2
- Arabia (1897), an ocean liner and mail steamer built for P&O and torpedoed in 1916
- Arabia (1901), a cargo liner built for Hamburg America Line,
- USS Arabia (ID-3434) (1903), a fishing trawler that served as a naval patrol vessel in commission 1918–1919
- Arabia (1925), an Italian cargo liner, captured in 1940, becoming a Royal Navy coaling hulk

== See also ==
- Arabia (disambiguation)
