= Kalateh-ye Arab =

Kalateh-ye Arab or Kalateh Arab (Persian: كلاته عرب) may refer to:

- Kalateh-ye Arab, Razavi Khorasan
- Kalateh-ye Arab, South Khorasan
- Kalateh-ye Arabha
