= Fairfield Creek =

Stream in Nebraska, U.S.

Fairfield Creek Tributary to Niobrara River
- Location of Fairfield Creek mouth Fairfield Creek (the United States)

Location
- Country: United States
- State: Nebraska
- County: Brown; Cherry

Physical characteristics
- Source: Schlagel Creek divide
  - location: about 4 miles west-northwest of Arabia, Nebraska
  - coordinates: 42°44′3.01″N 100°27′22.47″W
  - elevation: 2,764 ft (842 m)
- Mouth: Niobrara River
  - location: about 5.5 miles south of Norden, Nebraska
  - coordinates: 42°47′8.01″N 100°03′46.44″W
  - elevation: 2,123 ft (647 m)
- Length: 24.97 mi (40.19 km)
- Basin size: 105.16 square miles (272.4 km^{2})
- Discharge
  - location: Niobrara River
  - average: 10.25 cu ft/s (0.290 m^{3}/s) at mouth with Niobrara River

Basin features
- Progression: Niobrara River → Missouri River → Mississippi River → Gulf of Mexico
- River system: Niobrara
- Tributaries
  - left: unnamed tributaries
  - right: South Fork Fairfield Creek
- Waterbodies: Swan Lake
- Bridges: US 20

Fairfield Creek is a 24.97 mi (40.19 km) long third-order tributary to the Niobrara River in Brown County, Nebraska.

== Course ==
Fairfield Creek begins on the Schlagel Creek divide at Swan Lake in the Nebraska Sandhills about 4 miles (6.4 km) west-northwest of Arabia, Nebraska of and then flows generally east to join the Niobrara River about 5.5 miles (8.9 km) south of Norden, Nebraska.

== Watershed ==
Fairfield Creek drains 105.16 square miles (272.4 km^{2}) of area, receives about 21.35 in/year (54.2 cm/year) of precipitation, and is about 2.02% forested.

== See also ==
- List of rivers of Nebraska
