= South Fork Fairfield Creek =

Stream in Nebraska, U.S.

South Fork Fairfield Creek Tributary to Fairfield Creek
- Location of South Fork Fairfield Creek mouth South Fork Fairfield Creek (the United States)

Location
- Country: United States
- State: Nebraska
- County: Brown; Cherry

Physical characteristics
- Source: Evergreen Creek divide
  - location: about 7 miles east of Arabia, Nebraska
  - coordinates: 42°43′44.01″N 100°18′44.46″W
  - elevation: 2,670 ft (810 m)
- Mouth: Fairfield Creek
  - location: about 10 miles east-northeast of Arabia, Nebraska
  - coordinates: 42°45′35.01″N 100°10′54.45″W
  - elevation: 2,392 ft (729 m)
- Length: 8.86 mi (14.26 km)
- Basin size: 45.22 square miles (117.1 km^{2})
- Discharge
  - location: Fairfield Creek
  - average: 4.67 cu ft/s (0.132 m^{3}/s) at mouth with Fairfield Creek

Basin features
- Progression: Fairfield Creek → Niobrara River → Missouri River → Mississippi River → Gulf of Mexico
- River system: Niobrara
- Tributaries
  - left: unnamed tributaries
  - right: unnamed tributaries
- Bridges: none

South Fork Fairfield Creek is a 8.86 mi (14.26 km) long second-order tributary to Fairfield Creek in Brown County, Nebraska.

== Course ==
South Fork Fairfield Creek begins on the Evergreen Creek divide in the Nebraska Sandhills about 7 miles (11 km) east of Arabia, Nebraska and then flows generally east to join Fairfield Creek about 10 miles (16 km) east-northeast of Arabia, Nebraska.

== Watershed ==
South Fork Fairfield Creek drains 45.22 square miles (117.1 km^{2}) of area, receives about 21.45 in/year (54.5 cm/year) of precipitation, and is about 0.42% forested.

== See also ==
- List of rivers of Nebraska
