= Arabianranta =

Quarter in Toukola, Helsinki, Finland

Coordinates: 60°12′15″N 24°58′30″E

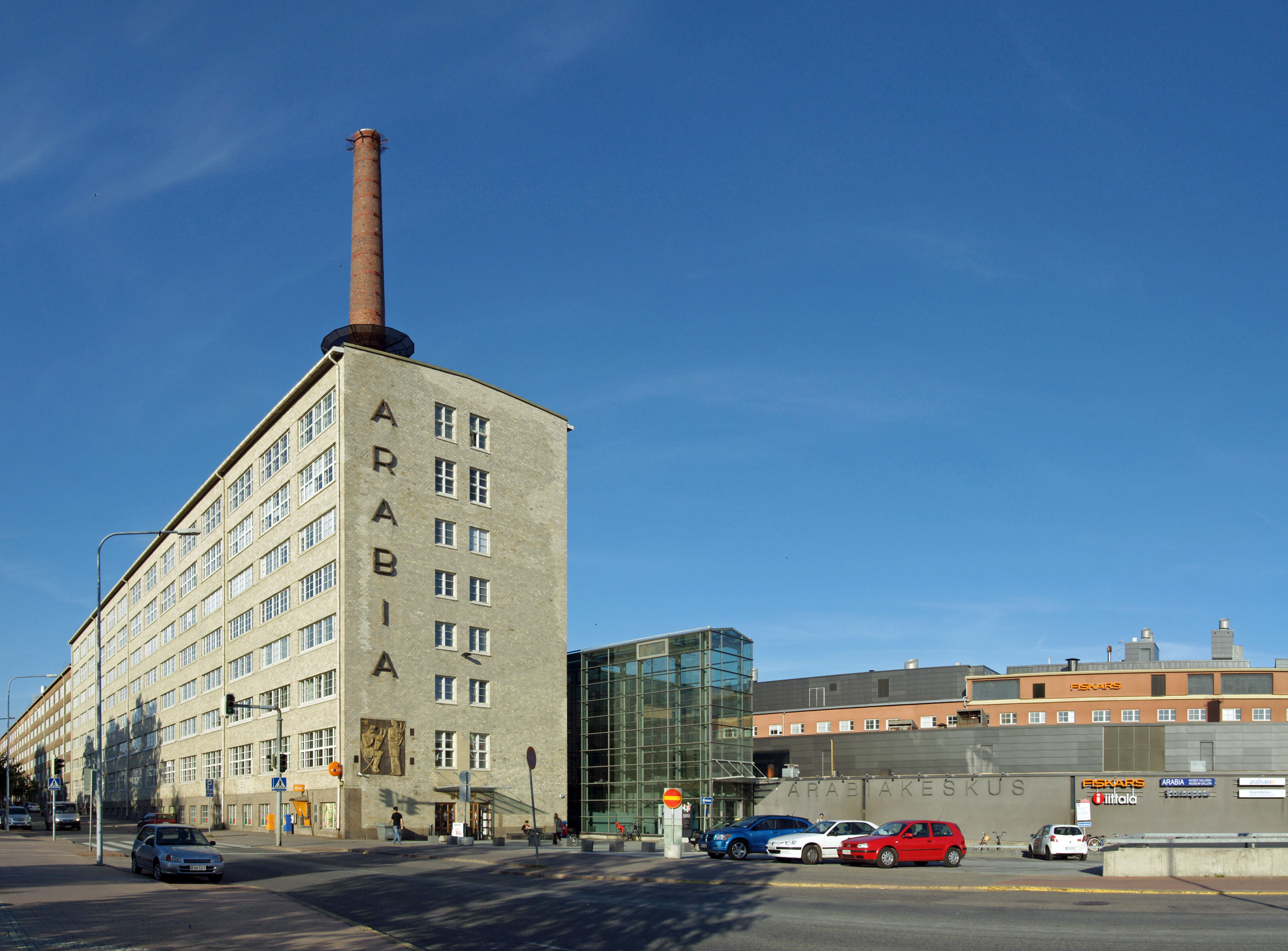
Arabia factory Building

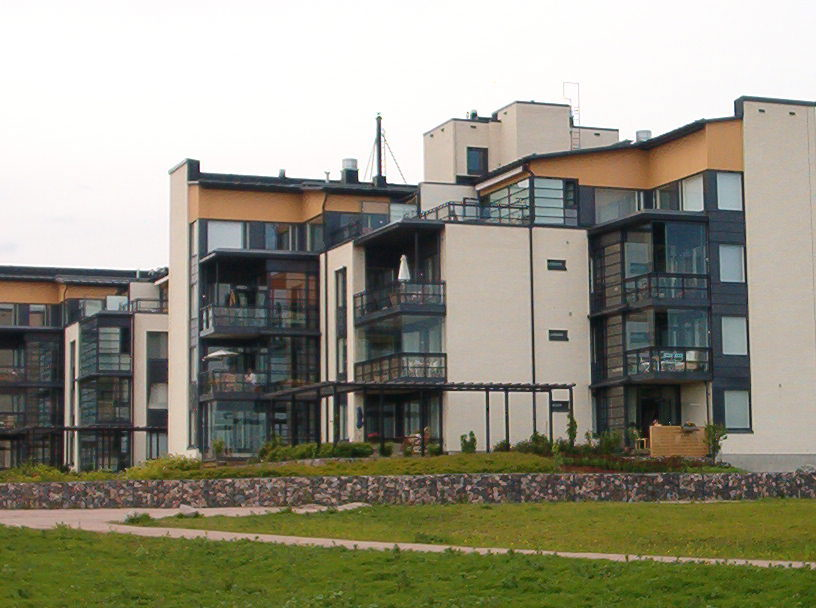
New houses in Arabianranta

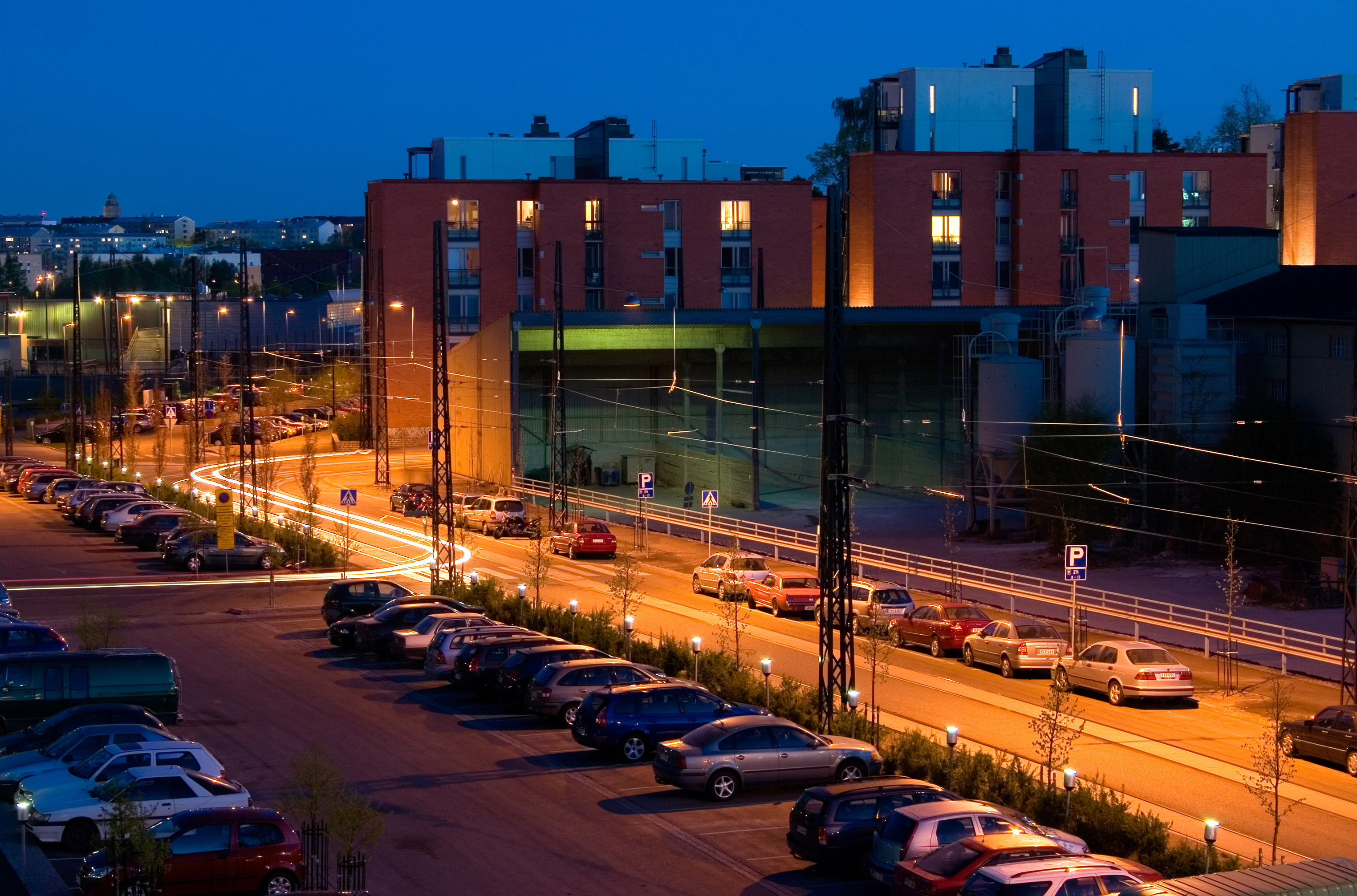
Arabianranta at night

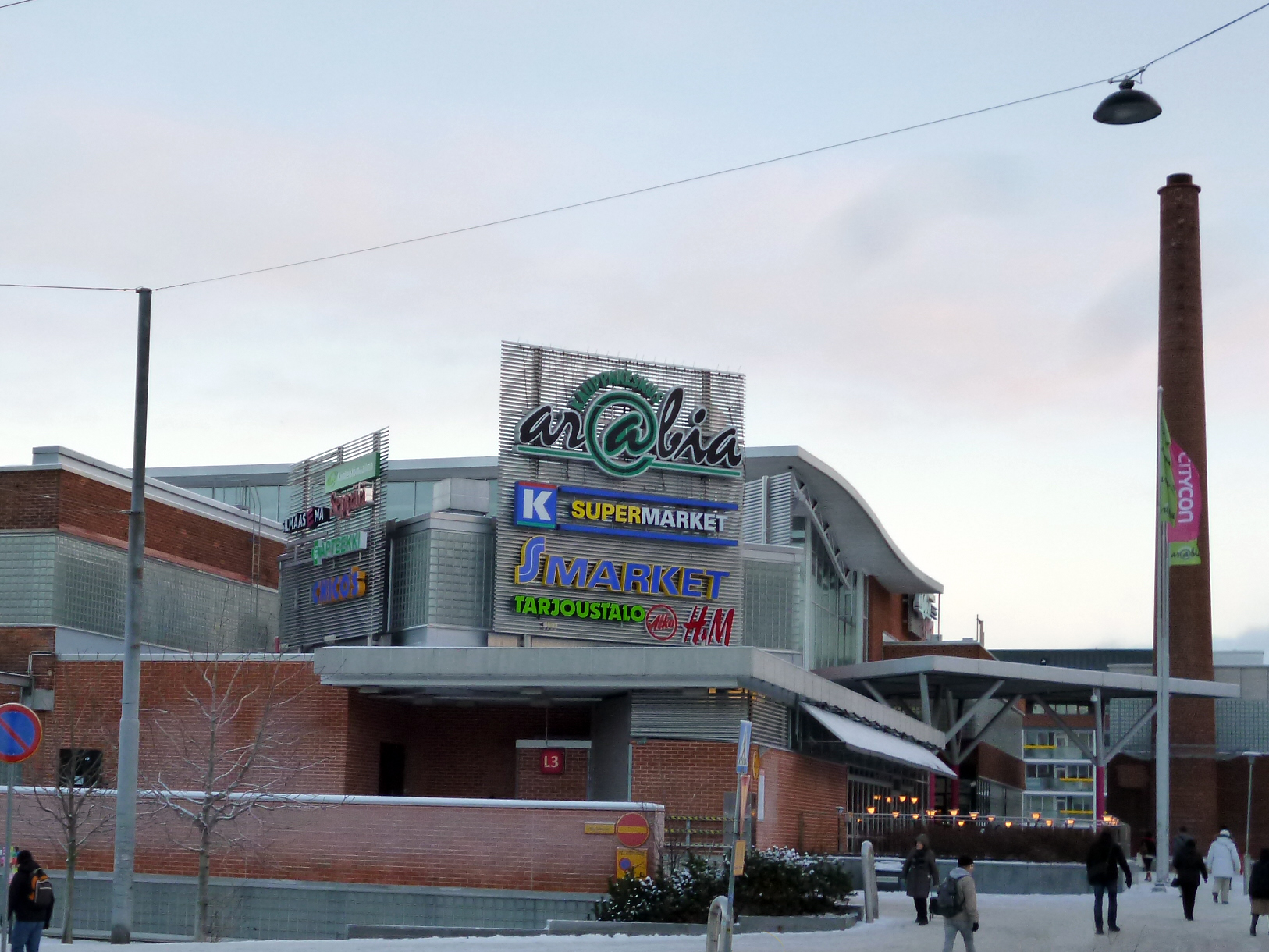
Arabia shopping centre

Arabianranta (Finnish: [ˈɑrɑbiɑnˌrɑntɑ]; Swedish: Arabiastranden; literally meaning the "shore of Arabia"), sometimes simply Arabia, is a residential part of Helsinki, Finland. It is bound by Vanhankaupunginlahti bay from east, and connects to neighboring boroughs of Vanhakaupunki in north, Hermanni in south and Toukola and Kumpula in west. It is part of the greater Toukola region.

The City of Helsinki requires all developers in the Arabianranta area to use 1-2% of the building investments of individual sites for works of art. This rule has been followed since the launching of development in the area 2000. Therefore, works of arts are visible around the district. Artists, designers and craftsmen put their stamp on buildings, objects and a communal spirit that gives energy.

The district is mainly divided into three hubs. The Hämeentie Factory District is the heart of the Arabia region where you can find an unbroken tradition of design. At the southern end of Arabia, there is the Toukolanranta (swe. Majstranden), which translates into English as May Beach. The present showcases of functional buildings were constructed in an area that was originally wasteland. Artist Johanna Hyrkäs has designed an art trail which combines the buildings and the art gardens. The district is easily accessible by bus and trams, it takes around 15 minutes to get to the city centre.

== History ==
The Swedish King Gustav Vasa founded Helsinki on the mouth of the Vantaa River in 1550. The Annala Gardens on the west side of Hämeentie was founded in the 1820s. A current Bokvilla Park (Bokvillan puisto), located on Arabianranta, is home to a notorious place known as Hirsipuunkallio ("Gallow Rock"), which is the oldest execution site in Helsinki; from the 16th century until at least the 18th century, many thieves were hanged and the killers (mostly child killers) decapitated.

One of the most important factories located in this neighbourhood is that of Arabia ceramics. This company was once the biggest ceramics factory in all of Europe. The building complex houses facilities for the Helsinki University of Art and Design as well as an interesting museum which is part of the Helsinki Design Museum. Although many people think that Arabianranta (the coast or shoreline of Arabia) derives its name from the famous Arabia ceramics and glassware factory, the name Arabia or rather "Arabian ja Kaanaan maa" (the land of Arabia and Canaan) is already found in documents dated back to the 18th century whereas the Arabia factory wasn't founded until the 1870s.

The modern buildings of Arabianranta have been built on the principle of art, where 1-2% of construction costs have been dedicated for art. In the Arabia region, the works of art reflect the history, nature and the unique tradition of Finnish design. The price of properties in this district of Helsinki are higher than average in Helsinki due to its proximity to nature and modern infrastructure. Arabianranta's residents have free internet (10 Mbit/s) due to the district's comprehensive fiber optic network for residential building in this area. The network has been assembled so that it is as reliable as electricity, water, heating and all the other basic services.

== Description ==
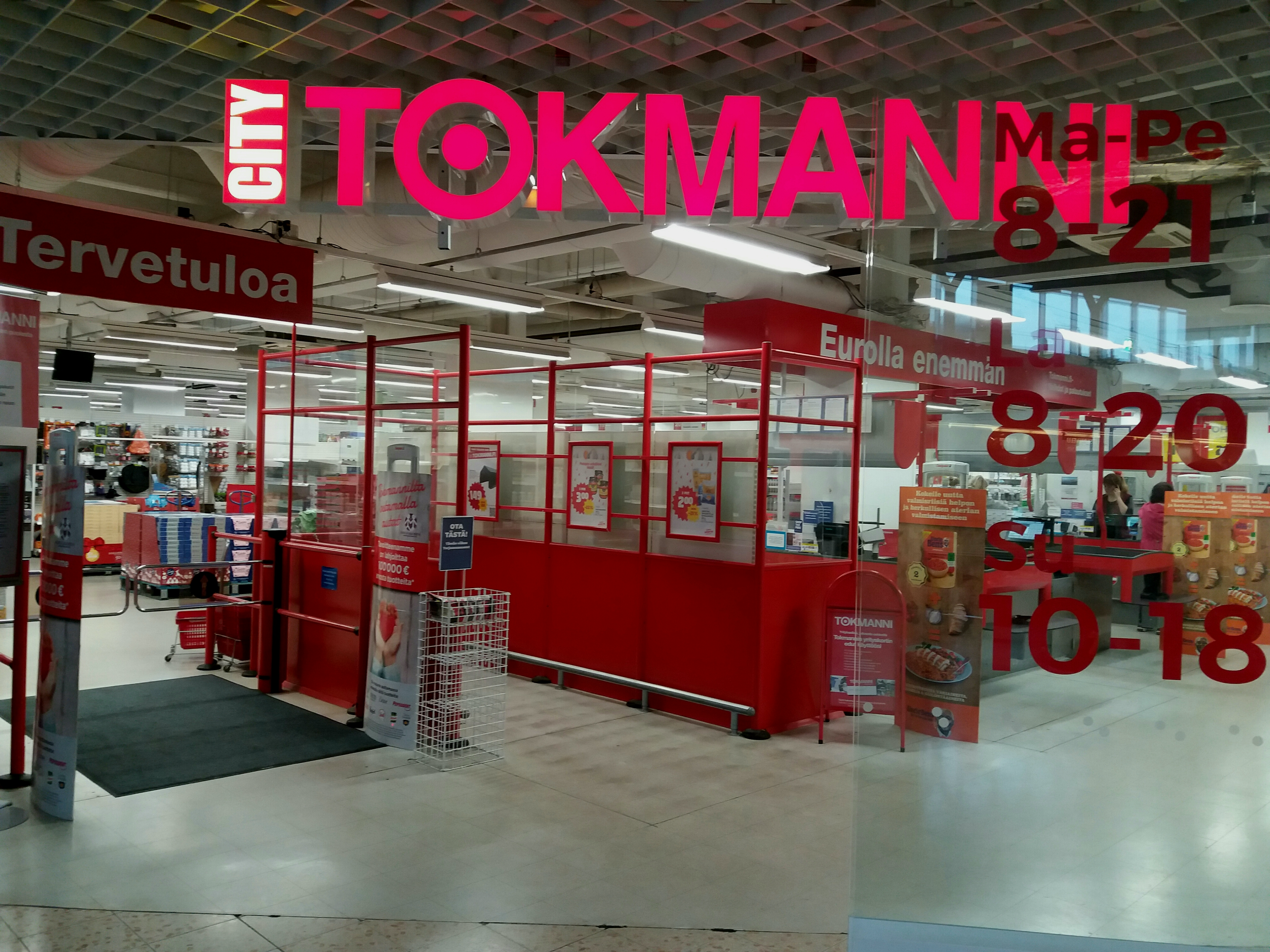
Tokmanni discount store in Arabianranta

Arabianranta is a home for 10,000 people, a workplace for 5,000 and a campus for 6,000 students and know-how professionals. As a residential district, Arabianranta is heterogenic, with different types of housing: modern loft buildings, city villas, and the Plus Koti (Plus Home) concept and homes for groups with special needs such as Loppukiri (community housing for active elderly people), Käpytikka (residence for mentally disabled juvenile) and MS-Talo (MS House) (for people with MS). The Arabianranta district has formed a "laboratory" for housing and since 2007 there has been testing for services and products called "Helsinki Living Lab" together with the residents. Besides the local information network, one of the most important services for the residents is the housing association's own web site, which is being updated by a named moderator from each association.

Arabianranta is a home to over 300 enterprises and 4,000 employees. In the field of creative industries, the businesses are normally small or medium-sized enterprises. After the educational institutes, the biggest private sector employers are the Iittala Group and Digia Oyj. The future objective is to attract more and more businesses in the field of creative industries to join the Arabianranta community and operate and develop together with the local educational institutes. The enterprises also find new business partners and customers via the association's web site.

The unified campus area of Arabianranta consists of 6 educational institutes, with 6,000 students and about 1,500 know-how professionals. The universities are the Aalto University School of Arts, Design and Architecture, Arcada University of Applied Sciences and Helsinki Metropolia University of Applied Sciences. The upper secondary vocational institutions are Swedish Prakticum and Finnish Heltech. In the Helsinki Pop & jazz Conservatory almost 1,000 students study rhythm music. Educational institutions and students can use and benefit from this platform in their own research projects, one example of this is Helsinki Living Lab project sponsored by TEKES.

=== Art and Design ===
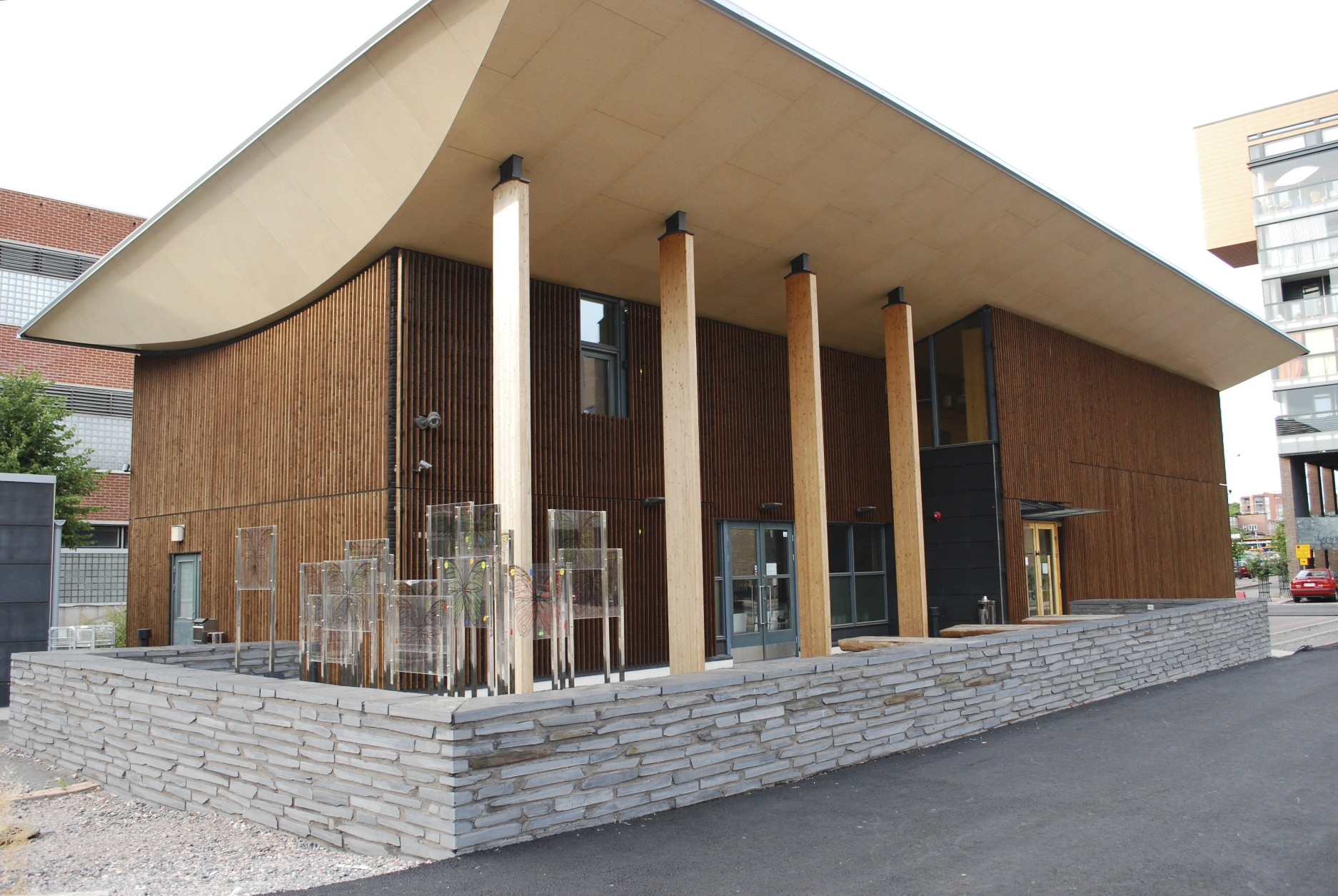
Cor-huset

The Art and Design City Helsinki Ltd was founded to manage the project and its role became to develop the information network structure and Helsinki Virtual Village services, also the basis for this particular site. "Art and Design" (unique artworks) can be seen in the built environment, in buildings, public yards and premises. The arts and culture are actively introduced to people of Arabianranta by educational institutes such as the performance art of Metropolia, The University of Art and Design and Helsinki Pop & Jazz Conservatory. The educational institutes offer The Masters of Arts Festival, which has become the biggest single event in the area.

Tapio Wirkkala Park, a park named after the designer Tapio Wirkkala, is in the centre of Arabianranta. The park, which was opened in 2012, was designed by the American theatre director and artist Robert Wilson.

Advanced and modern projects and experiments in apartment building design and business operations are typical for the Arabia district.

=== Facilities ===
==== Arabia Museum ====
The Arabia Museum is part of the Design Museum, Helsinki, with a comprehensive overview of the products and rich history of the Arabia factory. The gallery houses temporary exhibitions.

==== Museum of Technology ====
The Museum of Technology is situated on the historic Kuninkaankartanonsaari and it is the only museum that is specialized in general technology in Finland. The Museum of Technology is located on the premises of the former water works. The museum stores, studies and explains through the medium of seasonal exhibitions the story of the diverse techniques, innovations and developments of industrial production in Finland as well as their impact on society and people's daily lives.

==== The Power Station Museum ====
The Power Station Museum is situated on the west bank of the Old Town Rapids and includes the former turbine pumping station, water works and steam power station. The Power Station Museum still produces so-called environmental penny power for urban use. Together the Power Station Museum and the Museum of Technology form a unique historical industrial surrounding.
