= Social security in Germany =

Includes all statutory insurance in Germany

Social security in Germany is a system of social insurance and public benefits that provides financial protection against risks such as illness, unemployment, old age, long-term care needs and workplace accidents. It also includes support for families, people with disabilities and people who cannot adequately support themselves.

The core of the system is statutory social insurance, which covers health insurance, long-term care insurance, pension insurance, unemployment insurance and accident insurance. Other forms of social protection include social assistance, housing benefits, family benefits, rehabilitation and social compensation. Much of the system is governed by the Sozialgesetzbuch (SGB; Social Code), which sets out the main legal framework for social benefits and social insurance in Germany.

== Unemployment ==
=== Unemployment benefit I ===
The unemployment benefit I in Germany is also known as the unemployment insurance. The insurance is administered by the Bundesagentur für Arbeit (Federal Employment Agency, BA) and funded by employee and employer contributions. This in stark contrast to FUTA in the US and other systems; where only employers make contributions. Participation (and thus contributions) are generally mandatory for both employee and employer. All workers with a regular employment contract, except freelancers and certain civil servants, contribute to the system. Since 2006, certain previously excluded workers have been able to opt into the system on a voluntary basis.

The system is financed by contributions from both employees and employers. Each party pays a contribution of 1.3% of the employee's gross salary. These contributions are capped at the social security contribution ceiling (Beitragsbemessungsgrenze), which is 8,450 EUR per month as of 2026. The system is largely self-financed, with additional state subsidies provided to support the operation of the Jobcenters.

Unemployed workers are entitled to:

- Living allowance known as unemployment benefit
- Help in finding work
- Training

Unemployment benefit is paid to workers who have contributed for at least 12 months within a 30-month period preceding the loss of their job. The allowance is generally paid for 12 months; for claimants aged 50 and older, the duration increases incrementally up to 24 months for those aged 58 and older, provided they have contributed for at least 48 months. Beneficiaries receive 60% of their previous net salary and 67% if they have children, capped at the social security contribution ceiling. As of 2026, the maximum monthly benefit amount is 3,039.90 EUR (60%) or 3,393.90 EUR (67% for claimants with children).

=== Unemployment benefit II ===
If a worker is not eligible for unemployment insurance benefits or after receiving them for the maximum duration, they can apply for the Grundsicherung für Arbeitsuchende (basic income support). Recipients receive a monthly standard allowance (Regelsatz) of 563 EUR as of 2026 to cover living expenses, plus the cost of adequate housing and heating. The system ensures a socio-cultural subsistence level and is administered via the local Jobcenters. Benefits are disbursed via direct bank transfer.

== Health insurance ==
Germany has a universal multi-payer health care system with two main types of health insurance: "Statutory Health Insurance" (Gesetzliche Krankenversicherung) known as sickness funds (Krankenkasse) and "Private Health Insurance" (Private Krankenversicherung).

Health insurance is compulsory for the whole population in Germany. Salaried workers and employees below the relatively high income threshold of more than 60,000 euros per year are automatically enrolled into one of currently around 93 public non-profit "sickness funds" at common rates for all members, and is paid for with joint employer-employee contributions. Provider payment is negotiated in complex corporatist social bargaining among specified self-governed bodies (e.g. physicians' associations) at the level of federal states (Länder). The sickness funds are mandated to provide a unique and broad benefit package and cannot refuse membership or otherwise discriminate on an actuarial basis. Social welfare beneficiaries are also enrolled in statutory health insurance, and municipalities pay contributions on behalf of them.

Besides the "Statutory Health Insurance" (Gesetzliche Krankenversicherung) covering the vast majority of residents, the better off with a yearly income above almost €50,000 (US$59,135), students and civil servants for complementary coverage can opt for private health insurance (about 11% of the population). Most civil servants benefit from a tax-funded government employee benefit scheme covering a percentage of the costs, and cover the rest of the costs with a private insurance contract. Recently, private insurers provide various types of supplementary coverage as an add upon of the SHI benefit package (e.g. for glasses, coverage abroad and additional dental care or more sophisticated dentures).

The health economics of Germany sector was about US$368.78 billion (€287.3 billion) in 2010, equivalent to 11.6 percent of gross domestic product (GDP) this year and about US$4,505 (€3,510) per capita. According to the World Health Organization, Germany's health care system was 77% government-funded and 23% privately funded as of 2004. In 2004 Germany ranked thirtieth in the world in life expectancy (78 years for men). It had a very low infant mortality rate (4.7 per 1,000 live births), and it was tied for eighth place in the number of practicing physicians, at 3.3 per 1,000 persons. In 2001 total spending on health amounted to 10.8 percent of gross domestic product.

== Child support ==
The child care system in Germany can be seen as universal in coverage, though regulations may vary from Land to Land, and between west Germany and east Germany. It is viewed as a public problem shared by multiple roles of the society: parents, regional and local governments, non-profit organizations (usually churches) etc. Germany offers a wide range of child care programs for parents: day care centers (Krippe) for children up to age 3, preschool programs (Kindergarten) for children from age 3 to 6, primary schools (Hort) for school-age children. Around ninety-eight per cent of German daycare is non-for-profit and is heavily funded by the government. Ninety per cent of the costs are paid by state, regional and local governments through public taxes while the rest of the cost is paid by the parents. In western Germany, regulations of day care are enforced by state youth office (Landesjugendamt) in each Land, which distributes funds to day care centers according to a certain amount. Even though the enforcement is in a relatively decentralized form, there is still high conformity on regulatory requirements of the day care centers among different Land. For example, child/staff ratios vary from 17/1 to 25/1; group sizes of 25 in kindergartens; and training requirements for teachers. German child care system values highly of the quality of teaching staffs. In every German Land, a teacher must complete four to five years of training requirements, usually composed of one to two years of praktikum, two years of college, and one year of additional praktikum (Berufspraktikum). The tougher regulation on teachers' training requirements ensures the quality of child care service to some extent. There is no big market for private day care in Germany. Only 4% to 10% of mothers employ child minders (Tagespflege) in 1995. The main reason for this is that private child care providers cannot maintain profitability when facing the competition from the public providers which are generously funded by the government. And the high barrier to enter the market set by the government becomes one of the hinders.

Although general condition of the child care system can be applied to most of the cases and regions in Germany, there are noticeably big regional differences, especially between west and east Germany. The regional variations in child care supply reflect the fact that regulations are being made at the local community level. According to Tietze, Rossbach & Roitsch survey in 1994, there are variations in the supply of day care services between rural and urban areas, with rural areas being at a disadvantage. In east Germany, there are much larger number of day care slots than in west Germany and higher rate of child care provision, as an inheritance from its former socialist German Democratic Republic. The opening hours of the day-care centers vary as well. In west Germany the opening hours of Kindergarten are short, only for half of the day; while in east Germany 97% of the kindergarten offers all-day care including lunch. Child care policies in Germany focus more on children's development and equal opportunities to succeed after kindergarten rather than focusing on helping to solve the compatibility of work and family for parents. Thus it explains the fact that Germany aims to provide high-quality early education for children but set the opening hours of day care centers to be short and not convenient to the working parents.

In many social studies, child care policy together with social norms about gender roles have cast big impact on women's participation in labor force and fertility choice. Having one of the lowest fertility rate among European countries, Germany has on average 1.38 children per woman in 2008 and it keeps on having high level of childlessness among parents. Women in Germany, as in many other countries, face the dilemma between work and family. In west Germany, female participation in labor market is low as German income tax system discourages women from labor market due to high unemployment rate. Even for women who have jobs, they usually stop working at the birth of the child because mothers are seen as the best child care providers. 3-year period of parental leave is provided by the government, with low cash benefits paid under the terms of health insurance. Women tend to stay as housewives when kids are young and return to part-time works after their children grow older. Full-time employment rates are even lower. In east Germany, however, it witnesses one of the highest female labor participation rate among European countries. As high as 85 per cent of adult women, including those with young kids, participate in labor market. For working mothers, there are several informal child care arrangements they could have. Usually they have their children to be cared for by grandparents or other close relatives. Others send their kids to day care centers. 60% of east German children under age 3 are cared for by the day centers and over 90% of children aged 3 to 6 attend full-day preschool program.

Apart from maternity leave, parents are also entitled to a paid leave if their children are ill at home.

== Financing ==
Germany's social insurance system is financed mainly through contributions paid by employees and employers. Most contributions are calculated as a percentage of gross earnings, up to an annual contribution ceiling (Beitragsbemessungsgrenze).

Insurance	Contribution rate	Financing	Contribution ceiling (2026)
Pension	18.6%	Shared equally by employer and employee	€101,400 per year
Unemployment	2.6%	Shared equally	€101,400 per year
Health	14.6% plus an additional contribution set by each health insurance fund	Shared equally	€69,750 per year
Long-term care	3.6% standard rate	Generally shared between employer and employee	€69,750 per year
Accident	Varies according to industry and occupational risk	Paid by employers	—

The contribution rates for pension and unemployment insurance are 18.6% and 2.6%, respectively. Statutory health insurance has a general contribution rate of 14.6%, in addition to a supplementary contribution determined by each insurance fund.

Long-term care insurance has a standard contribution rate of 3.6%. Childless members pay an additional surcharge, while members with several children may pay a reduced employee contribution. Statutory accident insurance is financed entirely by employers, with contributions depending on factors such as payroll and occupational risk.
