= Modern Arabic =

Modern Arabic may refer to:

- Modern Standard Arabic
- living varieties of Arabic

== See also ==
- Literary Arabic (disambiguation)
- Arabic (disambiguation)
