= Arabistan =

Arabistan or Arabestan may refer to:

- Khuzestan, a province of Iran that was also known as Arabistan
- Arbayistan, a province of the Sasanian Empire in Upper Mesopotamia
- Saudi Arabia in the Persian and Turkish languages
- the Arabian Peninsula
- an autonomous province in the Ottoman Empire ruled by Fakhr al-Din II

== See also ==
- Arab (disambiguation)
- Arabia (disambiguation)
- Arabian (disambiguation)
