= Arabian (disambiguation) =

Arabian or Arabians may refer to:

- Someone or something related to the Arabian Peninsula
- Someone or something related to the Arab world

== Other ==
- Armand Arabian (1934-2018), American judge
- Arabian (video game)
- Arabian Business magazine
- Arabian Coast
- Arabian Desert
- Arabian horse
- Arabian mythology
- Arabian Nights, or One Thousand and One Nights
- Arabian oryx
- Arabian Sea
- James McCaulley (tug), also known as Arabian, a commercial tug chartered by the Navy in service from November 1918 to January 1919

== See also ==
- Arab (disambiguation)
- Arabia (disambiguation)
- Saudi Arabians
