= Literary Arabic =

Literary Arabic (Arabic: (al-)fuṣḥá الفصحى) may refer to:

- Classical Arabic
- Modern Standard Arabic

== See also ==
- Modern Arabic (disambiguation)
