= SS Arabic =

SS Arabic may refer to:

- SS Arabic (1881)
- SS Arabic (1902), an ocean liner sunk by German submarine U-24 on 19 August 1915
- SS Arabic (1920), the former SS Berlin; renamed Arabic in 1920; broken up in 1930

== See also ==
- Arabic (disambiguation)
