= Tapio Wirkkala Park =

Park in Helsinki, Finland

- Location within Helsinki (mainland)
- Type: Urban park
- Location: Arabianranta, Helsinki, Finland
- Coordinates: 60°12′26.64″N 24°58′42.24″E
- Area: 2.361 m^{2} (25.41 sq ft)
- Established: October 22, 2012; 13 years ago
- Designer: Robert Wilson
- Owner: Helsinki Art Museum

Tapio Wirkkala Park (Finnish: Tapio Wirkkalan puisto; Swedish: Tapio Wirkkalas konstpark) is an art park consisting of sculptures located in the Arabianranta quarter in Helsinki, Finland. The park is named after Finnish designer Tapio Wirkkala (1915–1985) and was designed by American artist Robert Wilson (1941–2025). The park was opened on October 22, 2012 and is one of the City of Helsinki's own World Design Capital Helsinki 2012 projects.

Planning for the park began in 2004 and construction work was originally supposed to begin in 2010, but construction only began in November 2011. The park's estimated cost is approximately €1.2 million.
