= Kalateh-ye Arabha =

Kalateh-ye Arabha كلاته عربها
- Village
- Location within Iran
- Coordinates: 36°42′41″N 59°44′17″E
- Country: Iran
- Province: Razavi Khorasan
- County: Mashhad
- Bakhsh: Central
- Rural District: Kardeh

Population (2006)
  - Total: 311
- Time zone: UTC+3:30 (IRST)
  - Summer (DST): UTC+4:30 (IRDT)

Kalateh-ye Arabha (Persian: كلاته عربها, also Romanized as Kalāteh-ye ‘Arabhā; also known as Kalāteh-ye ‘Arab) is a village in Kardeh Rural District, in the Central District of Mashhad County, Razavi Khorasan Province, Iran. At the 2006 census, its population was 311, in 78 families.
