= The Arab (magazine) =

The Arab is an online English language magazine on Middle Eastern and North African current affairs, established as a print publication in 2007 and as an online only magazine in early 2009.

It focuses on a broad range of subject areas within the Arab world, from alternative viewpoints. Articles are serious and authoritative in their approach, and aimed at readers with at least some familiarity with the region.

Its primary focus is politics and social affairs, but it also covers culture and business. Although it is concerned with Muslim-majority countries, it is not a Muslim magazine i.e. it does not publish articles from an Islamic perspective. The Arab covers religious issues in the region from a secular angle. The Arab is owned by an independent British publishing house of the same name, based in London. It markets itself, however, as an international magazine on pan-Arab affairs.
