= Arab, Iran =

Arab عرب
- Village
- Location within Iran
- Coordinates: 37°30′33″N 57°06′21″E
- Country: Iran
- Province: North Khorasan
- County: Bojnord
- Bakhsh: Central
- Rural District: Badranlu

Population (2006)
  - Total: 172
- Time zone: UTC+3:30 (IRST)
  - Summer (DST): UTC+4:30 (IRDT)

Arab (Persian: عرب, also Romanized as ‘Arab) is a village in Badranlu Rural District, in the Central District of Bojnord County, North Khorasan Province, Iran. At the 2006 census, its population was 172, in 47 families.
