= Norden, Nebraska =

Unincorporated community in Nebraska, United States

- Census-designated place
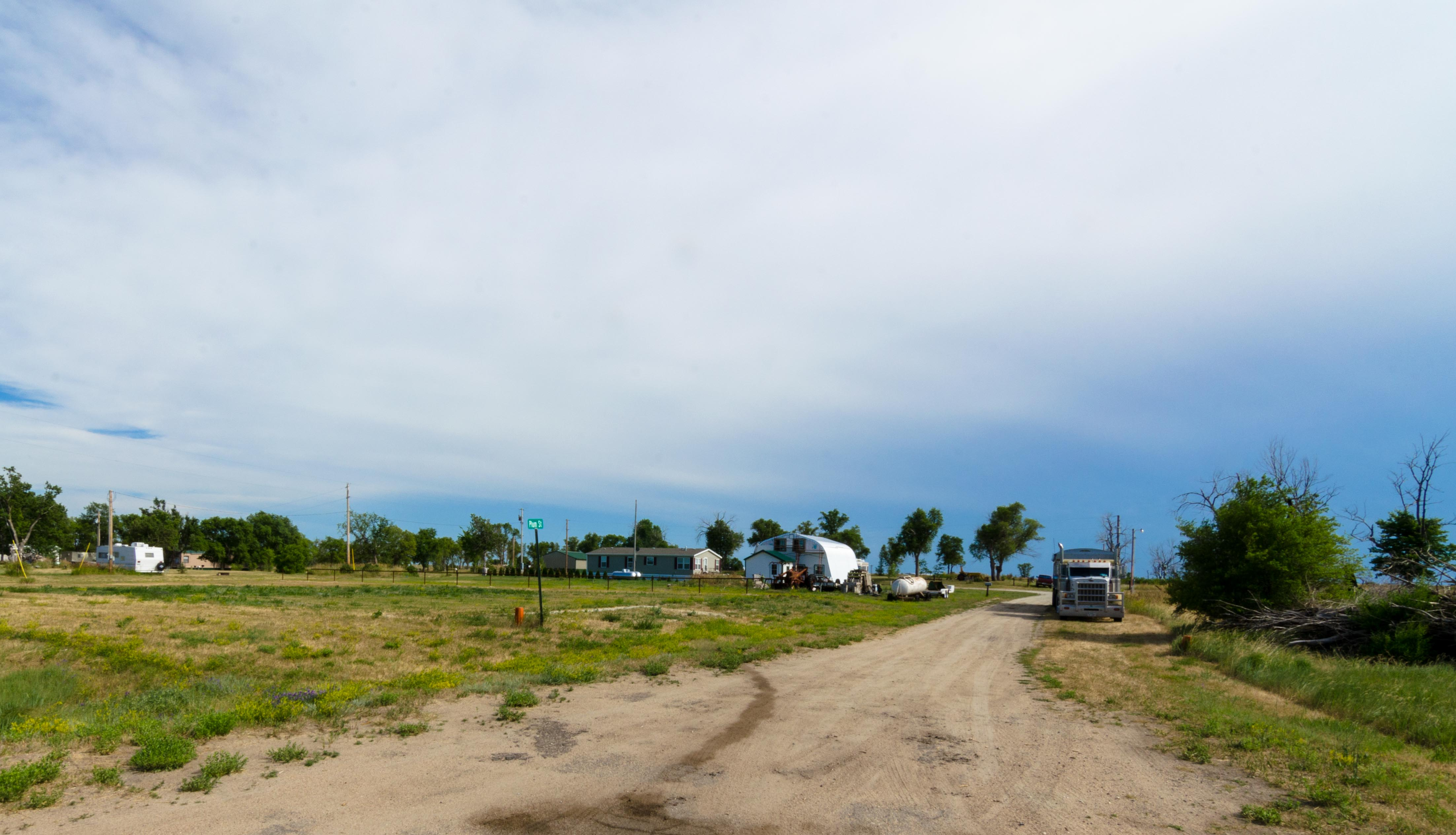
- A View of Norden From The Highway

- Location within the state of Nebraska
- Coordinates: 42°52′07″N 100°04′26″W
- Country: United States
- State: Nebraska
- County: Keya Paha
- Elevation: 2,559 ft (780 m)
- Time zone: UTC-6 (Central (CST))
  - Summer (DST): UTC-5 (CDT)
- ZIP code: 68778
- FIPS code: 31-34560
- GNIS feature ID: 835392

Norden is an unincorporated community in Keya Paha County, Nebraska, United States.

== History ==
An early settler being a native of Norden, Germany, caused the name to be selected.

A post office was established at Norden in 1884, and remained in operation until it was discontinued in 1960.

The Norden Dance Hall was built by hand from 1929 to 1931 — at the outset of the Great Depression. The hall stands as a gathering place where generations of families have socialized, bonded and danced. For example, the hall has hosted the town's annual barn dance for more than 120 years.

In June 2012, much of the town was burned by the Fairfield Creek Fire. One of the few structures to avoid the fire was the dance hall.
