= James McCaulley (tug) =

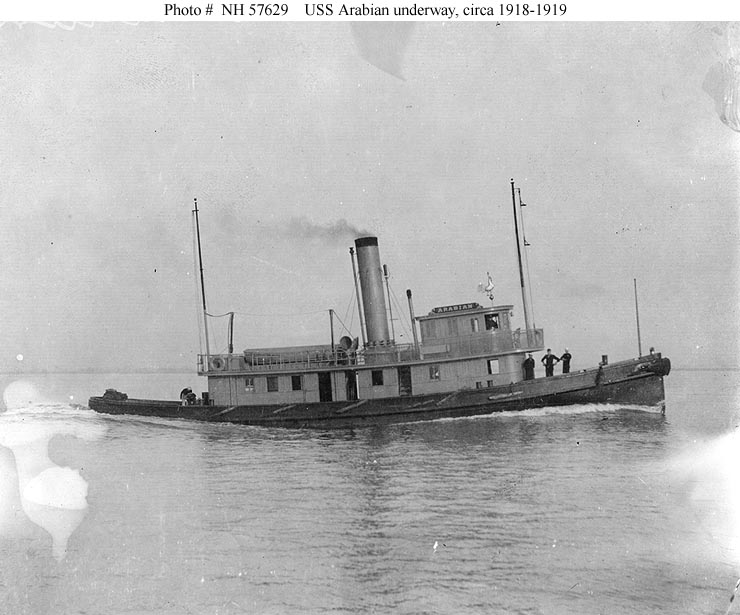
- Arabian with United States Navy personnel on board sometime between November 1918 and January 1919, probably in the Philadelphia, Pennsylvania, area.

History

United States
- Name: James McCaulley (1896-1918); Arabian (1918-1919)
- Namesake: Previous name retained
- Builder: John H. Dialogue & Sons, Camden, New Jersey
- Yard number: 278
- Completed: 1896
- Acquired: 29 October 1918
- In service: 5 November 1918
- Out of service: 31 January 1919
- Identification: U.S. Official Number: 76664
- Fate: Returned to owner 31 January 1919
- Notes: Operated as commercial tugboat James McCaulley 1896-1918 and in 1919. (O/N 76664, Arabian shows in the 1919 Merchant Vessels register. Neither the number nor name appear to be in the registry after 1919.)

General characteristics
- Type: Harbor tug
- Tonnage: 92 GRT, 46 U.S. Registered tons
- Length: 87 ft (27 m) (overall); 82 ft 8 in (25.2 m) (registered)
- Beam: 20 ft (6.1 m)
- Draft: 10 ft 6 in (3.20 m) aft
- Depth: 9 ft 5 in (2.9 m)
- Installed power: 1 boiler
- Propulsion: 1 vertical, compound Steam engine, 500 indicated H.P., one shaft
- Speed: 10 knots
- Complement: 7
- Armament: None

James McCaulley was a commercial tug based in Philadelphia that served under charter in the United States Navy from 5 November 1918 to 31 January 1919 as Arabian.

James McCaulley was built in 1896 as an iron hulled commercial steam tug, yard hull number 278, U.S. Official Number 76664, in 1896 by John H. Dialogue & Sons at Camden, New Jersey. The tug was registered with Philadelphia, Pennsylvania, as home port. On 30 October 1903 the tug and tow, the schooner Marie Palmer, were passing down Delaware Bay. The schooner Blanche Hopkins was headed up bay and just after 3 o’clock in the morning the schooners collided. The tug was found to be at fault for not giving way to a vessel under sail.

On 29 October 1918, the U.S. Navy acquired her under a bareboat charter, signed 3 November, from her owner, Mr. P. F. Martin of Philadelphia, for use during World War I. She never received a naval registry identification number, but was placed in service in the 4th Naval District as Arabian on 5 November 1918. Never being commissioned the tug was never authorized the prefix "United States Ship" (U.S.S.).

World War I ended on 11 November 1918, six days after Arabian was placed in service. No longer needed, she never received an assignment and apparently never saw active naval service. The Navy returned her to Martin on 31 January 1919.
