= Arabia (shopping centre) =

Shopping centre in Helsinki, Finland

Coordinates: 60°12′9.66″N 24°58′4.24″E

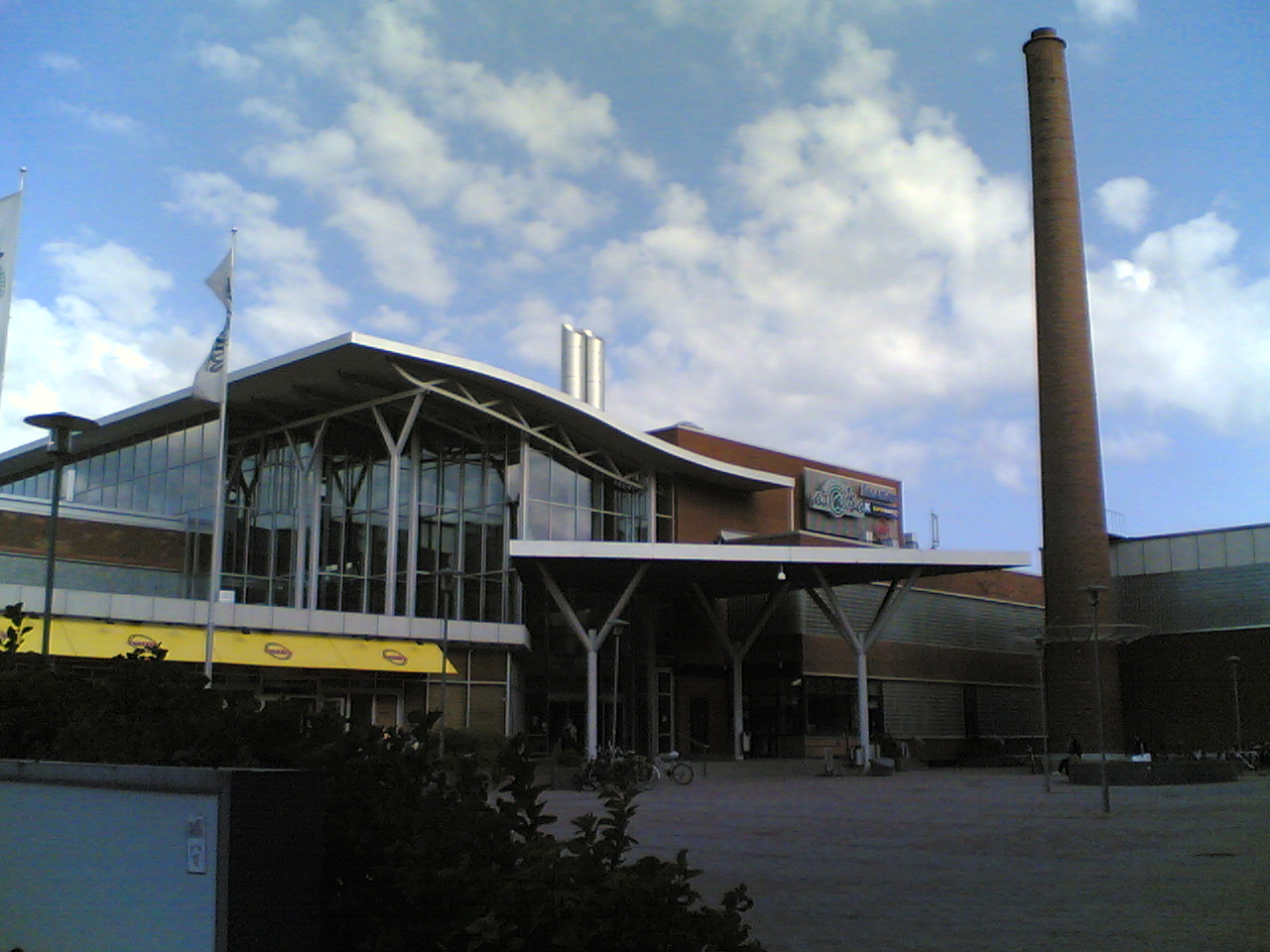
The main facade of the Arabia shopping centre

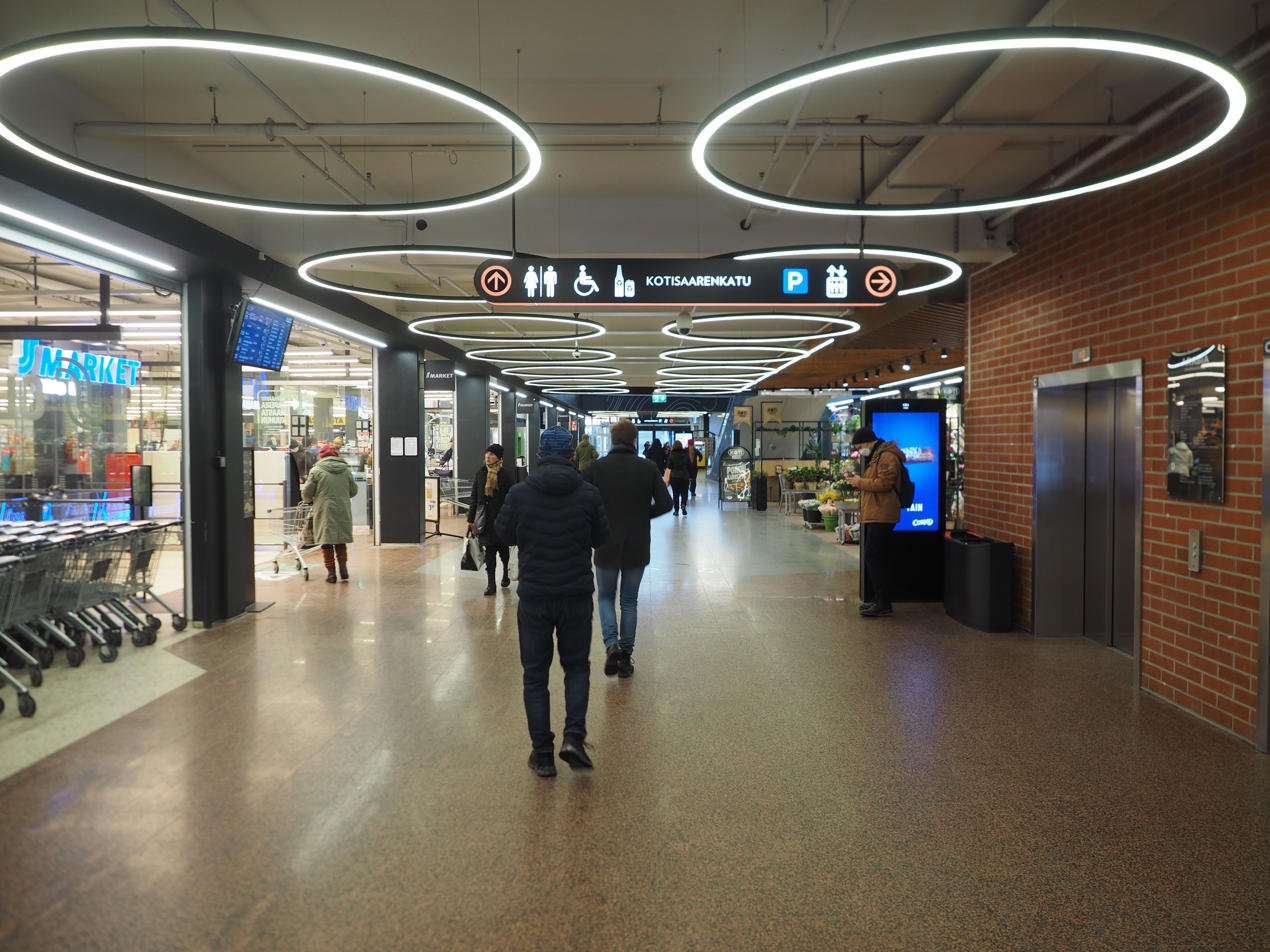
Interior of the Arabia shopping centre

Arabia is a shopping centre located in the Arabianranta district of Helsinki, Finland. From 2015 to 2019 it was owned by Citycon. In June 2019 Citycon sold the shopping centre to the Nordic building investor company NREP. The shopping centre was opened in 2002 in industrial buildings left empty by Kotisaari and Ingman.

The shopping centre has about 30 businesses, including K-Supermarket, S-market, Tokmanni, Alko, JYSK, Faunatar and a couple of restaurants. The first bakery café of the Cinnabon chain in Finland was located in the shopping centre until it closed down in spring 2016. Nowadays the site of the bakery café hosts a Kotipizza restaurant, opened in December 2016. The supermarket chain Lidl opened a store at the shopping centre on 11 January 2018. Pilatesstudio Arabia moved to the shopping centre in January 2019.

The Helsinki tram lines 6, 6T and 8 stop near the shopping centre, as do buses towards the city centre, northeastern Helsinki and Vantaa.
