= Ərəb, Lachin =

Ərəb
- Location within Azerbaijan Location within East Zangezur Economic Region
- Country: Azerbaijan
- District: Lachin
- Time zone: UTC+4 (AZT)
  - Summer (DST): AZT

Ərəb (Arab) is a village in the Lachin District of Azerbaijan.
