= Tapio Wirkkala =

Finnish designer and sculptor (1915–1985)

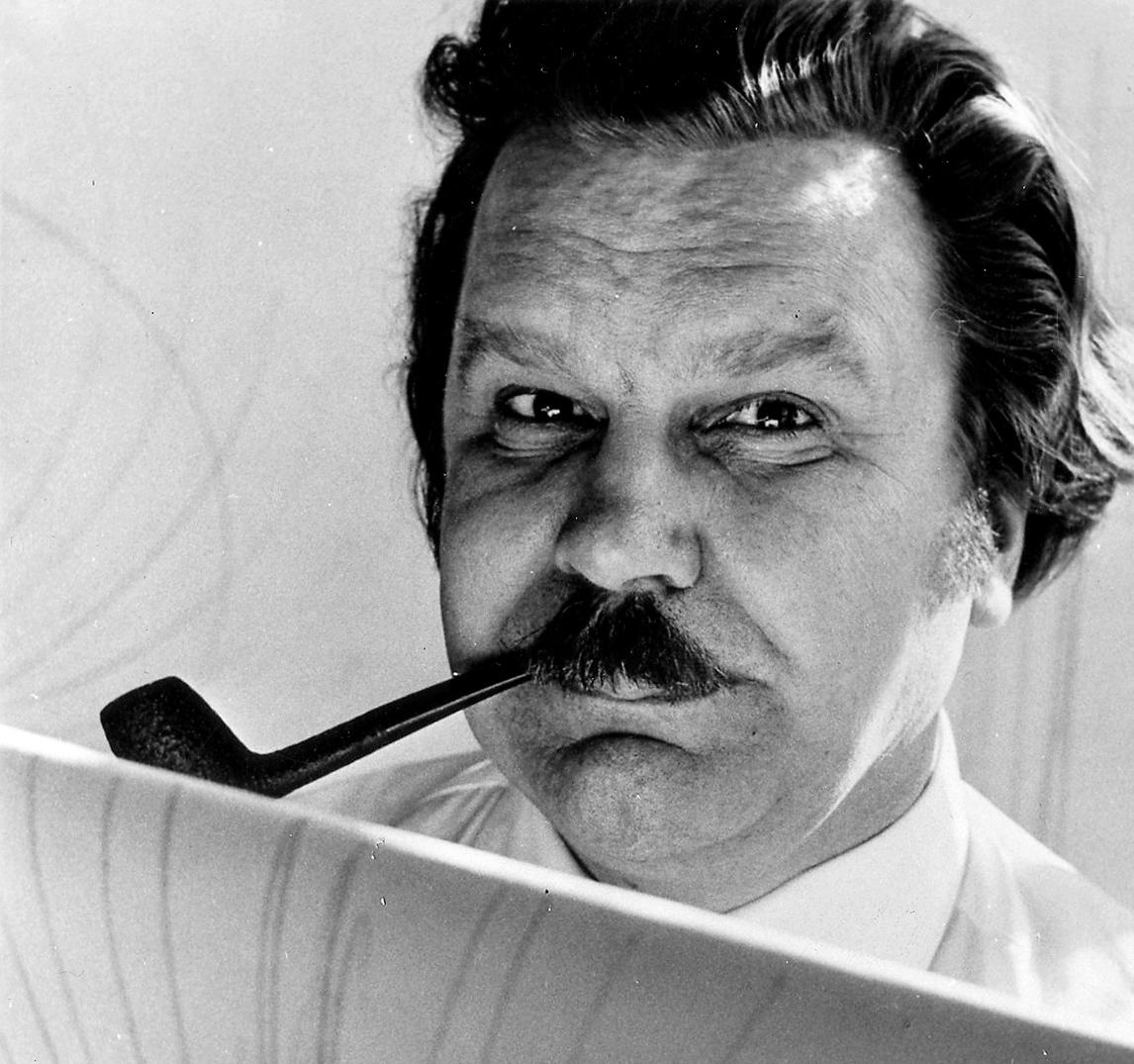
- Wirkkala in c.1959
- Born: 2 June 1915; Hanko, Finland
- Died: 19 May 1985 (aged 69); Helsinki, Finland
- Spouse: Rut Bryk

Tapio Veli Ilmari Wirkkala (2 June 1915 – 19 May 1985) was a Finnish designer and sculptor, a major figure of post-war design.

== Life and work ==
Wirkkala was born in Hanko in 1915. He attended the Töölö co-educational school in Helsinki. His father, Ilmari Wirkkala, was a cemetery architect, and mother Selma (née Vanhatalo) a wood-carver. His sister Helena Korvenkontio and brother Tauno Wirkkala were also artists.

Wirkkala's work ranges from designs of plastic ketchup bottles and metalware to glass, ceramics and plywood in a range of styles. His success as a glass designer began in 1946 when he designed the Kantarelli vase for Iittala, and the mass-produced Tapio collection was launched in 1954. His range was immense, including glassware, stoneware, jewellery, and furniture for mass production, as well as individual sculptures in several media. He designed commemorative postage stamps for the 1952 Helsinki Olympics, and also designed the Finnish markka banknotes introduced in 1955. In the early 1950s, Wirkkala worked as the artistic director at the Helsinki Central School of Industrial Design. The WIR lightbulb designed by Wirkkala for Airam Electric was awarded the Grand Prix at the XII Milan Triennial in 1960.

Among his most famous work have been the designs for the Finlandia vodka bottle (1970–1999) and for Iittala's Ultima Thule set of kitchen glasses. Both glassware items feature a dripping icicle look, and in the case of the Iittala's glassware it is said to have taken thousands of hours to develop a glassblowing technique that would produce the effect.

Wirkkala did much of his initial design work using a traditional Finnish carving knife, the puukko. Wirkkala designed his own version of the knife, the Tapio Wirkkala Puukko, which was manufactured by Hackman Cutlery and marketed by Brookstone in the US in the early-1970s.

== Death ==
Wirkkala died in Helsinki on 19 May 1985 and was buried in the artists' area of the Hietaniemi Cemetery; his wife, Rut Bryk, was later buried next to him. In 2009, the Wirkkala Academy was planned to be added to the Espoo Museum of Modern Art (EMMA) to exhibit his sculptural work.

== Awards and distinctions ==
- 1st and 2nd place, Bill Designing Competition of Bank of Finland 1947
- 4 awards, Designing Olympic Stamps 1951, for the 1952 Summer Olympics
- 3 Grand Prix at the 9th Milan Triennuial, 1951
- 3 Grand Prix, at the 10th Milan Triennuial, 1954
- Lunning Prize 1951
- Order of the Lion of Finland -medal 1955
- 1st place, the World Fair in Brussels 1957
- Society of Industrial Artists Medal of the Year 1958
- Grand Prix and Gold Medal, Milan 1960; Silver Medal, Milan 1963
- Domus Golden Obelisk, Milan 1963
- Gold Medal of the President of Italy, Faenza International Ceramics Competition 1963, 1966, 1967, 1969 and 1973
- Premio Internazionale Vicenza 1963, 1966 and 1967
- Honorary Royal Designer of Industry, London 1964
- Honorary Prize, the Finnish Cultural Foundation 1968
- Honorary doctorate, Royal College of Arts, London 1971
- Honorary Member of the Worshipful Company of Goldsmiths, London 1971
- Academy of Finland's honorary title of academician 1972
- Teosto organization's medal for Creative Work 1980
- Prince Eugen Medal, Stockholm 1980

== Gallery ==
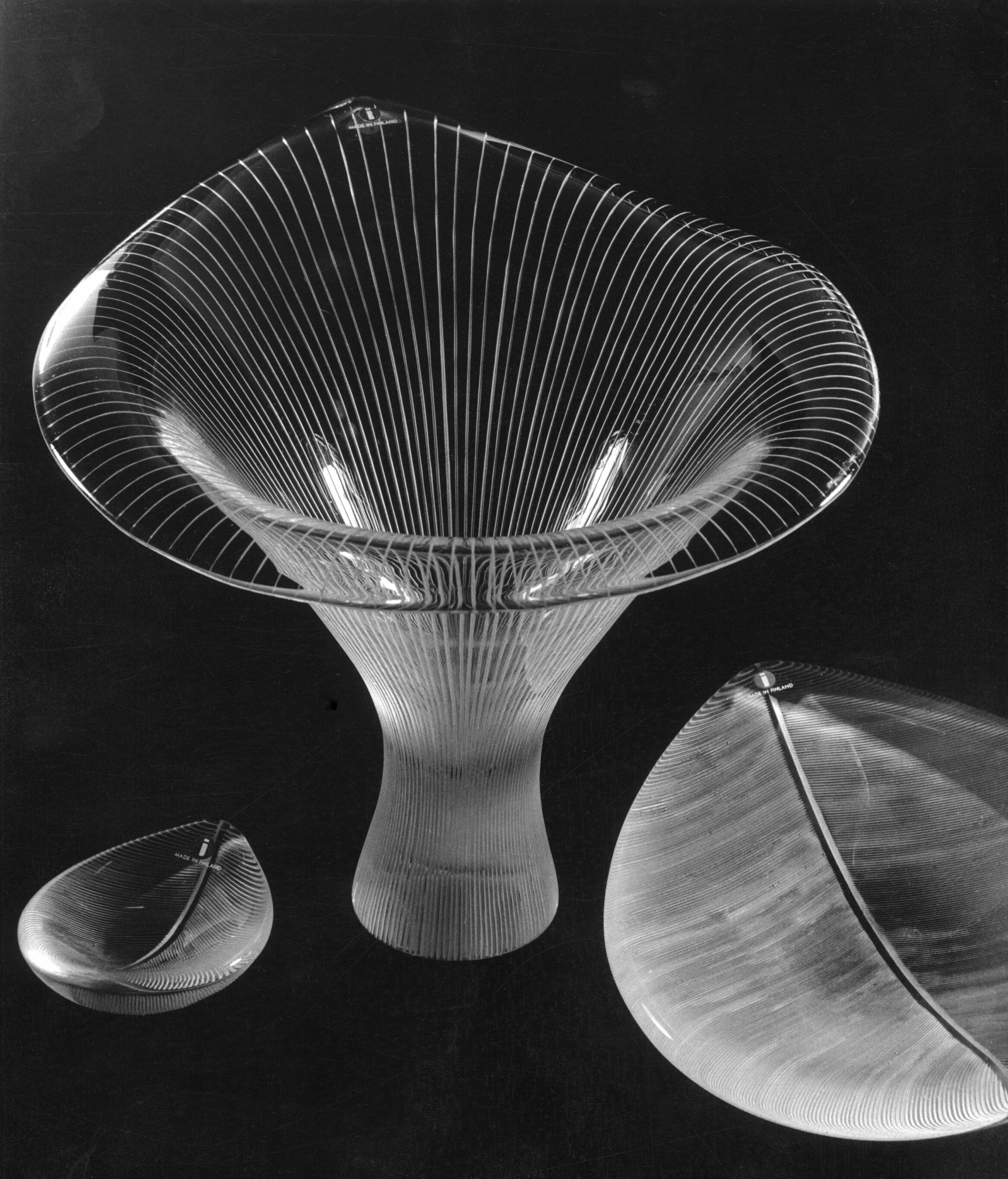
Kanttarelli vase (1946)

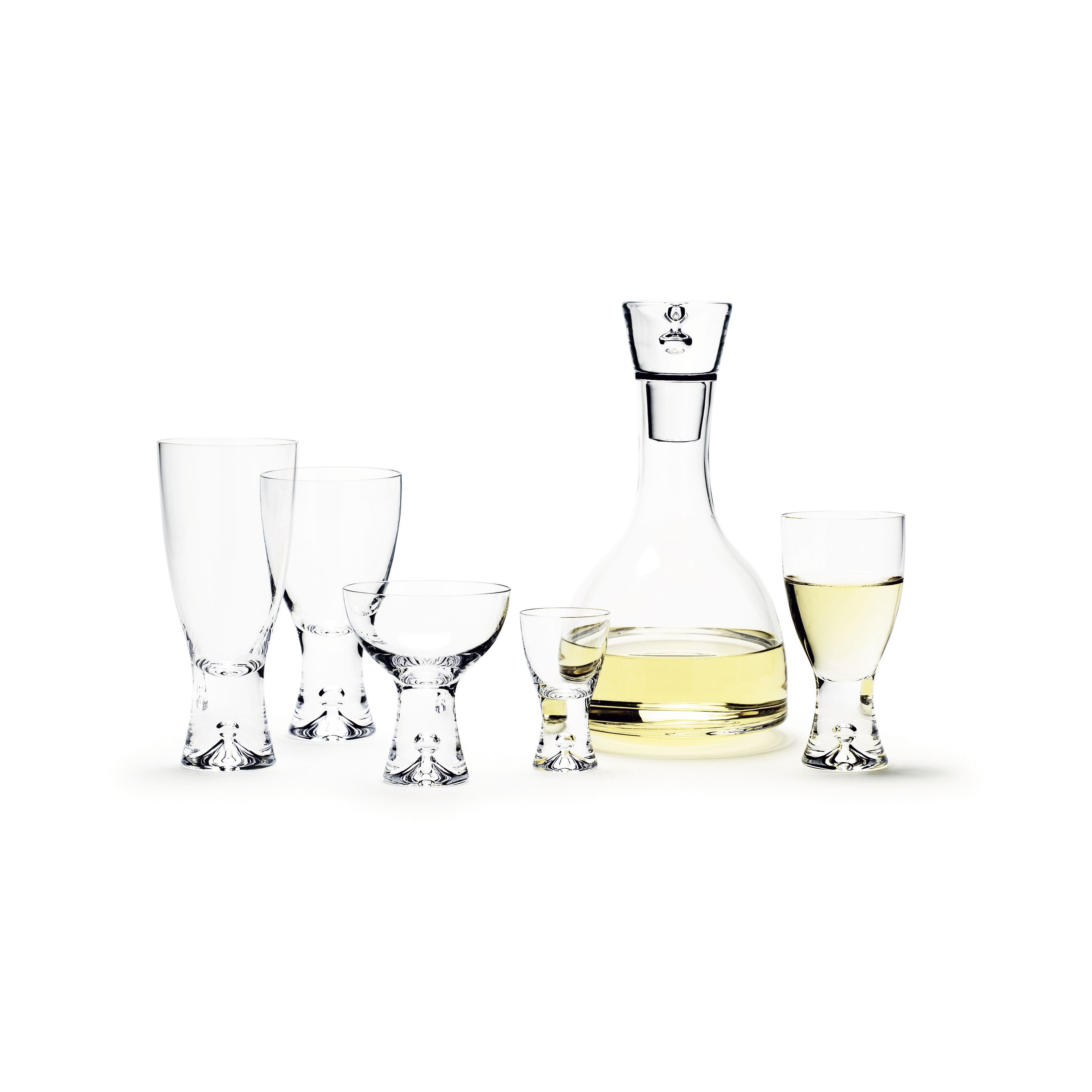
Tapio glassware (1952)

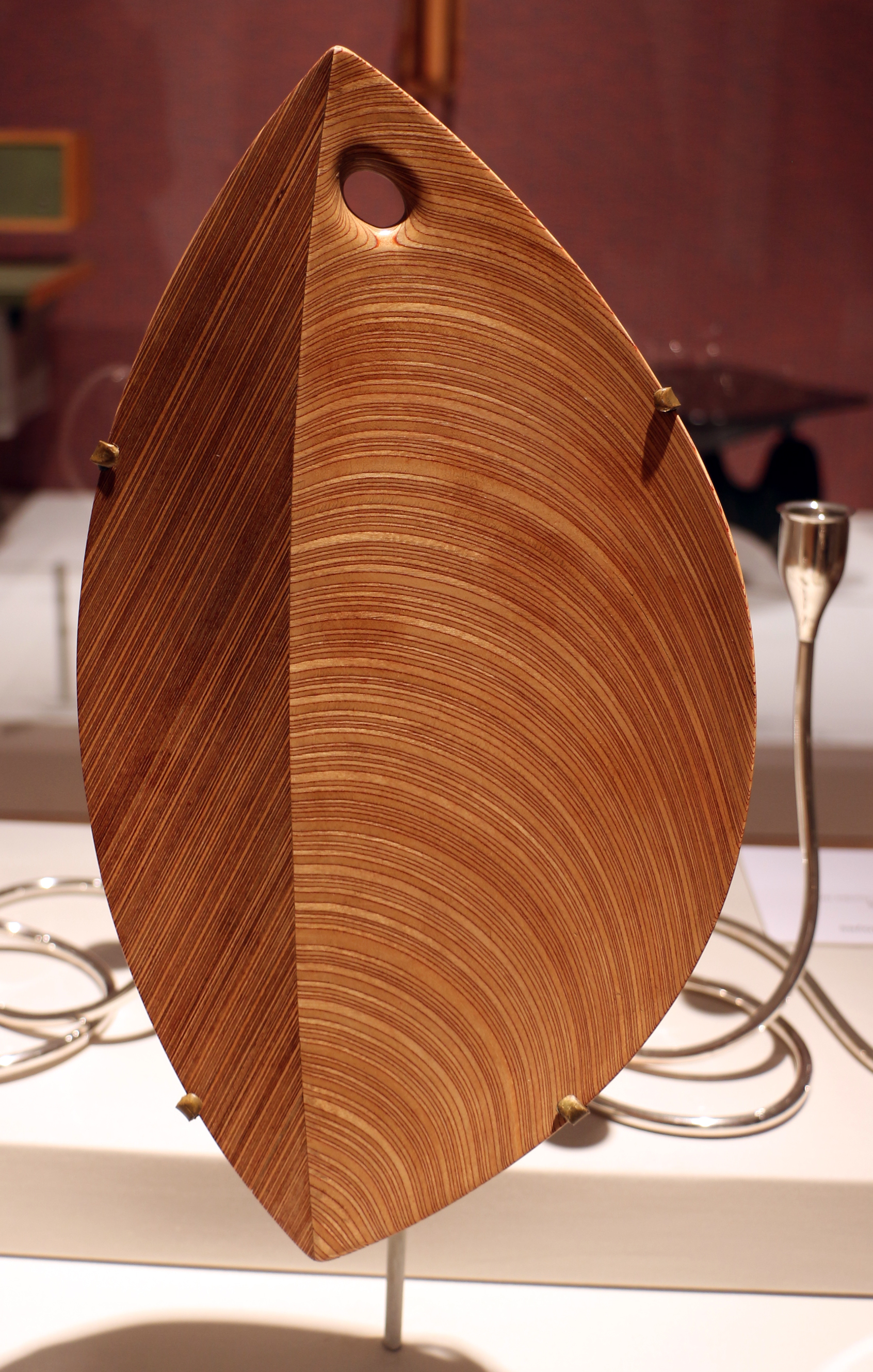
Leaf tray for Soinne et Kni (1951–1954)

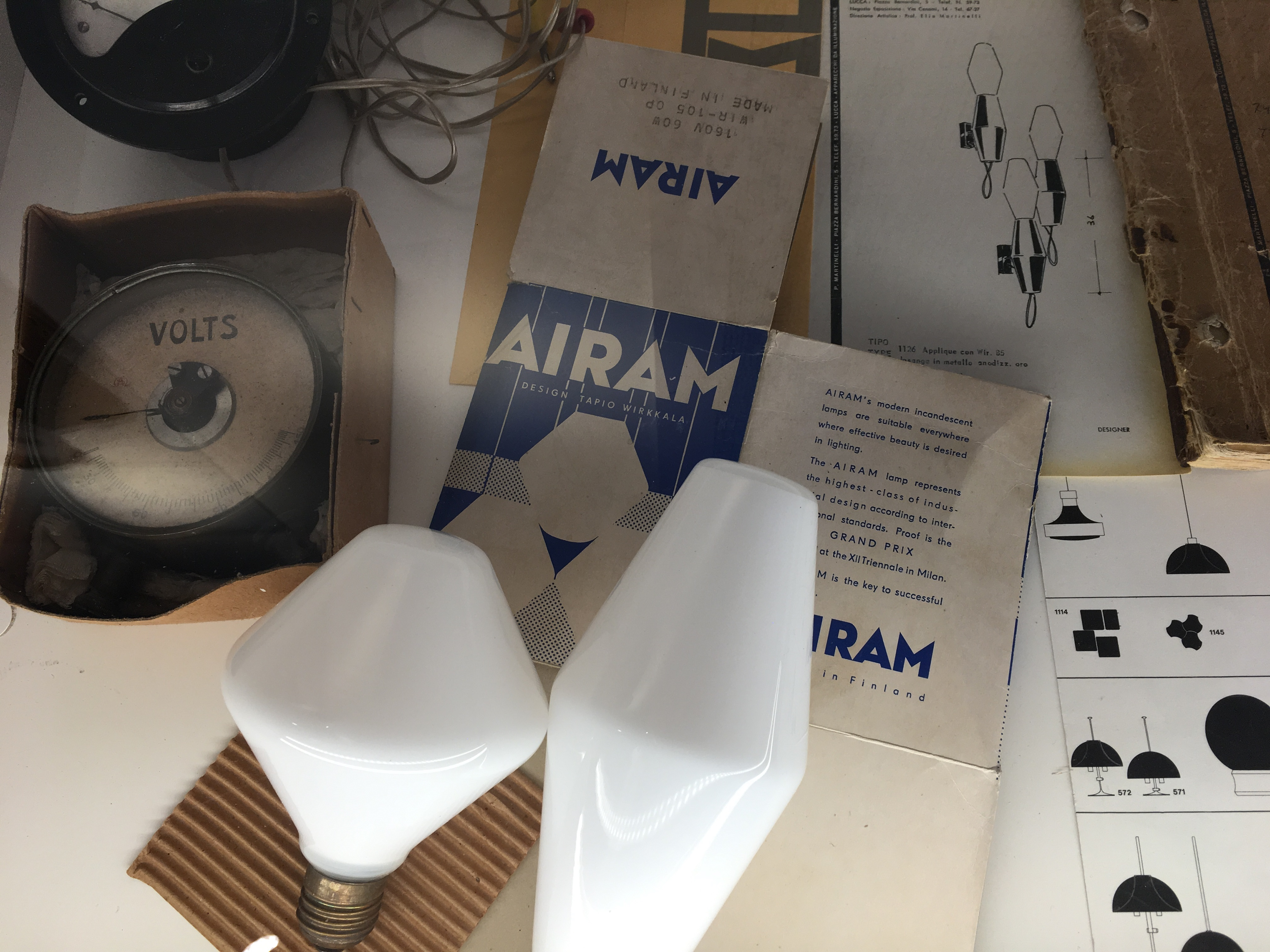
Lightbulbs for AIRAM (1959)

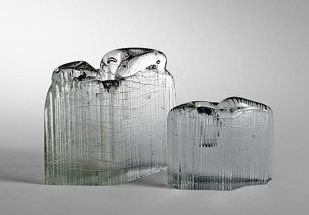
Sculptures from the series Paadarin jää (1960)

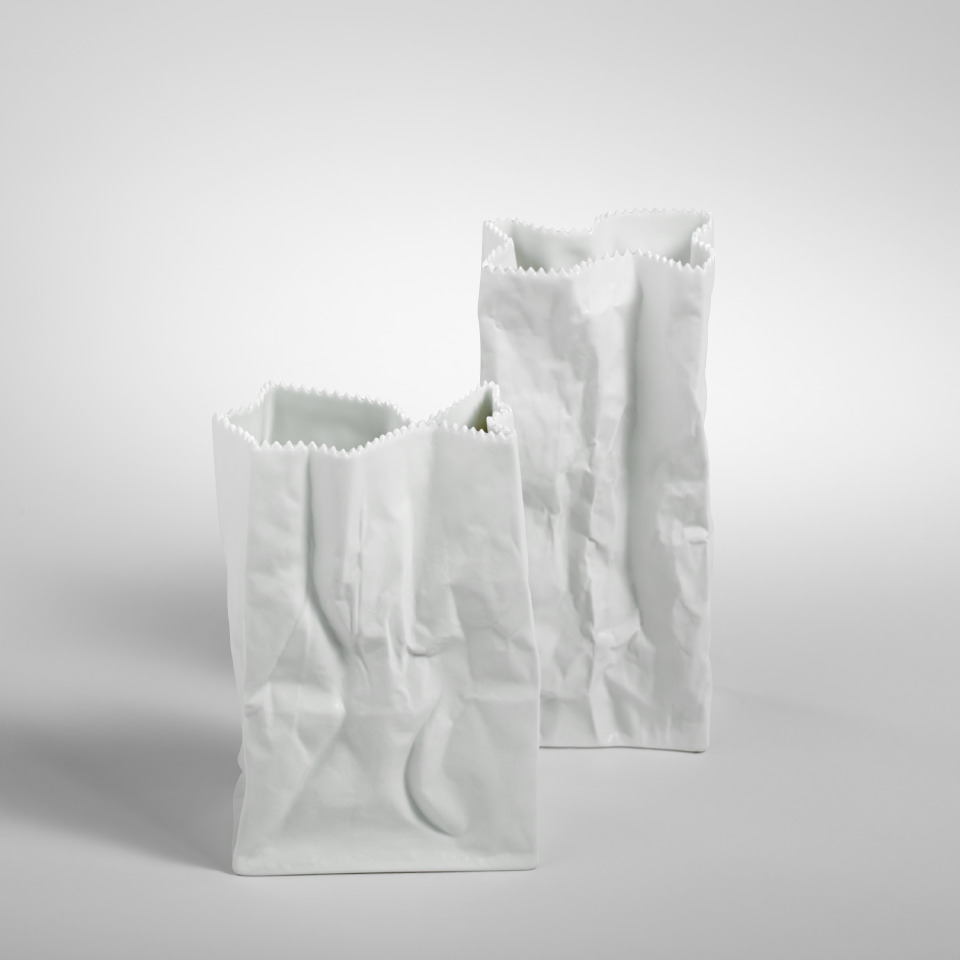
Porcelain "paper bag" vase for Rosenthal (c.1970)

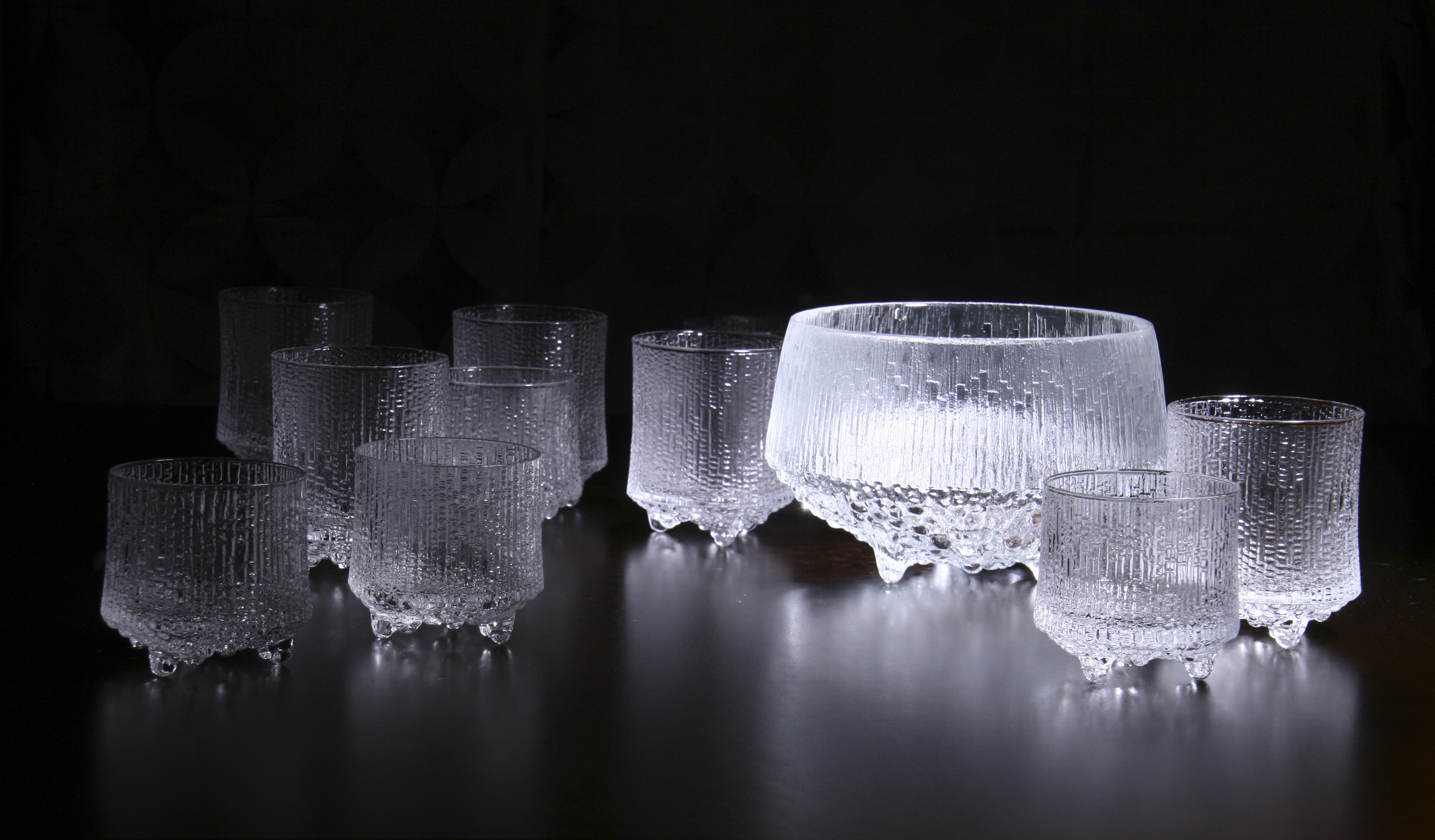
Ultima Thule glassware for Iittala

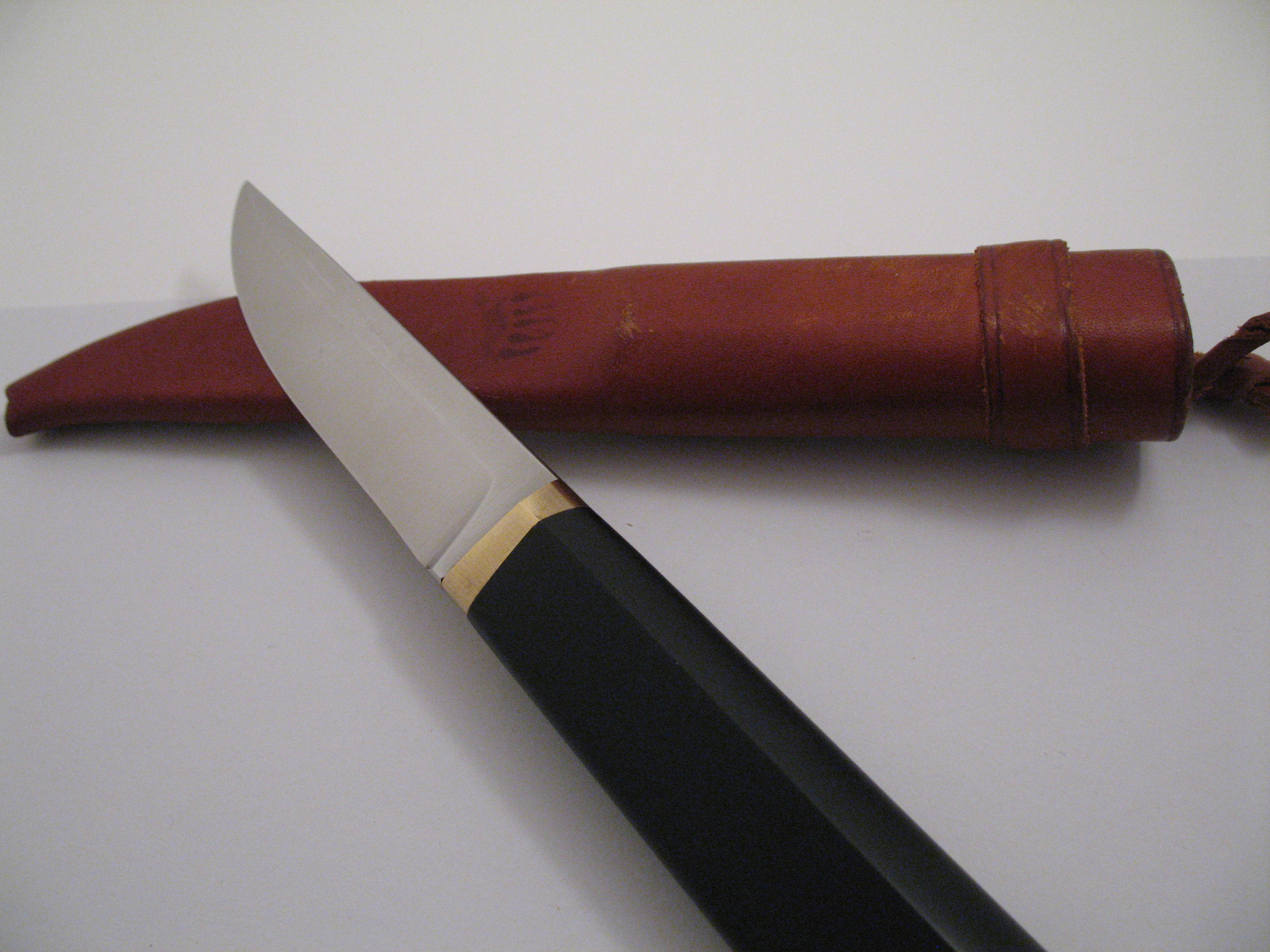
Puukko hand knife

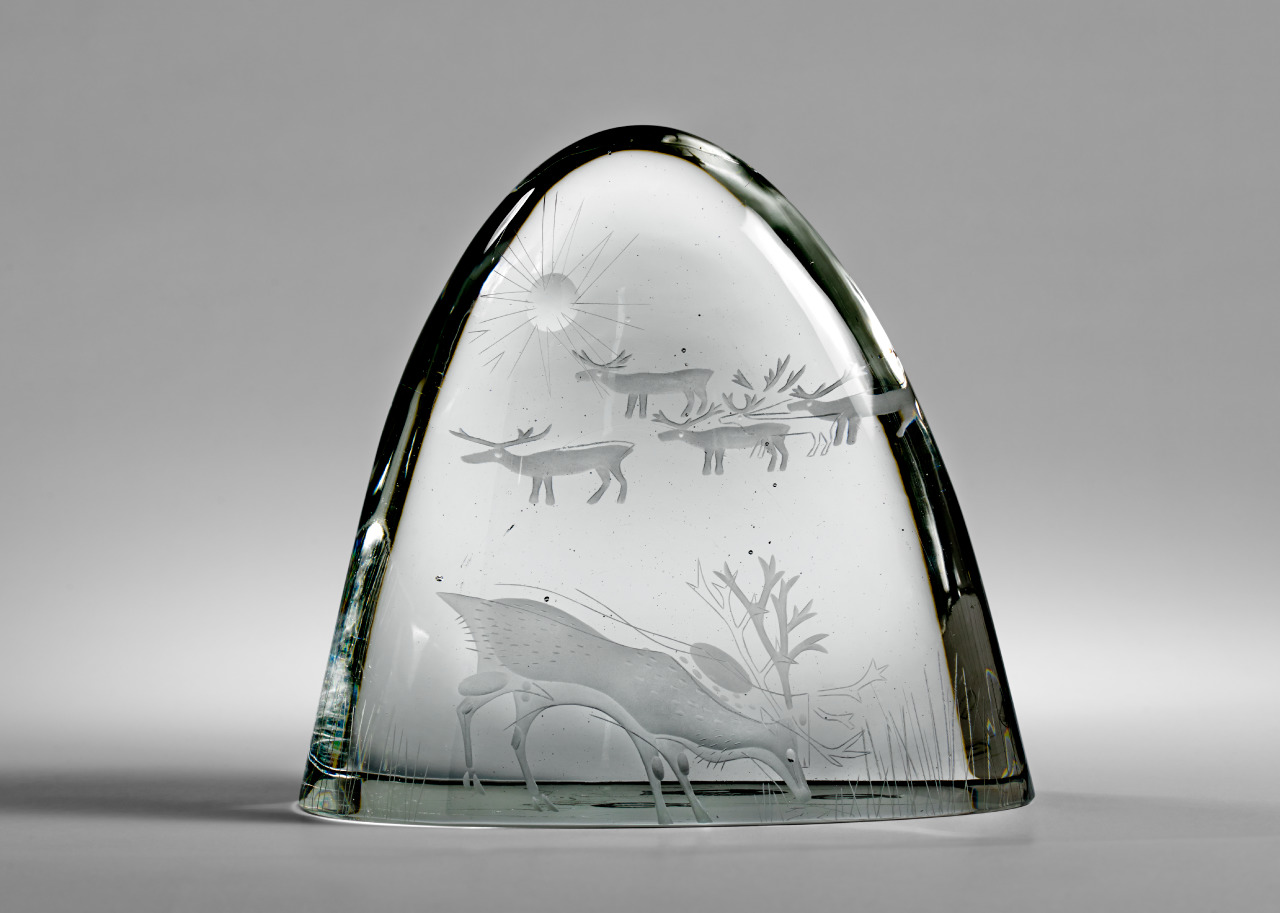
Tunturi, glass sculpture

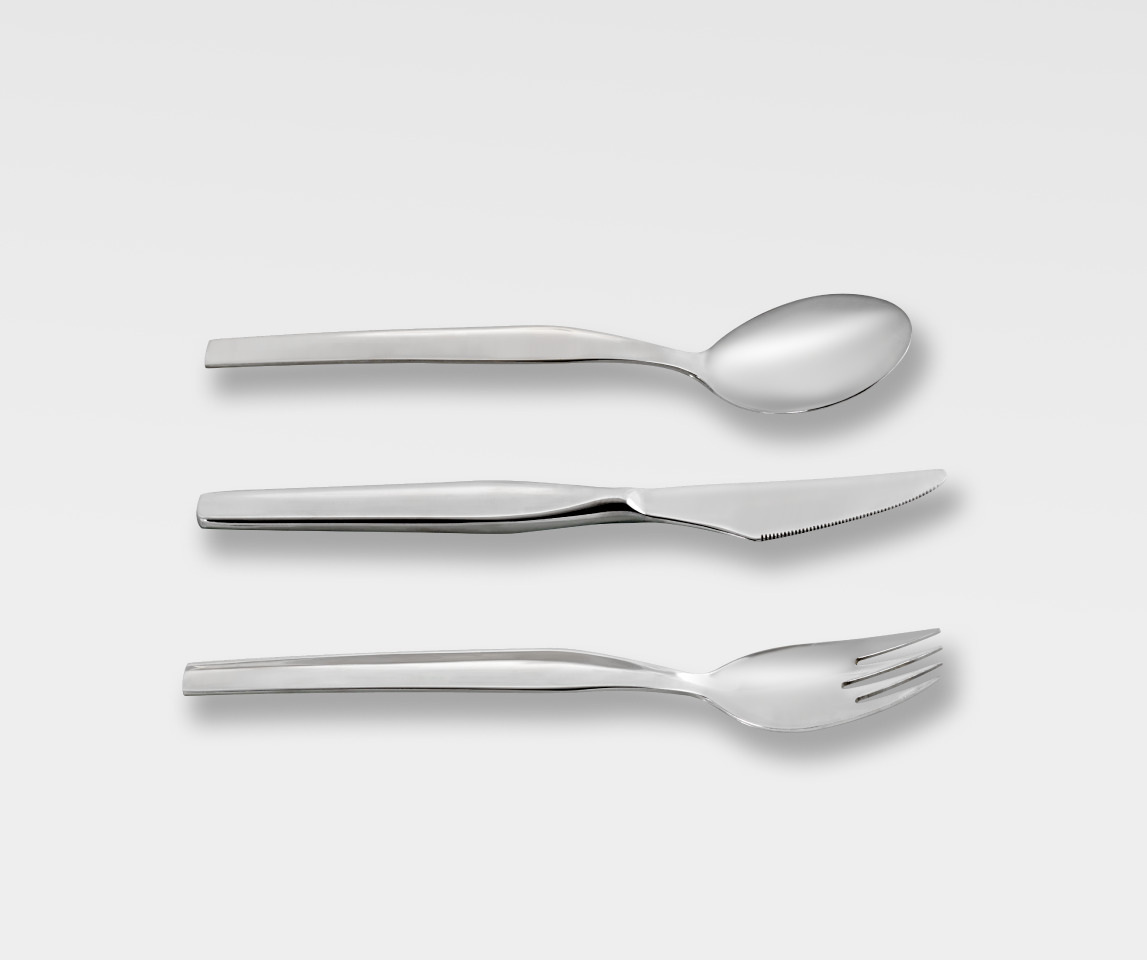
Caravelle cutlery

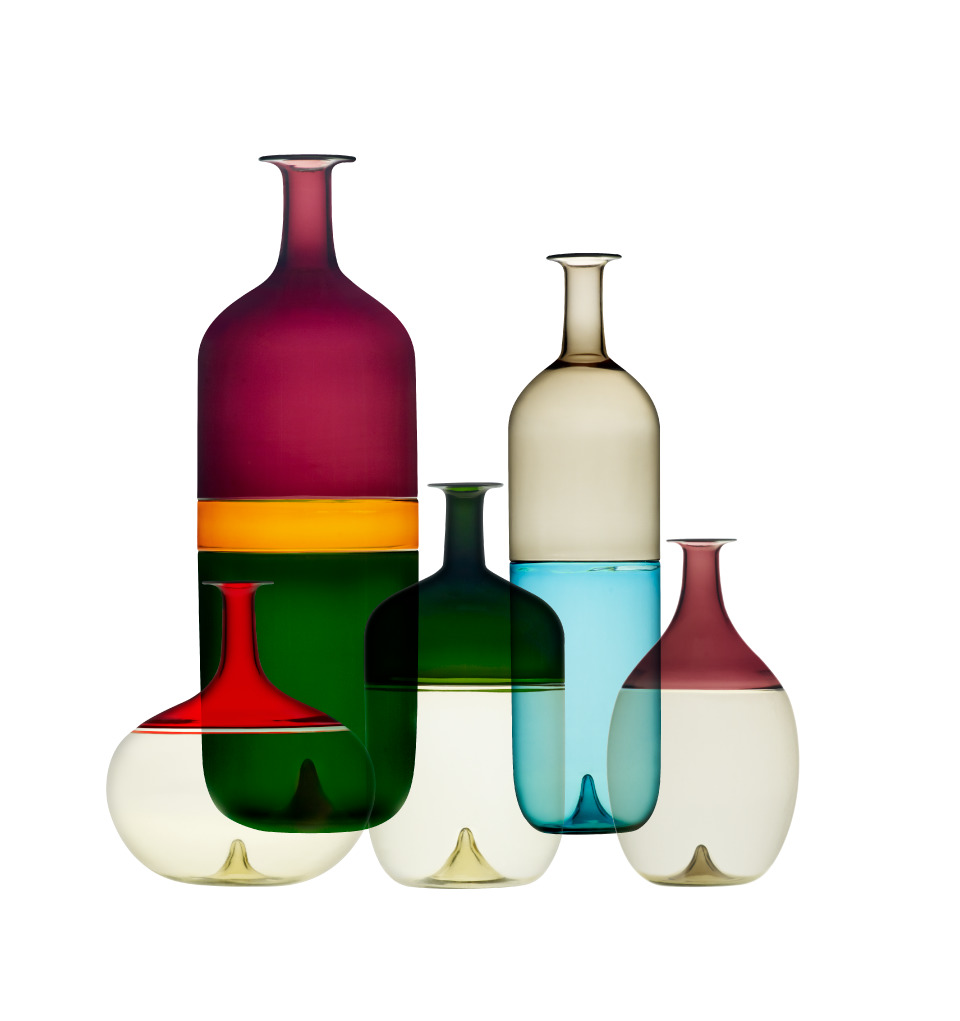
Bottles for Venini

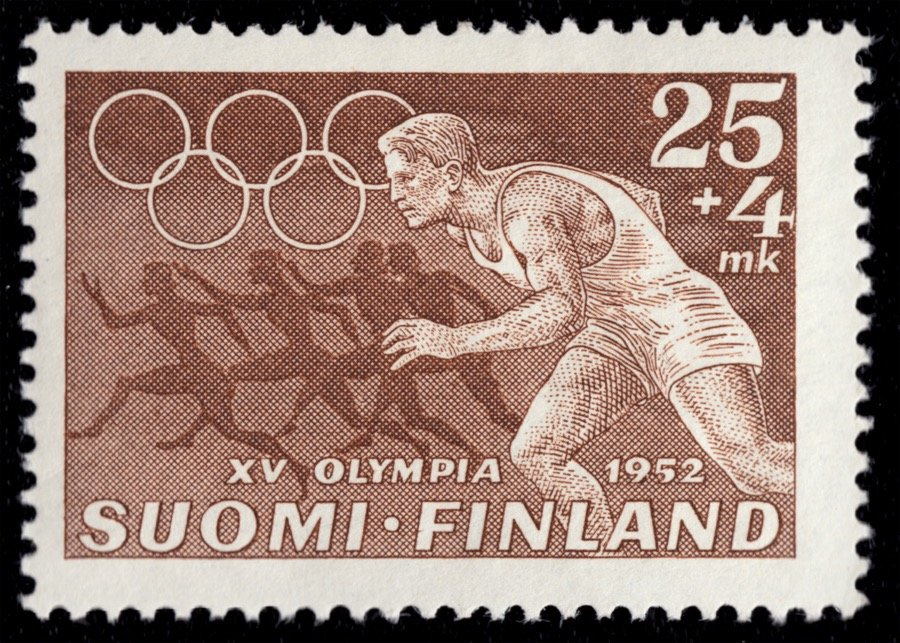
Stamp for the Helsinki summer Olympics

== See also ==
- Tapio Wirkkala Park
