= Prakticum =

Yrkesinstitutet Prakticum
- Location: Porvoo and Helsinki, Finland
- Website: www.prakticum.fi

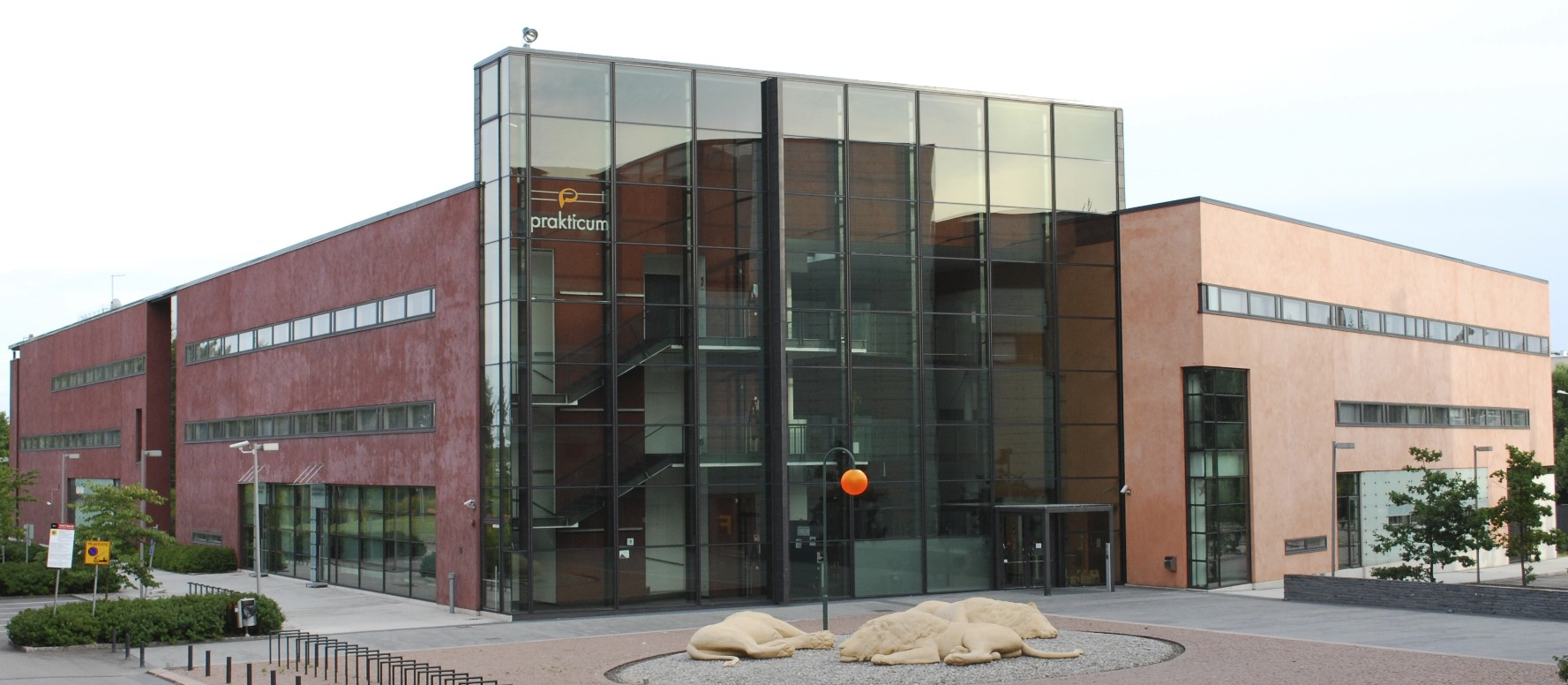
Prakticum Institute

Yrkesinstitutet Prakticum is a secondary vocational institution in the Greater Helsinki area, it offers initial vocational education for young people and adults. The language of instruction is mainly in Swedish.

Study programmes:

- Automation Assembler
- Beauty Therapist
- Business and Administration Clerk
- Business Information Technician
- Cook
- Electrician
- Hairdresser
- Hotel Receptionist
- ICT Assembler
- Media Assistant
- Practical Nurse
- Technology Vendor
- Waiter/Waitress
- Vehicle Mechanic
