= Kalateh-ye Arab, South Khorasan =

Kalateh-ye Arab كلاته عرب
- Village
- Location within Iran
- Coordinates: 32°32′41″N 59°04′54″E
- Country: Iran
- Province: South Khorasan
- County: Khusf
- Bakhsh: Jolgeh-e Mazhan
- Rural District: Jolgeh-e Mazhan

Population (2006)
  - Total: 116
- Time zone: UTC+3:30 (IRST)
  - Summer (DST): UTC+4:30 (IRDT)

Kalateh-ye Arab (Persian: كلاته عرب, also Romanized as Kalāteh-ye ‘Arab and Kalāteh ‘Arab; also known as Kalāt-e ‘Arab and ‘Arab) is a village in Jolgeh-e Mazhan Rural District, Jolgeh-e Mazhan District, Khusf County, South Khorasan Province, Iran. At the 2006 census, its population was 116, in 27 families.
