= SS Arabia (1852) =

Wooden hulled vessel for Cunard

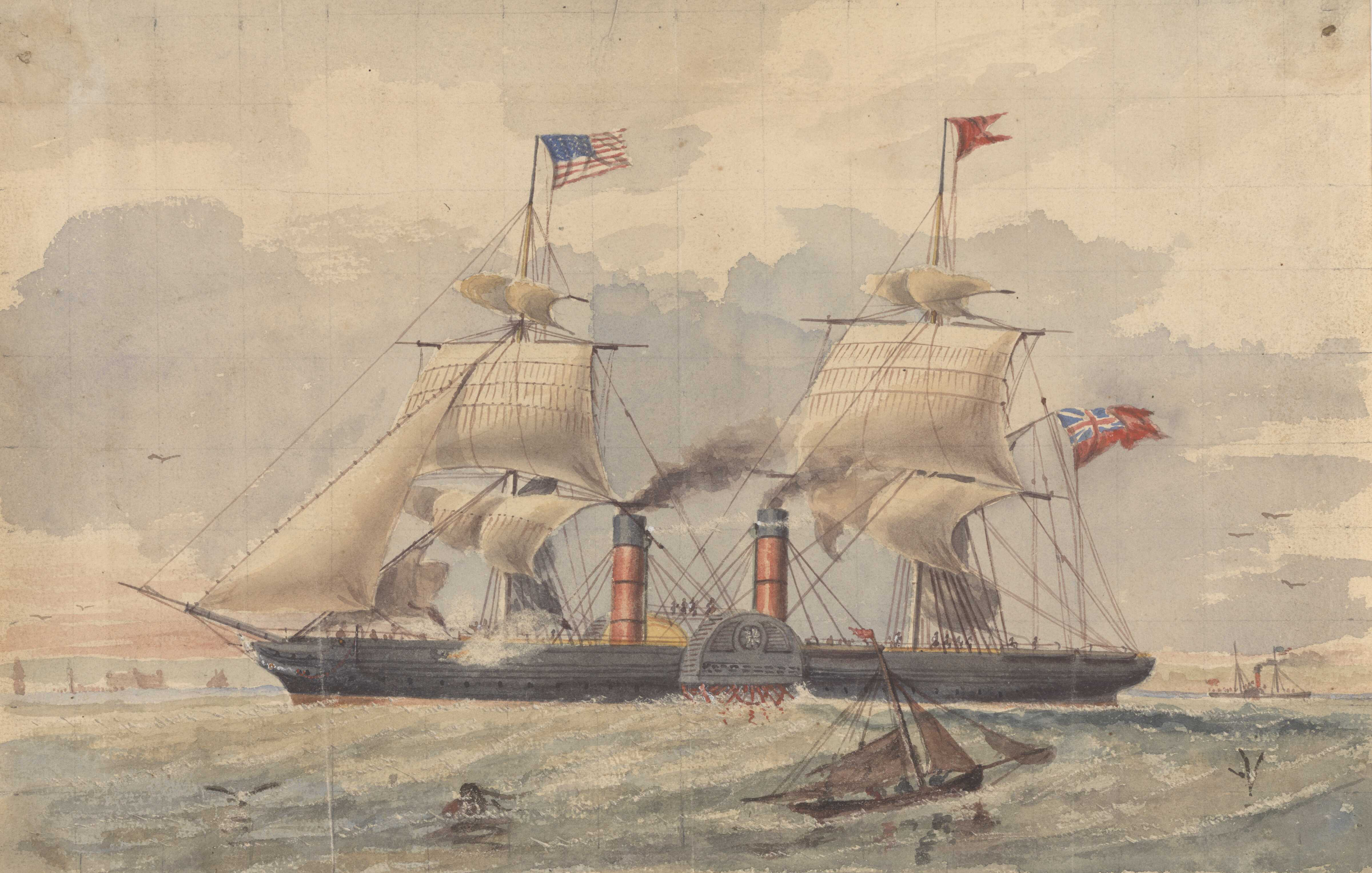

History
- Name: Arabia
- Owner: Cunard Line
- Operator: Cunard Line
- Port of registry: Glasgow, Scotland
- Route: Liverpool to New York City
- Laid down: 1852
- Launched: 21 June 1852
- Completed: 1852
- Maiden voyage: 1 January 1853
- In service: 1853
- Fate: Sold 1865 and converted to sail, scrapped in 1867.

General characteristics
- Type: Paddle steamer
- Tonnage: 2,393 GRT, 1,359 NRT
- Length: 285 feet (87 m)
- Beam: 41 ft (12 m)
- Depth: 27.5 feet (8.4 m)
- Installed power: 9 feet (2.7 m) stroke engine with 103 inches (260 cm) diameter cylinder
- Propulsion: Two 36 feet (11 m) paddle wheels
- Speed: 15 knots (28 km/h; 17 mph)
- Notes: Last wooden-hulled Cunard ship

Royal Mail Steam Ship Arabia (RMS Arabia) was an ocean liner operated by Cunard. It was the last wooden-hulled ship built for the Cunard Line, built in 1852 in Greenock, Scotland. On January 1, 1853, it departed on its maiden voyage with 60 passengers and 1,200 tons of coal. RMS Arabia was a luxurious ship during its time, with the saloon having a stained glass dome and crimson velvet sofas, and steam heating throughout. She was reported to be the first ocean liner with a separate children's nursery and playroom.

Arabia was designed with a slim bow, and powerful engines in an attempt to win the blue riband, of which she never did. The combination of her narrow bow, wooden hull and powerful engines made her incredibly fast in smooth water, though greatly hampered in storms. Its appearance was near identical to the SS La Plata.

It was said the vibrations that Arabia suffered were so intense, that "her machinery shook her to pieces". This is probably why the RMS Persia of 1855 was built of iron, as opposed to the RMS Arabia that was built of wood.

In August 1856, after departing Boston en route to Liverpool, the Arabia ran aground on Blonde Rock and was damaged. In 1858 en route to New York, the ship collided with the Cunarder Europa with minor damage, and continued its voyage. During the Crimean War, the Arabia was used as a transport ship. Arabia was sold in 1865 to Robert Duncan and in 1866 to the Anglo-Egyptian Navigation Company of London, and later scrapped in May 1867.

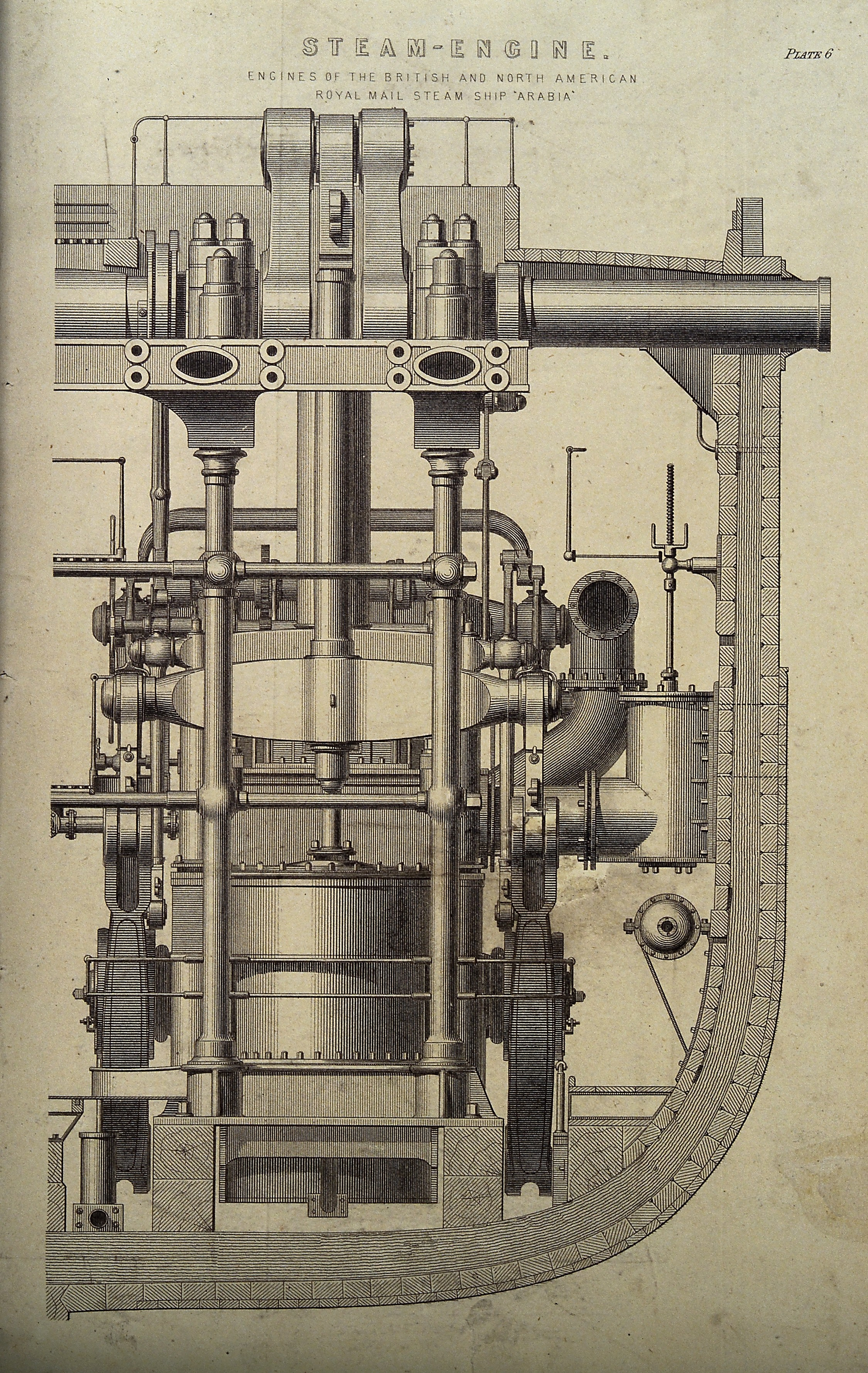
Steam engines of the Arabia
