= USS Arabia =

Patrol vessel of the United States Navy

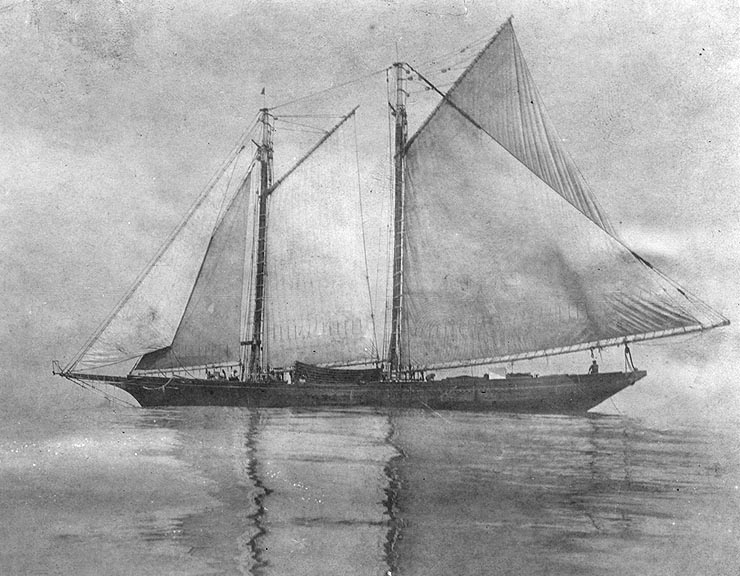
- USS Arabia (ID-3434) under full sail in mid-1918.

History

United States
- Name: USS Arabia
- Namesake: Previous name retained
- Completed: 1903
- Acquired: 13 August 1918
- Commissioned: 14 August 1918
- Stricken: 27 March 1919
- Fate: Sold 11 November 1919
- Notes: Operated as commercial fishing schooner Arabia 1903–1918

General characteristics
- Type: Patrol vessel
- Tonnage: 123.28 Gross register tons
- Length: 113 ft 4 in (34.54 m)
- Beam: 25 ft 9 in (7.85 m)
- Draft: 14 ft 9 in (4.50 m) aft
- Speed: 8 knots
- Complement: 28

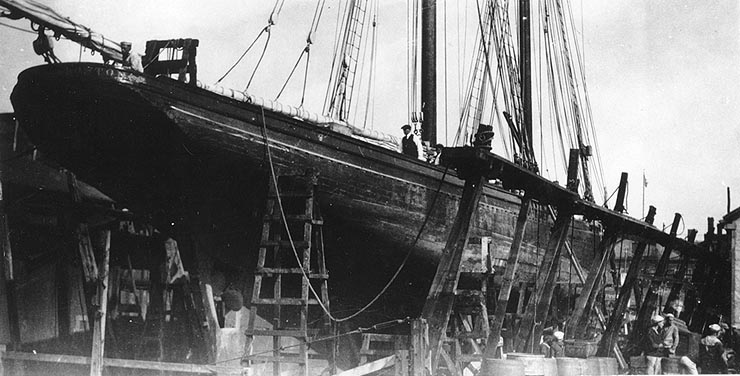
USS Arabia (ID-3434) hauled out of the water, probably while undergoing a formal material inspection at Boston, Massachusetts, ca. 23 September 1918.

USS Arabia (ID-3434) was a United States Navy patrol vessel in commission during 1918.

Arabia was built as a commercial fishing schooner of the same name in 1903 at Essex, Massachusetts. With World War I raging, the German submarine U-117 created havoc with the New England commercial fishing fleet during the summer of 1918, and the U.S. Navy acquired Arabia on 13 August 1918 from the Commonwealth Fisheries Company for use as a decoy ship in antisubmarine operations against U-117. She was assigned the naval registry identification number 3434 and commissioned on 14 August 1918 at Boston, Massachusetts, as USS Arabia (ID-3434).

The concept behind the use of Arabia as a decoy ship was for her to deploy into U-117's presumed operating area teamed with a U.S. Navy submarine, which would follow her. It was hoped that her innocent appearance would lure U-117 to the surface to attack her with gunfire, allowing the submerged U.S. Navy submarine nearby to torpedo and sink the German submarine. In addition to a Navy crew of two officers and seven enlisted men, 19 fishermen – 16 of them from Arabia's original crew – were recruited into the United States Naval Reserve Forces to lend an aura of realism to the operation.

Arabia departed Boston on 14 August 1918 and shaped a course for the fishing grounds at Georges Bank, a large elevated area of the sea floor which separates the Gulf of Maine from the Atlantic Ocean situated between Cape Cod, Massachusetts, and Cape Sable Island, Nova Scotia, Canada. Once there, she operated in concert with the U.S. Navy submarine USS N-1 (Submarine No. 53) until after the Armistice with Germany ended World War I on 11 November 1918. Never having encountered U-117, Arabia concluded her operations when she returned to port on 27 November 1918.

Arabia was decommissioned soon after her return. She was stricken from the Navy List on 27 March 1919 and was sold to Mr. W. V. M. Powelson of New York City on 11 November 1919.

== Bibliography ==
- Beyer, Edward F. & Beyer, Kenneth M. (1991). "U. S. Navy Mystery Ships". Warship International. XXVIII (4). International Naval Research Organization: 322–372. ISSN 0043-0374.
