= Ərəb, Agdash =

Ərəb
- Municipality
- Location within Azerbaijan
- Coordinates: 40°40′36″N 47°33′16″E
- Country: Azerbaijan
- Rayon: Agdash

Population
  - Total: 1,395
- Time zone: UTC+4 (AZT)
  - Summer (DST): UTC+5 (AZT)

Ərəb (also known as Arab-Kyukel’) is a village and municipality in the Agdash Rayon of Azerbaijan. It has a population of 1,395.
