= Ərəb, Khachmaz =

Ərəb
- Municipality
- Location within Azerbaijan
- Coordinates: 41°25′26″N 48°57′04″E
- Country: Azerbaijan
- Rayon: Khachmaz

Population
  - Total: 969
- Time zone: UTC+4 (AZT)
  - Summer (DST): UTC+5 (AZT)

Ərəb (also, Arab-Babaly) is a village and municipality in the Khachmaz Rayon of Azerbaijan. It has a population of 969.
