= Ərəb, Masally =

Village and municipality in Masally Rayon, Azerbaijan

Ərəb
- Municipality
- Location within Azerbaijan
- Coordinates: 39°08′31″N 48°44′10″E
- Country: Azerbaijan
- Rayon: Masally

Population
  - Total: 1,055
- Time zone: UTC+4 (AZT)
  - Summer (DST): UTC+5 (AZT)

Ərəb (also, Arab and Arap) is a village and municipality in the Masally Rayon of Azerbaijan. It has a population of 1,055.
