= Ərəbyengicə =

- Municipality
- Location within Azerbaijan
- Coordinates: 39°28′31″N 44°57′00″E
- Country: Azerbaijan
- Autonomous republic: Nakhchivan
- District: Sharur

Population (2005)
  - Total: 894
- Time zone: UTC+4 (AZT)

Ərəbyengicə (also, Ərəb Yengicə, Arab Yengidzha, Erebyengicesi) is a village and municipality in the Sharur District of Nakhchivan Autonomous Republic, Azerbaijan. It is located 12 km in the south from the district center, on the left bank of the Arpachay River. Its population is busy with farming and animal husbandry. There are secondary school, club and a medical center in the village. It has a population of 894.

== Etymology ==
The name of Ərəbyengicə (Arabyengidzha) village made out from the words of ərəb (etno-name) and yengicə (new, fresh) means "new Arab village, or the new founded Arab village".

== Historical and archaeological monuments ==
=== Ərəbyengicə ===
Ərəbyengicə is an ancient settlement in Sharur region. It is located south of the village of Ərəbyengicə (Erebyengicesi), about 200 meters north from the Araz River.

The area of the monument approximately is 0.8 hectares. During the farm works, the monument were badly damaged and only remained a central part in 80–90 cm of height.

The collected materials here show the existence of cultural layers of the Eneolithic and Kura–Araxes culture. Because of the Eneolithic ceramic fragments made from clay are small, it is not possible to determine the exact forms of pots. The edge of the mouth of the pots is cut straight. There are examples of both well and poorly fired vessels. Surfaces were slightly smoothed. In general, the ceramic is close to the materials of Kultepe I. In the settlement, the remains of obsidian have been found. The settlement belongs to the 4th and 3rd millenniums BC.

Chaff-faced and chaff-tempered ware has been found here. Sometimes this pottery also has combed surfaces; it is typical of the Late Chalcolithic of Southern Azerbaijan, and of Nakhchivan region. It is also found in north-western Iran. Similar pottery is found at Kültepe I, Khalaj, Sederek, and Kul Tepe of Marand in Iran.
