= Ərəb Qubalı =

- Municipality
- Location within Azerbaijan
- Coordinates: 40°09′48″N 48°25′24″E
- Country: Azerbaijan
- Rayon: Kurdamir
- Time zone: UTC+4 (AZT)
  - Summer (DST): UTC+5 (AZT)

Ərəb Qubalı (also, Ərəbqubalı, Arab-Kubali, Arabkubaly, Kubali, and Kubalikend) is a village and municipality in the Kurdamir Rayon of Azerbaijan.
