= Arabia, Nebraska =

Unincorporated community in Nebraska, United States

- Unincorporated Community
- Location within Nebraska Location within the United States
- Coordinates: 42°43′52″N 100°22′21″W
- Country: United States
- State: Nebraska
- County: Cherry

Arabia is an unincorporated community in Cherry County, Nebraska, United States.

== History ==
A post office was established at Arabia in 1883, and remained in operation until it was discontinued in 1919. The soil at Arabia was thought to resemble the sandy soil of the Arabian Peninsula, hence the name.
