= Karia HM V =

HM V
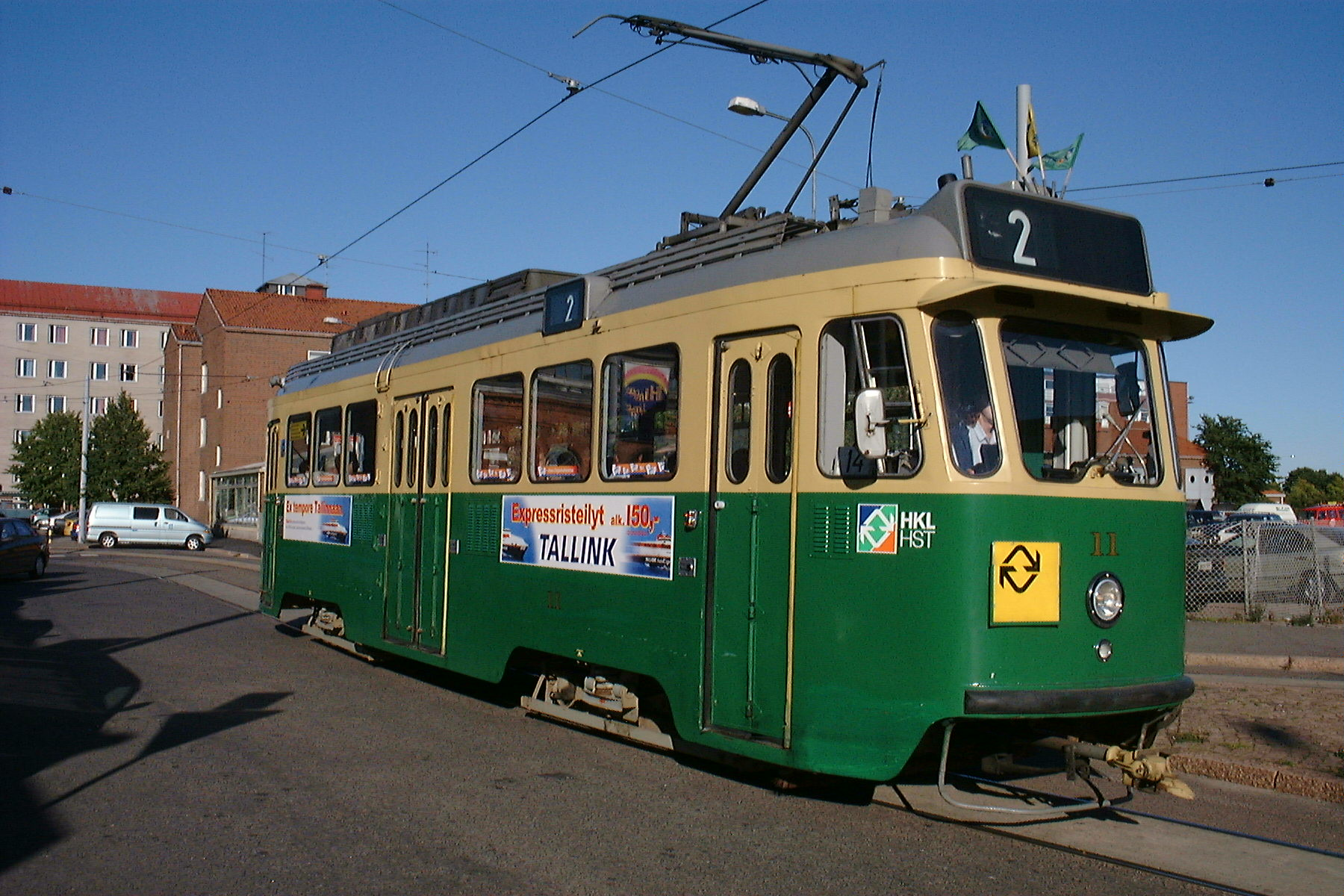
- An HM V class tram on the now-defunct line 2 in Helsinki
- In service: Yes
- Manufacturer: Karia (OY Karia AB)
- Built at: Karis
- Constructed: 1959
- Entered service: 1959
- Refurbished: 2004–07 (only two cars refurbished as of August 2008)
- Scrapped: 1993 onwards
- Number built: 15
- Number in service: 3 (not in regular traffic)
- Number scrapped: 9
- Fleet numbers: 1–15, 175
- Capacity: 29 seated, 69 standing (as built); 31 seated, 57 standing (one-person operation)
- Operator: Helsinki City Transport (HKL)
- Line served: All Helsinki tram lines

Specifications
- Car length: 13.5 m (44 ft 3 1/2 in)
- Width: 2.3 m (7 ft 6 1/2 in)
- Height: 3.6 m (11 ft 9 3/4 in) with pantograph down
- Weight: 20 tonnes (19.7 long tons; 22.0 short tons)
- Traction system: Electric
- Traction motors: 4 × Strömberg GHAU-672; 4 × ABB M2CF 250S 4B30E (number 11 from 1995 onwards)
- Power output: 50 kW (67 hp); 55 kW (74 hp) (number 11 from 1995 onwards)
- Electric system: 600 V DC overhead lines
- Current collection: Pantograph
- Braking system: hand / air / electric / track
- Track gauge: 1,000 mm (3 ft 3 3/8 in) metre gauge

HM V is a class of two-bogie four-axle (Bo′Bo′ wheel arrangement) tram operated by Helsinki City Transport (Finnish: Helsingin kaupungin liikennelaitos, abbreviated HKL; Swedish: Helsingfors stads trafikverk, abbreviated HST) on the Helsinki tram network. All trams of this type were built by the Finnish tram manufacturer Karia in 1959.

The first trams of this type were withdrawn from service in 1993. As of 2008 six trams (numbers 9, 11–14 and 175) remain in operational condition. Of these, two have been extensively repaired and are occasionally used in normal service (numbers 9 and 12), one has been converted into a restaurant tram (former no. 15, now no. 175 "SpåraKoff") and one is used as a non-passenger carrying advertisement tram (no. 14).

== Concept and construction ==
The HM V type trams, alongside the near-identical RM 3 type produced at the same time by Valmet, were the last development in a series of five near-identical tram types produced by Karia and Valmet for operations on the Helsinki and Turku tramway network during the 1950s (the previous types being HM IV and RM 1 for Helsinki and RM 2 for Turku).

HKL ordered the HM V type trams from Karia, a subsidiary company of Suomen Autoteollisuus, in 1957. The series designation stands for Helsingin moottorivaunu, viides sarja (English: Helsinki motor tram, series five). Karia built the bodies and assembled the trams, while Sisu (another subsidiary company of Suomen Autoteollisuus) supplied the bogies and Strömberg the electronics.

== Service history ==
The first HM V tram, number 1, was delivered to the HKL on 27 April 1959, with number 15 delivered last in the series on 23 October 1959. Coinciding with the delivery of these new trams the HKL had decided to reset their numbering scheme. Therefore, the HM V trams were numbered starting from one and not from 376, as they would have been had the old numbering been continued. The HM V trams were built to be compatible with the HP II type trailers that had been constructed in 1958–59, also by Karia. The usage of trailers in Helsinki ended in 1983, although the couplers needed for hauling trailers were retained in the HM V type trams for many years afterwards, number 14 being the last tram to have one, with the coupler removed only in 2006.

Originally the HM V trams were built to be operated by two people, with a separate driver and conductor. Between 1978 and 1982 they were converted to one-person operations, with the driver also acting as the ticket seller.

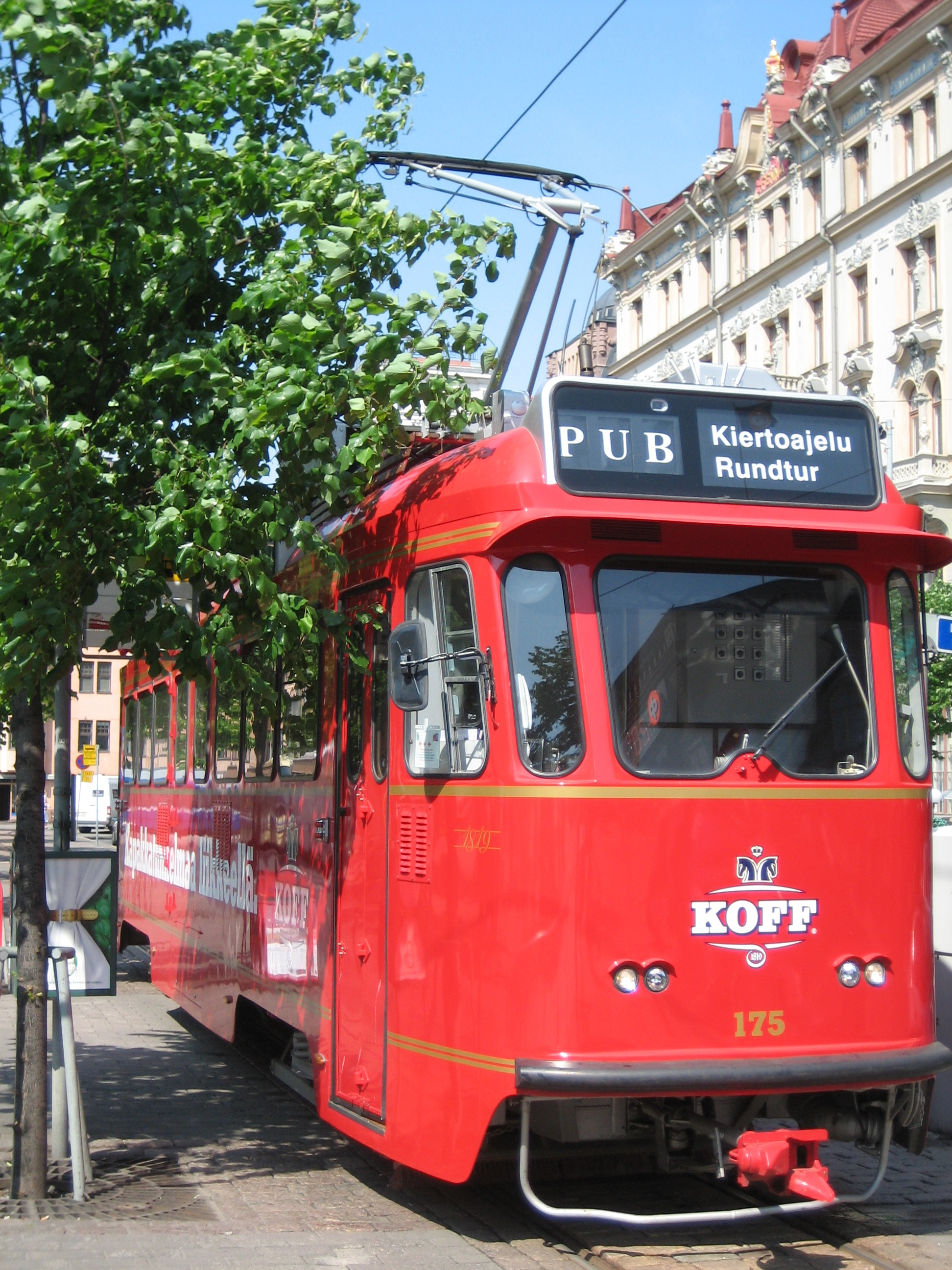
HM V number 175 "SpåraKoff", at Mikonkatu tram stop in Rautatientori.

The first HM V units to be withdrawn from service were numbers 5 and 6, withdrawn in 1993, with number 7 following in 1994. In 1994 work also begun on converting number 15 into a pub tram. These works were completed in 1995, when number 15 was renumbered into number 175 in honour of the 175th anniversary of the Sinebrychoff brewery, who also paid the conversion work of the tram. In addition to be being renumbered, the tram was named SpåraKoff (from Helsinki slang Spåra, tram, and "Koff", a beer brand brewed by Sinebrychoff). Also during 1995 number 11 was rebuilt as a "NAC prototype" by ABB, with new traction motors and control devices.

During the latter half of the 1990s HKL ordered 40 low-floor Variotrams, which were projected to replace the HM V and RM 3 types in their entirety. During the early 2000s three HM V trams were withdrawn from service, with number 4 withdrawn in 2000, and numbers 1 and 2 during the following year. However, due to persistent technical problems of the Variotrams, some other units in the class remained in service. In 2004–05 number 12 was in Tallinna Trammi- ja Trollibussikoondis (TTTK) depot in Tallinn for large-scale repair/renovation process. Similar renovation were carried out at TTTK on number 9 in 2005–07. Number 11 received smaller-scale renovation in 2007. While these three trams were restored, numbers 3, 8 and 10 were withdrawn from service in 2006–07, leaving six HM V trams in existence.

== Liveries ==
Originally all HM V trams were painted in the traditional yellow/green livery used in HKL trams, with the top half of the carriage painted yellow and the bottom half green. In 1995 on conversion into the Spårakoff pub tram, number 175, ex-15, received a new all-red livery advertising Koff beer. Numbers 8, 9 and 15 had occasionally been used as advertisement trams during the 1990s, and from 2005 onwards number 14 has been used as an advertisement tram, covered entirely in adverts of various companies.

During the extensive repairs at TTTK in Tallinn, number 9 and 12 have been painted with a modified version of the original livery, with added silver decorative stripes; one running between the yellow and green fields, and another near the bottom of the carriage.

== Interior layout and design ==
In the original interior layout with a separate conductor and driver the HM V trams had capacity of 29 seated passengers and 69 standing passengers. During the rush hour this could be exceeded by an additional 50 standing passengers. On conversion to one-person operation during the late 1970s and early 80s, the conductor's seat was replaced with two additional seats, bringing the seating capacity up to 31, while the standing capacity was downsized to 57 plus an additional 44 during the rush hour. Following conversion into the Spårakoff, tram number 175 (ex-15) has a capacity of 24 all-seated passengers.

== Names ==
The nicknames "Keppi-Karia", "keppi-Karjaa", "laihialainen" and "laihian nivel" have been used the HM V trams. Below are some of the explanations that have been offered for these nicknames.

- Keppi-Karia ("stick-Karia") and keppi-Karjaa ("stick-Karjaa")—reportedly after the stick-like controlling device in the trams combined with the name and location of the manufacturer in Karis.
- Laihialainen (roughly "thing from Laihia"), Laihian nivel (joint of Laihia)—in Finnish folklore, the inhabitants of the municipality of Laihia are believed to be extreme misers, while an articulated tram is in Finnish referred to as nivelvaunu, literally "jointed tram". These nicknames are said to refer to the changes made to the trams when they were converted to one-person operations. At the same time they were also refitted with door controllers similar to the newer Nr I type articulated trams, making the HM V units into "a miser's articulated tram". An alternative explanation for the name laihialainen is that the removal of the conductors made them "stripped models" and the nickname was used to describe the lack of conductors.

== See also ==
- Trams in Finland
