= Turku tramway =

Planned tramway in Turku, Finland

Overview
- Native name: Finnish: Turun raitiotie; Swedish: Spårväg i Åbo
- Area served: Turku, Finland
- Transit type: Light rail
- Website: turunraitiotie.fi/en/

Operation
- Operation will start: 2033
System map
Planned stops

The Turku tramway is a planned light rail line to be constructed between Varissuo and Port of Turku in Turku, Finland. The project was approved by the city council in 2026, with an expected opening date in 2033. The city's previous electric tramway system was closed down in 1972.

== History ==
Route plan from 2020. The planned phase in blue and possible extensions in red.

=== Previous studies ===
The recreation of a rail-based public transport system in the city, either in the form of another tram system or a light rail one, has been discussed since the closure of the previous tram system in 1972. A museum tramway utilising the remaining trams in the possession of the City of Turku was also proposed.

On 4 December 2000 the Turku municipal executive committee ordered a preliminary study to be made about the possible construction of a light rail system in the city, replacing the most popular bus connections that are already running at maximal capacity. The study was completed in 2002. This study recommended the creation of a light rail system with a track gauge of 1,524 mm (5 ft) to facilitate the usage of train tracks in parts of the system. Two main lines were proposed in the study, one with the route Naantali–Raisio–Turku–Kaarina and another with the route Runosmäki–Turku city center–Varissuo. The cost of the proposed 43.1 km (26.8 mi) system was at the time of the study's completion projected at over €320 million.

In 2008 the city of Turku ordered a more detailed study to be made about the way public transport systems are developed in the City Region of Turku in the future, comparing light rail- and bus-based alternatives. The goal is to present a solution for the creation of an efficient, attractive and uniform public transport system for Turku and the neighbouring cities. An intermediary report for this study was completed in December 2008, which recommended a somewhat different light rail system from the 2002 study. In the 2008 study the line to Naantali was abandoned but a more extensive network within central Turku was proposed, including the recreation of tracks that had been used by the old Turku tram system.

The 2008 report recommended for the construction of the light rail network to take place in two phases: phase 1 would be completed by 2020 and would include the lines Runosmäki–Majakkaranta (in Korppolaismäki) and Varissuo–Turku Central railway station. The total length of these lines would be 17.7 km (11.0 mi). Phase 2 would be completed after 2020, coinciding with new residential development in Raisio and Kaarina, and would include a third line Kaarina–central Turku–Raisio and an extension of the Varissuo–Central railway station to the Port of Turku. Total length of the system following phase 2 would be 37.7 km (23.4 mi). As the new proposal does not feature any running on train tracks, rail gauges of 1,000 mm (3 ft 3 3/8 in), 1,435 mm (4 ft 8 1/2 in) and 1,524 mm (5 ft) were presented as alternatives. No preference was given to any of the listed gauges, although the benefits of the 1,435 mm (4 ft 8 1/2 in) standard gauge were stated to be the highest of the 3 alternatives.

The final report on the recommended future development of public transport in Turku was delivered in April 2009. Based on this report, the city council of Turku decided on 15 December 2009 that in the short run the city's public transport system would be rearranged to allow the establishment of a bus rapid transit line. In the long run the usage of trolleybuses will be studied, while the most heavily trafficked core bus lines are to be converted into light rail lines.

=== Current proposal and construction ===
In 2023, the Turku city board approved a general plan for a tram line connecting the Port of Turku and Varissuo. The proposed line would span 12 kilometers and include 20 stops. Construction of the line was approved by the Turku city council in May 2026. Service is due to begin in 2033. Construction is due to begin in early 2027 with renovations of the Tuomiokirkkosilta bridge and with required archaeological work, with construction of the actual tramway planned for 2028–2032.

==== Route information ====
The proposed tram line will connect the Port of Turku with Varissuo, featuring a total of 20 stops and operating with a fleet of 13 trams. During peak hours, trams will be running at intervals of 7.5 minutes, which will be shortened to 6 minutes by 2050. During early evenings and main weekend periods, trams will run every 10 minutes, with frequencies decreasing to every 15 to 30 minutes during early mornings and late evenings.

Service hours are planned to begin at 5:00 AM on weekdays, 6:00 AM on Saturdays, and 7:00 AM on Sundays, with operations ending at 1:30 AM daily. The journey between the end stops is expected to take approximately 35 minutes, with travel times of 13 minutes from the Port to the Market Square and 22 minutes from the Market Square to Varissuo.

The tram line is planned to include several notable stops, such as the Port, Market Square, Cathedral, University Hospital, and Science Park, as well as stops in residential areas, with four located in the Varissuo district. By 2050, it is estimated that approximately 30% of Turku's population, 46% of its jobs, and 42% of residential developments will be located within 600 meters of a tram stop. Additionally, the majority of the University of Turku, Åbo Akademi University, and Turku University of Applied Sciences campuses located in Turku will also be within this range.

A key focus of the tram line project is improving connectivity between the Varissuo district and the rest of the city. Varissuo, which has often been associated with challenges related to its immigrant-majority population, is expected to benefit from enhanced accessibility through this project.
