= Valmet RM 2 =

RM 2
- A RM 2 class tram on line 2 in Turku, September 1971
- Manufacturer: Valmet
- Built at: Valmet airplane factory, Tampere
- Constructed: 1956
- Entered service: 1956
- Scrapped: 1972 onwards
- Number built: 8
- Number scrapped: 8
- Fleet numbers: 48–55
- Capacity: 17 seated, 83 standing
- Operator: Turku City Transport (TuKL)
- Line served: All Turku tram lines

Specifications
- Car length: 11.60 m (38 ft 3/4 in)
- Width: 2.1 m (6 ft 10 5/8 in)
- Height: 3.75 m (12 ft 3 5/8 in) with pantograph down
- Maximum speed: 50 km/h (31 mph) (official, 90 km/h (56 mph) reached during trials)
- Weight: 20 t (19.7 long tons; 22.0 short tons)
- Traction system: Electric
- Traction motors: Four (4) Strömberg GHAU-67 E
- Power output: 4 x 50 kW (67 hp) / 200 kW (268 hp)
- Electric system: ? V DC overhead lines
- Current collection: Pantograph
- Braking system: hand / air / electric / track
- Track gauge: 1,000 mm (3 ft 3 3/8 in) metre gauge

RM 2 was a class of two-bogie four-axle (Bo′Bo′ wheel arrangement) tram operated by Turku City Transport (Finnish: Turun kaupungin liikennelaitos (TuKL); Swedish: Åbo stads trafikverk), popularly known as "ghost cars". They were the last trams acquired for the Turku tram network prior to its closure in 1972, built by the Finnish metal industry corporation Valmet in 1956. Although never operated as such, these trams were designed for use on light rail lines.

All RM 2s were withdrawn in June 1972 upon the closure of tram line 2. Although attempts were made to sell the trams to new operators, they never returned to active service. Five were sold for scrap; three were given to private organisations for preservation, but were scrapped by the 1980s.

== Concept and construction ==
The trams were, like the older Karia HM IV and Valmet RM 1 types trams built for the Helsinki tram network, based on Swiss Standard Trams of the time but with numerous changes. The RM 2 was shorter and narrower than the Helsinki trams and had no middle doors. They were constructed in collaboration with Tampella and Strömberg, who provided the bogies and electronics respectively. As a result, the RM 2 class, along with the similar RM 1 and RM 3 classes, were also referred to as VTS trams. Due to the Tampella-built bogies and rubber dampened wheels the RM 2 trams ran extremely silently and smoothly, earning them the nickname "ghost cars" (Finnish: "Aavevaunut"). The RM 2 class had 1+1 seating arrangement (instead of Helsinki's 2+1) to maximise capacity.

During the early 1950s, when the RM 2 class were ordered, there was an ongoing struggle in the decision-making organs of Turku on whether the tram network should be expanded with light rail lines into the suburban areas or closed down. The design of the RM 2 class was optimised for usage on light rail lines, with a top speed of 90 km/h (56 mph). However, by the time the trams were delivered in 1956, the expansion plans had been abandoned apart from a short expansion of line 2 completed the same year. As a result, the RM 2 trams were never used for the purpose for which they were optimised for.

All RM 2 trams had couplers for towing two-axle trailers. In 1958 one four-axle trailer, number 141, was built by the TuKL workshop. Unlike the existing trailers it was equipped with an automatic Scharfenberg coupler, and RM 2 48 was fitted with a similar coupler to tow it. During the first year in service the 48+141 combination was used on line 2, after that on line 1 during rush hour.

== Service history ==
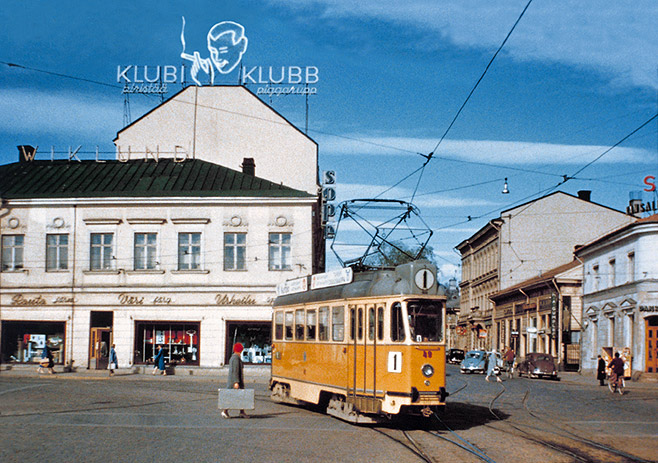
No. 49 on line 1 in May 1959

The RM 2 class were delivered in 1956 and initially used on all three Turku tram lines. However, it soon turned out that they were too long to pass each other on some curves along the circular line 3, and they were restricted to lines 1 and 2.

The active service of the RM 2 class was short-lived as the Turku tram network closed between 1967 and 1972. Line 1 closed in 1967, leaving the RM 2s to run only on line 2. In 1971 the inner circle of line 3 (3A) was closed down. This would have made it possible to utilize the RM 2s on the remaining 3B, but this was not done. As a result, the RM 2 class was withdrawn on 1 June 1972 when line 2 closed. Tram operations continued on line 3B until 1 October 1972, utilising older rolling stock dating from the 1930s and early 1950s.

== Fate after withdrawal from service ==
TuKL negotiated with several existing tram operators about the sale of the RM 2 trams, only 16 years old when withdrawn, including Helsinki City Transport (HKL), the sole tram operator in Finland after the closure of the Turku network. Although the RM 2 trams were similar to the HM IV, RM 1, HM V and RM 3 trams used in Helsinki, they were narrower, which would have necessitated modifications to utilize them in Helsinki. Additionally HKL was about to take delivery of 40 state-of-the-art articulated trams during 1973–75, which meant they had little use for trams based on older technology.

After not finding a purchaser, the city sold the RM 2's for scrap at a loss. Five of the eight trams were sold to Laihon romuliike, where they were scrapped. The remaining three were given to different societies for preservation; 52 to Merimieslähetysseura, 53 to the Finnish Tramway Society and 55 to the Museum of Technology, Helsinki. All three were stored outdoors in different locations and were so badly vandalised that they were scrapped in the 1970s and 1980s.

== See also ==
- Trams in Finland
