= Turku International School =

School in Turku, Finland

Coordinates: 60.447417°N 22.358076°E

- Varissuo; Turku; Finland

Information
- Established: August 2003; 22 years ago
- Language: English
- Website: sites.utu.fi/tis/

Turku International School is an international school in Turku, Finland, located in the eastern district of Varissuo. It was established in August 2003, and is maintained by the City of Turku. Notably it does not have its own faculty, but teaching is undertaken by the University's teacher training school. The official language of the school is English (most people speak Finnish). Around half the 200 students are of foreign nationality.

It currently temporarily operates within the premises of Turun normaalikoulu, but will soon get its own building in Varissuo. The school offers three programmes: a primary (years 1–4) and secondary (years 5–9) years programme, and the International Baccalaureate Diploma Programme (in cooperation with Turun normaalikoulu). The first two are based on the Finnish national curriculum and the International Baccalaureate's Primary Years Programme (PYP) and Middle Years Programme (MYP) respectively.

The school is intended for foreign-born children living temporarily or permanently in the Turku region and for Finnish children returning to Finland after years abroad.

By an agreement signed between the city of Turku and the University of Turku, Turun normaalikoulu (the Teacher training school of Turku) takes care of the teaching in the international school.
