= Trams in Turku (1908–1972) =

Turku tramway network

Overview
- Locale: Turku, Finland
- Transit type: Tramway
- Number of lines: 4

Operation
- Began operation: 1890 (horse tram), 1908 (electric tram)
- Ended operation: 1892 (horse tram), 1972 (electric tram)

Technical
- Track gauge: 1908–1972: 1,000 mm (3 ft 3 3/8 in)
- Old gauge: 1890–1908: 1,435 mm (4 ft 8 1/2 in)
Turku tram network in its most extensive form after expansion in 1956.
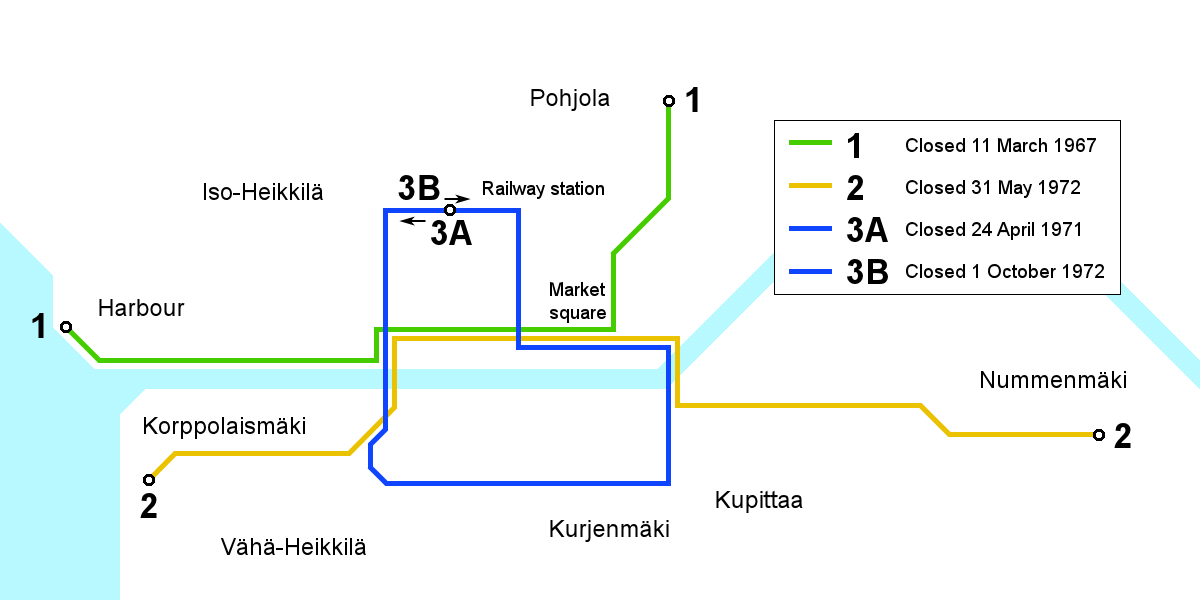

The Turku tramway network was the first tram system to be operated in Finland, and was the second-to-last first generation tram system in Finland. It was operated as horse tramway from 1890 until 1892, and as an electrified tramway from 1908 until 1972. Prior to 1919 the tram system was owned by private interests, and from that year onwards by the City of Turku until closure of the system.

The possible recreation of the tram network and/or a creation of a light rail network have been discussed since the (second) closure of the tram system in 1972. A plan to construct a line between Varissuo and Port of Turku was approved by the city council in 2026, with an expected opening date in 2033.

== History ==
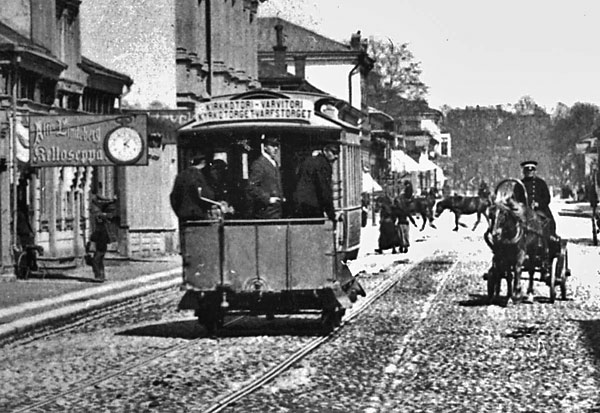
The only known photograph of a horse-drawn tram in Turku.

=== 1890–1892: Horse tramway ===
In 1889 Spårvägsaktiebolaget i Åbo ("Tramway Company in Turku"), led by Count August Armfelt applied for the right to construct a horse-drawn tram line in Turku. The application was positively received in the city council, and already on 4 May 1890 the company opened a tram line between Turku Castle and the city centre. This was the first tram system in Finland, then a Grand Duchy of Finland. Unusually for a tramway system in Finland, the line was built with a track gauge of 1,435 mm (4 ft 8 1/2 in), instead of the broad gauge standard of 1,524 mm (5 ft) or the 1,000 mm (3 ft 3 3/8 in) gauge used on all subsequent Finnish tramways. Although passenger numbers were relatively high, high maintenance costs led to the horse tramway being unprofitable, and it was closed down already on 31 October 1892. The five tramcars owned by Spårvägsaktiebolaget i Åbo were sold to Stockholms Nya Spårvägsaktiebolag, Sweden in 1894.

=== 1908–1919: Privately owned electric tramway ===
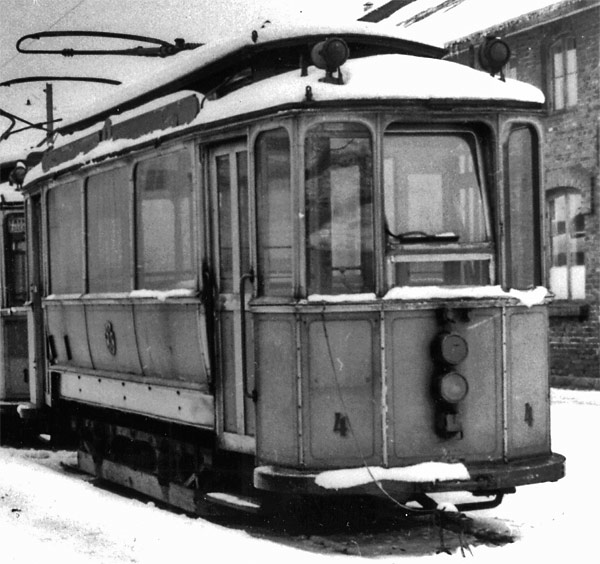
ASEA/AEG-built tram number 4 from 1908, photographed 1952.

Due to the city's population increase, the idea of building a tramway in Turku resurfaced during the first years of the 20th century. Building an electrically powered tramway for the city was first proposed in 1905, but due to the lack of local experience in constructing such a system, foreign companies were selected to construct the service. Germany-based AEG, who also owned the electricity plant in Turku, eventually reached an agreement with the city for building a tram network and operating it for forty years, the city having an option to buy the operations after ten years and thereon between five-year intervals.

The new tram network was built to the 1,000 mm (3 ft 3 3/8 in) used on the Helsinki tram network, and it was opened on 22 December 1908. From the start the new network was much more extensive than the horse tram network, with two lines initially operated; a circular line in the centre of the city and a harbour line connecting the city centre to the Port of Turku. In 1909 the two lines were combined into a single one—this rather complex route arrangement was retained until 1932. The first generation of electric trams in Turku were built by the Swedish ASEA. The new traffic form gained high popularity, and passenger numbers grew steadily until the beginning of World War I.

During World War I the Grand Duke of Finland (aka Tsar Nicholas II of Russia) ordered all German-owned possessions within Finland to be confiscated. Therefore, between 18 August 1914 and 15 June 1918 the Turku tramway was under control of the Turku and Pori County under the name Turun Sähkölaitos. The war resulted in unprecedented growth in passenger numbers, to the extent that there was not enough capacity to carry all potential passengers. Following the end of the war and the subsequent Finnish independence, control of the tramway was returned to Electricitätswerk Åbo AG. However, already on 15 April 1919 the City of Turku purchased the highly profitable tram operations for itself.

=== 1919–1943: Expansion ===
In 1920, soon after the city took over the tram operations, an explosion at the electric plant resulted in the death of seven people, as well as large-scale damage to the plant itself. As a result, the distribution of electricity was disturbed, and the tram network was inoperative due to lack of power for 87 days. Plans were made during the earlier half of the 1920s for expansion of the tram network, but the poor post-war financial situation meant these could not be realised.

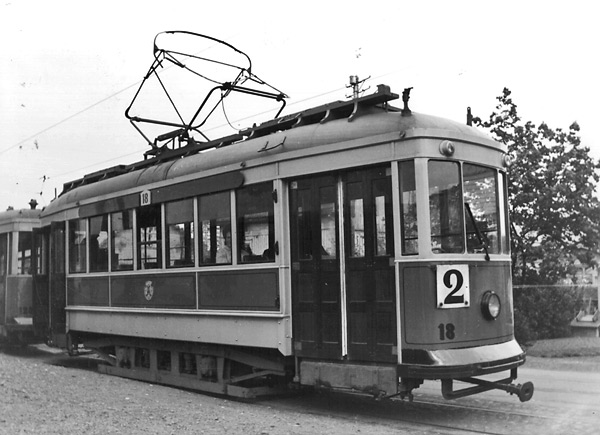
ASEA/AEG built tram 18 from 1933. The last trams of this type were retained in use until the close of the system in 1972.

The first privately owned bus lines appeared in Turku in 1923. During the rest of the decade the number of bus lines grew, resulting in dropping passenger numbers for the tram system. By the end of the decade the tram system was operating at a loss. A committee was set in 1931 to investigate the future of city-maintained public transport in Turku, which recommended that the tram network be expanded and the city should not, for the time being, start its own bus operations. Following the committee's recommendations, plans were drawn to convert the entire tram network to double track and expand it to various directions, doubling the track lineage. This also meant the creation of three separate lines. The construction of the expansions started in 1932, when two new extensions of the network were opened, resulting in the creation of three separate lines. A fourth line is also said to have existed at some point during the first half of the 1930s, but reports about it are fragmentary and conflicting. Further expansions to the network were built during 1933 and 1934. The expansion of the tram network resulted in higher passenger numbers, which necessitated the acquisition of new rolling stock. Prior to acquisition of the new trams a poll was held amongst tram passengers to decide the colour of the new trams. The traditional yellow colour won the vote, scoring 724 votes against the second favourite, dark blue with 208 votes. To cover for a temporary shortage of rolling stock before new trams were delivered, five trams were rented from Helsinki during the years 1931–1938.

Further expansion of the network occurred in 1938 and 1940. The 1940 expansion resulted in the combination of lines 2 and 3 into a single line, which changed numbers halfway through the route. The two-designation system was necessitated by the fact that the new 2/3 line spooled back into itself, with the end of the line stop for "line 3" being located along the route of "line 2". Tram operations continued throughout World War II, with passenger numbers greatly exceeding those during peace-time.

=== 1944–1959: Decline ===
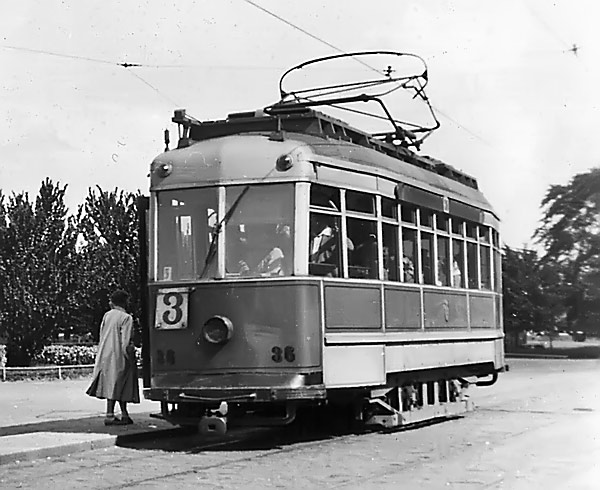
Trams number 34–37 were built while wartime restrictions were still in place and the quality of this tram type was poor.

While the war still continued, new trams were built for Turku in 1944. Following the end of the war passenger numbers started declining rapidly, which meant the tram operations were making loss by the end of the decade. In 1950 an experiment was carried out to give up having separate conductors in trams and have the driver sell tickets in order to cut costs. Although the city transport department was pleased with the experiment, it was terminated within the same year partially due to pressure from the tram staff. During the same year the city decided to start its own bus operations. Despite this the city continued to be committed to the tram operations, and during the early 1950s the rail lineage was improved and new trams were acquired. In 1951 lines 2 and 3 were split, resulting in the creation of a circular line 3.

As the 1950s progressed the general opinion started turning against tram traffic, following the general trend of the time. The termination of tram traffic by 1980 was first proposed in 1952 by architect Olavi Laisaari of the city planning department in a proposal for general guidelines for city planning. The proposal was at the time rejected. In 1954 a committee led by vice-city executive Öyvind Stadius came to the conclusion that trams were an impractical solution for a city of Turku's size, but nevertheless recommended maintaining the tram network as large investment were made to it. During the 1950s and 60s the decisions for the future of the tram network were largely a struggle between Laisaari and Stadius for termination of tram traffic on one side, and the leader of the traffic department Pentti Savolainen (Stadius' subordinate) for development of tram traffic on the other side. Despite the statements against the tram network, the city traffic department made large-scale plans for expansion of the tram network during the 1950s, including light rail lines connecting Turku with neighbouring cities Raisio and Kaarina, which would have greatly increased the profitability of the tram system. Unfortunately these were not realised, apart from a short expansion of line 2 completed in 1956 with a light rail -type track entirely separated from street traffic. Also in 1956 the traffic department acquired new RM 2 -type four-axle trams. Although the city had decided not to build the proposed light rail lines, these so-called "ghost cars" were designed to be usable on light rail lines.

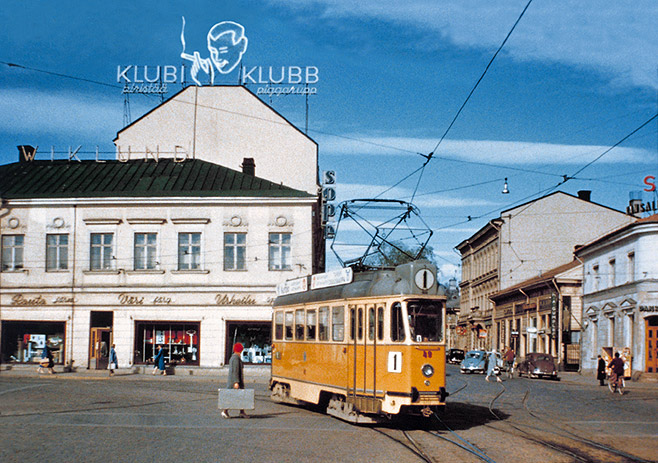
A Valmet RM 2 tram photographed in Turku market square in 1959.

During the latter part of the 50s passenger numbers started declining again, and a committee formed in 1959 found that under the current financial circumstances the expansion of the tram network was impossible to realise. However, the committee also stated the expansion of the network was necessary in the long run, and the needs of light rail lines should be taken into account in city planning. Additionally the committee suggested, again, ceasing the usage of conductors in trams in favour of ticket-selling by the driver in order to cut costs. By this time the city decision-makers were uninterested in developing or even maintaining the tram network, and as a result the committee's recommendations were not acted on.

=== 1960–1972: Termination ===
By the beginning of the 1960s it was clear that the tram network could become profitable again only if it was expanded to the more lucrative suburban routes dominated by the private bus operators. Additionally, most of the rolling stock dated from before or during World War II, and were nearing the end of their lifespan, which meant that sizeable investment would be needed to keep the trams operational. In 1961 the traffic department proposed the acquisitions of new four-axle trams, but the proposal was left untreated by the technical committee until the traffic department would make a proposal for the future of the tram system. As a result, Pentti Savolainen proposed the gradual closure of the tram system by 1980, synchronising the closure of different lines with the retirement of the then-current tram staff. Six new four-axle trams would have been required for this plan to be realised. No actual reason was given why the tram system should be closed.

Savolainen's closure plan was eagerly accepted by the technical committee and forwarded to the city council. The council however turned down the proposal. At the same time the requests for funds for even the most basic maintenance of the tram network were also turned down. Subsequently, Savolainen submitted a proposal for termination of tram traffic by 1972, as continuing traffic after that time was not viable without some investment in track maintenance and the rolling stock. However, earlier closure would not be possible due to the need to find new jobs for the tram staff. Additionally the closure of the tram system would require investment in 75–80 diesel-powered buses. None of the preceding or subsequent proposals for replacement of the tram system with buses included an objective comparison between the expenses of tram and bus operations. Each proposal simply presumed that buses were cheaper, without looking further into the matter.

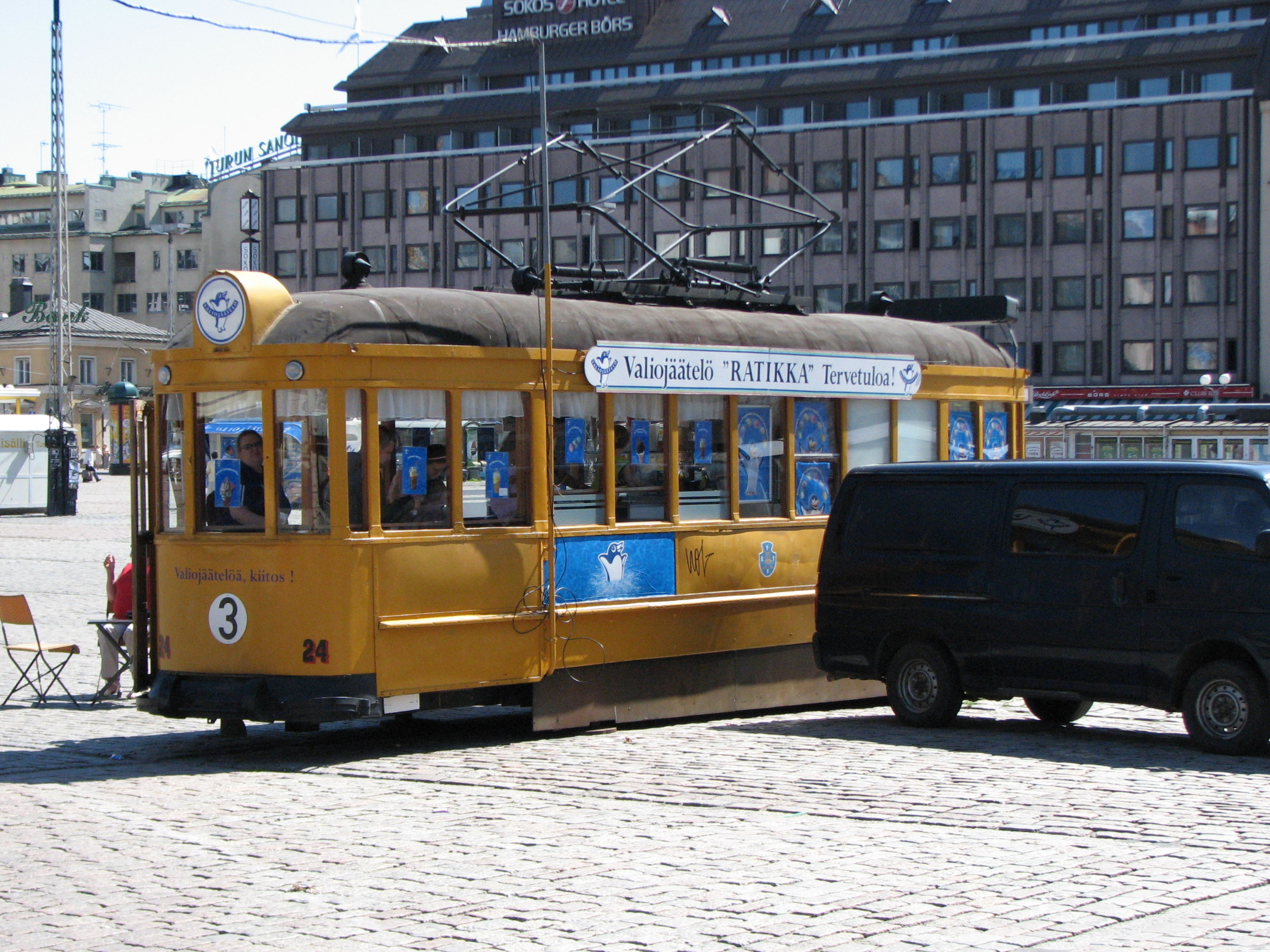
A SAT/AEG -built tram from 1934 serving as an ice cream bar in Turku Market Square is one of the surviving Turku trams. The livery of the tram when photographed does not correspond with the original.

Starting from 1962, several committees were formed to plan the termination of tram traffic, most of which simply followed Savolainen's second termination proposal. At the same time the future of city-maintained public transport was a source of conflict in the city council, where the rightist parties wanted to leave public transport entirely for private operators, while the leftist parties wanted the city to continue operating public transport lines with buses. Even though the city council on the whole agreed that tram traffic should be terminated, it wasn't until 1965 that the decision was made to terminate line 1 on 11 March 1967, due to the "life-threatening" condition of its tracks. No decision was made about the future of other lines however.

Following the termination of line 1 in 1967, two additional committees was set to investigate the future of the city's public transport department, but neither arrived at any new conclusions. In 1969 the decision was made to terminate traffic on line 3 in 1970, but due to delays in delivering the new buses and other difficulties, in the end only line 3A (the inner circle on circular line 3) was terminated, a year behind schedule on 24 April 1971. During the same year the decision was made to convert line 2 into bus traffic in 1972 and line 3B in 1973. Traffic on line 2 ended on 31 May 1972 and finally line 3B (the outer circle on line 3) was closed ahead of schedule on 1 October 1972. During the last day of operations all trams in traffic were full with passengers wishing to give their farewells – some even decorated the trams with flowers. The last tram—carrying nearly two hundred passengers although certified for only 50—departed from the terminus stop on 23:30 Eastern European Time, and completed its circle at 23:54, marking the end of tram service in Turku.

Although the conversion into bus traffic was believed to be an answer to making the city-operated public transport system profitable again, this was not in fact the case and the operations continued making even larger losses until the city's public transport system was reorganised in the 1990s. The termination of tram traffic also led to a drop in passenger numbers on the city-operated public transport network, despite the growth of the city that took place at the same time.

=== Rolling stock ===
Apart from the last tram type acquired in 1956, the trams used in Turku had no official type designations, possibly owing to the uniformity of the rolling stock.

Motor trams
Numbers	Builder	Type	In service	Notes	Surviving trams
1–13	ASEA/AEG	–	1908–1953	Five additional trams were rented from Helsinki 1931–1938.	1
14, 15	NWF/AEG	–	1921–1954		None
16–23	ASEA/AEG	–	1933–1972		2
24–33	Suomen Autoteollisuus/AEG	–	1934–1972	First trams ever to be built in Finland.	2
34–37	Suomen Autoteollisuus/AEG	–	1944–1967		None
38–47	Karia/Strömberg	–	1951–1972		1
48–55	Valmet/Tampella/Strömberg	RM 2	1956–1972	Built with usage on light rail lines in mind. Nicknamed "ghost cars".	None
