= Norssi =

Norssi is the informal name of various schools in Finland:

- Helsingin normaalilyseo in Helsinki
- Turun normaalikoulu in Turku
- Oulun normaalikoulu in Oulu
