= SpåraKoff =

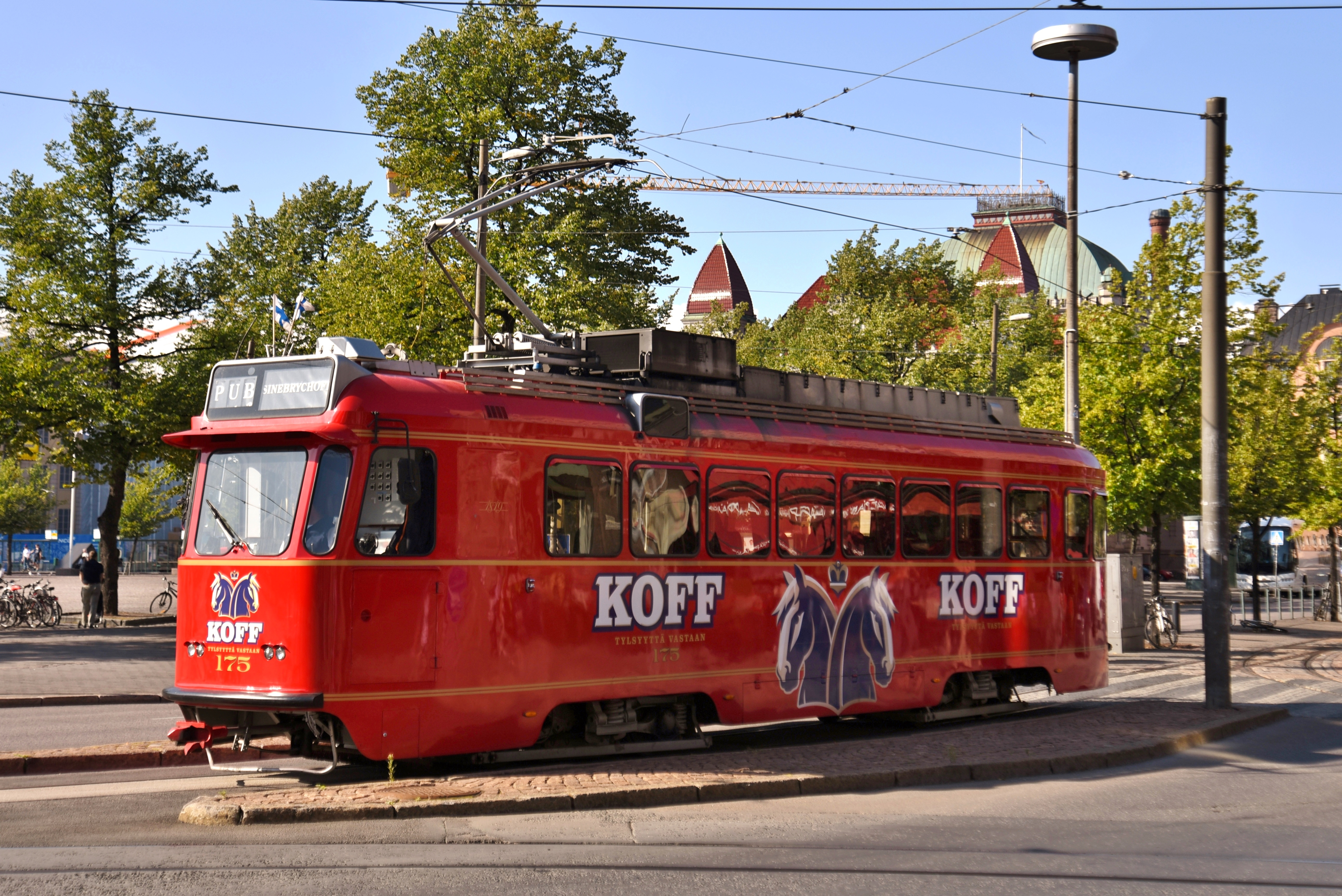
- SpåraKoff departing from Railway Square

- Location within Helsinki (mainland)

Restaurant information
- Established: April 30, 1995
- Owners: Sinebrychoff, HOK-Elanto, HKL
- Location: Helsinki, Finland
- Coordinates: 60.1710187°N 24.9450463°E
- Seating capacity: 24 seats 6 standing places
- Reservations: Available

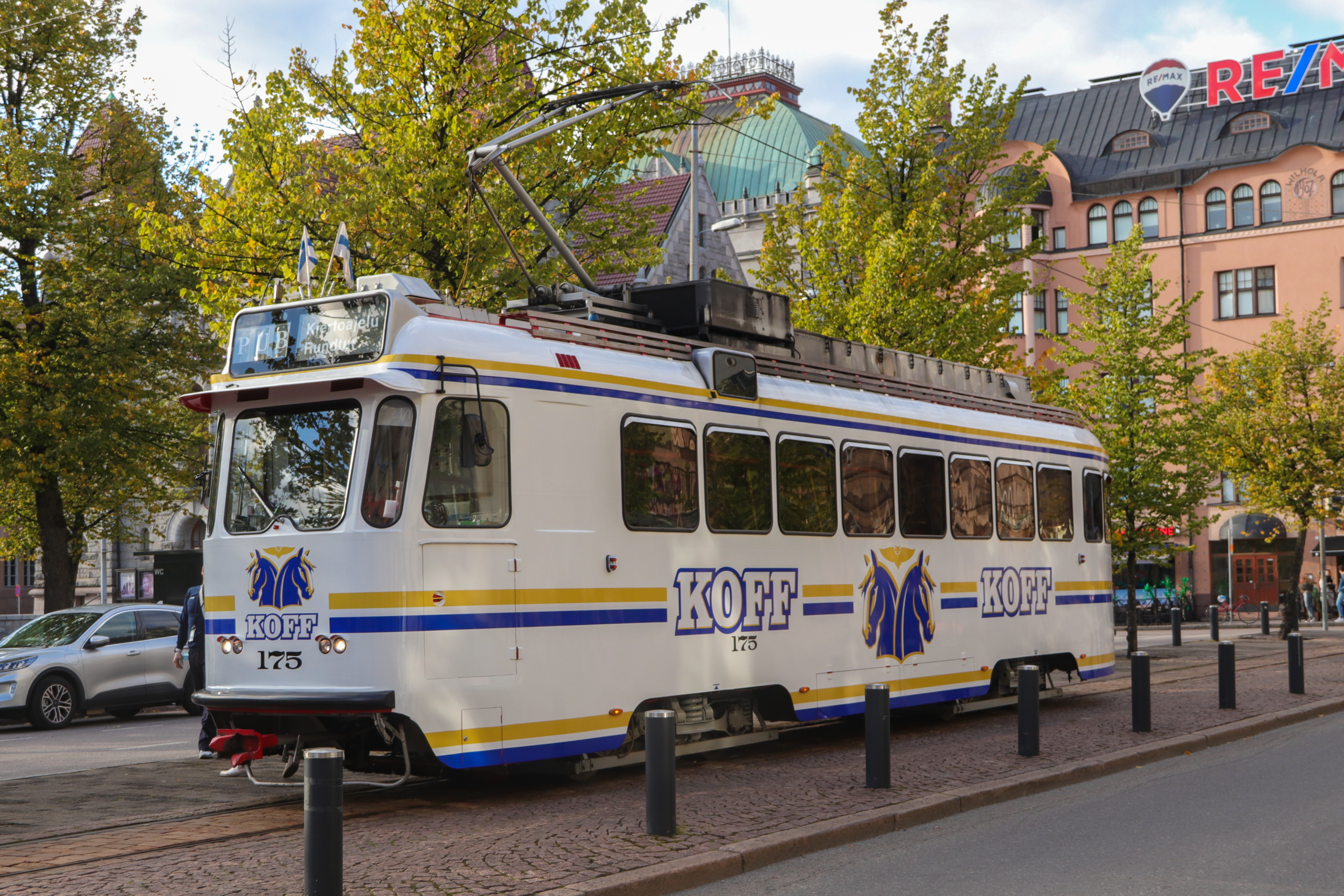
The SpåraKoff was temporarily repainted white from June to September 2021.

SpåraKoff is a HM V type tram converted into a mobile bar in Helsinki, Finland. Known as the pub tram, the vehicle does circular tours of downtown Helsinki picking up passengers for a fee during summer months. It is operated jointly by Sinebrychoff, HOK-Elanto (part of the S Group), and Helsinki City Transport.

The pub tram is immediately distinguishable in the Helsinki traffic by its vivid red colour (as opposed to the normal colours, green and cream, used on the Helsinki tram network of the Helsinki City Transport), and by the destination board that reads "PUB".

It is one of the four HM V trams that remain operational in Helsinki. Two of them are museum trams, and one is used as a non-passenger carrying advertisement tram.

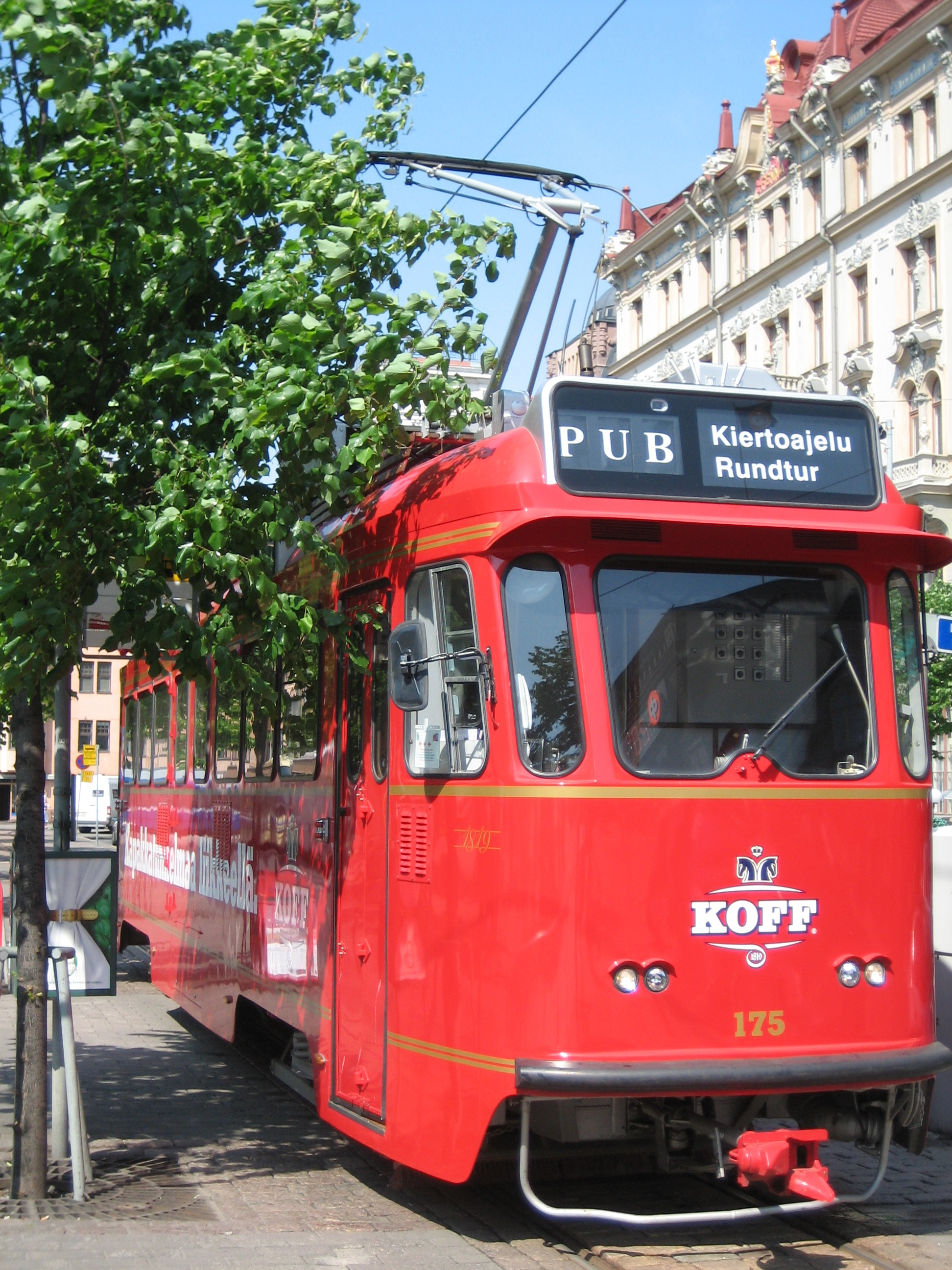
SpåraKoff Tram Pub, awaiting passengers at the Mikonkatu terminus stop at the Helsinki Railway Square

== Etymology ==
The name "SpåraKoff" is a combination of spåra ("tram", in Helsinki slang, from the Swedish word spårvagn "tram") (Note: Although the letter å is part of the Finnish alphabet, native Finnish does not use it, and in commonly used Helsinki slang, the word for "tram" is spelled spora. However, the official spelling of SpåraKoff's name retains the å from the original Swedish word spårvagn.) and the beer brand "Koff", produced by the Sinebrychoff Brewery — the oldest brewery in Scandinavia and one of the largest in Finland.

== History ==
The SpåraKoff was remodelled from an old HM V tram in 1995, to commemorate the 175th anniversary of Sinebrychoff. HM V number 15 was selected as the tram to be converted, and it was renumbered no. 175 in honour of the anniversary. The SpåraKoff started its operation on Walpurgis night's eve, 1995.

The SpåraKoff has an area of 20 square metres (220 sq ft). It has seats for 24 customers, a counter and a lavatory. The lavatory is so small it had to be ordered from a company that builds cabins for cruise ships. The remodelling was done by Helsinki City Transport. Originally the SpåraKoff was only supposed to be in operation for two years, but it turned out to be so popular that it continues its operations today. When it started, it was the only one of its kind in the world.

== Operation ==
In 2015, the SpåraKoff operates from 4 May to 5 September. A tour ("pub crawl") takes approximately 40 minutes, travelling from the Helsinki Railway Square to Kallio, Töölö, and the Market Square, while its passengers enjoy their drinks. The route has the following stops: Rautatientori, Linnanmäki, Oopperatalo, Aleksanterinkatu and Kauppatori. In addition to running its scheduled public tours, the tram is available to operate charter services.

According to The Guardian, the SpåraKoff's seats are not comfortable, but its scheduled route covers most of Helsinki's usual sights, its drinks are reasonably priced, and there is no irritating commentary. Most of the drinks served on board are either beer or Lonkero, a recommended "long drink" made from gin and grapefruit soda; there is also a frequently changing wine list.

== Technical information ==
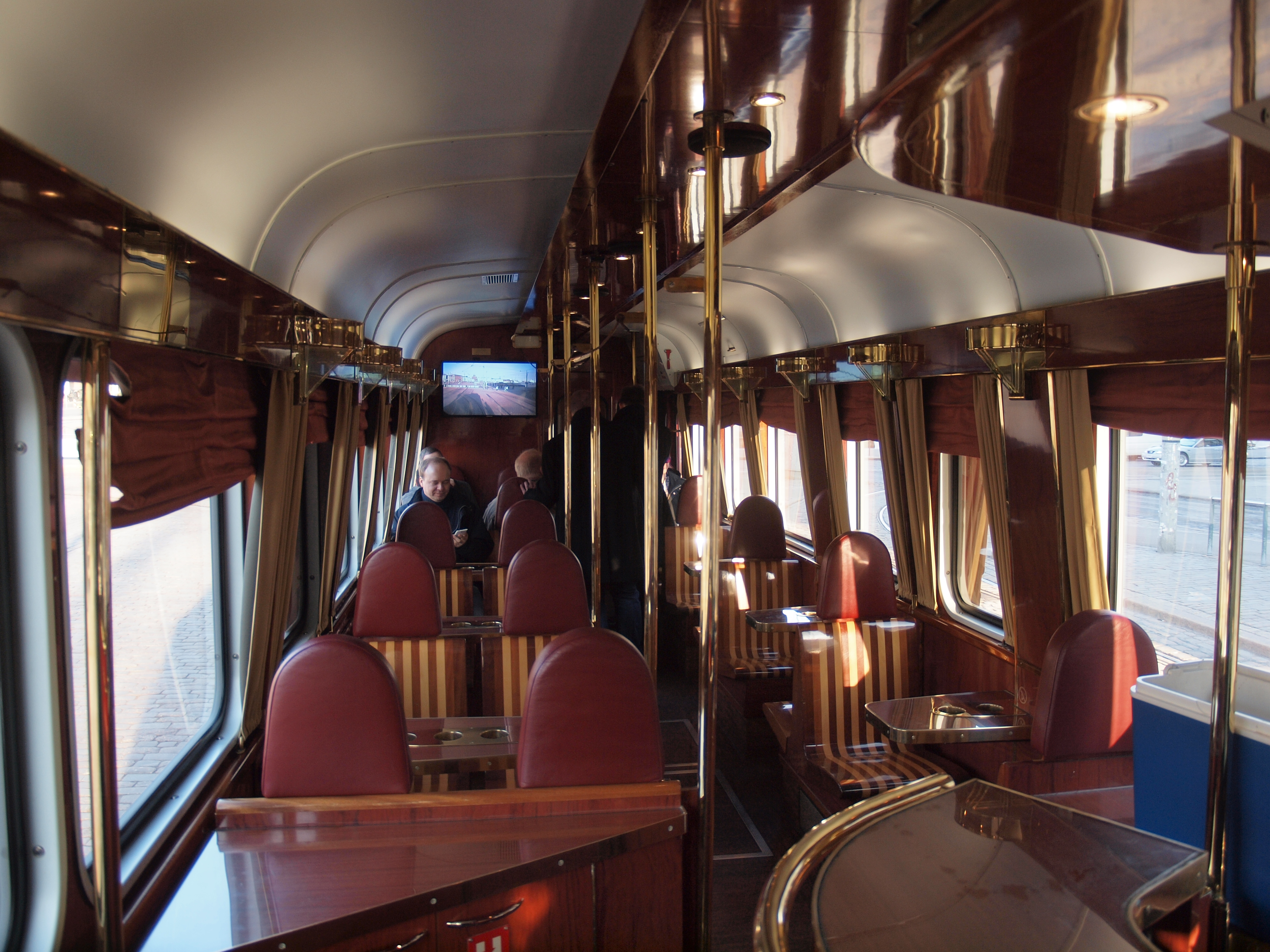
Inside the SpåraKoff pub tram

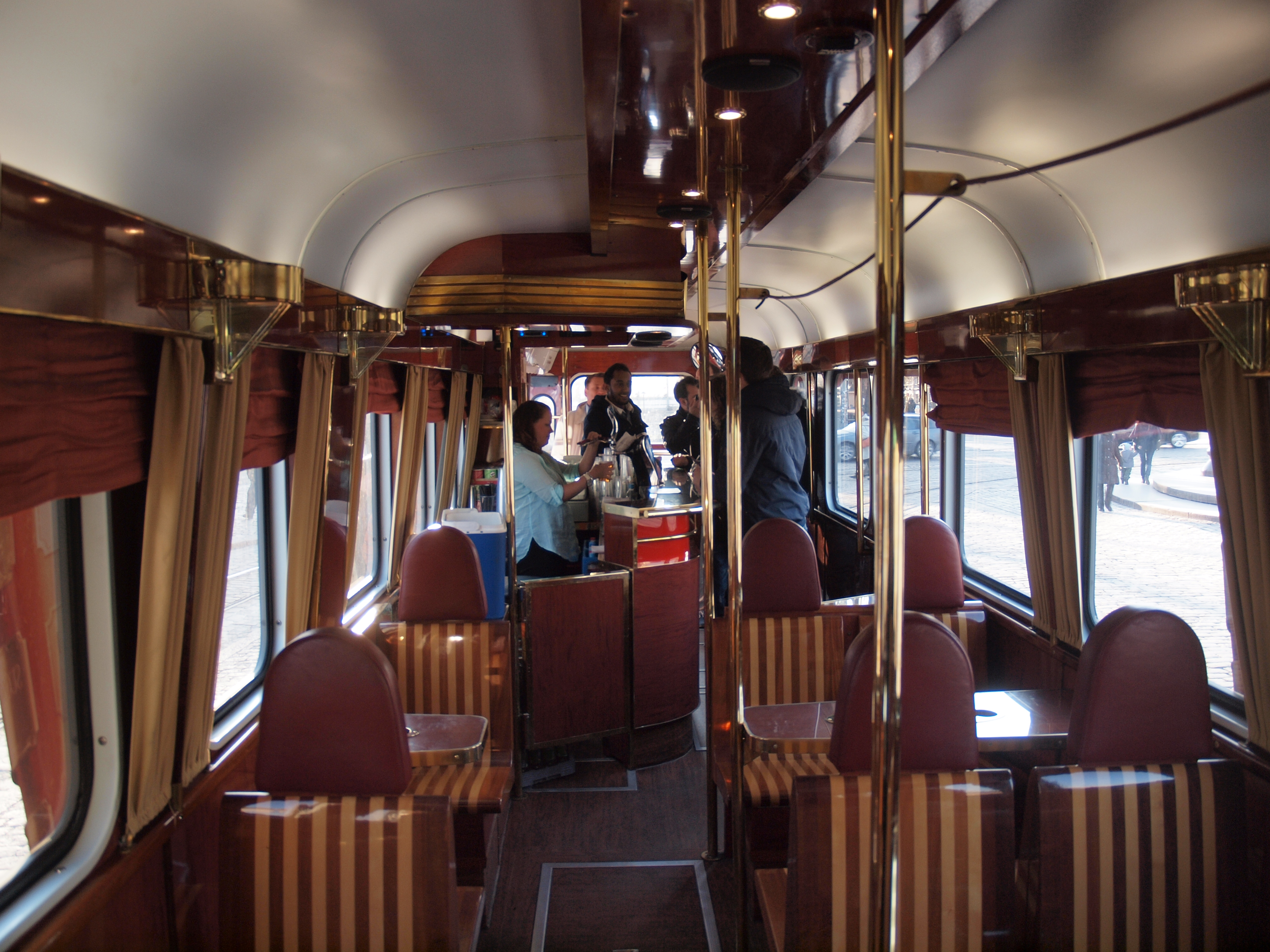
Inside the SpåraKoff pub tram

The tram has two bogies and was originally constructed in 1959. The conversion for pub use (including the addition of a toilet) was carried out in 1995.

- Width: 2.3 metres (7 ft 7 in), height: 3.6 metres (11 ft 10 in)
- Track gauge: 1 metre (3.3 ft)
- Total mass: 20 tonnes (44,000 lb)
- Top speed: 60 kilometres per hour (37 mph)
- Acceleration: 12.6 s (0–50 km/h)
- Capacity: 24 seats, 6 standing places, one flush toilet (WC)
- Beer serving capacity: ca. 500 pints per filling

The tram is staffed by one driver and one bartender serving customers.

== SpåraKoff in Taiwan ==
A copy of SpåraKoff, converted from an abandoned HKL 23 tram, was shown at the Taipei Expo exhibition in Taiwan from November to December 2000 for nine days at the Finnish pavilion. The interior of the tram ran computer simulators showing a view of Virtual Finland. Thus tram visitors could feel like they were on a tram cruise in Helsinki. The interior also included tables, benches and a bar. The tram was converted to this use in Taipei. After the exhibition the tram remained in Taiwan, making it the only tram in the country, until a light rail system was opened in Kaohsiung in 2016.

== See also ==
- Colonial Tramcar Restaurant in Melbourne, Australia
- Trams in Helsinki
- Trams in Finland
