= Varissuomi =

Form of the Finnish language

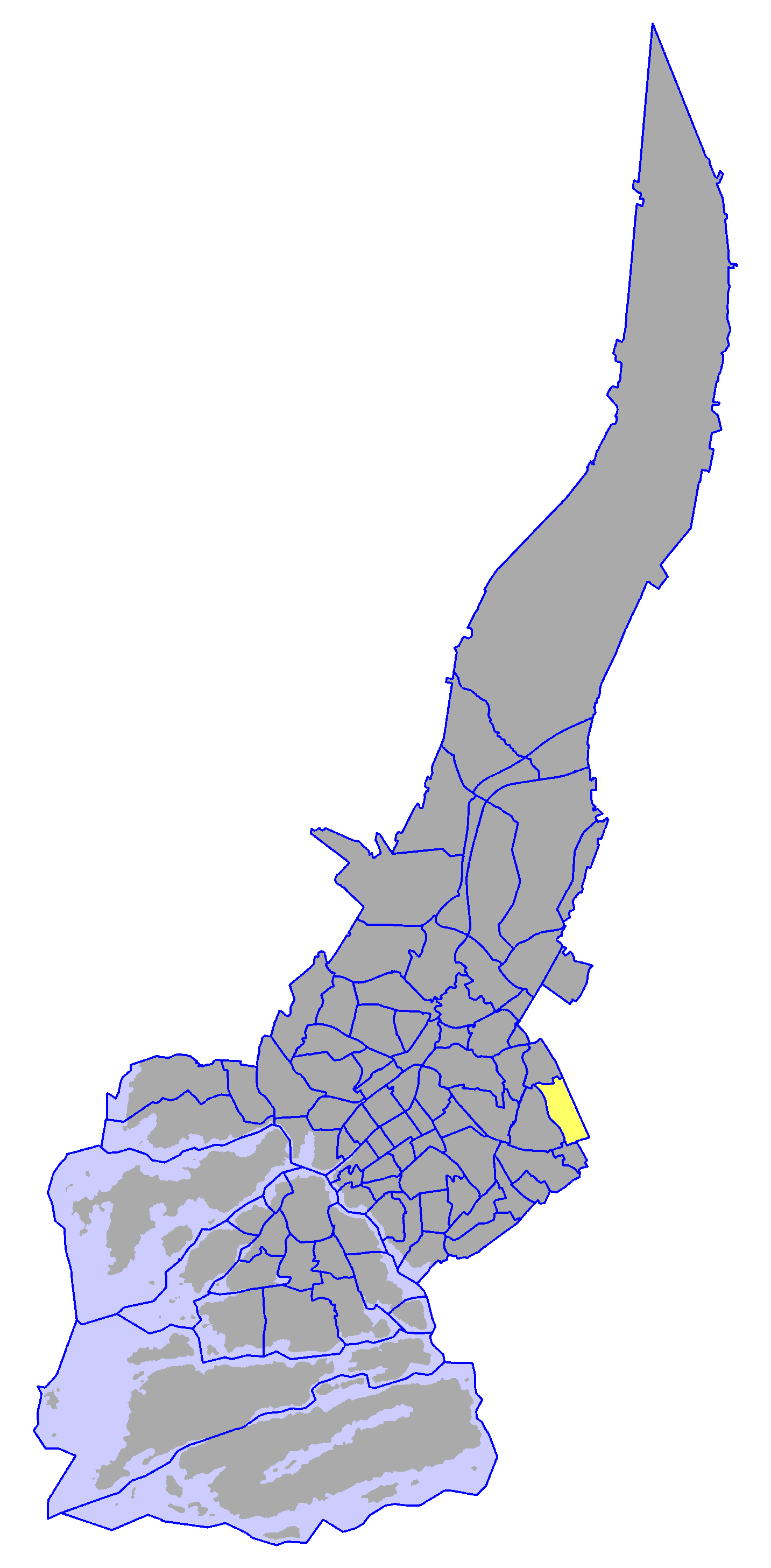
Varissuo in the city of Turku, Finland

Varissuomi (lit. 'crow Finnish'), sometimes also referred to in some sources as "huono suomi" ('bad Finnish') or more recently as ”Varissuo slang”, is a group of distinct forms of the Finnish language which have developed recently among the youth of Varissuo, the largest suburb of Turku, Finland. They contain very simplified grammars, very limited vocabularies and many loanwords from foreign languages. Varissuomi is primarily used by the younger generations of foreign families who speak different languages to communicate between each other, although some have started using English instead.

These forms of speech have also been used by residents of Varissuo who have an ethnically Finnish background.

== History ==
Varissuo has a high amount of individuals with a foreign background, being up to 90% of those who are recently starting school. For many young students, the only place where Finnish is used is school, leading to a weakened understanding of standard Finnish. This has caused to the communities to start using distinct forms of Finnish, collectively called "Varissuomi", containing very small vocabularies with very simple grammar.

It has not been studied.

== Status ==
There have been many proposals to make immigrant communities around Varissuo learn standard Finnish, including the idea to replace Swedish classes with Finnish classes, or more radical ones such as forcefully moving students into other schools to expose them into standard Finnish.

Members of the Finns Party have expressed fears of Varissuomi also spreading more into ethnic Finnish communities.

== See also ==
- Broken English
- Creole language
- Pidgin
