= Runosmäki =

District and suburb of Turku, Finland

Coordinates: 60°29′25″N 22°15′22″E

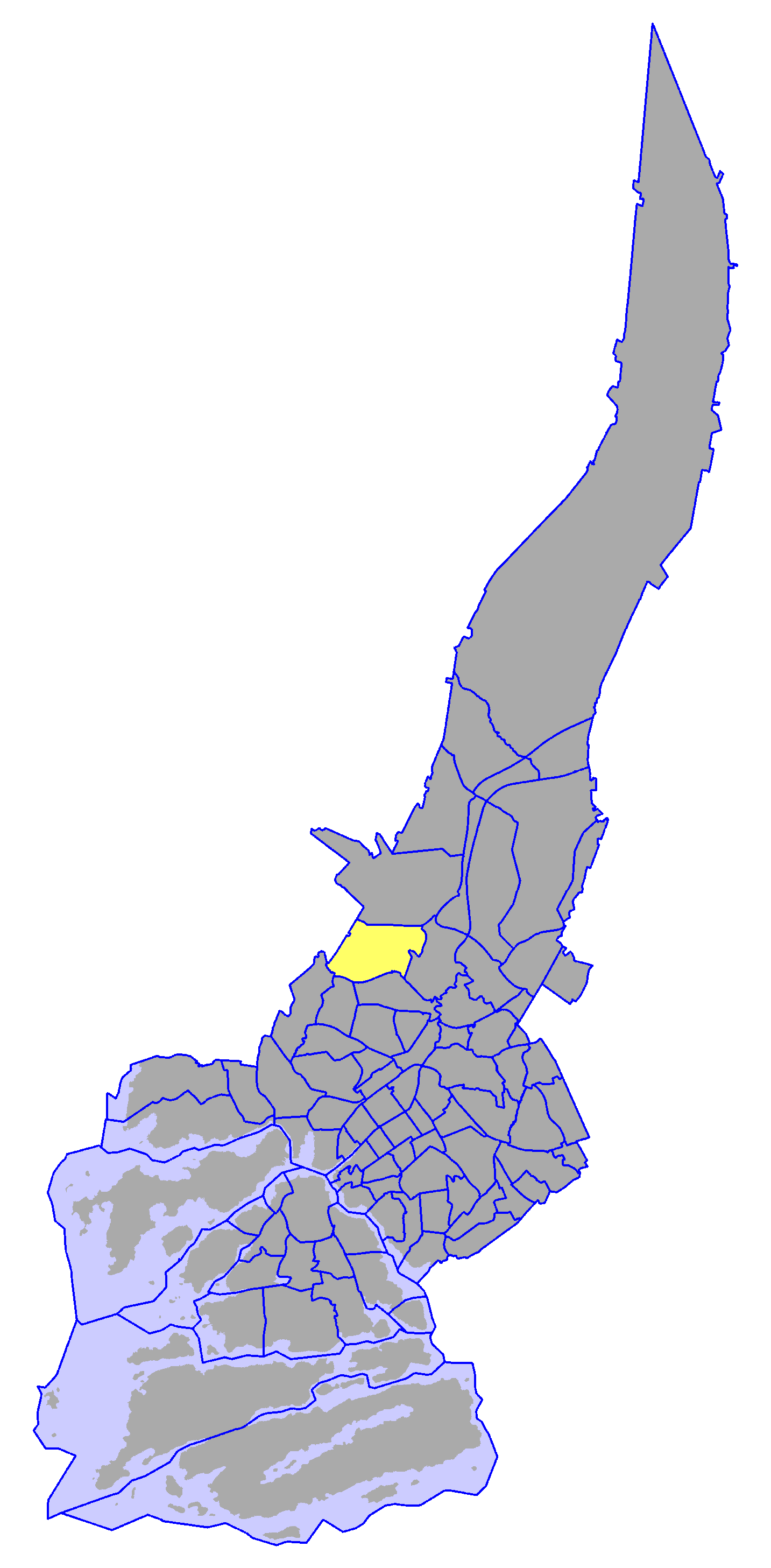
Runosmäki on a map of Turku.

Runosmäki (Swedish Runosbacken) is a district and a suburb of the city of Turku, Finland, located approximately six kilometres to the north of the city centre. It is the largest district in the city, with a population of 10,296 (as of 2004). However, the area of the district also includes the nearby suburb of Länsinummi in addition to Runosmäki proper, which has a population of about 8,200 and thus it is only the second-largest suburb of Turku, after Varissuo.

The district's annual population growth is 0.42%. 13.42% of its population is aged under 15, while 16.78% are over 65 years old. About ten percent of the population are aged between 50 and 54, and Runosmäki has one of the highest median ages in Turku. The district's linguistic makeup is 91.82% Finnish, 1.60% Swedish, and 6.58% other.

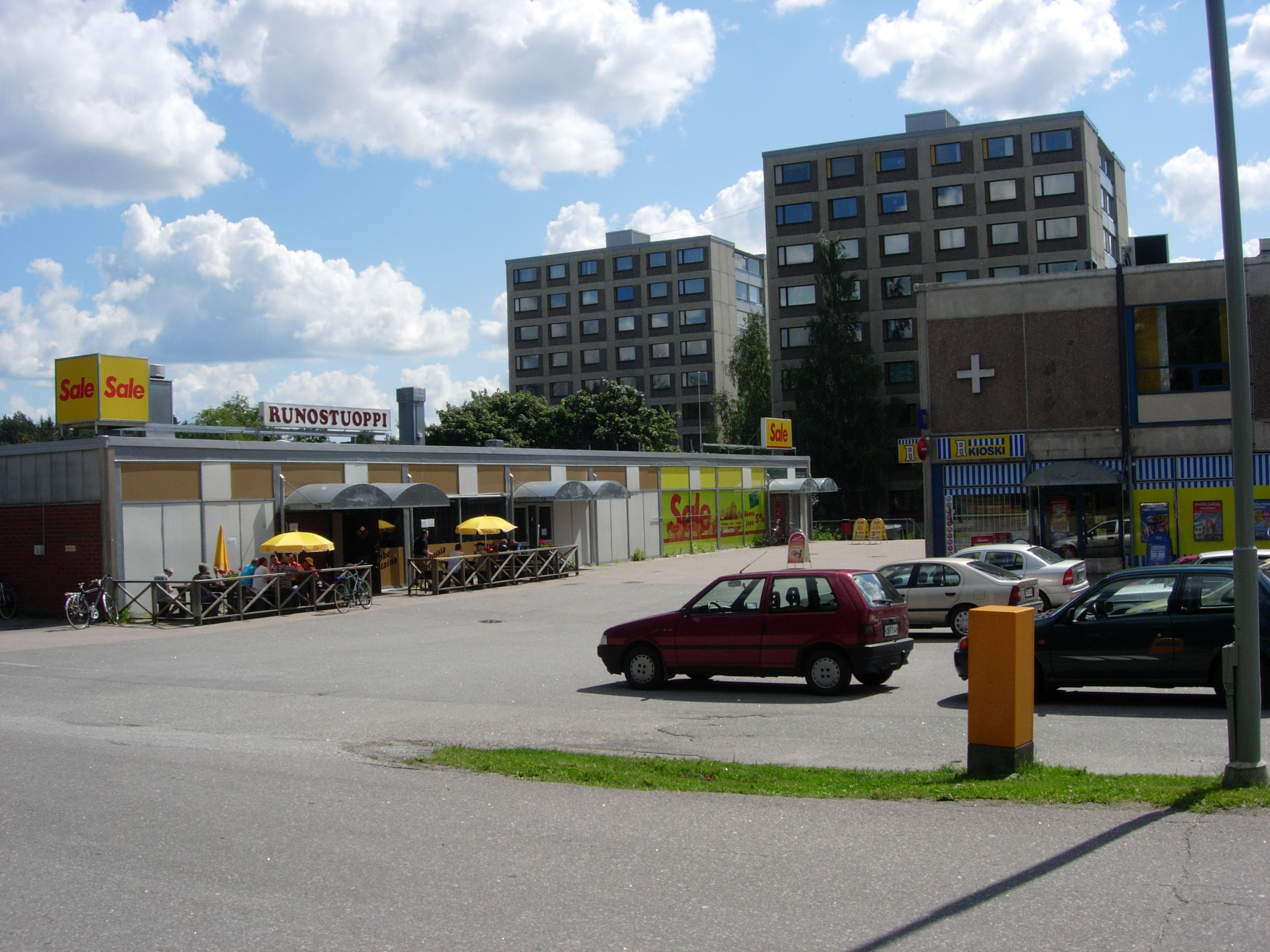
Runosmäki in 2008

Runosmäki is mostly composed of apartment blocks built in the 1970s. The services in the suburb include several schools, a library, a health centre, sports facilities and an old people's home.

Notable people from Runosmäki

- Albion Ademi, professional football player
- Lukas Hradecky, professional football player for Bayer Leverkusen, and the captain of the Finland national football team
- Kaan Kairinen, professional football player for Sparta Prague and the Finland national football team
- Joni Kauko, professional football player
- Elli Pikkujämsä, professional football player for Racing Louisville, Finland women's national football team, Youth Olympic medalist in snowboarding.
