= Varissuo =

Varissuo Varissuo (Finnish), Kråkkärret (Swedish)
- District of Turku
- Interactive map of Varissuo
- Coordinates: 60°26′N 22°20′E
- Country: Finland
- Region: Southwest Finland
- City: Turku
- Established: 1970s

Area
  - Total: 1.112 km^{2} (0.429 sq mi)

Population
  - Total: 9,000 (approx.)
  - Density: 8,100/km^{2} (21,000/sq mi)
- Postal code: 20610

Varissuo (/ˈvɑrɪs.suo/ VAH-ris-suo; Finnish: Varissuo [ˈʋɑris.suo]; Swedish: Kråkkärret (/ˈkrɔːkˌɕærːɛt/) is a district and the largest suburb of the city of Turku, in Finland. It is located seven kilometres to the east of the city centre, and is the easternmost major suburb of Turku, bordering on the neighbouring city of Kaarina. Varissuo has 9,000 inhabitants, the majority of whom are foreign immigrants. It is thus the second largest district of Turku, after Runosmäki. The name consists of the words varis, meaning "crow" and suo, meaning "bog" or "swamp".

15.72% of Varissuo's population are under 15 years old, while 12.56% are over 65. Around 60% of the population speaks an immigrant language, reflecting the suburb's wide cultural variety. 90% of students at Varissuo school speak a mother tongue other than Finnish or Swedish. The suburb was constructed from scratch on an area of previously uninhabited wetland (suo in Finnish) starting in the mid-1970s as migration from rural areas to the city increased heavily in volume.

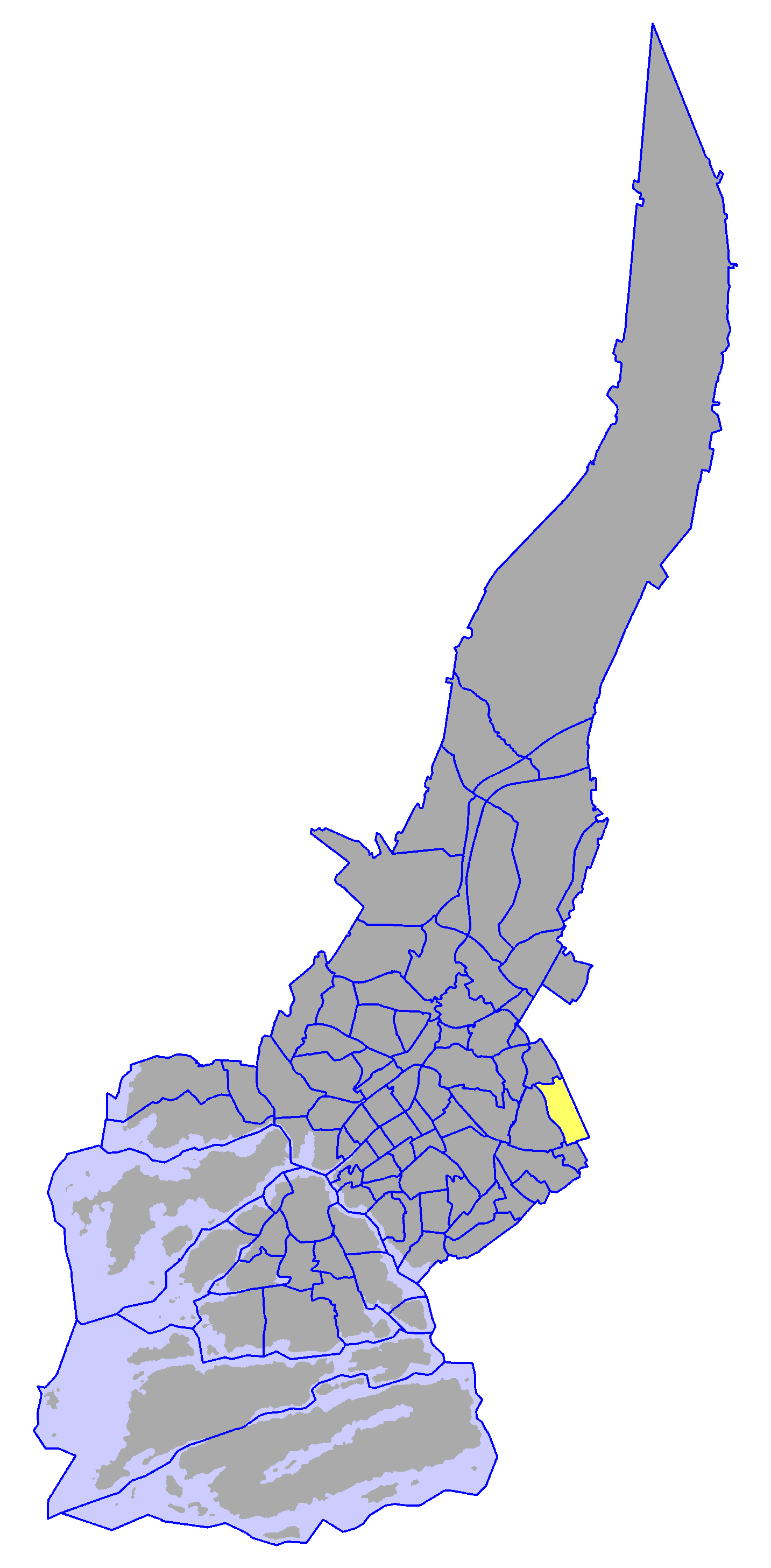
Varissuo on a map of Turku.

Varissuo has several schools, a library, an underground ice arena, a Lutheran church, a health centre, a post office and a social security (KELA) office. In addition, the Itäkeskus shopping centre is located in Varissuo, as well as a University of Turku teacher training school (Turun normaalikoulu) and Turku International School. As many other parts of Turku, Varissuo has many public transport connections, with frequent bus links to the city centre as well as other nearby districts and cities.

Varissuo has a very high percentage of immigrants who lack proficiency in the Finnish language; many speak a form of Finnish known as Varissuomi with simplified grammar and a limited vocabulary.

== History ==
Varissuo is one of Turku’s newer suburbs, developed in the mid-1970s to accommodate the city’s rapidly growing population resulting from migration from rural areas. The district was constructed on previously undeveloped wetland, featuring apartment buildings, schools, health services, and other community facilities designed to create a functional residential area.

Beginning in the late 1980s and continuing through the 1990s and 2000s, Varissuo became a primary settlement area for immigrants and refugees arriving in Finland. Individuals fleeing conflicts and hardships in countries such as Vietnam, Somalia, Iraq, and the former Yugoslavia (Usually Kosovo Albanians or Bosniaks) settled in the district, attracted by affordable housing and proximity to Turku’s city center. The establishment of immigrant communities contributed to Varissuo’s development as one of Finland’s most multicultural districts.

Despite social and economic challenges related to integration, Varissuo remains a vibrant and diverse neighbourhood with active community services and well-developed public transportation connections, continuing to evolve as an integral part of Turku’s urban landscape.

The 10 largest foreign countries of origin in the Varissuo 20610 postal district in 2024;

1. Yugoslavia 972 (7.0%)
2. Iraq 880 (6.4%)
3. Somalia 726 (5.2%)
4. Soviet Union 621 (4.5%)
5. Vietnam 394 (2.8%)
6. Iran 379 (2.7%)
7. Afghanistan 251 (1.8%)
8. Estonia 223 (1.6%)
9. Romania 181 (1.3%)
10. Syria 127 (0.9%)

== Gallery ==
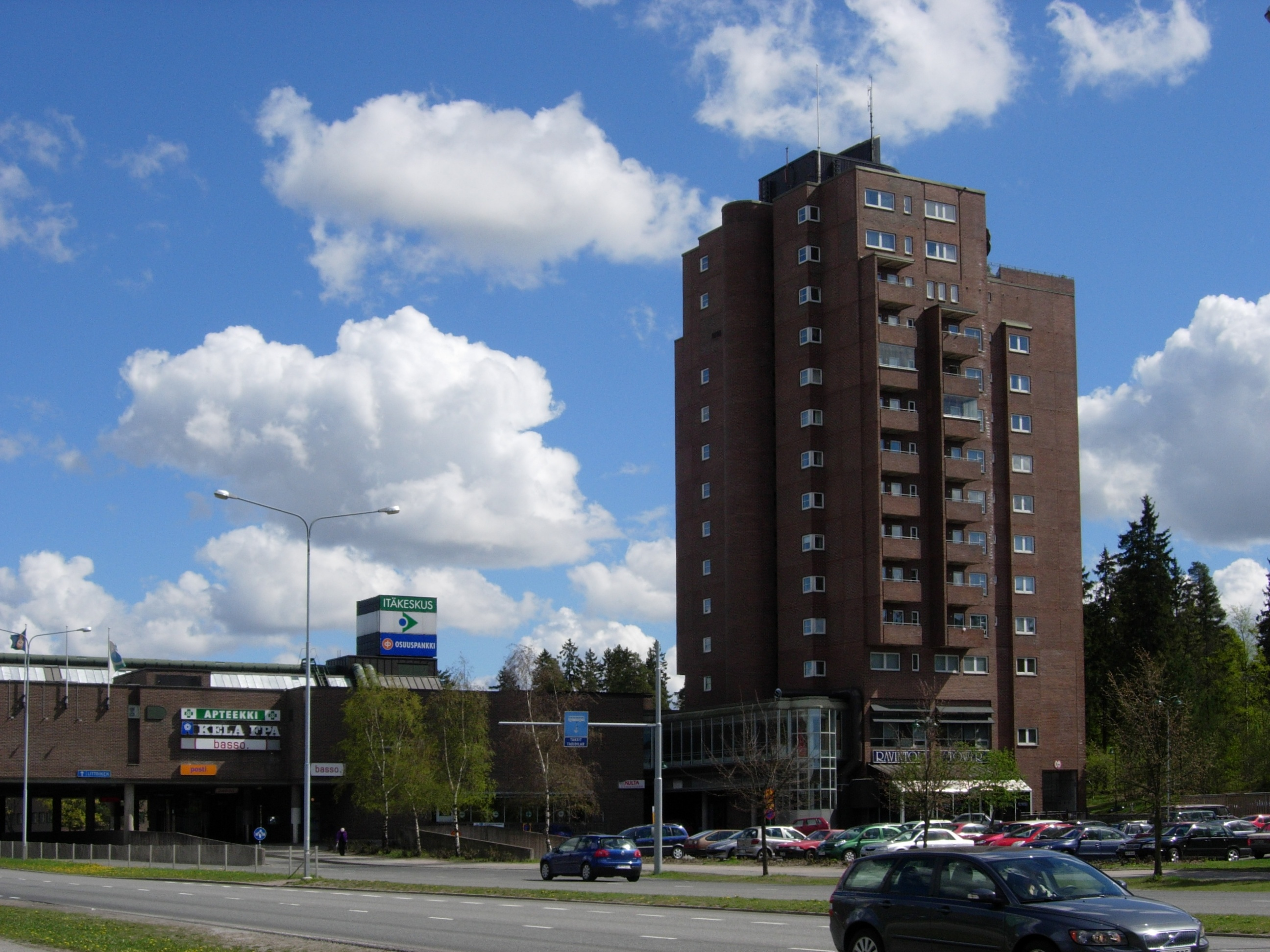
Varissuo East-Centre

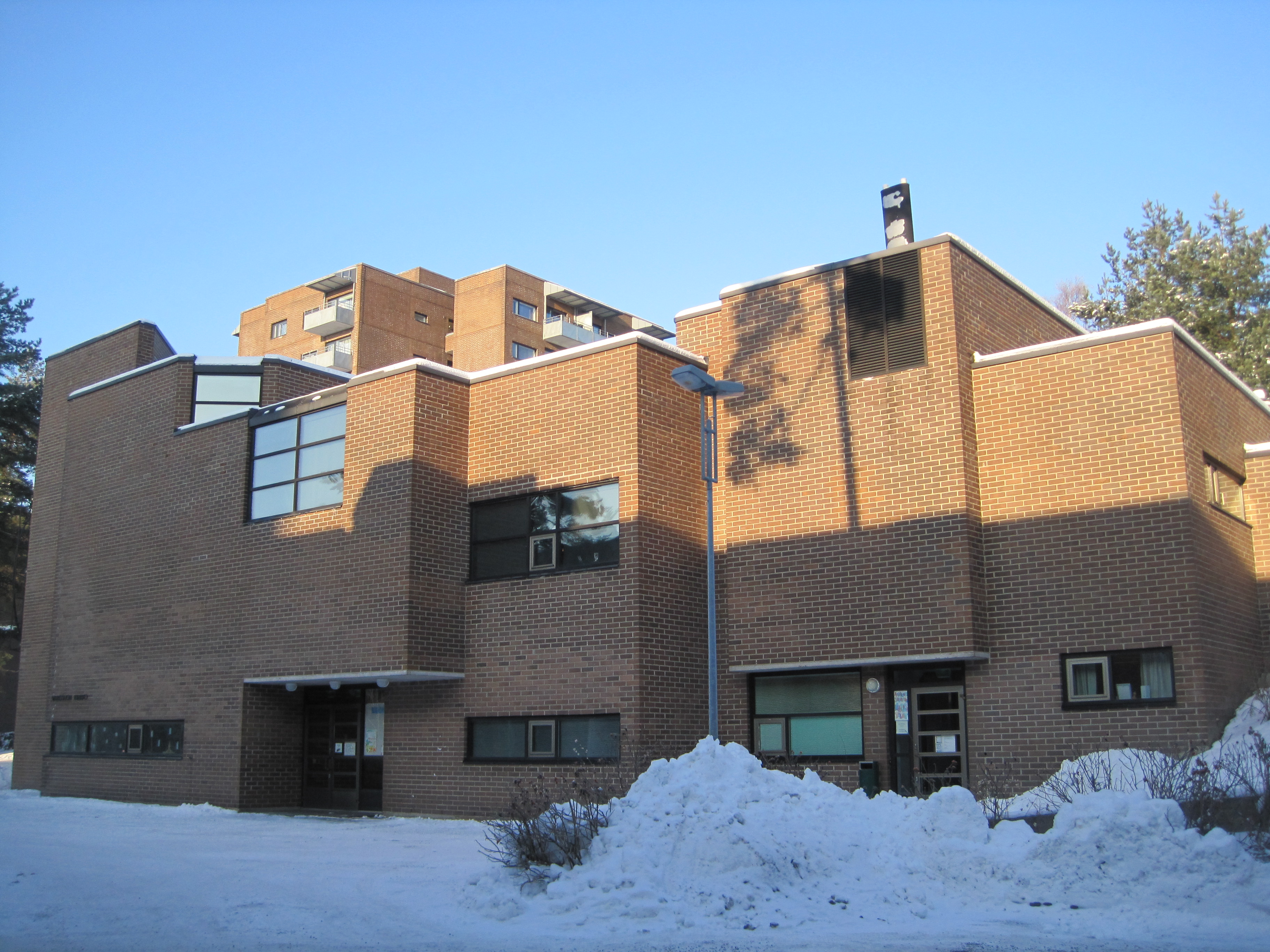
Church of Varissuo

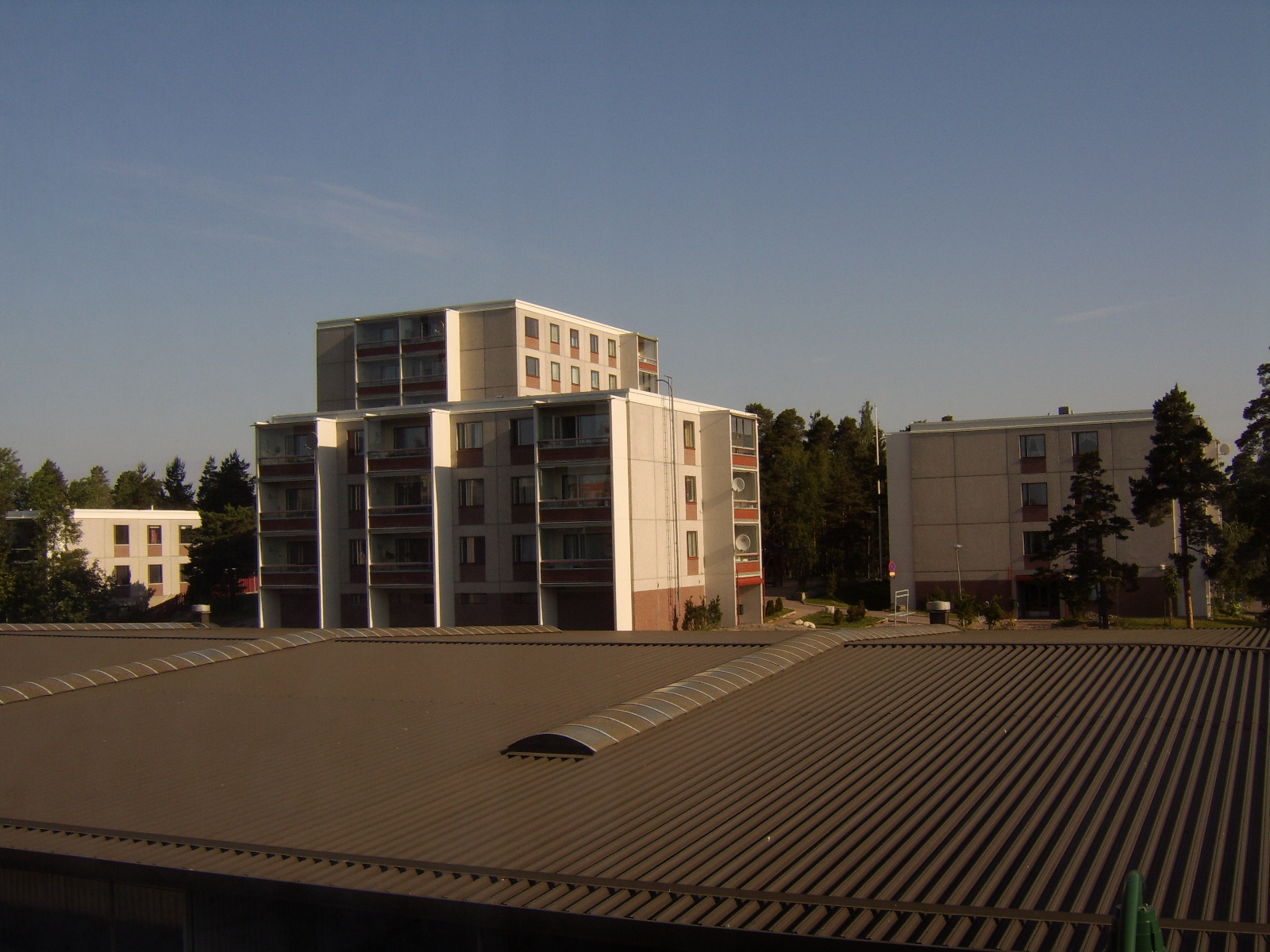
Apartment buildings in Varissuo

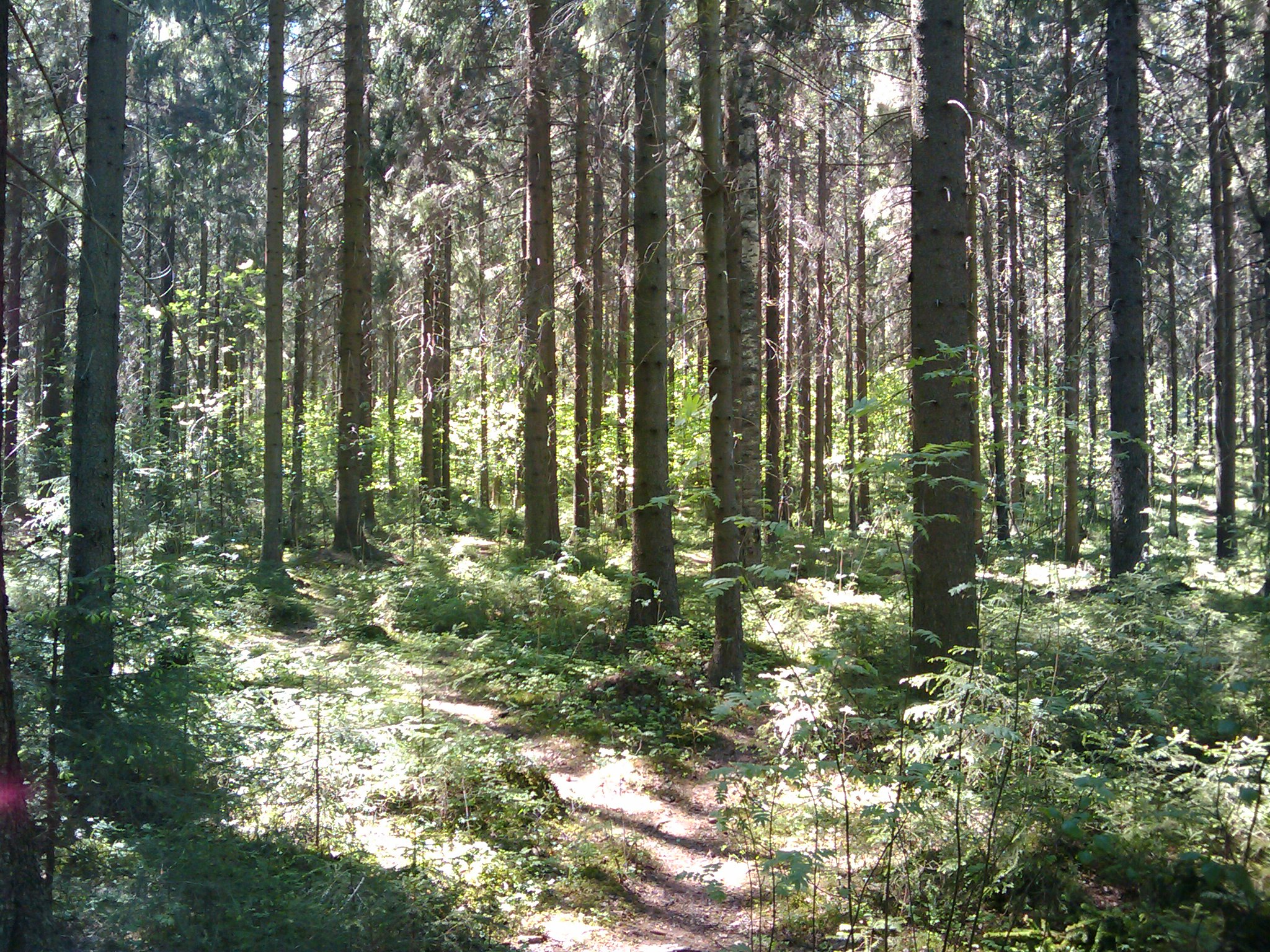
Forest of Varissuo

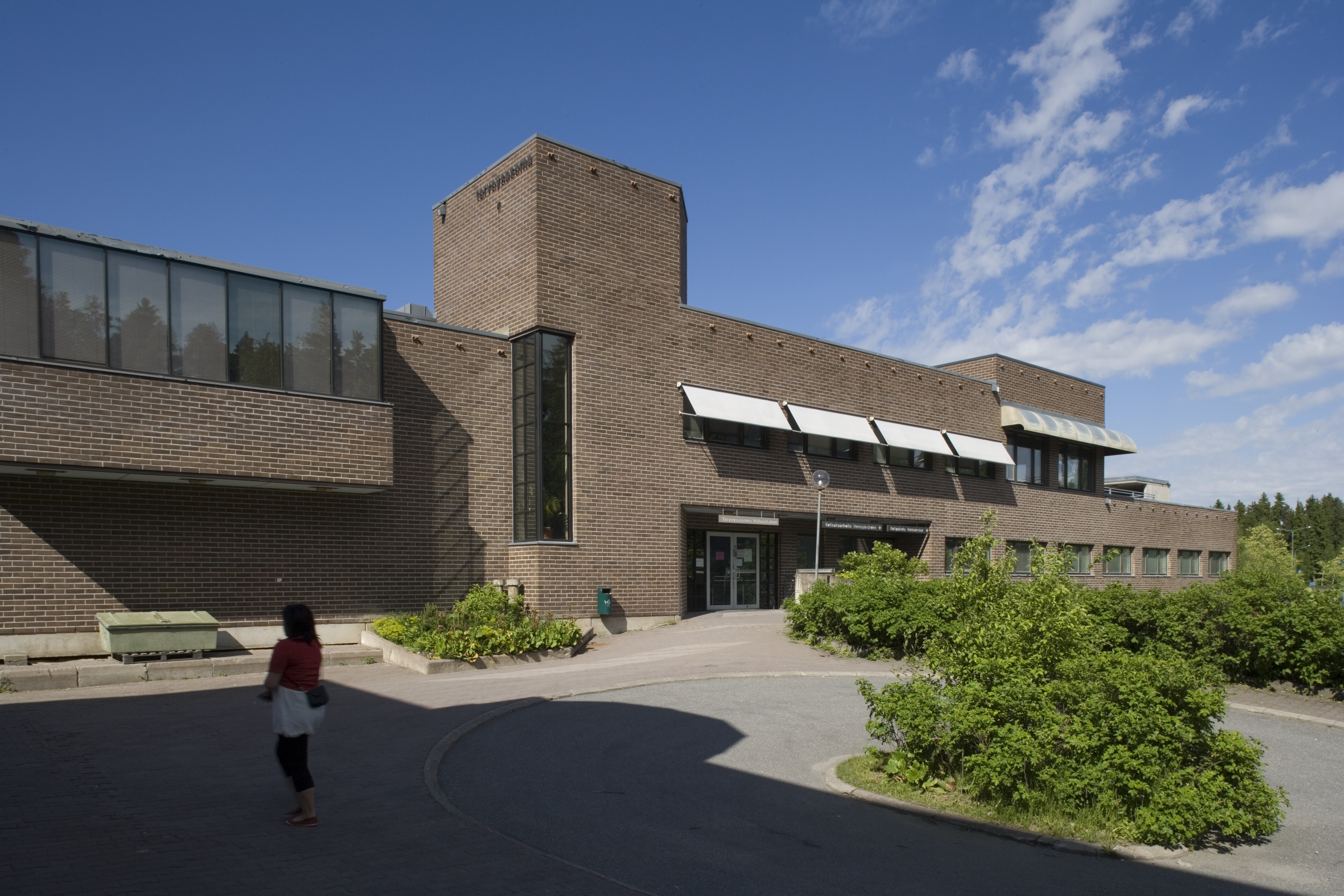
Varissuo health center

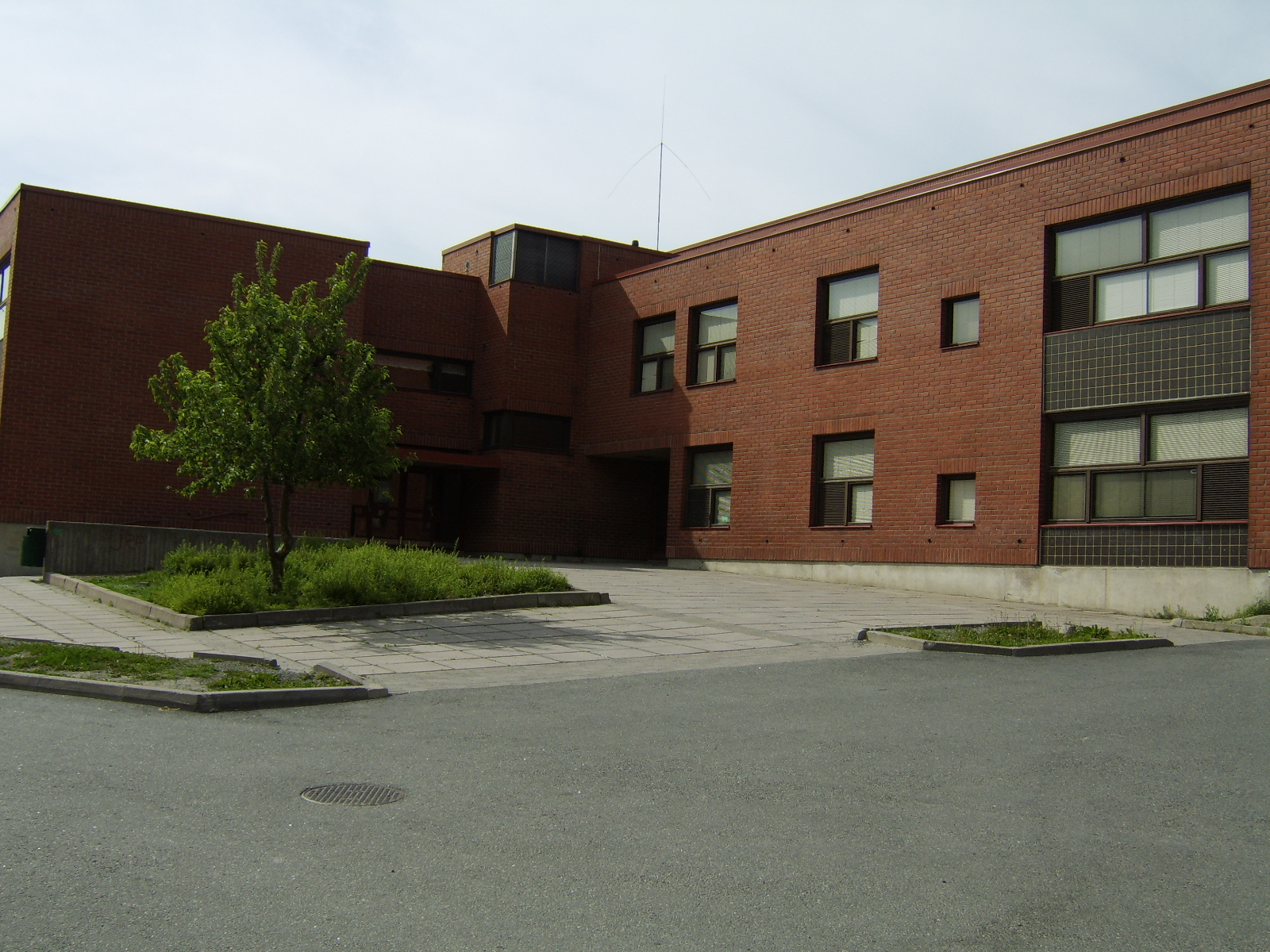
Turun normaalikoulu

== See also ==
- Districts of Turku
- Districts of Turku by population
