= Turun normaalikoulu =

School in Turku, Finland

Coordinates: 60°26′50″N 22°21′30″E

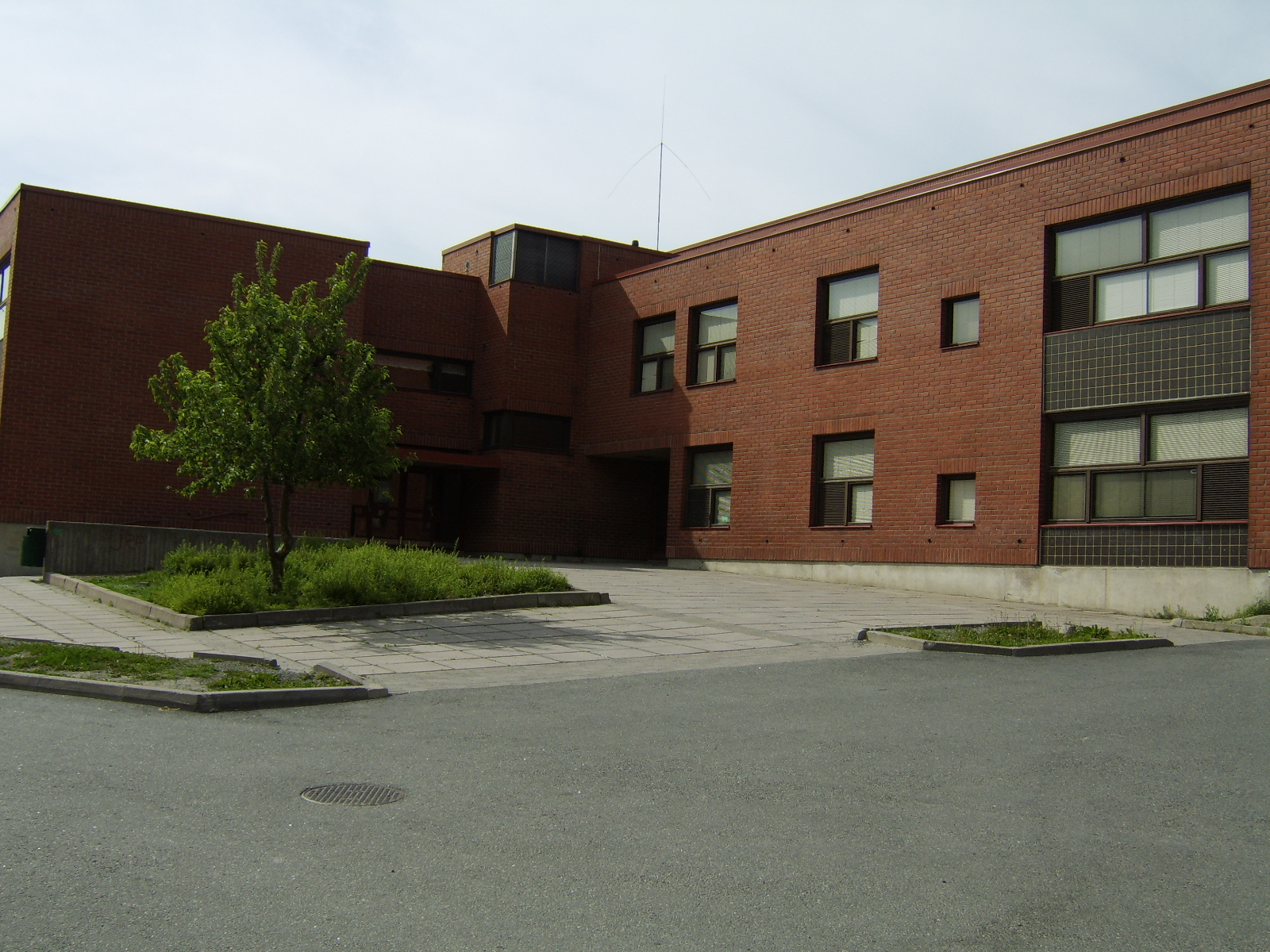
East wing of Turun normaalikoulu.

Turun normaalikoulu (or Norssi for short) is a school in Varissuo, an eastern suburb of Turku, Finland. It provides education from primary school (age 7) to upper secondary school (age 19). The school is authorized by the International Baccalaureate to teach in both the Middle Years Programme and the Diploma Programme. Founded in 1892, the school is one of the oldest and most prestigious in Turku.

The school holds a unique position as the only school in Turku not managed by the city's educational authorities, being federally funded and controlled by the University of Turku, who use it as one of their teacher training schools. It is the largest such establishment in Finland. There are usually approximately 1,300 people working at the school, of which 900 are students, 300 teacher trainees, and the rest teachers and other staff.

In autumn 2015, the school began renovation, lasting until winter 2017.

== History ==
The school was founded in 1892, under the name Käkisalmen reaali- ja porvariskoulu. It was located in the town of Käkisalmi on the Karelian Isthmus (now Priozersk, Russia). It was later renamed to Käkisalmen yhteiskoulu, and as the Winter War between Finland and Russia broke out in 1939, the school moved to Turku in South-Western Finland.

In 1957, the school was moved to the administrative hierarchy of the University of Turku and made into its teacher training school. It was transferred into a newly constructed building on Mestarinkatu, and retitled Turun normaalilyseo. However, only upper secondary school (ages 16–19) classes were taught until 1980, when the school was relocated to Varissuo and received its current name. The Varissuo building is designed by architect Björn Krogius and completed in 1980.
