= Strömberg (company) =

Finnish manufacturer of electromechanical products

ABB Oy
- Formerly: Finnish: Gottfrid Strömbergin sähköyhtiö; Swedish: Gottfrid Strömbergs elföretag; ABB Strömberg Oy
- Founded: 1889; 136 years ago in Helsinki, Finland
- Parent: ASEA (1987-1988); ABB (from 1988)

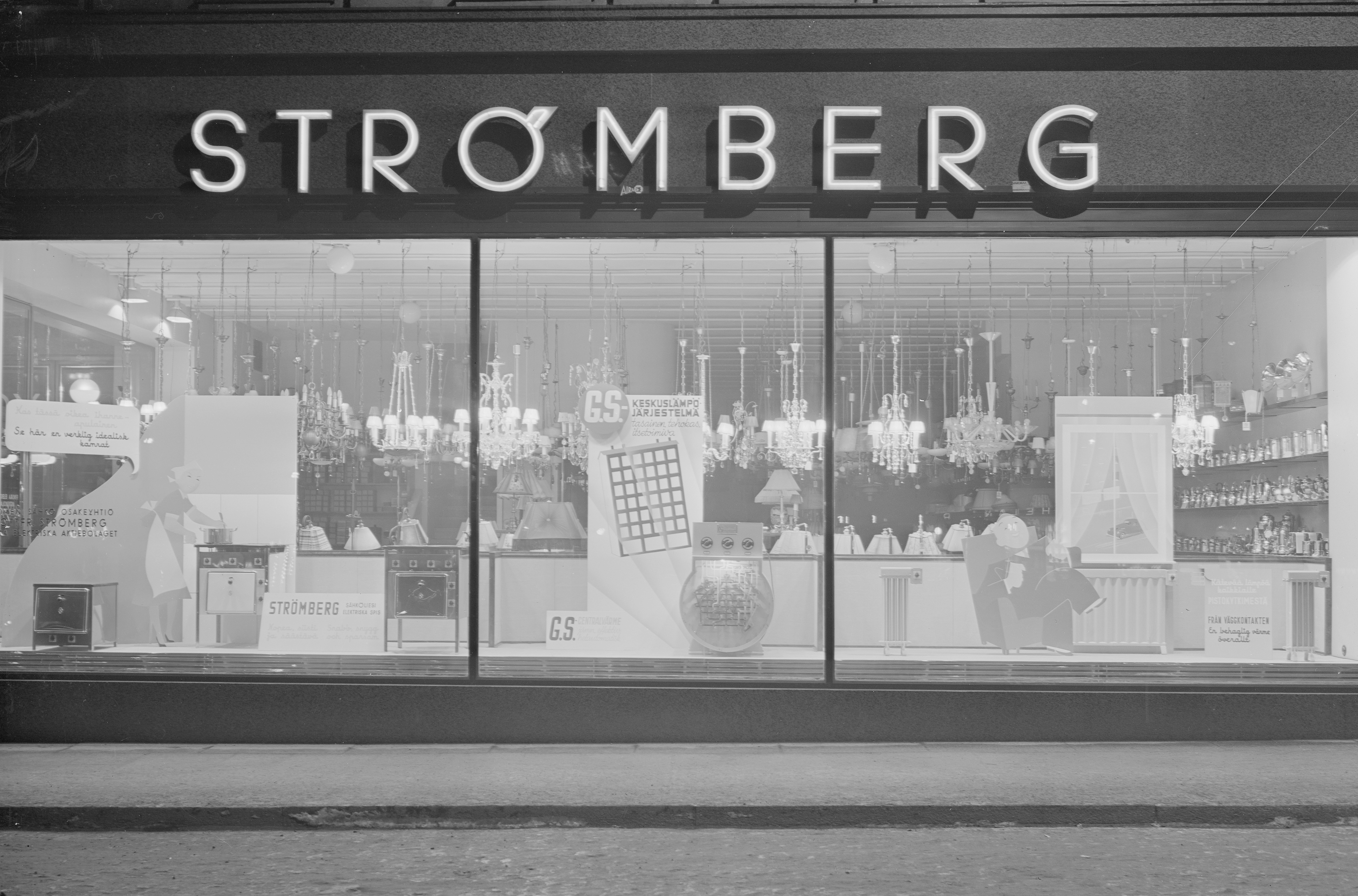
Strömberg Ab's storefront in Helsinki 1938

Stromberg Oy or Strömberg Ab, was a company founded by Gottfrid Strömberg in 1889 in Helsinki, Finland, and manufactured electromechanical products such as: generators, electric motors and small power plants. The company was founded initially as Gottfrid Strömbergin sähköyhtiö in Finnish, Gottfrid Strömbergs elföretag in Swedish. Strömberg was acquired by Swedish ASEA in 1987, then later in 1988 when ASEA merged with Brown, Boveri & Cie to form ABB, the company became a division of ABB and hence known as ABB Strömberg. In the later 1990s, the company name was changed from ABB Strömberg Oy into ABB Oy and a more integral part of ABB.

The company Strömberg expanded in an early stage and founded another factory branch in Vaasa, Finland, in an area which is now known as Strömberg Park. The Strömberg Park area was planned, and parts of the buildings there today were designed by Alvar Aalto.

The company has many inventions and firsts to its credit. It has many innovations particularly in the protection relay industry. It was one of the first to manufacture numerical relays in the 1980s and are still in production with high demand.

The company manufactured the electrical components of numerous rail vehicles built by other Finnish companies, as well as for the Finnish State Railways' Soviet-built Sr1 class locomotives.
