= List of town tramway systems in Finland =

This is a list of town tramway systems in Finland. It includes all tram systems in Finland, past and present; cities with currently operating systems, and those systems themselves, are indicated in bold and blue background colored rows. The use of the diamond (♦) symbol indicates where there were (or are) two or more independent tram systems operating concurrently within a single metropolitan area. Those tram systems that operated on other than standard gauge track (where known) are indicated in the 'Notes' column.

As of June 2022, the Tampere light rail is in service and two systems are under construction: Jokeri light rail and the Crown Bridges.

In addition, further research is being conducted on Turku light rail.

There are also early-stage plans of a new tramway in the city of Vantaa.

Location	Name of system	Traction type	Date (from)	Date (to)	Notes
**Helsinki**	**Trams in Helsinki**	Horse	21 Jun 1891	21 Oct 1901	Gauge: 1,000 mm (3 ft 3 3/8 in)
**Helsinki**	**Trams in Helsinki**	Electric	4 Sep 1900	-	Gauge: 1,000 mm (3 ft 3 3/8 in)
♦ Kulosaari	Kulosaari tramway	Electric	25 Sep 1910	14 Feb 1951	Unconnected to main system as built, connection to Helsinki (Sörnäinen) by tramcar ferry. Connection (bridge) opened 1919.
♦ Lauttasaari	Lauttasaari tramway	Horse	1913	31 Oct 1917	Unconnected to main system.
♦ Munkkiniemi & Haaga	Munkkiniemi and Haaga tramways	Electric	1914	1938	Rails owned by Aktiebolaget M.G. Stenius, operated by Helsinki tram. Merged 1938.
**Helsinki & Espoo**	**Jokeri light rail**	Electric	21 Oct 2023	-	Gauge: 1,000 mm (3 ft 3 3/8 in)
**Tampere**	**Tampere light rail**	Electric	9 Aug 2021	-	Gauge: 1,435 mm (4 ft 8 1/2 in)
Turku	Trams in Turku	Horse	4 May 1890	31 Oct 1892	Gauge: 1,435 mm (4 ft 8 1/2 in)
Turku	Trams in Turku	Electric	2 Dec 1908	1 Oct 1972	Gauge: 1,000 mm (3 ft 3 3/8 in); Reintroduction approved in 2026.
Vyborg*	Trams in Vyborg	Electric	28 Sep 1912	25 Apr 1957	Gauge: 1,000 mm (3 ft 3 3/8 in); *The city was ceded to the Soviet Union in 1940 and 1944.

Note: The city of Tampere formerly operated a trolleybus system (1948–1976). The city of Helsinki also had a one-line trolleybus system (1949–74 and 1979–85) in addition to trams.

== See also ==
- Trams in Finland
- List of town tramway systems in Europe
- List of tram and light rail transit systems
- List of metro systems
