= Trams in Finland =

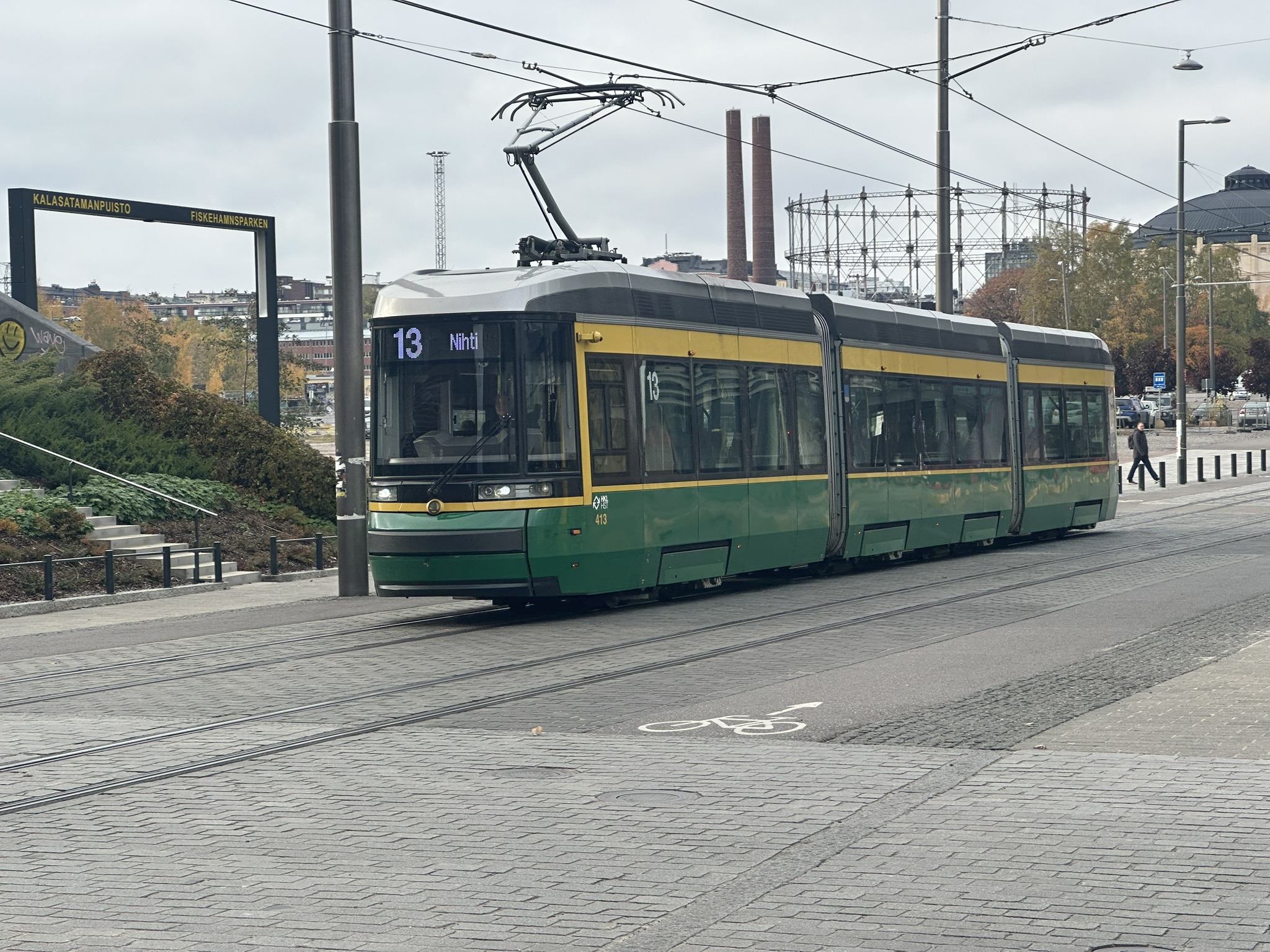
Škoda Artic tram in Helsinki, 2024.

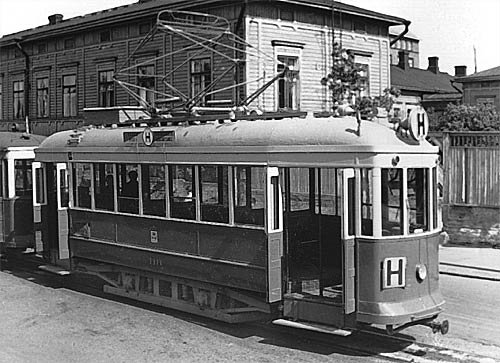
NWF/AEG tram no. 118 on line H in Helsinki, 1951.

Trams in Finland date from a horse-drawn Turku tramway network, which opened in 1890. Electric tramway traction started in Finland in 1900 with the introduction of electric trams in Helsinki, and the last horse-drawn trams were withdrawn from operation in 1917. Although there were three Finnish tramway networks between 1912 and World War II, by 1972 the number of networks had dwindled to just one, that of Helsinki, which remained Finland's only tramway network for almost 50 years. However, in August 2021, a light rail line was opened to the public in Tampere. There have also been proposals to set up tram or light rail networks in some other cities. As of 2021, the most concrete such plans are in Turku.

== History ==
City/Region	Article	Propulsion	Period	Rail gauge (mm)	Notes
Helsinki	Trams in Helsinki	Horse	1891–1901, 1913–1917 (Lauttasaari trams)	1,000	
Helsinki	Trams in Helsinki	Electricity	1900–	1,000	
Tampere	Trams in Tampere	Electricity	2021–	1,435	
Turku	Trams in Turku (1908–1972)	Horses	1890–1892	1,435	
Turku	Trams in Turku (1908–1972)	Electricity	1908–1972	1,000	
Vyborg	Trams in Vyborg	Electricity	1912–1939, 1943–1957	1,000	Tram system stopped after Russia invaded Vyborg

=== Helsinki ===
In Helsinki, horse trams operated between 1890 and 1901. Since 1900, electric trams have operated there.

For part of its existence, the Helsinki tramway network has been supplemented by a trolleybus line: in 1949–1974, and on a trial basis in 1979–1985.

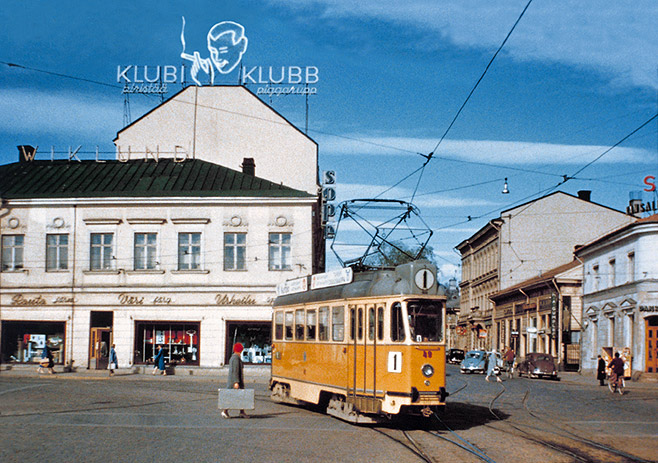
Valmet RM 2 no. 49 on line 1 to the harbour at Market Square in Turku, 1959.

Between 1913 and 1917 there was a short-lived horse-drawn tramway in Lauttasaari, an island that was a part of the Helsinki Rural Municipality and since 1920 the municipality of Huopalahti, which was later merged into Helsinki.

The Kulosaari, and Haaga municipalities also had a tramway that belonged to the Helsinki tram network.

=== Turku ===
In Turku, there were horse-drawn trams from 1890 to 1892, and electric trams from 1908 to 1972. The tram network was abandoned in 1972, when the last remaining tram line was replaced by buses.

The arguments against the Turku tramway were associated with the 1960s view that trams were an outdated mode of transport, while buses were seen as modern technology. The decision to close the Turku tramway network can also be seen in part as inspired by events in Stockholm, which had closed most of its tramway network a little earlier.

The municipalities of Kaarina and Maaria in the Turku region had a tramway that belonged to the Turku tram network.

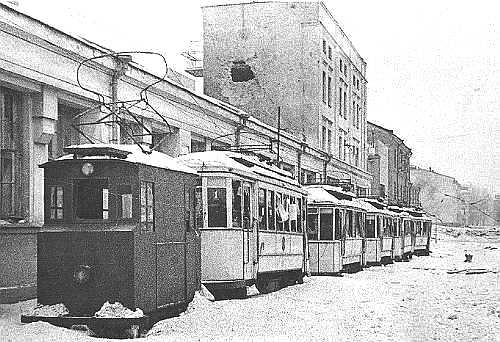
Locally built tramway locomotive (with AEG traction motors) in Vyborg, 1940.

=== Viipuri ===
Trams began running in Viipuri, then a part of the Grand Duchy of Finland, in 1912. They were electrically operated from the start.

Following the cession of the city to the Soviet Union during World War II, the tramway network remained in service until 1957.

=== Other tramways ===
Some narrow gauge Finnish railways with mostly or only freight traffic have been called "tramways".

These railways include industrial lines, such as the "freight tram" in Tampere (from Finlayson to Santalahti woodyard a few kilometres away), which closed in 1957, the railway in Mustio (a freight line from the railway station to the mill), which closed in 1964 and the Kyröskoski industrial railway in Hämeenkyrö (Finland's last narrow gauge industrial railway), which closed in 1989. The harbour railway in Lohja, which was Finland's first electric railway, running from the state railway station to the port, carried both passenger and freight services but closed in 1930.

== 21st century ==
=== Helsinki ===
A tram in Helsinki city centre in January 2021

In Helsinki, there are 12 tram lines with a total network length of 86.5 km (53.7 mi). 25 km (15.5 mi) of the total length is a part of the light rail line 15, opened in 2023. The most recent line opening took place in August 2024, when line 13 was opened, initially running from Nihti to Länsi-Pasila.

=== Tampere ===
Škoda Artic tram in Tampere, Finland, January 2023

Since August 2021, there has been a tram system in Tampere, consisting of two intersecting lines. The tramway has a total network length of 24 km (14.9 mi).

== Projects ==
=== Helsinki ===
In the Helsinki region, there are plans to mainly expand the light rail network. Currently, 2 major projects, Crown Bridges and the Vantaa light rail, are under construction. The Crown Bridges project is currently expected to be finished in 2027, while the Vantaa light rail is projected to be finished in 2029.

Currently Helsinki has only one light rail line, known as Raide-Jokeri. It runs from Itäkeskus metro station to Keilaniemi, offering interchanges to the commuter rail in three places (Oulunkylä, Huopalahti and Leppävaara). The line also offers the possibility to change to the metro in three places (Itäkeskus, Aalto University and Keilaniemi).

The Crown Bridges project consists of two lines, connecting the island of Laajasalo directly to the city center. The project includes three new bridges being built, which connect the city center to the newly built area of Nihti, the island of Korkeasaari, and finally Laajasalo. The bridge connecting Korkeasaari to Laajasalo is the biggest of the three bridges. The two lines will run to Kruunuvuorenranta and Yliskylä.

The Vantaa light rail will connect Mellunmäki in Helsinki to the airport in Vantaa. The line will replace the currently running trunk route 570.

=== Tampere ===
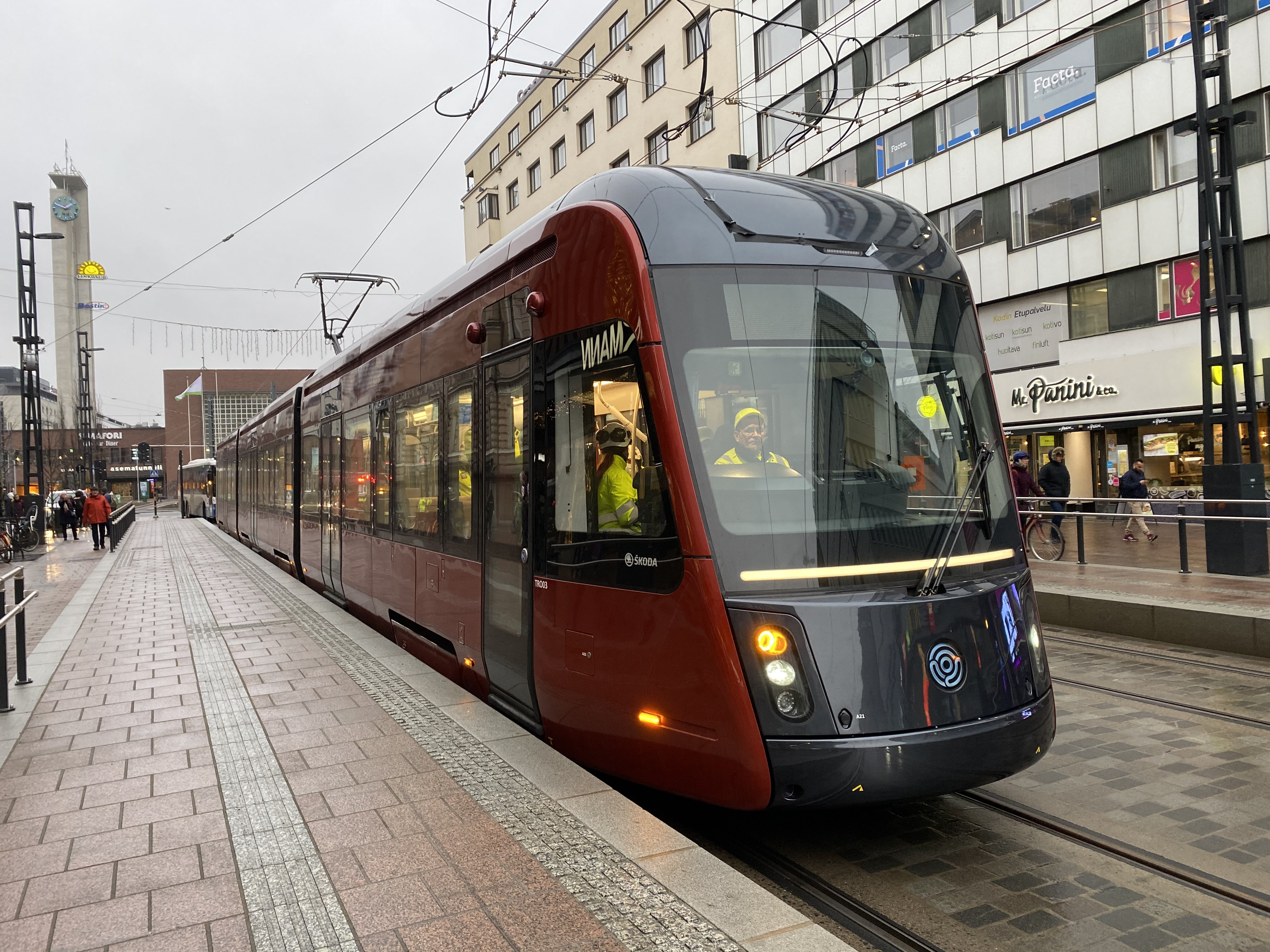
The Artic X34 tram vehicle along the Hämeenkatu street in Tampere

The construction of the Tampere light rail system started in 2017, with the first two lines being completed in August 2021. Further extensions to the system are underway, with the section from Pyynikintori to Santalahti being scheduled for opening in 2023.

=== Turku ===
In Turku, the newest light rail plan was approved as part of the Turku area public inquiry for the period to 2020. In December 2009, the Turku City Council decided that "light rail will be built for the routes that are heavily congested, when the financial plan and related conditions, and government financing and the proportions that the other municipalities within the region will pay for construction, have been agreed." As of 2020, the Turku municipal council was researching the best path for the first new tram line in the city.

There have also been proposals to build a heritage tramway in Turku that would run during the summer season along the Aura River between the Turku Castle and Martinsilta (St Martin's Bridge), and later also to the Market Square, in perhaps the most attractive part of Turku. The old tram depot (with a few old, restored cars in operating condition) is on Linnankatu, a stone's throw from the castle and the river. The route would be relatively short, and the tramway would therefore be relatively inexpensive to build. The Museum Tram initiative is pending in the Turku city administration, but has not been progressed since 2005.

== See also ==
- History of rail transport in Finland
- List of town tramway systems in Finland
- Rail transport in Finland
- Trams in Europe
