= Hakunila =

Hakunila Håkansböle
- City District
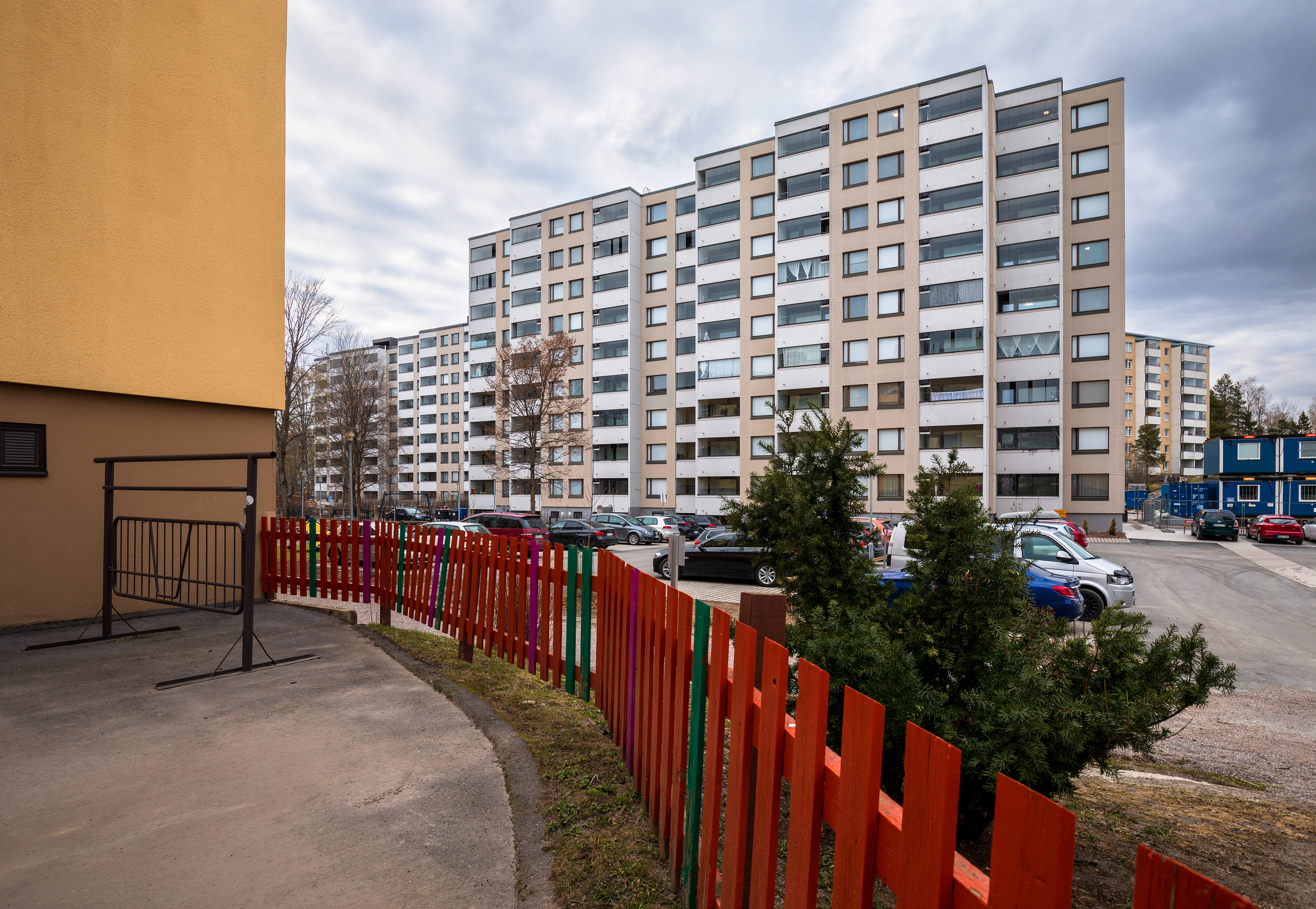
- High rise flats, typical of Hakunila

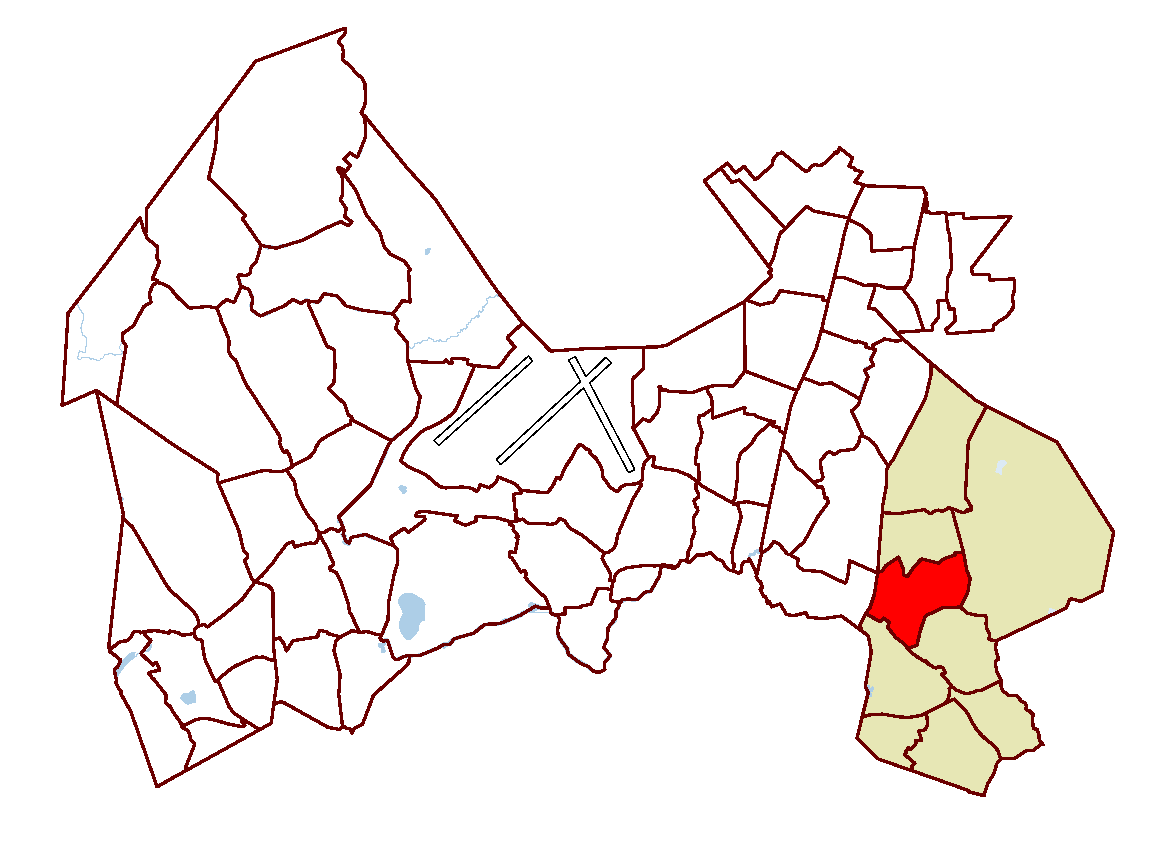
- Location on the map of Vantaa, with the district in red and the major region in light brown
- Coordinates: 60°16′43″N 25°06′19″E
- Country: Finland
- City: Vantaa
- Major region: Hakunila

Area
  - Total: 3.0 km^{2} (1.2 sq mi)
  - Major region: 36.2 km^{2} (14.0 sq mi)

Population (1.1.2014)
  - Total: 11,238
  - Density: 3,700/km^{2} (9,700/sq mi)
  - Major region: 29,214
  - Major region density: 807/km^{2} (2,090/sq mi)
- Time zone: GMT +2
- Postal Code(s): 01200, 01201
- Website: www.vantaa.fi/frontpage/

Hakunila (Finnish: [ˈhɑkunilɑ]; Swedish: Håkansböle, Finland Swedish: [ˈhoːkɑːnsˌbøːle]), is a district and major region of the municipality of Vantaa, Finland, located within the eastern part of the city. The district has a population of 11,238 and a population density of 3,746 inhabitants per square kilometre (9,700/sq mi).

The district is bordered to the west by Lahdenväylä (a constituent of the National road 4 (E75)), to the south by the Ring III (Finnish: Kehä III) beltway, to the east by the districts of Ojanko and Sotunki, and to the north by the district of Itä-Hakkila. Most of central Hakunila was built during the 1970s, and consists of high-rise residential tower blocks.

The Hakunila major region consists of nine districts: the central Hakunila, Itä-Hakkila, Kuninkaanmäki, Länsimäki, Länsisalmi, Ojanko, Rajakylä, Sotunki, and Vaarala. As of January 2014, the Hakunila major region has a total population of 29,214 and a population density of 810 inhabitants per square kilometre (2,100/sq mi).

== History ==
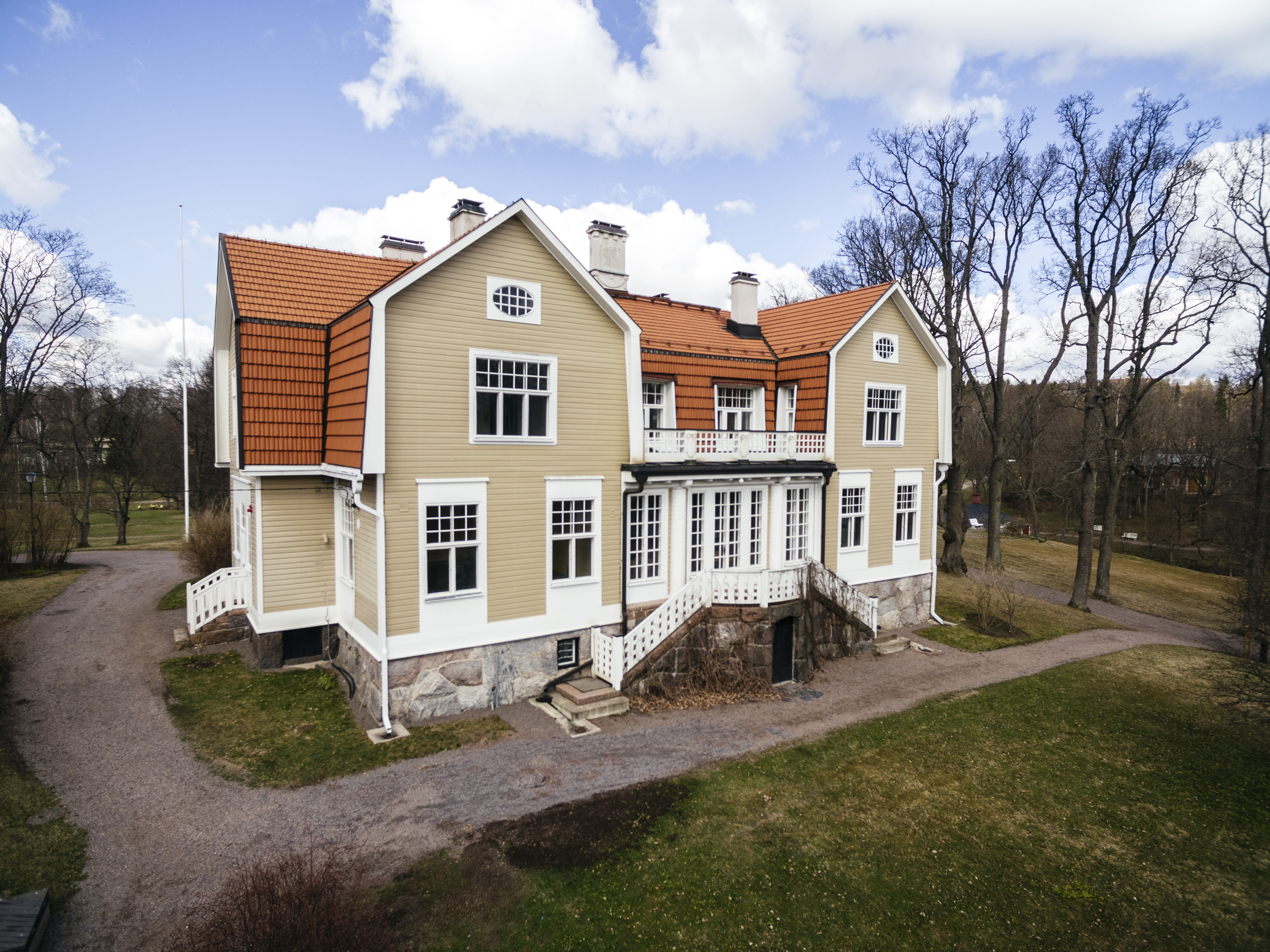
Hakunila Manor

Hakunila is a Finnish translation of the Swedish name Håkansböle, the original village that stood in the same location. During the 17th century, two distinct villages were formed in the area around Hakunila; Håkansböle and Nissbacka. The name of the village, Håkansböle, derives from the name of the original founder of the village, Håkan Jönsson, who lived in the area in the 16th century.

== Amenities ==
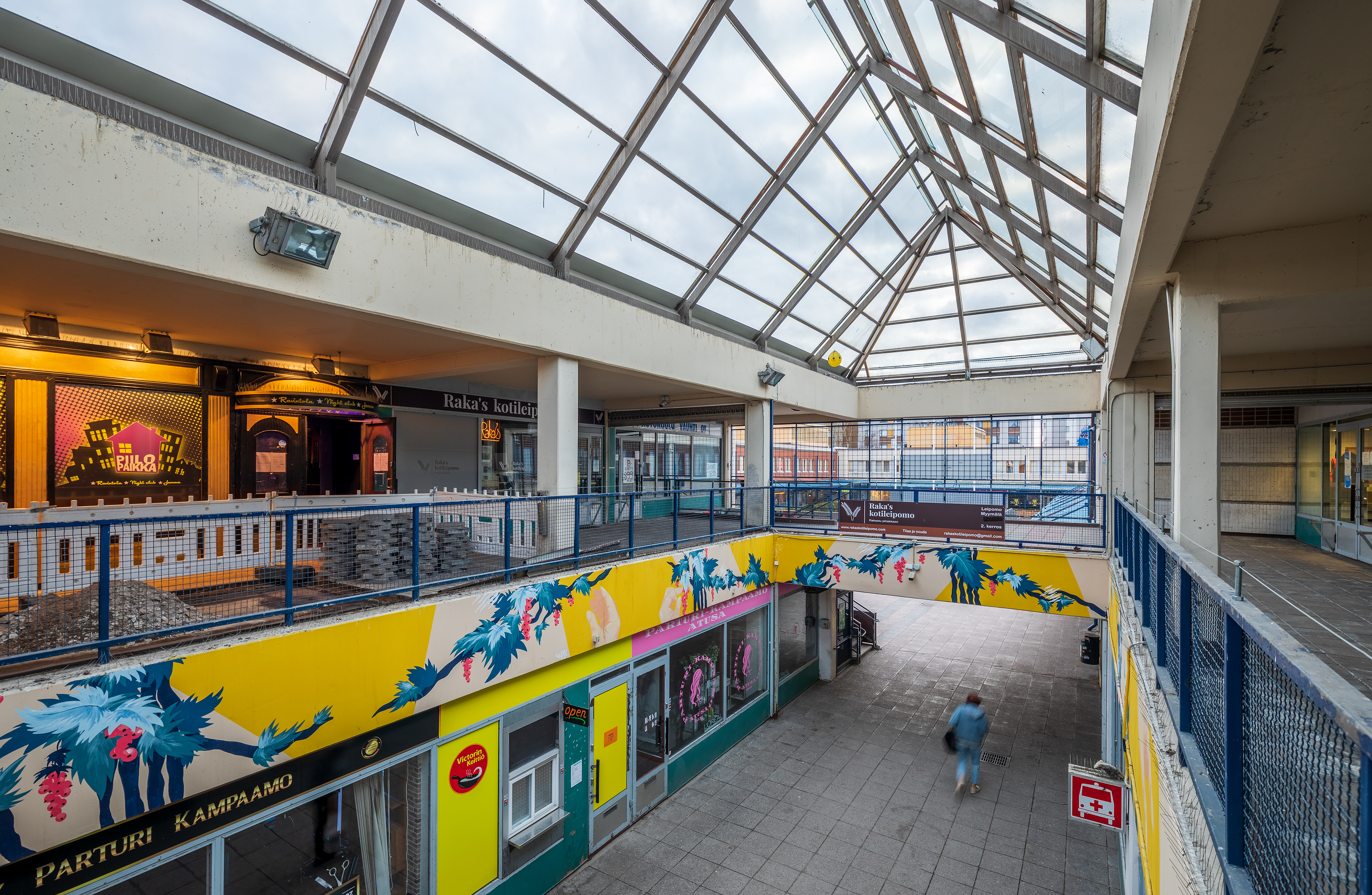
Hakunila shopping centre

At the center of the town, there is a small shopping centre containing a supermarket and a pharmacy, among other amenities such as restaurants and bars. Next to the center is a library and a school, which form a single building. In the surrounding area there is also another school, stables, and a swimming hall. The swimming hall regularly closes in the summer and duties are transferred to the larger swimming hall in nearby Tikkurila. Most of the buildings in the area are tower blocks and flats, with some terraced and semi detached houses being found in the outskirts of the town. There are also numerous cross-country skiing trails in use during the winter.

== Transport ==
Hakunila is connected to the rest of Vantaa and the metropolitan area of Helsinki by the HSL bus network, with the nearest commuter rail stop being in Tikkurila, and the nearest metro station being in Mellunmäki. Vantaa light rail, with a projected finishing date of 2028, is being planned in the area.
