= Länsimäki =

Länsimäki Västerkulla
- City District
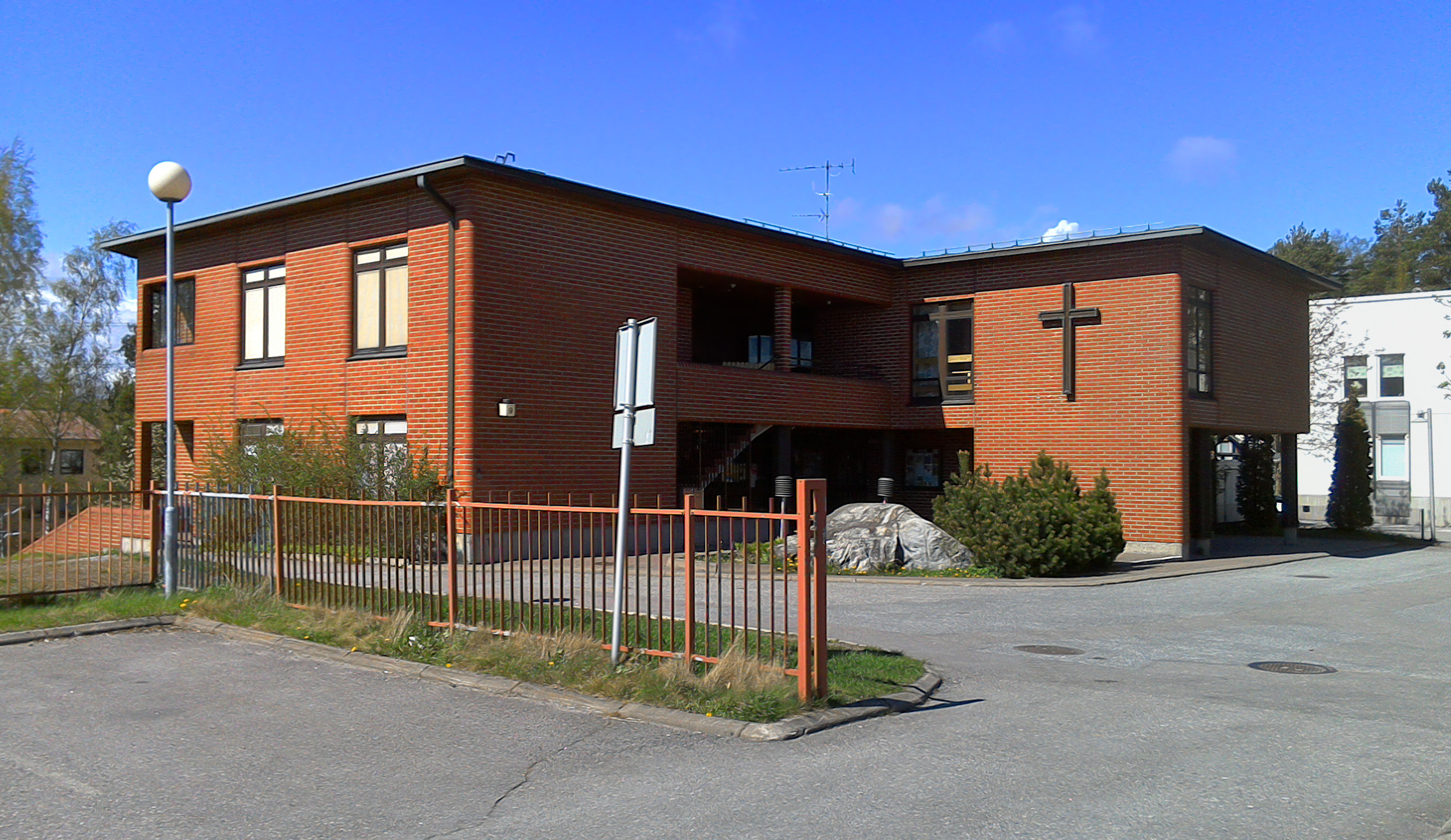
- The brick church of Länsimäki

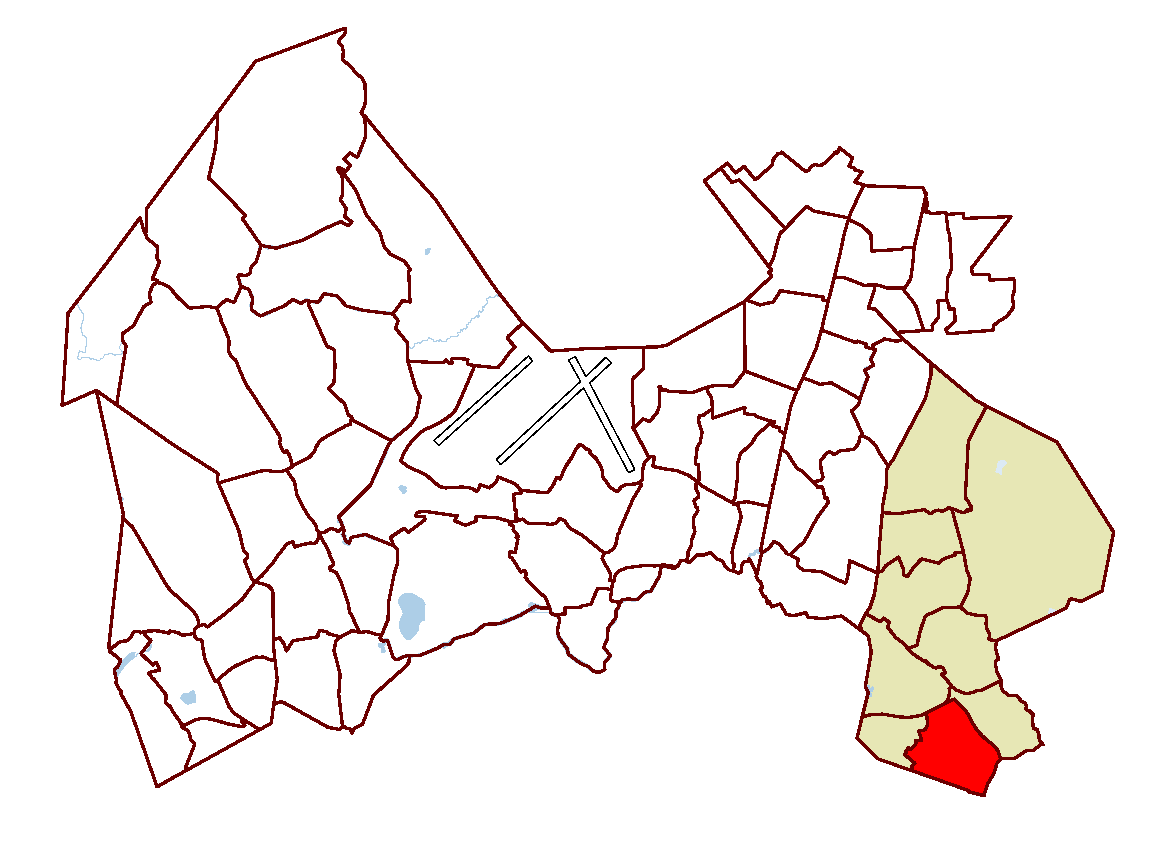
- Location on the map of Vantaa, with the district in red and the Hakunila major region in light brown
- Coordinates: 60°14′34″N 25°06′46″E
- Country: Finland
- City: Vantaa
- Major region: Hakunila

Area
  - Total: 3.1 km^{2} (1.2 sq mi)

Population (1.1.2014)
  - Total: 5,675
  - Density: 1,800/km^{2} (4,700/sq mi)
- Time zone: GMT +2
- Postal Code(s): 01280
- Website: www.vantaa.fi/frontpage/

Länsimäki (Swedish: Västerkulla) is a city district in Vantaa, Finland. It is located in southeastern Vantaa, in the Hakunila major region. It is bordered to the north by national road 7, the west by the district of Rajakylä, the east by the district of Länsisalmi, and the south by the Helsinki district of Mellunmäki.

The population of Länsimäki is 5,675 (1.1.2014). Länsimäki is known for its historical farmland and World War I-era fortifications.

== History ==
The buildings of Länsimäki were constructed on land bought from the Westerkulla estate, which has existed on the grounds since the 1630s. The estate was formed through the combination of four farms, and though its original manor was destroyed in a conflagration in 1826, its land and reconstructed manor exist to this day.

Another site of historical importance in Länsimäki is Myllymäki Park and its World War I-era fortifications. Although not unique in Vantaa, the fortifications are considered some of the best preserved in all of Greater Helsinki.

== Amenities ==
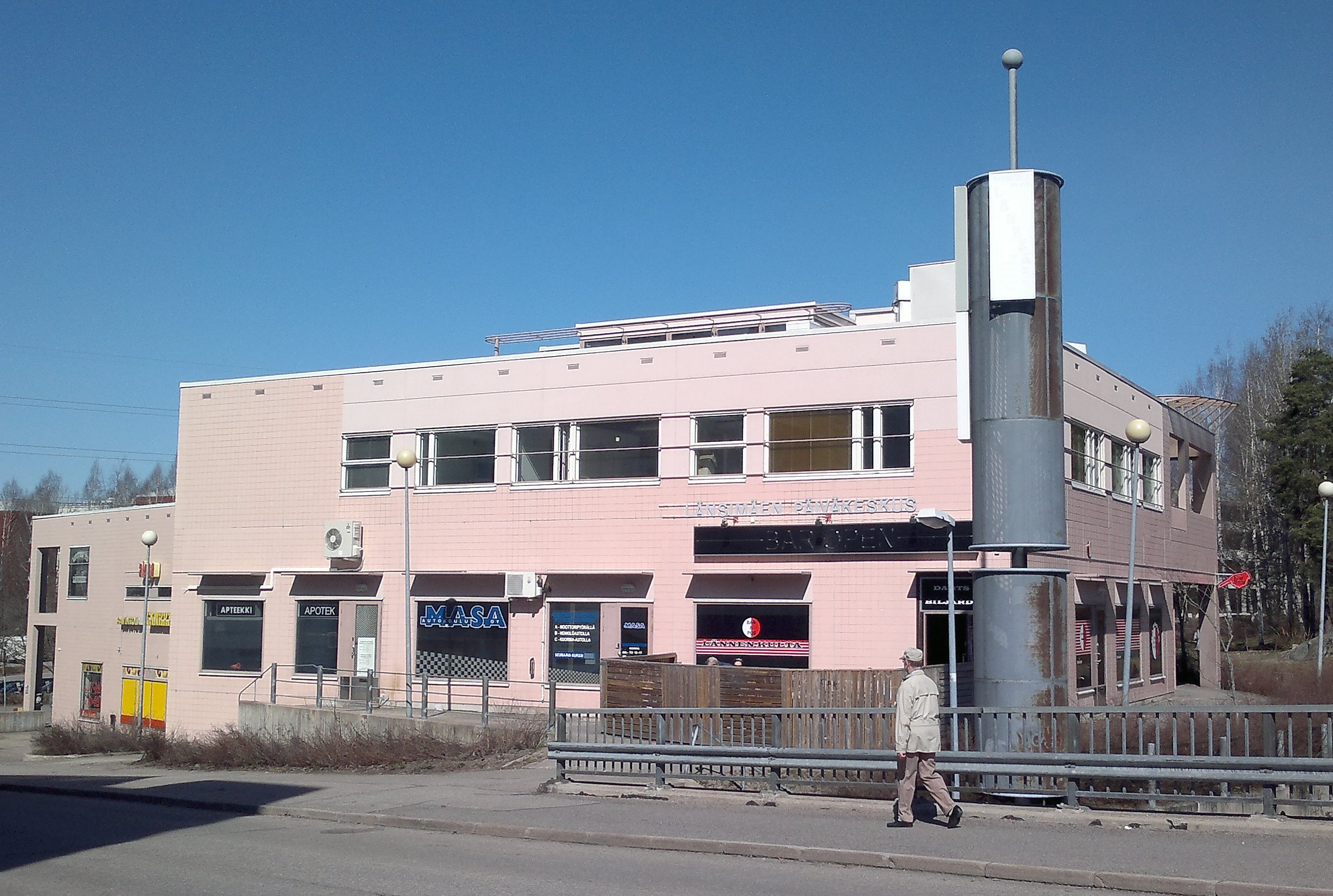
Länsimäki shopping center

Länsimäki has both a primary and lower secondary school and several day care and kindergarten services. The district has two small shopping centers, which include shops and restaurants, a HelMet library, and a community health center.

== Population ==
The population of Länsimäki is 5,675 (1.1.2014), and its total area is about 3.1 square kilometres (1.2 sq mi), giving the district a population density of 1,800 inhabitants per square kilometre (4,700/sq mi). Though this value is roughly twice that of Vantaa as a whole, the population of Länsimäki is far more concentrated. This is due to the district being rigidly divided into densely constructed high-rise neighborhoods and largely unpopulated forest and farmland.

== Transport ==
Most public transport around Länsimäki (particularly leading into Helsinki) is done via the Helsinki Metro, due to the close proximity of the Mellunmäki metro station. There have been talks of extending the Helsinki Metro to Länsimäki. Transportation to and from the rest of Vantaa is done through HSL/HRT bus connections.
