= Helsinki light rail line 15 =

Light rail line in Helsinki and Espoo, Finland

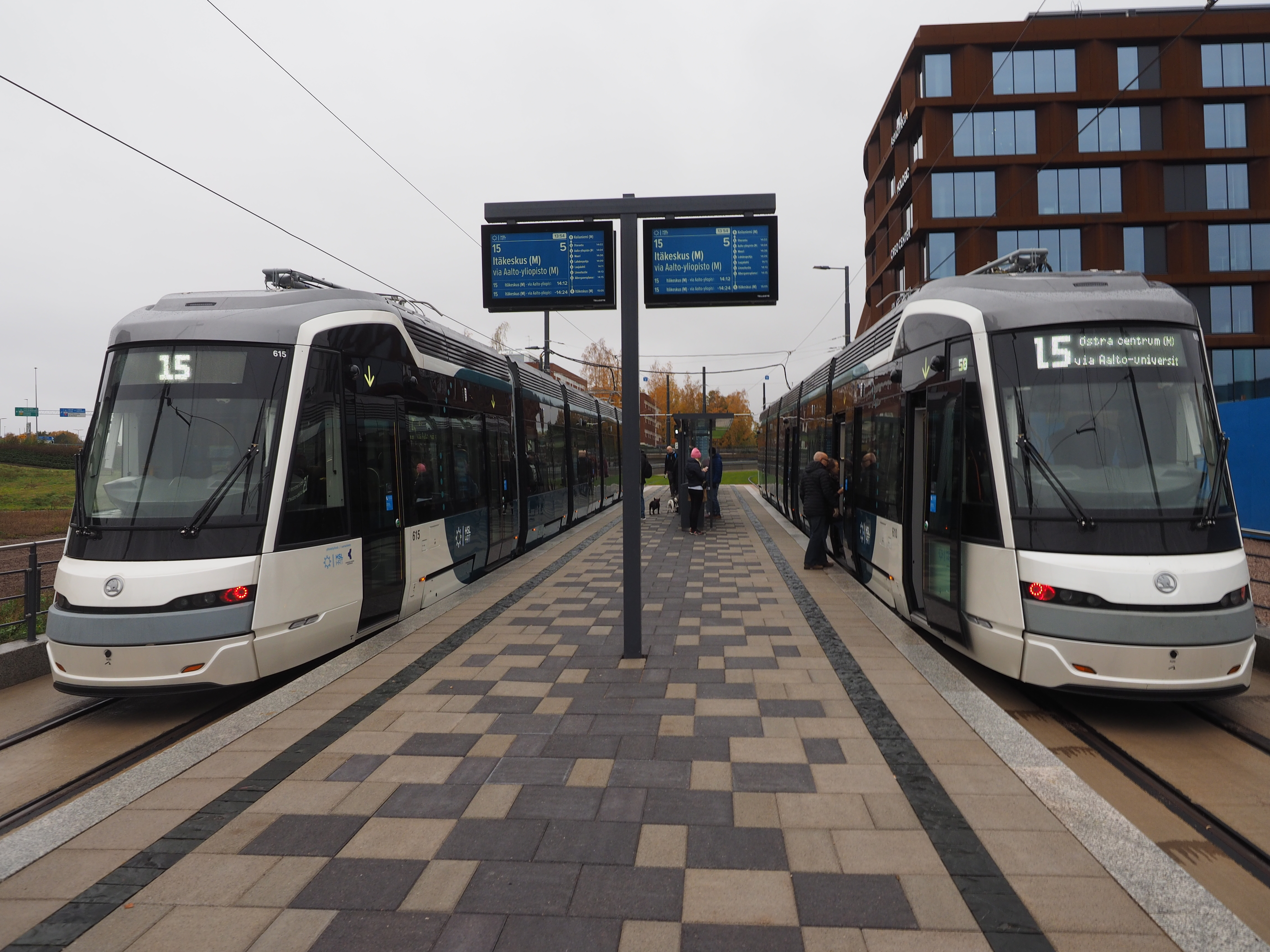
- Western terminus of the line in Keilaniemi, Espoo

Overview
- Other name: Jokeri light rail
- Native name: Pikaraitiotie 15
- Status: Operational
- Line number: 15
- Locale: Helsinki, Espoo
- Termini: Keilaniemi; Itäkeskus
- Stations: 34

Service
- Type: Light rail
- System: Helsinki tram network
- Services: 15
- Operator: Metropolitan Area Transport
- Depot: Roihupelto
- Rolling stock: 29x Škoda Artic X54

History
- Commenced: 2019
- Opened: 21 October 2023

Technical
- Line length: 25 km (16 mi)
- Number of tracks: 2
- Character: Partial street running, partial at-grade separate right-of-way
- Track gauge: 1,000 mm (3 ft 3 3/8 in) metre gauge
- Electrification: Overhead catenary at 750V DC
- Operating speed: up to 70 km/h (43 mph)
- Signalling: Line of sight
Route map
- Sources

Helsinki light rail line 15 (Finnish: Pikaraitiotie 15, Swedish: Snabbspårväg 15) is a 25-kilometre (16 mi) light rail line connecting Keilaniemi in Espoo and Itäkeskus in Helsinki, Finland. Known during construction as Jokeri light rail (Finnish: Raide-Jokeri, Swedish: Spårjokern), construction was started in June 2019 and the line began operating in October 2023, about 10 months ahead of the original schedule. The line replaced the trunk bus line 550, a bus rapid transit service and the busiest bus service on the Helsinki Regional Transport Authority public transport network, at the end of 2023.

== History ==
=== Background ===
The "trunk bus line" 550, a bus rapid transit service, formerly branded Jokeri ("The Joker", after Joukkoliikenteen kehämäinen raideinvestointi – "A circular rail investment for public transportation"), has been converted to light rail. The city councils of Helsinki and Espoo approved the construction project in June 2016, after the Finnish government decided to participate in funding the construction. The rail line was preliminarily projected to open in 2021. The construction of the 25-kilometre (16 mi) light rail line, without rolling stock or a depot, was projected to cost 274 million euros as of June 2016, with rolling stock and a depot projected to additionally cost up to 95 and 65 million euros, respectively.

The 550 was originally conceived as a light rail line in 1990, but only realised as a bus line in 2003. The general plans to convert the congested bus line to light rail were first published in 2009, but the decision to begin construction was only taken in June 2016 after many delays. The municipality of Espoo has located the western terminus of the rail line at Keilaniemi instead of Tapiola. There are connections to the Helsinki Metro at Aalto University and Keilaniemi.

The previous 550 bus line was a 25-kilometre-long (16 mi) orbital route running roughly parallel to the innermost ring road around Helsinki (Ring I). The 550 ran from Itäkeskus in the east to Tapiola in the west, connecting with the commuter rail network at Oulunkylä, Huopalahti, Pitäjänmäki and Leppävaara, and with the metro in Itäkeskus and Tapiola.

Light rail line 15 is a significant development for the Helsinki tram network. The route is located entirely outside the current network, surrounding it; the length of the route constitutes a large proportion of the total network length, and the line is built to modern light rail standards (as opposed to the relatively old-fashioned street tram system). However, the new line is technically compatible with the existing network (1,000 mm (3 ft 3 3/8 in) metre gauge, low platforms). Direct integration with the Helsinki Metro (broad gauge, high platforms, planned driverless operation) was briefly studied in 2003, but it was found to be highly impractical.

=== Construction ===
Construction on the line officially began in June 2019. Construction proceeded ahead of schedule, with test runs being completed between 2022 and June 2023. Regular service started in October 2023, ahead of the original 2024 target date. 5858 workers took part in the construction.

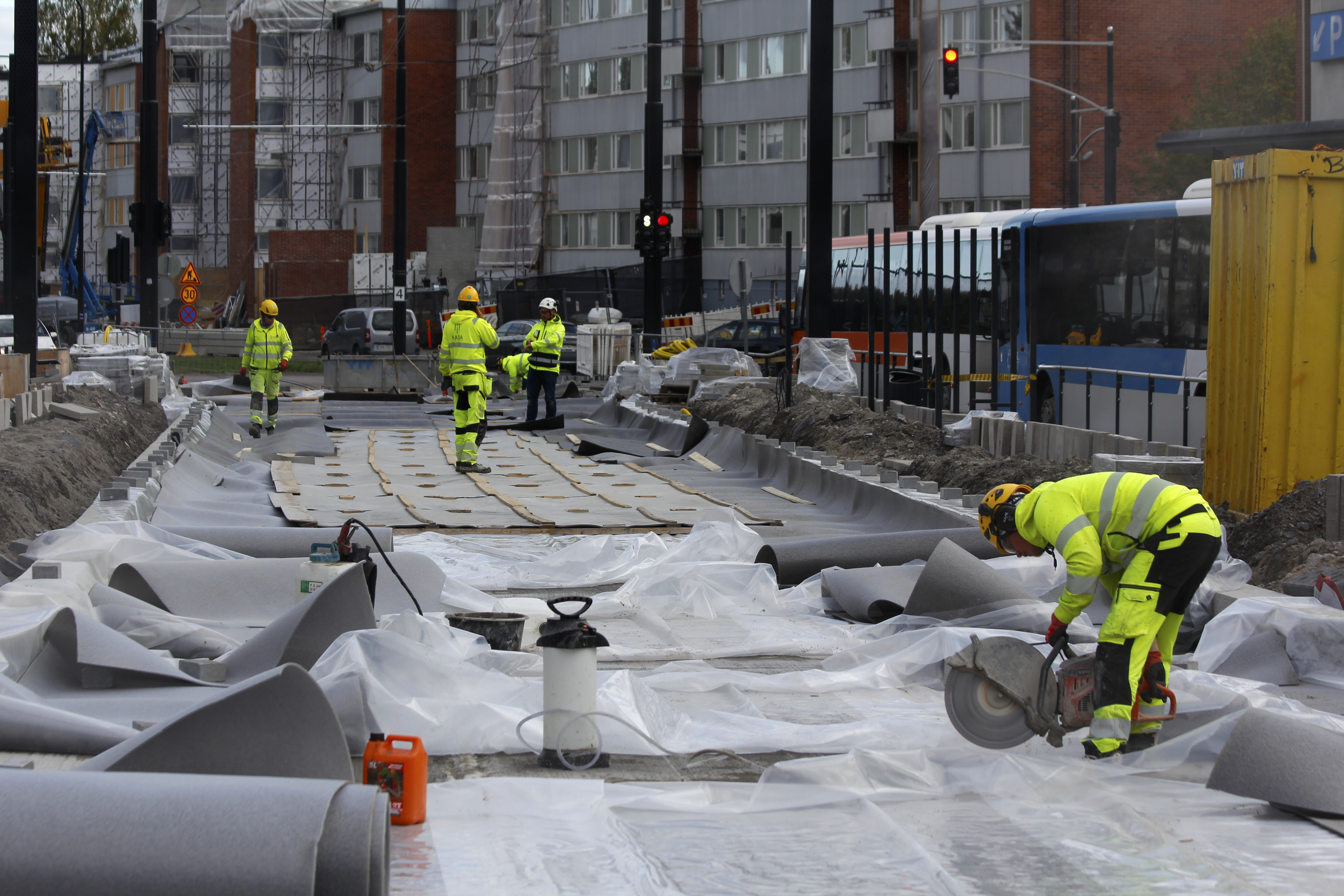
Construction work in Maunula in September 2022

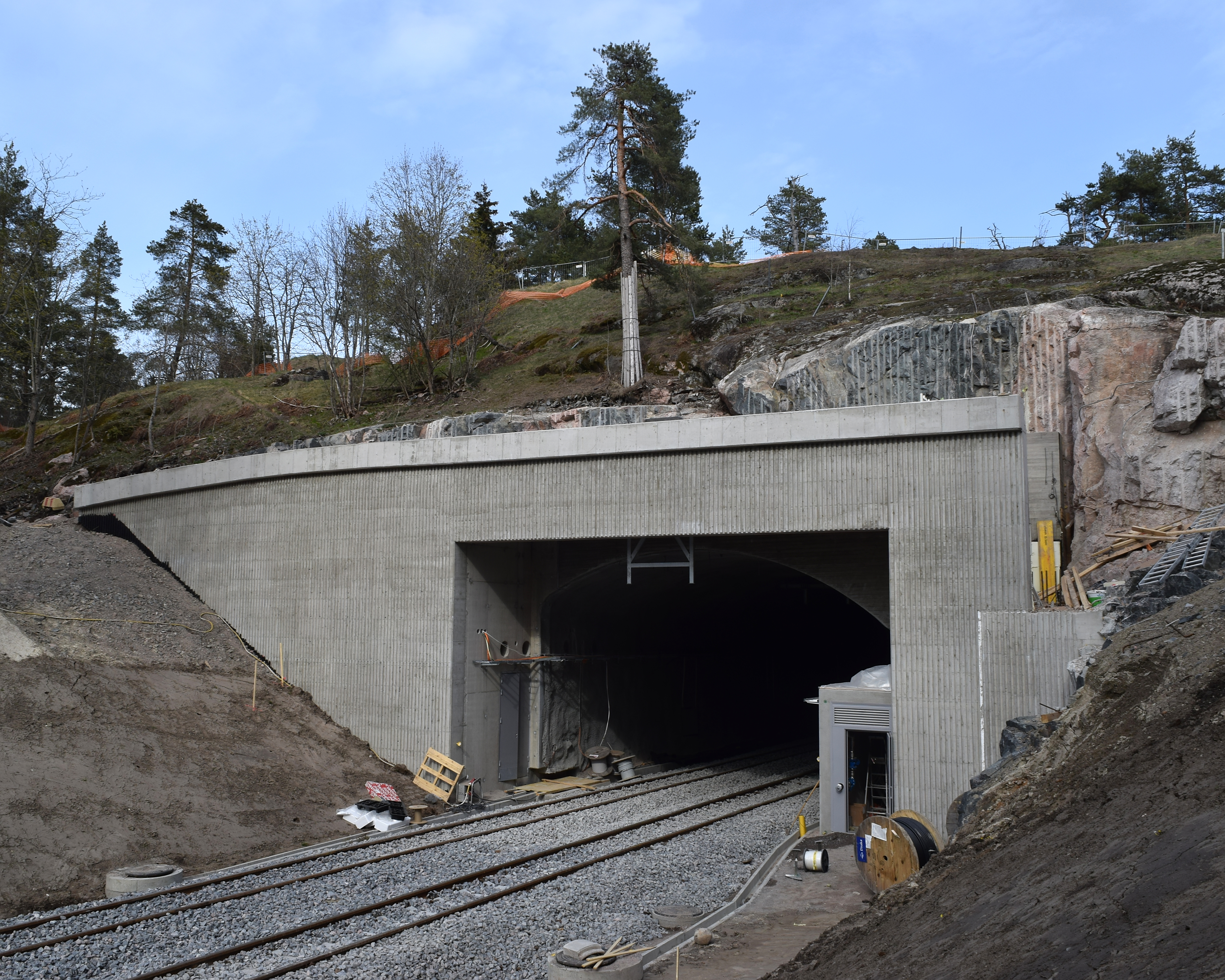
Western entrance of the Patterinmäki tunnel during construction work in May 2022

=== Opening ===
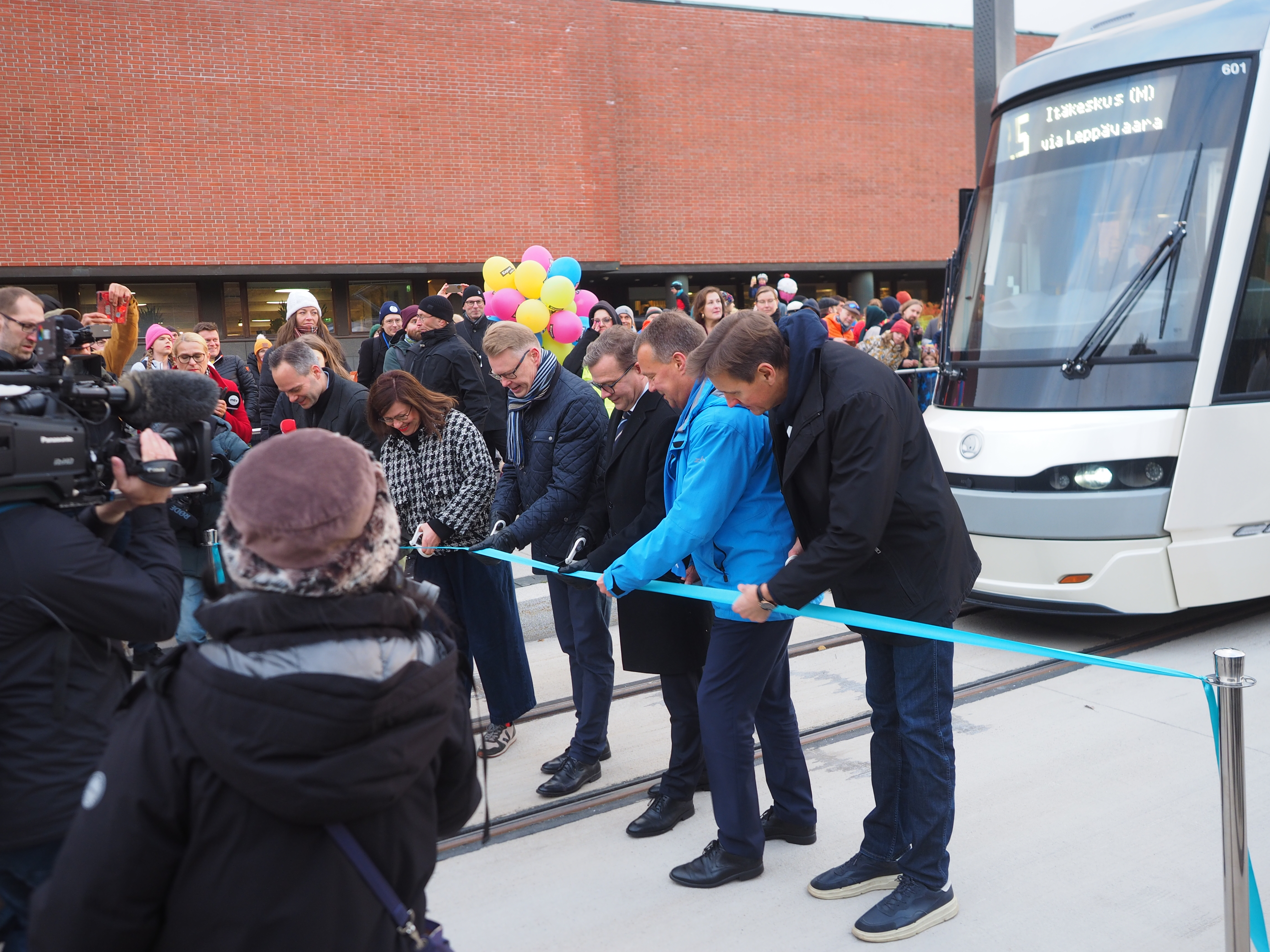
Ribbon cutting ceremony to officially inaugurate the light rail line. In the background is the first tram in service for the line awaiting departure.

The first service of Jokeri light rail took place in Otaniemi, where the first service departed on 21 October 2023 to Itäkeskus. HSL (Helsinki Regional Transport Authority) organized an opening event at Otaniemi, with guests like Finnish prime minister Petteri Orpo, Finnish minister of Environment and climate change Kai Mykkänen and the deputy mayor of Helsinki.

== Services ==
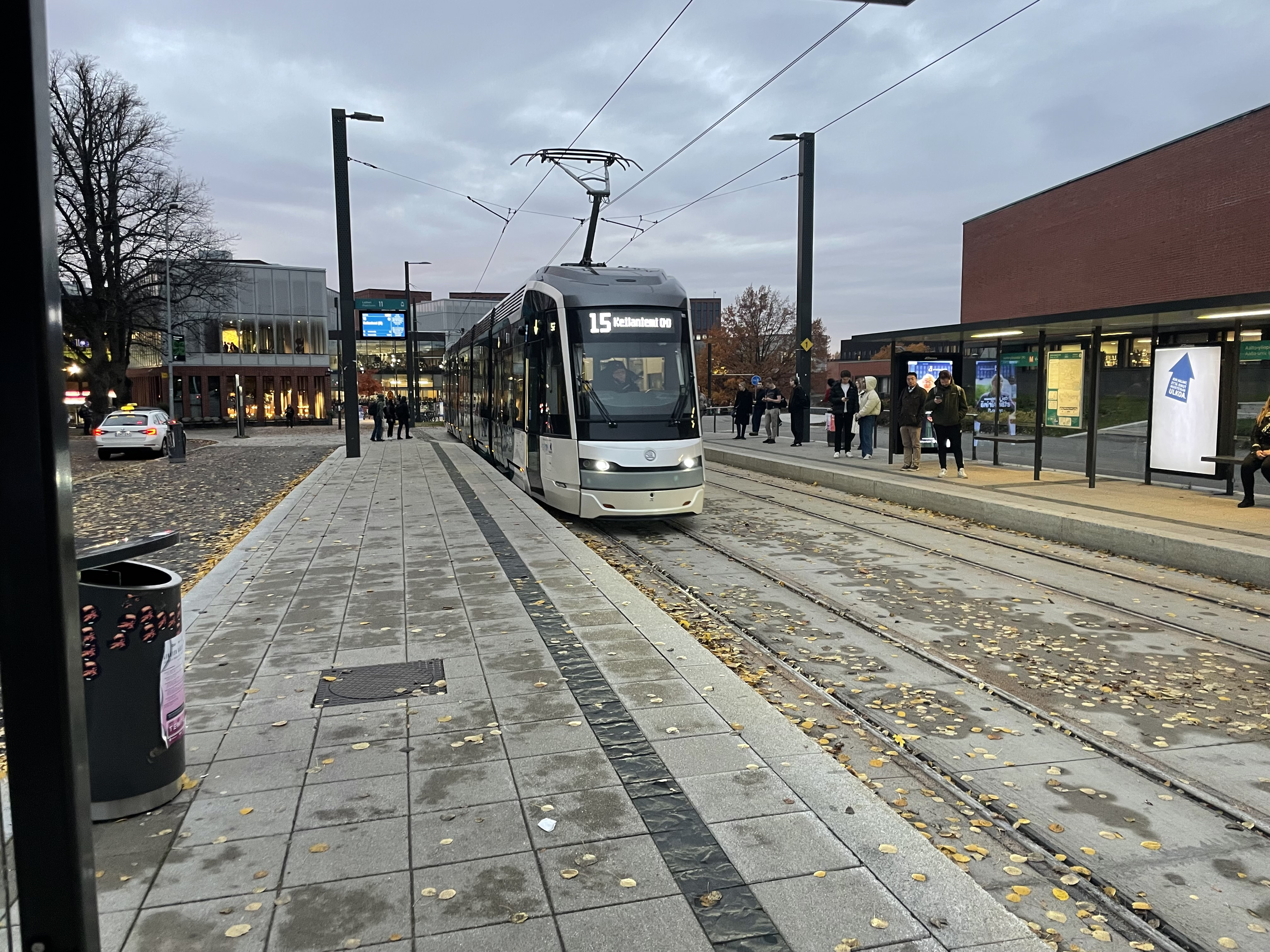
Tram 15 at the Aalto-yliopisto stop

Services on tram line 15 began on 21 October 2023. The initial service consisted of a tram every 12 minutes (5tph). On 1 December 2023, the frequency was increased to 6tph. From 4 March 2024, the peak time frequency was increased further, to a tram every 8 minutes (7.5tph). From summer 2024, the all-day frequency will be increased to 8tph, with up to 10tph at peak times.

The line is operated by Helsinki City Transport, although the operation is planned to be contracted out to a commercial entity later.

== Rolling stock ==
A total of 29 bi-directional Škoda Artic X54 units have been ordered for the line. The model, also known as Artic XL, is based on the Artic model originally designed for Helsinki's tram network and will also be used on the Crown Bridges lines. All trams are based at Roihupelto tram depot, which was built beside the Roihupelto metro depot used by Helsinki Metro.

== See also ==
- Trams in Finland
- Helsinki tram network
- Planned extension of the Helsinki tram network
- Stockholm Tvärbanan
