= Vantaa light rail =

Light rail line under construction in Finland

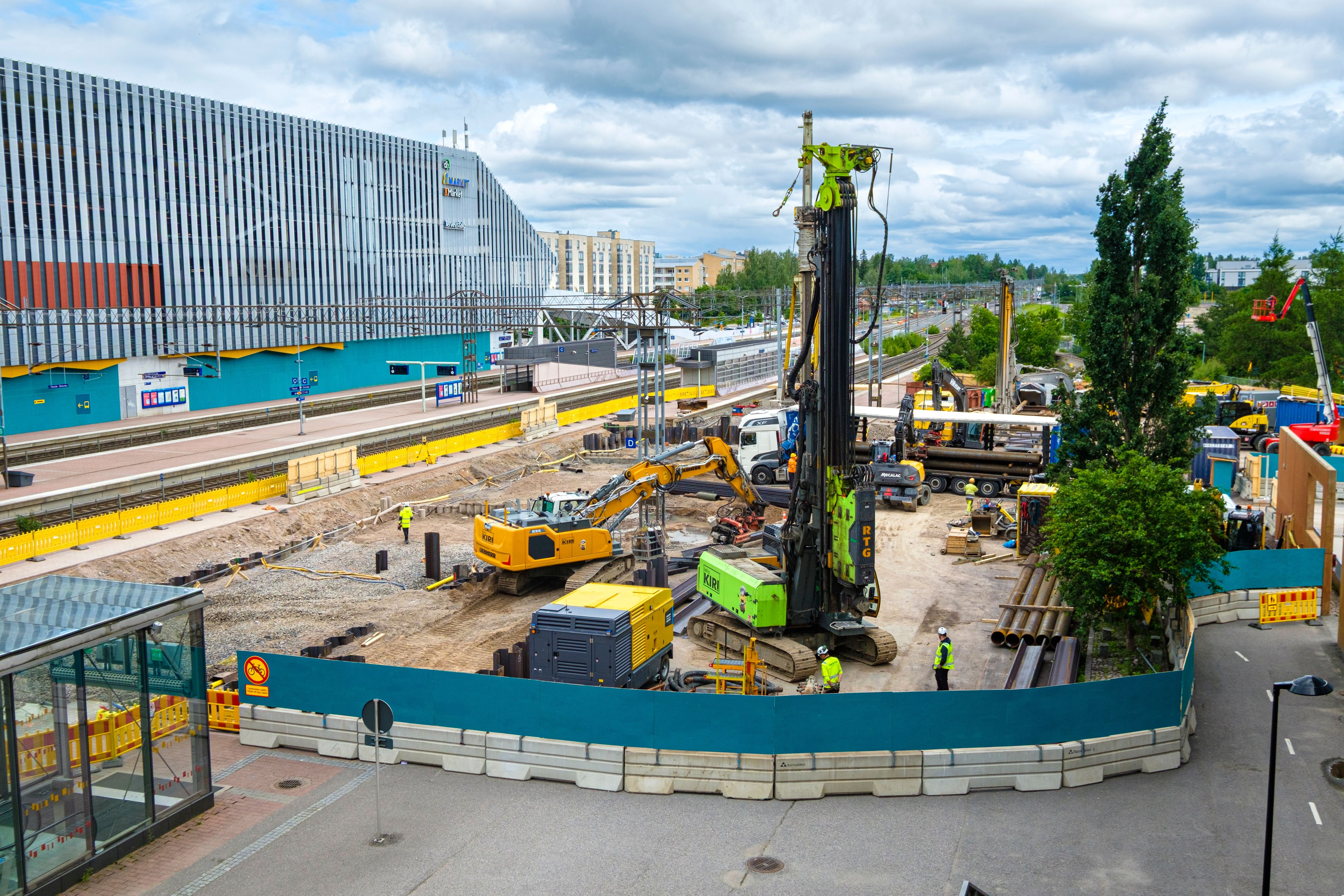
- Preparatory construction work for a tunnel at Tikkurila in June 2025

Overview
- Locale: Vantaa, Finland
- Termini: Mellunmäki; Helsinki airport
- Stations: 25
- Website: https://www.vantaa.fi/ratikka

Service
- Type: Light rail
- Daily ridership: 31,000 (est.)

History
- Planned opening: 2029

Technical
- Line length: 17.9 km (11.1 mi)
- Number of tracks: 2
- Track gauge: 1,000 mm (3 ft 3 3/8 in) metre gauge

Vantaa light rail is a light rail line under construction in Vantaa, Finland that will connect Mellunkylä, Hakunila, Tikkurila, Aviapolis and Helsinki Airport. The project was formally approved by Vantaa city council on May 22, 2023, and will replace the trunk bus line 570 upon completion. The construction began in June 2025, with a projected finishing date of 2029.

The average speed of the system is estimated to be 24 km/h (15 mph). At its fastest it may travel up to 70 km/h (43 mph). The trip from Hakunila to Tikkurila would be 10 minutes, and from Tikkurila to Jumbo 13 minutes. From Tikkurila to the airport it would take about half an hour. The planned capacity is 170 passengers per rail car.

The estimated cost of the project in 2025 was 750 million euros, of which the city of Vantaa would pay 541 million, the government of Finland 144 million, the Helsinki Region Environmental Services Authority 53 million, and the city of Helsinki 12 million as the line ends in Helsinki at Mellunmäki metro station.

In 2025, the route was cut 1.5 km (0.93 mi) short from the planned terminus at Helsinki Airport due to disagreements between the city and the airport operator Finavia.
