= Trams in Vyborg =

Tram networks in Viborg (1912-1957)

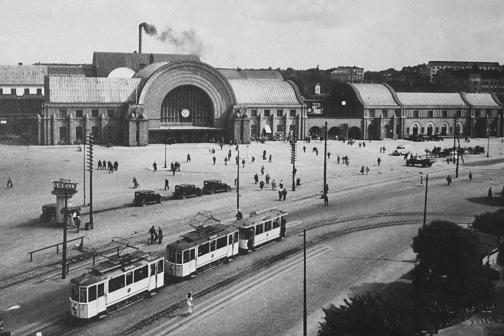
- Train station square in the 1930s

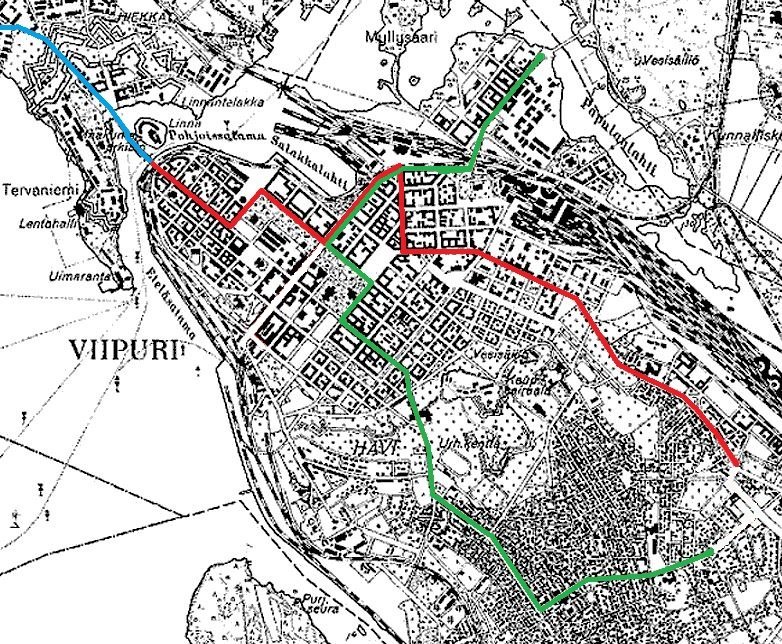
- Vyborg tram network in 1939

Overview
- Area served: Vyborg
- Locale: Leningrad Oblast, Russia
- Transit type: Tram
- Line number: 3

Operation
- Began operation: 1912
- Ended operation: 1957
- Character: At-grade street running
- Number of vehicles: 32 (1957)

Technical
- System length: Line length: 21.3 km (13.2 mi)
- No. of tracks: 1, in town centre 2
- Track gauge: 1,000 mm (3 ft 3 3/8 in)
- Electrification: 600 V DC overhead line

Vyborg, in Finland until 1940, and since then in Russia, had an electric tramway network from 1912 to 1957.

== History ==
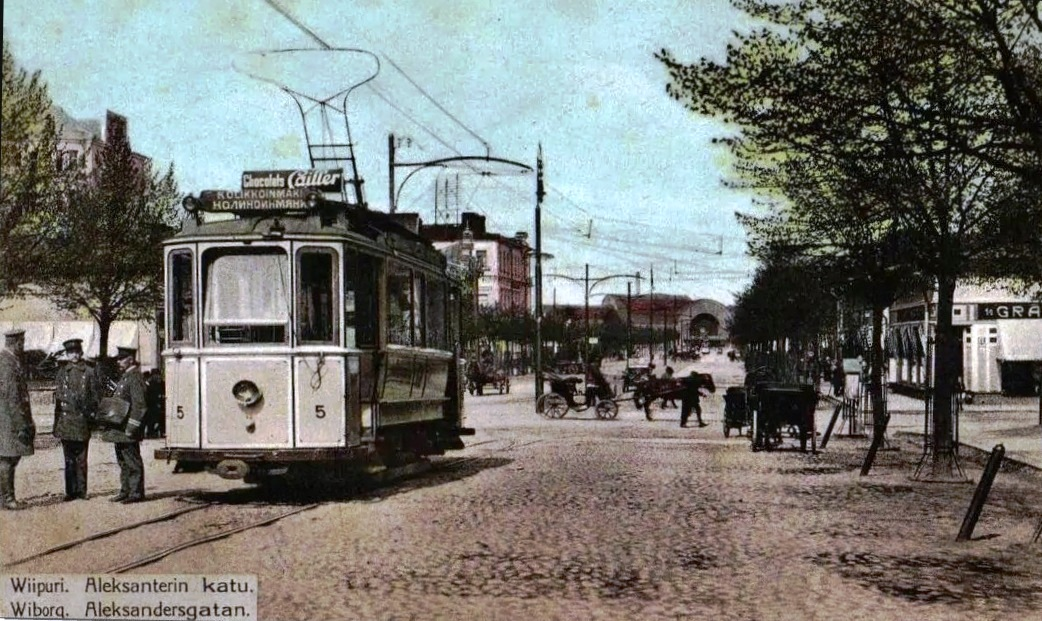
ASEA/AEG tram no. 5 in Viipuri, 1912.

The decision to start tram traffic in Vyborg was made in November 1910, when the city government signed an agreement with the German A.E.G. to build an electric power plant and tramways. The company was granted the exclusive right to build tramways and produce electricity in the city of Vyborg and areas that might be annexed to it later for the next 50 years, however, so that the city had the right to buy out the operation for itself after 24 years at the earliest. The tramway project was based on the positive experiences of Helsinki and Turku with their own tramways. At the time, Vyborg was the fourth largest city in the Grand Duchy of Finland, with approximately 27,500 inhabitants. In addition, the surrounding rural municipality of Vyborg had almost 40,000 inhabitants, so together they formed the second largest population center in the country.

Tram service began in Vyborg in September 1912. The service was operated by a subsidiary of A.E.G. called Elektricitätswerk und Straßenbahn Wiborg AG. Trial runs began on 22 September and regular service started on 28 September 1912. There were three lines, running from the city centre into suburbs.

When World War I broke out in 1914, German property was confiscated by order of Franz Albert Seyn, the Governor-General of Finland. The tram company was also confiscated. In the summer of 1917, the company was troubled by Russian soldiers who filled the trams and refused to pay for their journeys. Due to the events of 1918, there were disruptions in traffic in the early part of the year. After the Whites had taken over Vyborg in April 1918, almost the entire tram staff was replaced. The company's seizure ended in June 1918. Traffic returned to its full extent in July 1918.

The tramway was transferred at some point in the 1910s, at the latest in February 1920 to the Vyborg Gas and Electricity Joint Stock Company (from 1919 to Viipuri Gas and Electricity Oy). A.E.G. also owned the majority of this company. Unlike in Helsinki and Turku, the tramway continued to be owned by a private company even after the World War. However, there were ongoing disagreements between the company and the city about the management of the electricity system and the tramways, including ticket prices. In 1936, the company lost its operating license by an arbitration court decision and had to sell the electricity system and the tramways to the city of Vyborg. The purchase price was 22 million FIM.

The city of Vyborg began operating the tramway at the beginning of 1937. With the outbreak of the Winter War, tram traffic ceased on 23 December 1939, when the city's electricity supply was cut off. With the Moscow Peace Treaty that ended the war, Vyborg became part of the Soviet Union in 1940, where traffic was also a state responsibility. At the beginning of the Continuation War, Finland occupied the city in August 1941, but tram traffic was not able to be started until May 1943. It had to be stopped on 15 June 1944 due to the approaching Battle of Vyborg, in which the Soviet Union took back control of the city. Tram traffic started again in 1946, but was stopped in 1957 and the trams were moved to Kaliningrad and Pyatigorsk.

== See also ==
- History of rail transport in Finland
- History of rail transport in Russia
- List of town tramway systems in Europe
- Trams in Finland
- Rail transport in Finland
- Rail transport in Russia
